= Mutton curry =

Curry dish prepared from mutton or chevon

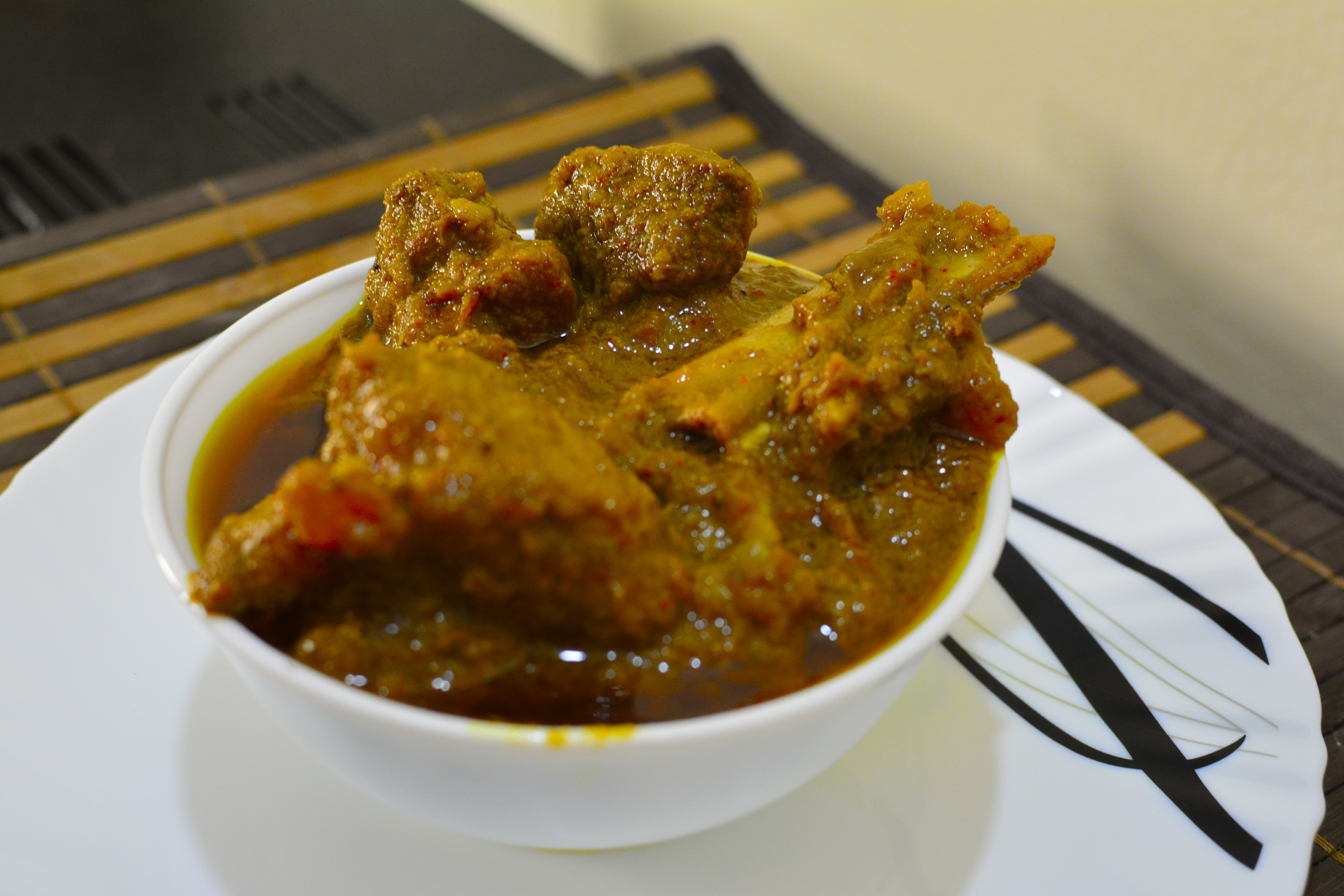
- Alternative names: Kosha Mangso
- Type: Curry
- Course: Main course
- Place of origin: India
- Region or state: Indian subcontinent
- Associated cuisine: India, Sri Lanka, Bangladesh, Pakistan, Nepal, Guyana, Suriname, Belize, Trinidad and Tobago, Jamaica, The Bahamas
- Serving temperature: Hot
- Main ingredients: Goat meat or mutton, tomato, onion, garlic, ginger, coriander leaves, Indian spices
- Similar dishes: Goat curry

Mutton curry (also referred to as kosha mangsho, lamb curry, or goat curry) is a dish that is prepared from goat meat (or sometimes lamb meat) and vegetables. The dish is found in different variations across all states, countries and regions of the Indian subcontinent and the Caribbean.

Mutton curry was originally prepared putting all the ingredients together in a earthen pot and slow cooking the whole curry by wood fire on a clay oven. Today it is cooked using pressure cookers and slow cookers after briefly sautéing all the ingredients and spices in a big wok. The steadily cooked mutton becomes more tender than normally cooked mutton. Mutton curry is generally served with rice or with Indian breads, such as naan or parotta. The dish can also be served with ragi, a cereal.

== Ingredients ==
Common ingredients used to prepare mutton curry include: mutton or goat meat, salt, turmeric powder, mustard oil, ginger garlic paste, dahi (yogurt), assortment of spices, onion, chilli, tomato, and coriander leaves.

== Variations ==
=== Bengal ===
Kosha mangsho is the Bengali version of mutton curry. It traditionally has less juice and more gravy than mutton curries eaten in other parts of India. This dish is prepared in a kosha style, which involves retaining the mutton's flavor and moisture using slow cooking and sautéeing methods.

The history of Bengalis eating mutton curry is very old. In Middle Bengali literature, i.e., in various Mangalkavyas such as Manasamangal, Chandimangal, and Dharmamangal Kāvyas, descriptions of cooking and eating goat meat in various ways can be found.

Kosha mangsho is traditionally prepared as part of the celebration of Kali Puja, a festival dedicated to the Hindu goddess Kali, celebrated on the New Moon day of the Hindu month Kartik.

Railway mutton curry is a British Raj colonial-era dish that was served on long-distance trains. The dish was served with dinner rolls. Tamarind was originally used to extend its shelf life. Some restaurants serve the dish in present-day times, such as Oh! Calcutta! restaurant in Kolkata, India. Railway mutton curry is prepared using a coconut milk base.

Mutton curry variations

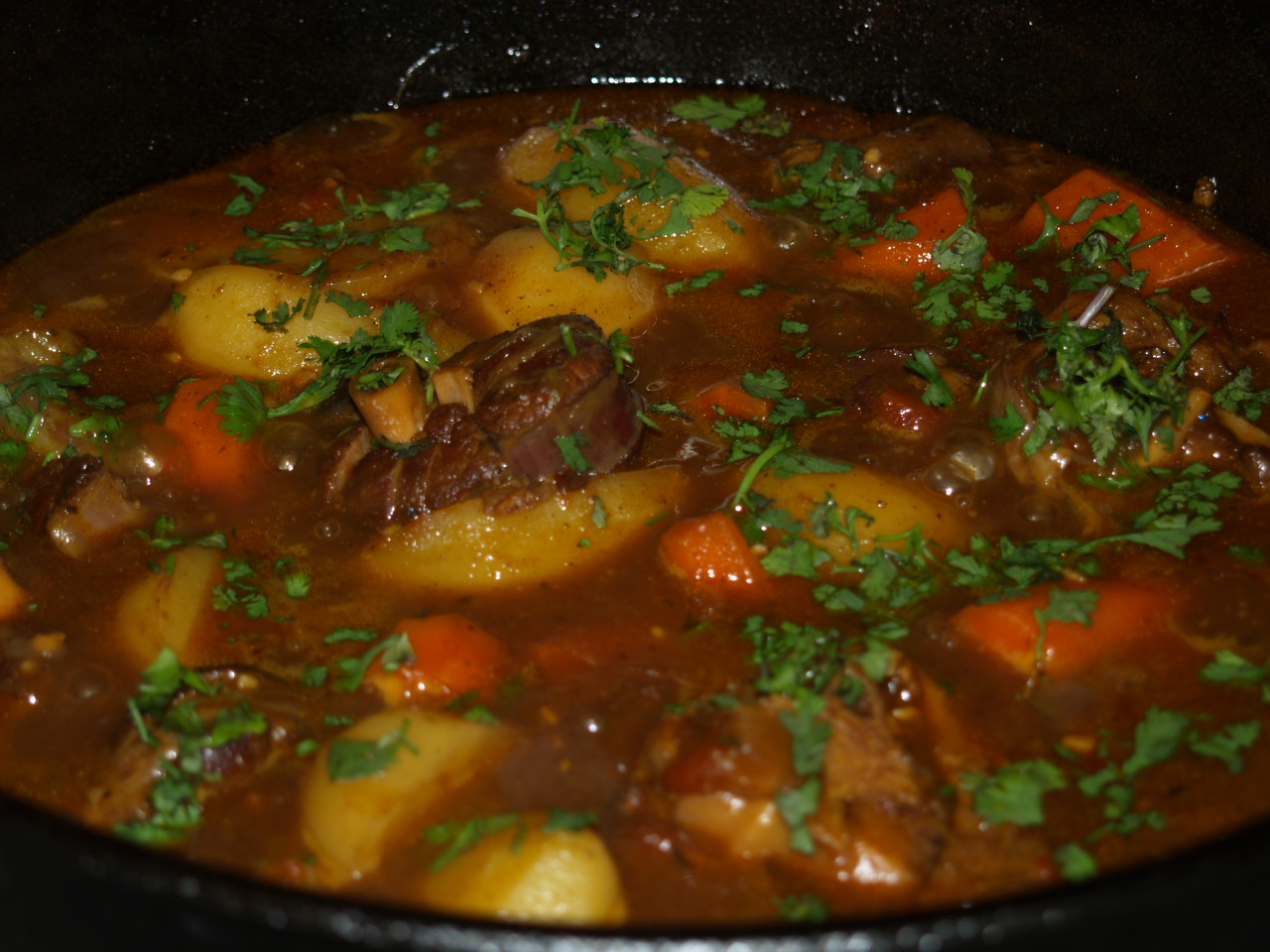
A pot of lamb curry

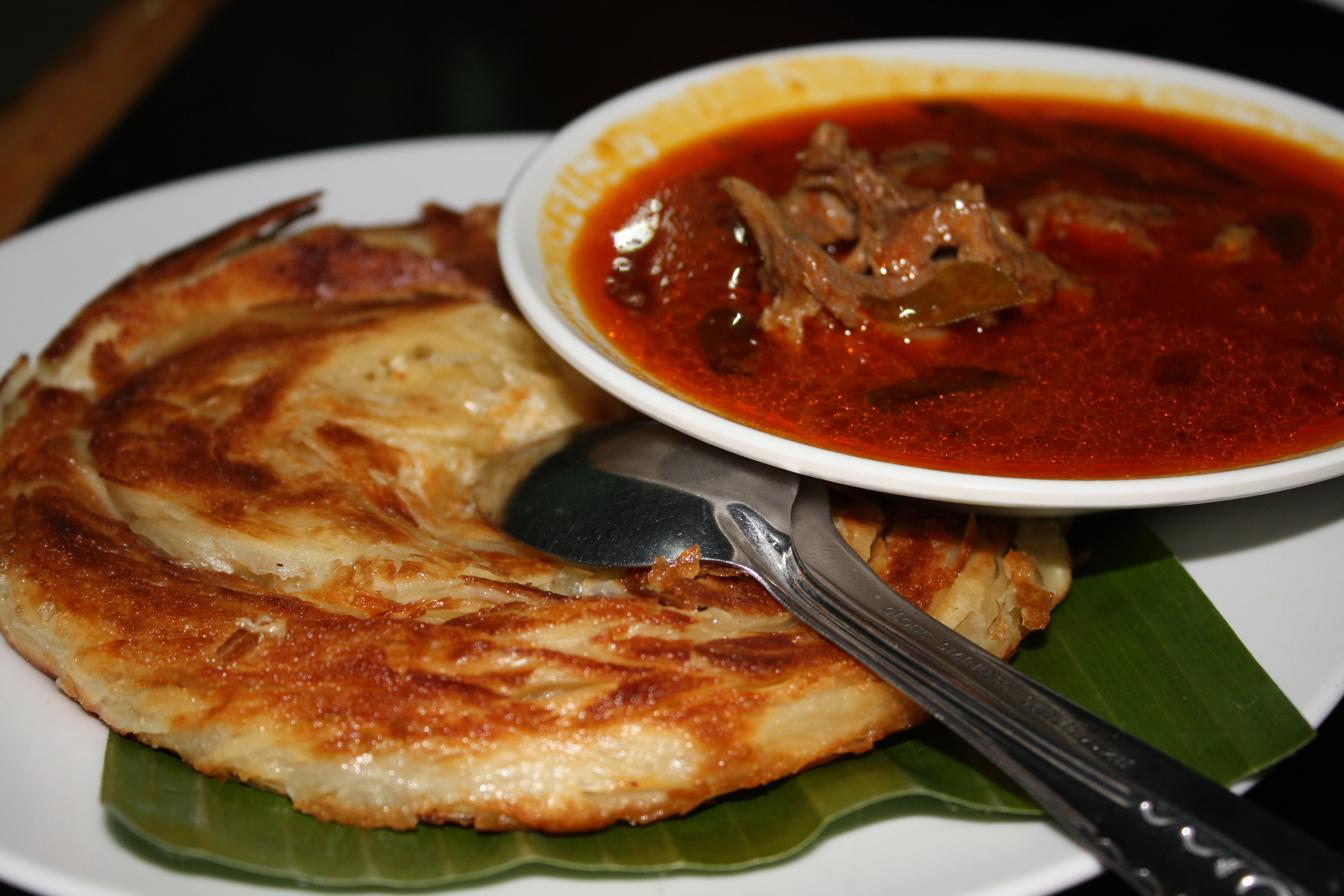
Roti cane with mutton curry (top)

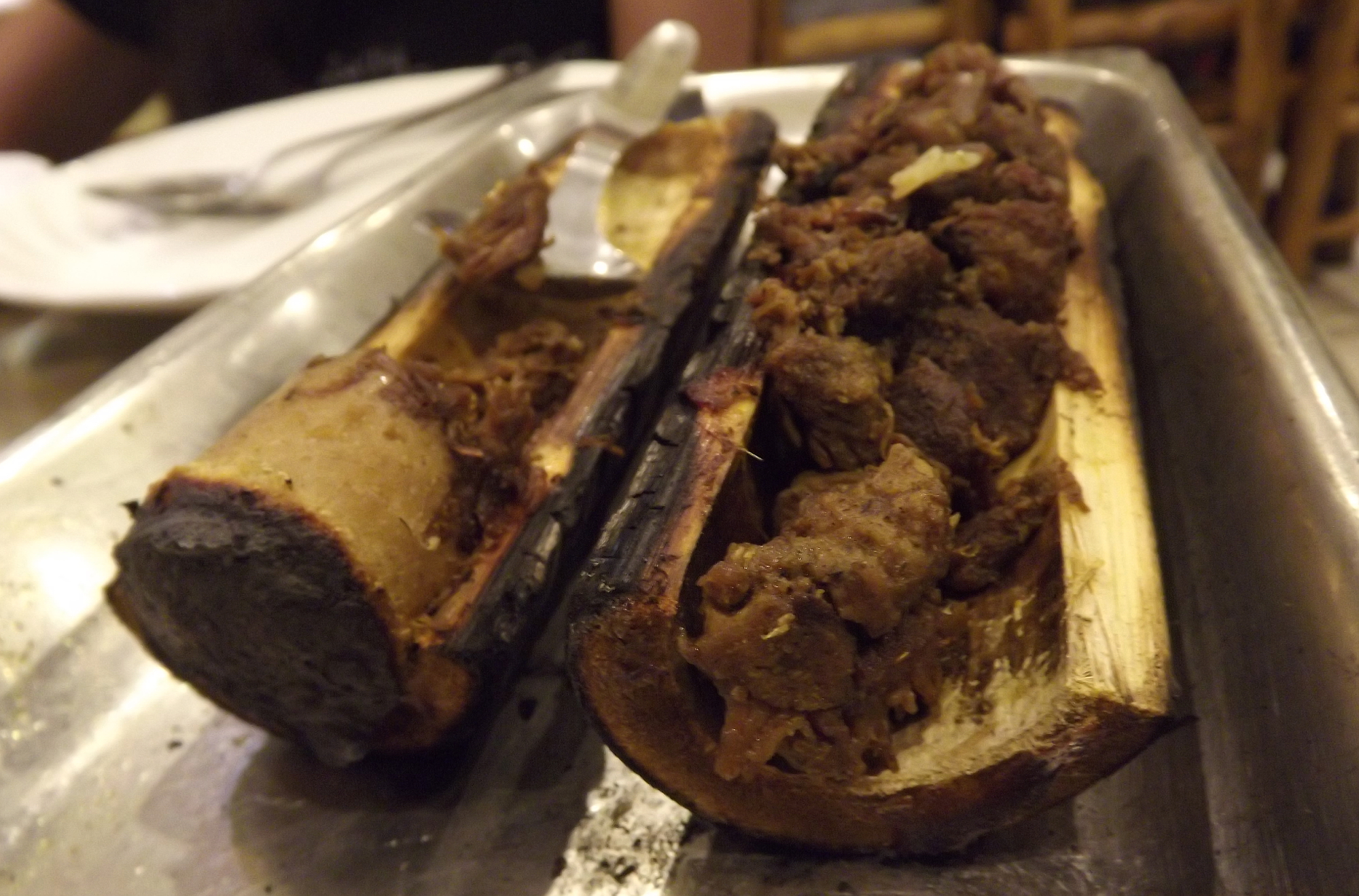
Bamboo mutton

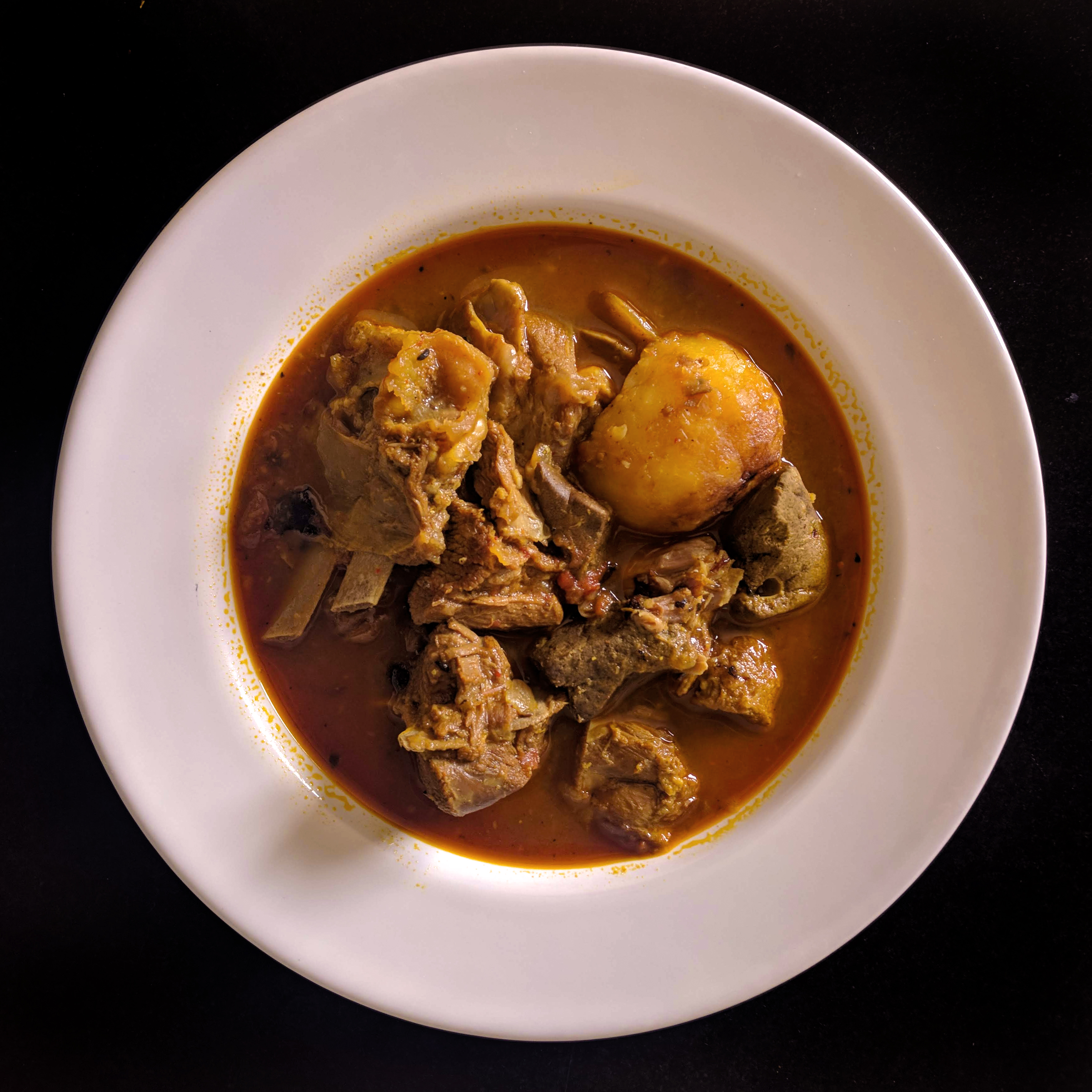
Bengali mutton curry

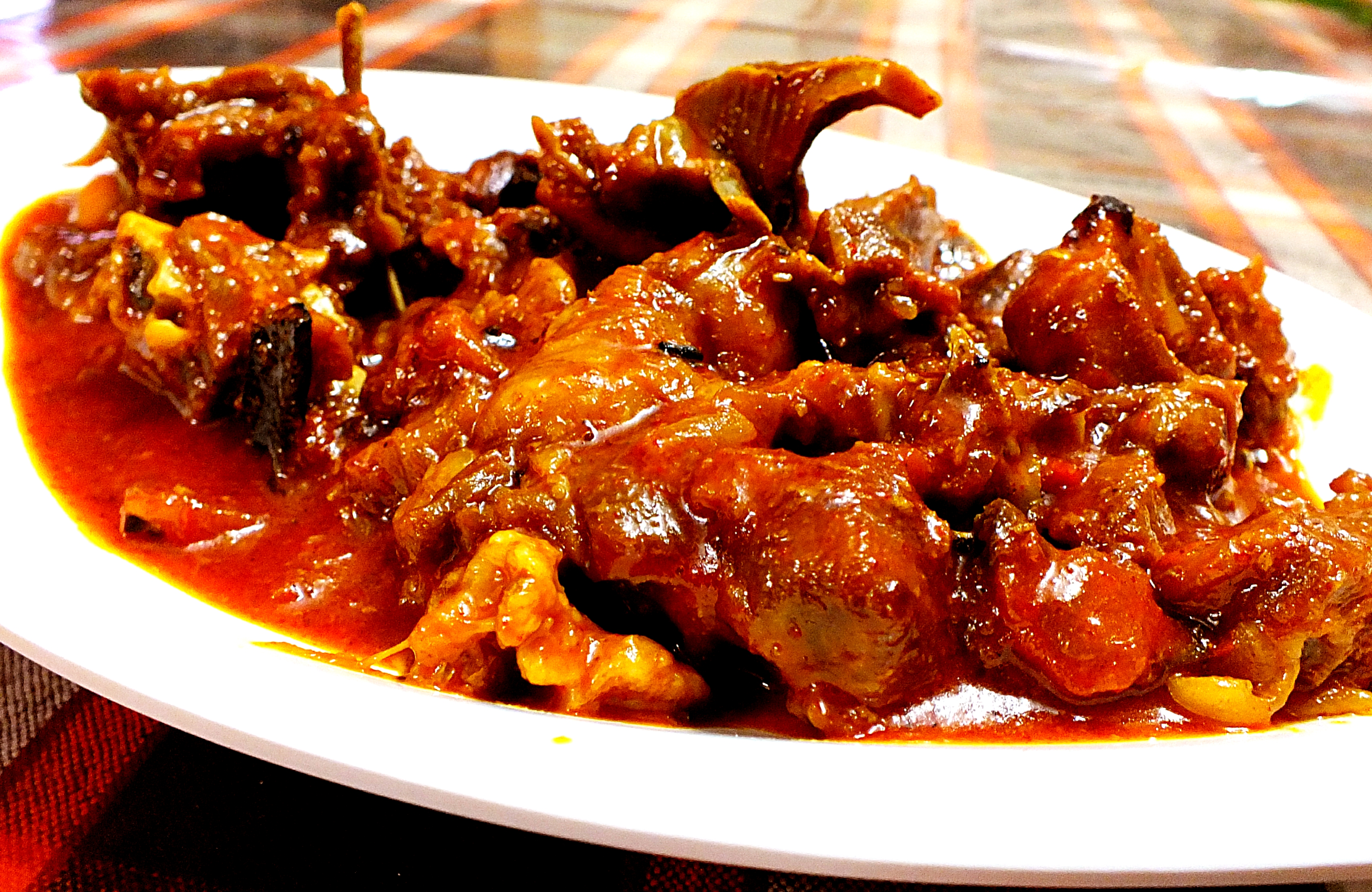
Bengali Mutton Kosha

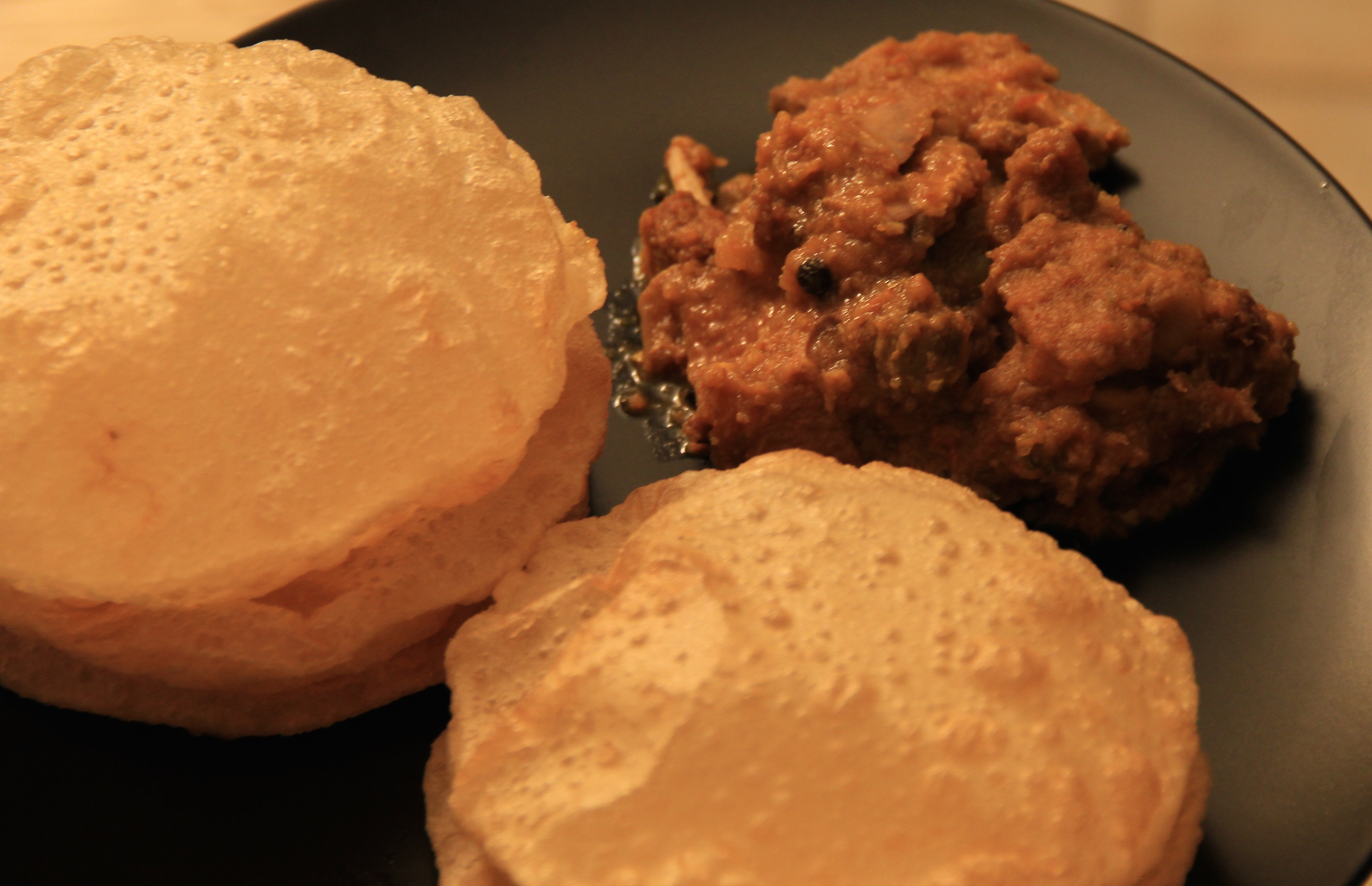
Luchi Maangsho

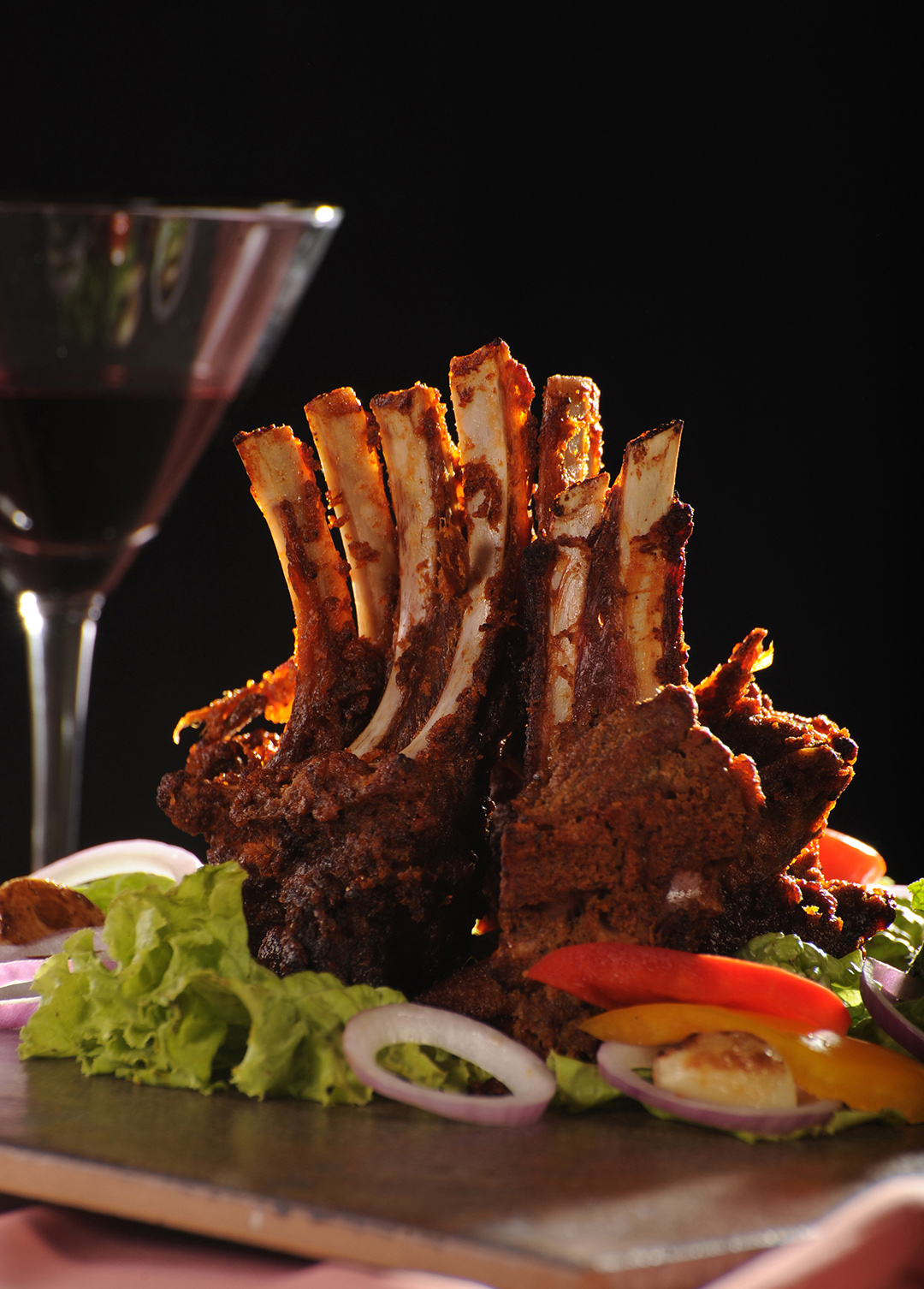
Mutton Chaap

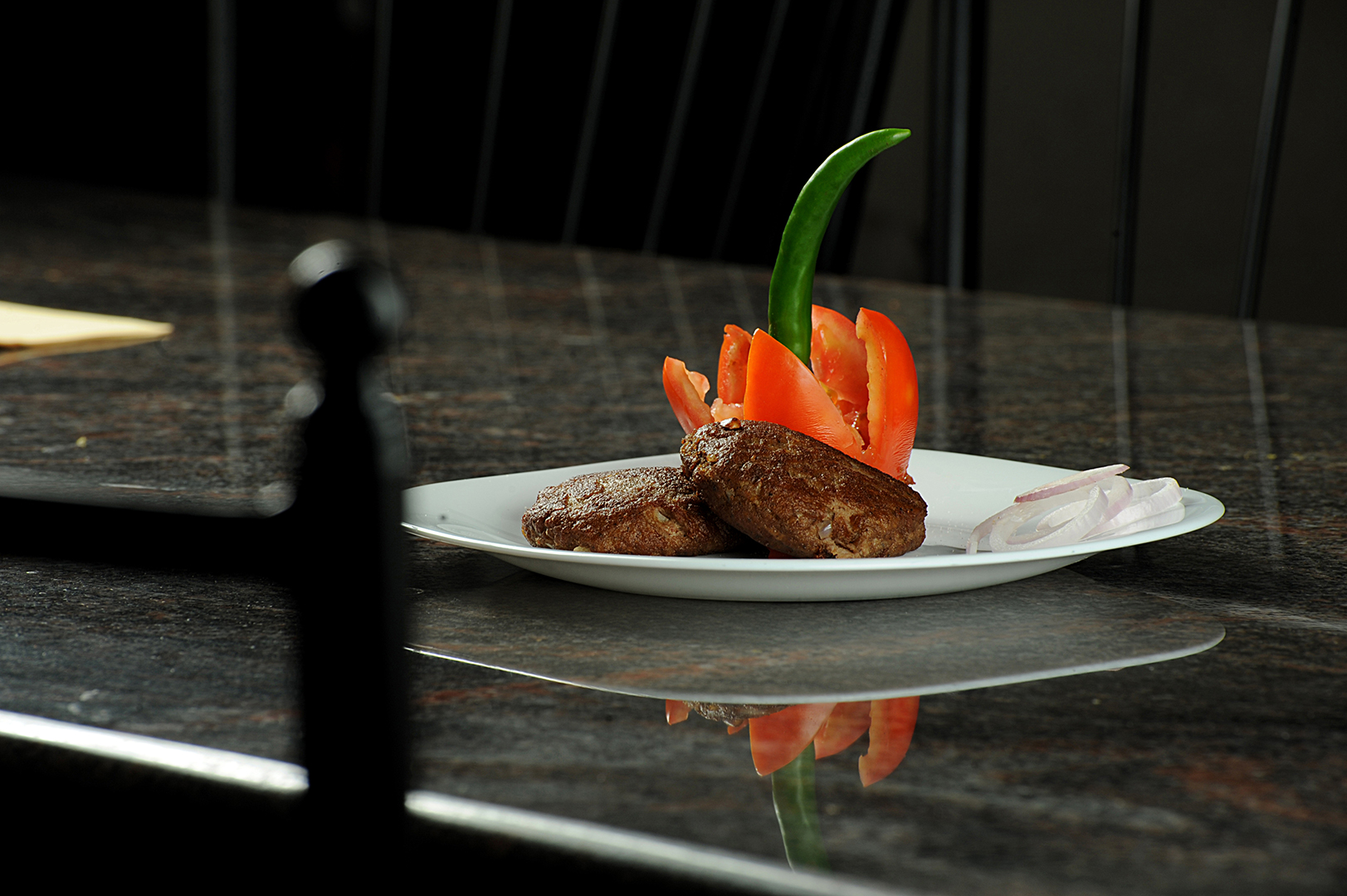
Mutton Keema Kabab

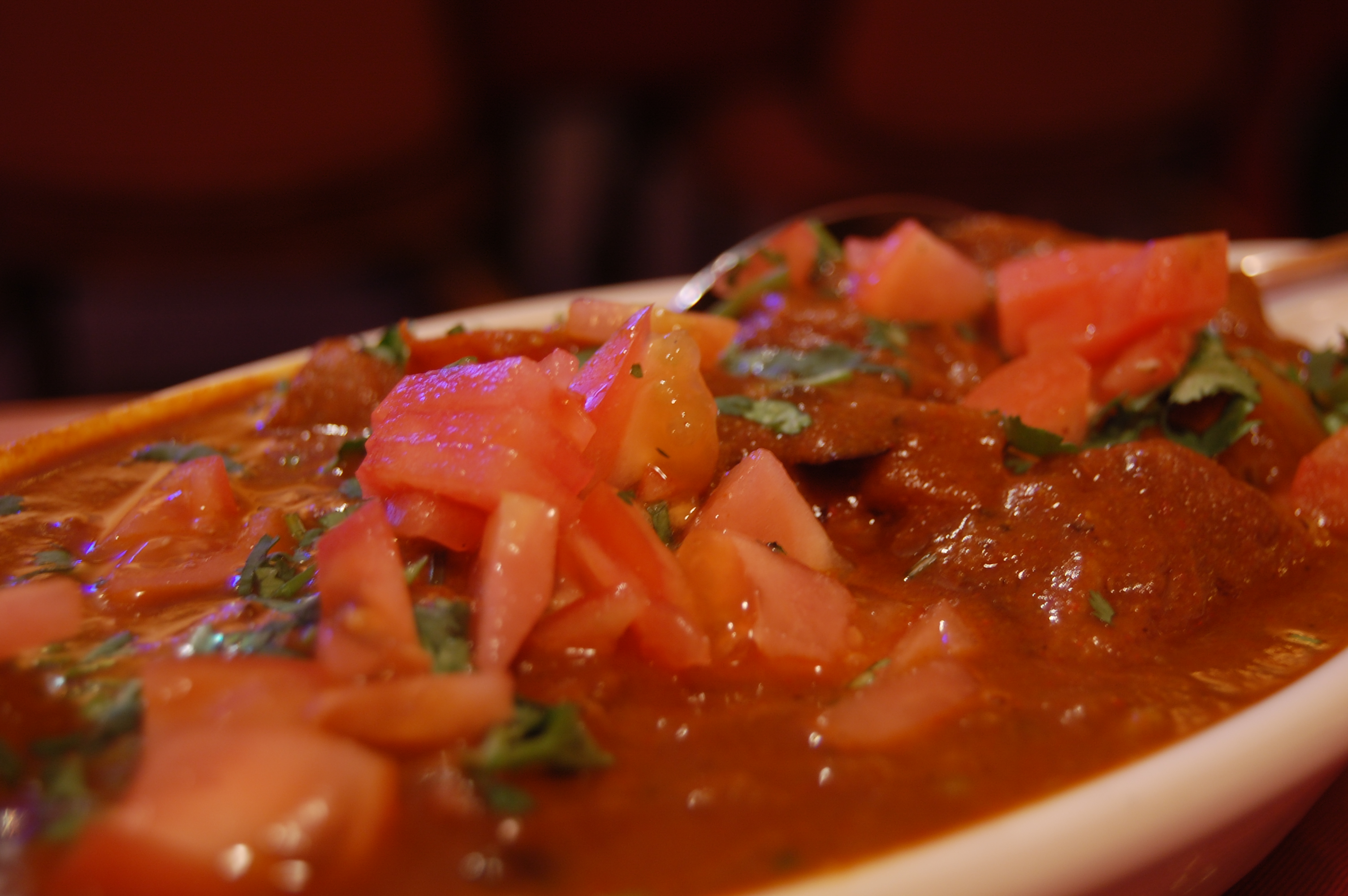
Rogan josh

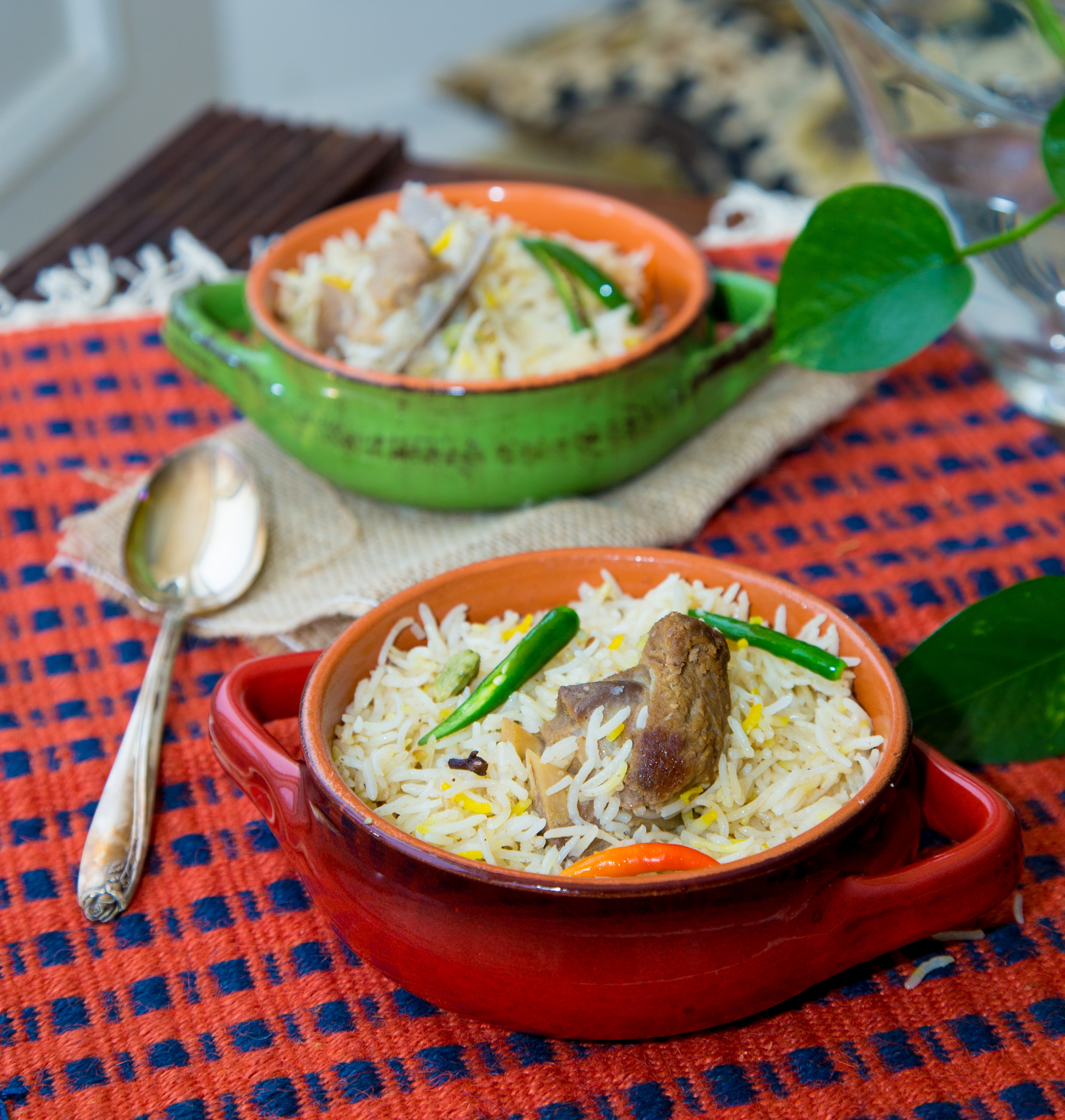
Mutton Pulao

=== Odisha ===
In Odisha, mutton curry is always made of khasi goat meat (meat of young castrated male goat). There are many varieties of goat meat curries prepared in Odisha. Simple and flavorful ingredients are used to prepare the curry and usually served with roti, naan or in Western Odisha, puffed rice (mudhi). Some of the popular curries are:

- Mutton Kassā (Odia: ମାଂସ କଷା, romanized: Māṅså Kåssā)
- Mutton Curry (Odia: ମାଂସ ତରକାରୀ, romanized: Māṅså Tårkāri)
- Mutton Roasted in Bamboo or Bamboo Mutton (Odia: ବାଉଁଶ ପୋଡ଼ା ମାଂସ, romanized: Bãuśå Poṛā Māṅså)
- Mutton Roasted in Leaf (Odia: ପତ୍ର ପୋଡ଼ା ମାଂସ, romanized: Påtrå Poṛā Māṅså)
- Mutton in Clay Pot (Odia: ମାଟି ହାଣ୍ଡି ମାଂସ, romanized: Māṭi Hāṇḍi Māṅså)
- Mutton Besar (Odia: ମାଂସ ବେସର, romanized: Māṅså Besår)

While mutton curry is usually eaten with rice, in Western Odisha, Mangsa Kassā is particularly relished with mudhi (puffed rice). Mangsa Kassā is claimed by some to be the predecessor of the popular Bengali goat curry dish known as Kosha Mangsho most probably introduced by the Odia cooks who moved to West Bengal during the British rule to work in the kitchens of Bengali families.

=== Maharashtra ===
Black Mutton curry (also referred to as konkani black mutton) is a dish that is prepared from goat or lamb meat, charred coconuts, and a signature spice blend. The regional dish originated in the Konkani district of Maharashtra, India.

Black Mutton curry was originally made by preparing a black spice paste consisting of charred coconuts, onions and peppers with spices which was then cooked low and slow in a cast iron wok. The cooked paste was added with the mutton along with fresh herbs and spices in an earthen pot and cooked low and slow till tender. The curry is typically served with breads such as Bhakari, Chapati, Pav or rice.

The dish utilizes a unique blend of spices called the Maharashtrian garam masala, which consists of cardamom, nutmeg, khus khus (poppy seeds), saunth (dried ginger), and many other Mughlai spices which lend the black mouton an intoxicating flavor and a robust color.

=== Bihar ===
Mutton is typically cooked in Bihar in curried form. In addition to fish and chicken, mutton is common in Bihari cuisine. Mutton curry is traditionally served with Malpua on Holi, while it is eaten with rice in a routine everyday meal. In Champaran, mutton is cooked in a sealed earthen pot as a one-pot curry.

=== Gujarat ===
Mutton curry has a special place in Surati cuisine. A rich mutton dish known as Tapelu which finds its origins in the kitchens of the Surati Khatri community, is often cooked in large batches, especially during festivities. Goat offal also finds a place in the cuisine of Surat.

=== Counterfeit variations ===
In 2012, in the Midlands, England, trading standards officers working undercover went to twenty restaurants that were randomly chosen and bought 39 lamb curry and kebab dishes. Four of the dishes contained no lamb, instead using a mixture that contained beef, pork or chicken. In the investigation, it was found that only three lamb curries out of the nineteen tested contained only lamb. Most were found to consist of a mixture of lamb with beef or chicken. Additionally, all of the twenty lamb kebabs that were sampled contained meats in addition to lamb that was mixed with it, such as beef, pork or chicken.

== See also ==
- List of Indian dishes
- Cuisine of Odisha
