= Caldo =

Caldo may refer to:

== Food ==
- Broth, whose Spanish name is caldo
- Caldo de costilla ("rib broth"), served as breakfast in Colombia
- Caldo de pollo, Latin American chicken soup
- Caldo de queso, also known as Sonoran cheese soup, served in central Mexico and southwest United States
- Caldo de siete mares ("seven seas soup"), also known as caldo de mariscos ("seafood soup"), commonly served in Mexico
- Caldo verde, soup popularly served in Brazil and northern Portugal
- Caldo galego, traditional soup dish from Galicia
- Pira caldo, Paraguayan fish stew
- Congee, rice porridge also known as arroz caldo (Spanish: caldo de arroz, "rice soup") in the Philippines
- Guarapa, also known as caldo de cana ("cane juice") in Brazil

== Other ==
- Caldo Verde Records, American record company
- Hot Autumn (autunno caldo), series of labor actions in Italy 1969–1970
- Paolo il caldo, 1955 novel by Vitaliano Brancati
- Caldo Largo, novel by Earl Thompson
