= Belizean cuisine =

Culinary traditions of Belize

Belizean cuisine is an amalgamation of all ethnicities in the nation of Belize and their respectively wide variety of foods. Breakfast often consists of sides of bread, flour tortillas, or fry jacks that are often homemade and eaten with various cheeses. All are often accompanied with refried beans, cheeses, and various forms of eggs. Inclusive is also cereal along with milk, coffee, or tea.

Midday meals vary, from lighter foods such as rice and beans, tamales, panades (fried meat pies), escabeche (onion soup), chimole/chirmole (soup), stew chicken, garnaches (fried tortillas with beans, cheese, and diced onion sauce or diced cabbage) to various constituted dinners featuring some type of rice and beans, meat and salad or coleslaw.

In the rural areas meals may be more simplified than in the cities. The Maya use recado, corn or maize for most of their meals, and the Garifuna are fond of seafood, cassava (particularly made into cassava bread or ereba) and vegetables. Local fruits are quite common, raw vegetables from the markets less so. Mealtime is a communion for families and schools and some businesses close at midday for lunch, reopening later in the afternoon.

== Mestizo and Maya ==
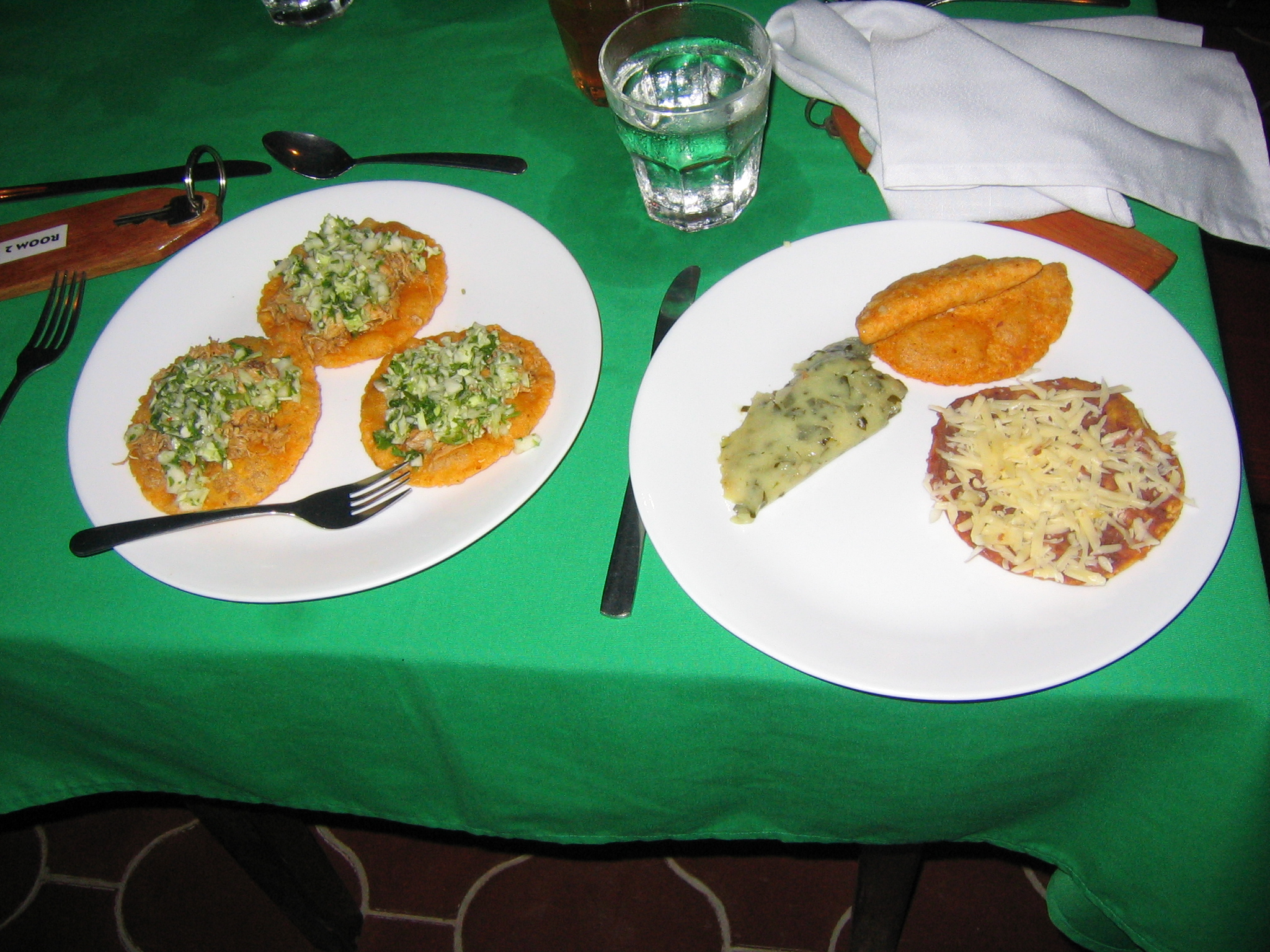
Traditional Mestizo-Belizean foods

Regular deli items originally from the Mestizo culture that are now considered pan-Belizean include garnaches, fried corn tortillas smeared with beans and shredded cheese, tamales made from corn and chicken, and panades, fried corn patties with beans or seasoned shredded fish inside and topped with pickled onions.

The most famous Maya dish is called caldo. Tortillas, cooked on a comal and used to wrap other foods (meat, beans, and others), were common and are perhaps the most well-known pre-Columbian Mesoamerican food. Tamales consist of corn dough, often containing a filling, that are wrapped in a corn husk and steam-cooked. Both atole and pozole were liquid-based gruel-like dishes that were made by mixing ground maize (hominy) with water, the first much more dense and used as a drinking source and the second with complete big grains of maize incorporated into a chicken broth. Though these dishes could be consumed plain, other ingredients were added to diversify flavor, including, for example, honey, chiles, meat, seafood, cacao, wild onions, and salt.

Several different varieties of beans were grown, including pinto, red, and black beans. Other cultivated crops, including fruits, contributed to the overall diet of the ancient Maya, including tomato, chile peppers, avocado, breadnut, guava, guanabana, papaya, pineapple, pumpkin, and sweet potato. Various herbs were grown and used, including vanilla, epazote, achiote (and the annatto seed), white cinnamon, hoja santa, avocado leaf, and garlic vine.

== Kriols ==
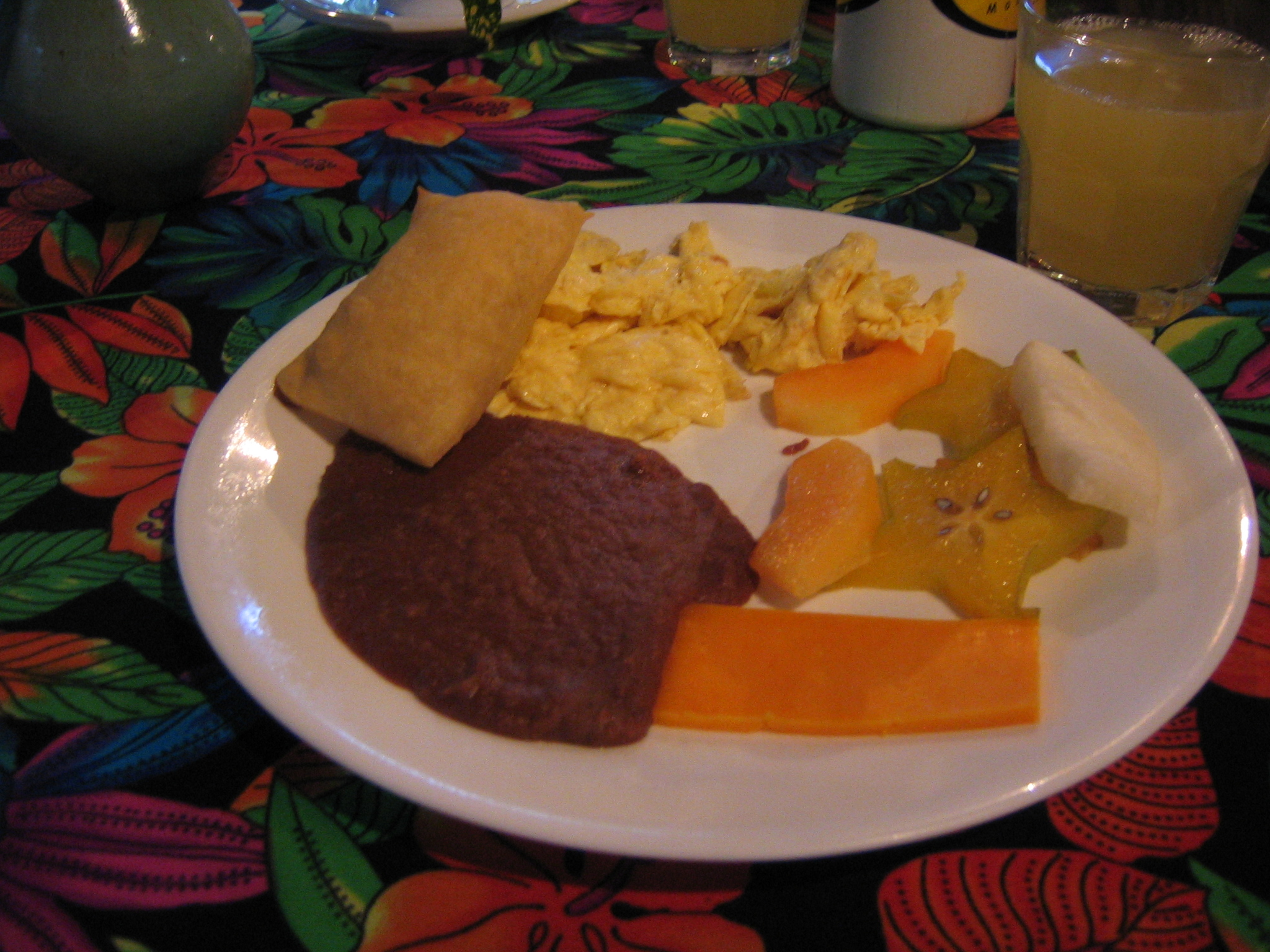
Traditional Belizean breakfast

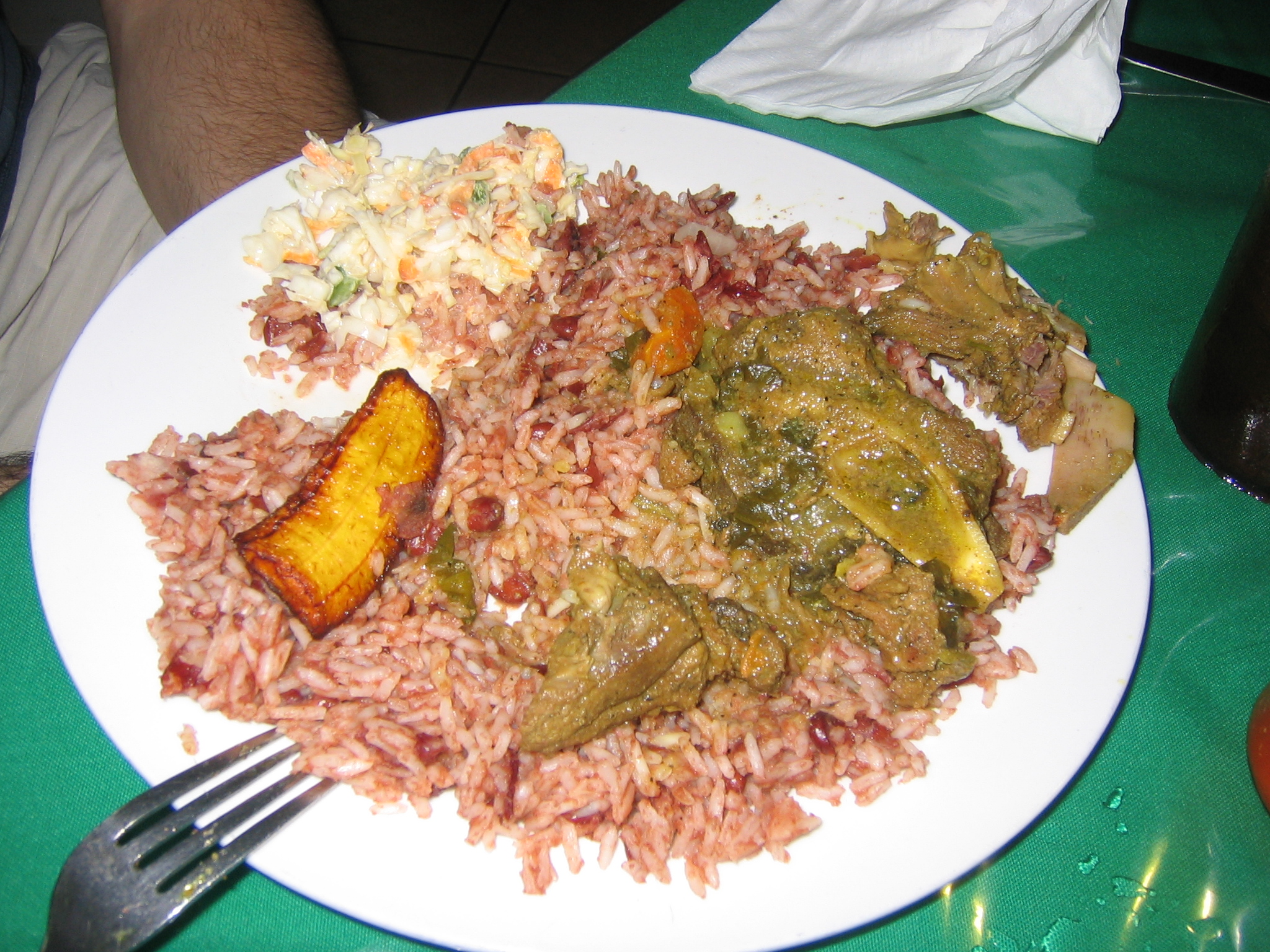
Traditional Belizean dinner

Kriols in general eat a relatively balanced diet. The bile up (or boil up) is considered the cultural dish of the Belizean Kriols. It is a combination of boiled eggs, fish or pig tail, with a number of ground foods such as cassava, green plantains, yams, sweet potatoes, cocoa, and tomato sauce. In Belize, cassava is traditionally made into "bammy", a small fried cassava cake inherited from the Garifuna.

The cassava root is grated, rinsed well, dried, salted, and pressed to form flat cakes about 4 inches in diameter and half an inch thick. The cakes are lightly fried, then dipped in coconut milk and fried again. Bammies are usually served as a starchy side dish with breakfast, with fish dishes or alone as a snack. Cassava pone is a traditional Belizean Kriol and pan-West Indian dessert recipe for a classic cassava flour cake sometimes made with coconuts and raisins.

The Kriol fish seré is similar to a dish from the Garifuna culture, called hudut. There are two main types of hudut – one made with coconut milk, similar to the seré described above, but made with mashed half-ripe plantain. The other type does not use coconut milk and may best be compared to a spicy fish soup. Bos a pepa, a Belizean pepper sauce made from the hot habanero or the milder jalapeño, is sometimes added.

Every part of the coconut has some use: the dried husk for ornamental arts and for getting the fire going in a barbecue; the water as a refreshing beverage or as a mixer with alcoholic drinks; the meat grated for its milk for uses as described above, or in other preparations, like the distinctive coconut-flavored taste of Kriol bread and bun. Dukunu is a dish made with sweetened starch—usually cornmeal but sometimes sweet corn—wrapped and boiled in aluminum foil or a banana leaf. Cahn sham is ground or powdered sweetened parched corn. The dried grated coconut meat, after being mixed with water and the milk squeezed, provides the basis for many Belizean desserts.

Like coconut pie and tarts, coconut crust (the grated coconut is sweetened with sugar and baked in a flour crust folded over like a patty), tablata, which is the grated coconut meat mixed with thin ginger slices, sugar and water, baked and cut into squares; there is also the version called cut-o-brute, which is made of chunks of coconut instead of the grated pieces; and then there is trifle, made with half green grated coconut, milk, flour, sugar, eggs, lemon essence, margarine and baking powder (similar to coconut cake); coconut fudge; and coconut ice cream.

As noted above, fry jacks or Johnny cakes accompanied by fried beans with sausage or eggs make a common Belizean breakfast. Both the jacks and Johnny cakes are made from flour, but while the jacks are flattened and fried, the Johnny cakes are round fluffy savory biscuits, often topped by butter or a slice of cheese.

Among the main staples of a Kriol dinner are rice and beans with some type of meat and salad, whether potato, vegetable, or coleslaw; seafoods including fish, conch, and lobster; some game meats including iguana, deer, peccary and gibnut; and ground foods such as cassava, potatoes, cocoa and plantains. Fresh juice or water are typically served, occasionally replaced by soft drinks and alcoholic beverages (homemade wines made from berries, cashew, sorosi, grapefruit and rice are especially common).

Typical desserts include sweets such as wangla and powderbun, cakes and pies, and potato pudding (pound).

== Garifuna ==
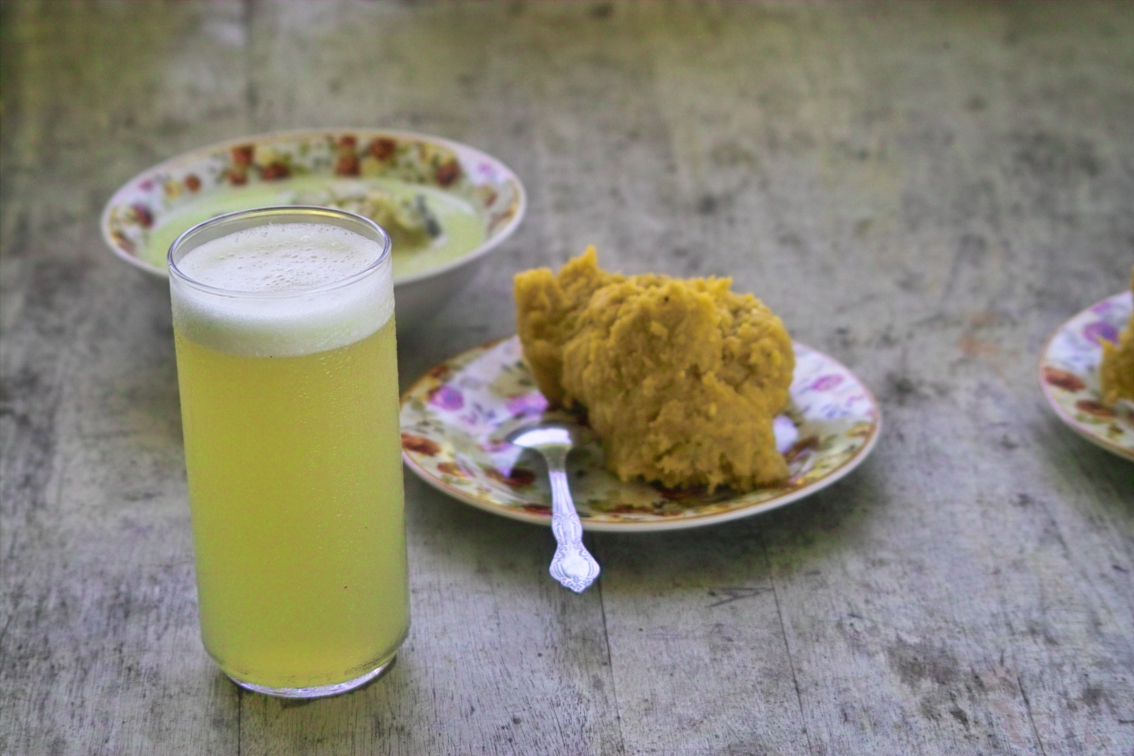
Traditional Garifuna dinner

There is a wide variety of Garifuna dishes, including the more commonly known ereba (cassava bread) made from grated cassava or manioc. This is done in an ancient and time-consuming process involving a long, snake-like woven basket (ruguma) which strains the cassava of its juice. It is then dried overnight and later sieved through flat rounded baskets (hibise) to form flour that is baked into pancakes on a large iron griddle. Ereba is eaten with fish, hudutu (pounded plantains) or alone with gravy (lasusu). Others include bundiga (a plantain lasusu), mazapan, and bimacacule (sticky sweet rice).

== Common ingredients ==
There is a difference in the flavors of meats, such as turkey and chicken, from other countries because of differences in the diet of the animals being fed on local foodstuffs as opposed to imported grains. Belizean chickens in particular some allege compared to other chickens have an unusually rich flavor. Belizeans eat much more chicken and fish than beef or pork.

- Cassava
- Cohune
- Plantain
- Banana
- Habanero
- Chayote (locally known as "chocho")
- Allspice
- Ginger
- Callaloo
- Escallion
- Mangoes
- Breadfruit
- Yam
- Garlic
- Black pepper
- Dried and salted cod (locally known as "salt fish")
- Salted beef
- Thyme
- Cow feet
- Pork tail
- Coconut milk
- Coconut
- Guava
- Soursop
- Passion fruit
- Sugar cane
- Ketchup
- Onion
- Brown sauce
- Mamey sapote (locally known as "mahmee")
- Calabash
- Avocado (locally known as "pear")
- Black bean
- Kidney bean
- Roselle (locally known as "sorrel")
- Tamarind (locally known as "tambran")
- Starfruit
- Golden apple
- Craboo
- Jackfruit
- Pineapple
- Malay apple
- Vinegar
- Recado
- Masa
- Maize
- Curry

== Popular dishes ==
- Ceviche
- Fry jack
- Johnnycake
- Conch fritter
- Dukunu
- Hudut
- Bile up
- Tamales
- Curry chicken
- Rice and beans - rice stewed with beans and coconut milk
- Garnaches
- Panades
- Salbutes
- Burritos
- Brown stew chicken
- Brown stew beef
- Caldo
- Escoveitch fish
- Conch soup
- Callaloo and saltfish
- Cabbage and saltfish
- Steamed fish
- Cow foot
- Caan sham (also casham or kasham)
- Stretch me guts - taffy made with coconut water
- Tacos
- Meat pies
- Jerk chicken
- Kebab
- Coconut rice
- Pupusas
- Dhal roti
- Goat curry
- Belizean patties
- Creole bread
