= Goat roti =

Traditional Caribbean food

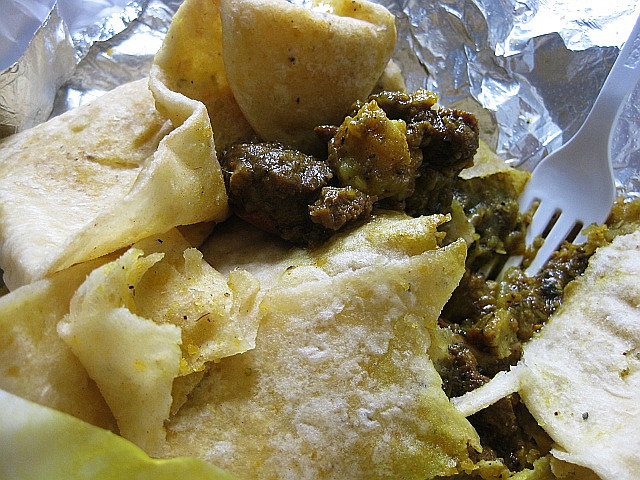
- A curried goat and potato roti
- Type: Roti (wrap)
- Course: Main course
- Place of origin: Trinidad and Tobago
- Region or state: Caribbean
- Created by: Indo-Trinidadians and Tobagonians
- Main ingredients: Curried goat, curried potatoes, paratha or dhalpuri

Goat roti (Note: /ˈroʊti/ ROH-tee) is a wrap roti (a wrap-style sandwich) filled with curry goat and other ingredients. It originates in the Trinidad and Tobago cuisine and is also popular in other Caribbean countries such as Guyana, Suriname, and Jamaica.

== Preparation ==
The roti, an Indian-style round flatbread, is filled with curry goat and additional ingredients. The roti used could be paratha or dhalpuri. Potatoes and/or chickpeas are usually among those, often curried as well.

== See also ==
- Goat curry
- Roti (wrap)
- Curry puff
- List of goat dishes
