= Mathura, Bihar =

Mathura
- Village
- Location within Bihar
- Coordinates: 27.108°N 84.464°E
- Country: India
- State: Bihar
- District: West Champaran district
- Founder: Bodha shah

Government
  - Body: Gram Panchayat

Area
  - Total: 5 km^{2} (1.9 sq mi)
- Elevation: 82 m (269 ft)

Population
  - Total: 6,000
  - Density: 1,200/km^{2} (3,100/sq mi)

Languages
  - Official: Hindi Bhojpuri
- Time zone: UTC+5:30 (IST)
- Postal code: 845451
- ISO 3166 code: IN-BR
- Vehicle registration: BR22

Mathura is a village in West Champaran district in the Indian state of Bihar. This village is located on Narkatiaganj -Raxaul main road and railway line. Mathura-Pirari also starts from here. It is recognized for its champaran meat.

== History ==
Mathura was founded by Bodha Shah, whose descendants remain there. Historically, this land was ruled by the Kalachuri(Kalwar) dynasty. Kalwar ruler Madan Mohan Prasad led the village's modernization.Since independence, most of the Gram Pradhan (Mukhiya) have been from this family.

== Education ==
The Rajkiya Ram Chandra Lalji High and Middle Schools operate there.These Schools are established by descendents of Bodha shah.

== Culture ==
The village hosts ancient Shiva and Goddess Durga Temples.

== Geography ==
The village is located along the Narkatiyaganj-Raxaul railway and road network, 12 kilometers from the India/Nepal border.

== Economy ==
The village traditional depended on agriculture. Agriculture remains a primary source of income for many residents. The main crops include paddy, mustard, sugarcane, and wheat.

Mathura includes a chauk (marketplace) with approximately 500 shops.

== Demographics ==
According to the 2011 Indian census, Mathura had 2,677 residents living in 496 households. 52.7% were males and 47.2% females. The average literacy rate was 36.12%, significantly lower than the national average of 74%. The male literacy rate was 66.49%, while the female literacy rate was 33.5%. 22.2% of its population was under 6.
