= Culture of Guyana =

Guyanese culture reflects the influence of Indian, African, Amerindian, British, Portuguese, Chinese, Creole, and Dutch cultures. Guyana is part of the mainland Caribbean region. Guyanese culture shares a continuum with the cultures of islands in the West Indies.

== Holidays ==
Celebrations in Guyana reflect the diverse origins of its people. The typical European holidays such as Easter and Christmas are often observed. The annual festival of Mashramani, a holiday to celebrate Guyana's independence (inspired by Amerindian festivals), is popular throughout Guyana. Hindu holidays (including Diwali and Phagwah) are regularly participated in by Guyana's Hindu population.

== Literature and theatre ==
Colonial society put a greater value on entertainment from Europe than locally produced ones, and for the most part sought to emulate popular Victorian English styles. Abolition of slavery and the end of indenture were factors in a growing middle class, and towards the middle of the 20th century, there was a growing need for arts that reflected the reality of life and people of the Caribbean region.

Notable Guyanese authors include Edgar Mittelholzer, Wilson Harris, Jan Carew, Denis Williams, Roy A. K. Heath, Fred D'Aguiar, David Dabydeen, Martin Carter and Shana Yardan. and E. R. Braithwaite. Other writers who have made a significant contribution to Guyanese literary culture include Fred D'Aguiar, David Dabydeen, Martin Carter and Shana Yardan.

Theatre was historically productions of European works. Local theatre for the African and Indian Guyanese middle-class began in the early 20th century. It became more diverse in the 1950s, but declined in the 1980s.

Repertory theatres in the country of Guyana include the Theatre Guild of Guyana Playhouse – the oldest Theatrical and Performance facility in Guyana, and the second oldest in the Caribbean. The Theatre Guild itself was founded in 1957, with the Theatre Guild Playhouse opening a few years later, in 1960. The Theatre Guild of Guyana was incorporated on September 9, 1961. It operates as a non-profit, volunteer-run performing arts organization, independent of the Guyanese government.

Guyanese actors who have been successful internationally include Harry Baird, Norman Beaton, Anthony Chinn, Tommy Eytle, Cy Grant, Ram John Holder, Pauline Melville, Carmen Munroe, Sol Raye, and Ian Valz.

== Music and visual arts ==
Guyana's musical tradition is a mix of African, indigenous Guyanese, European, and Latin elements. The most popular type of music is Calypso and its offshoots and mixes, like in other parts of the Eastern Caribbean. The various types of popular music include calypso music, reggae music, chutney music, soca music, local Guyanese soca-chutney, and Bollywood film songs (or other music from the Indian subcontinent).

Globalization has brought sounds from neighbouring countries to Guyana in recent years, with genres such as Merengue, Bachata, Salsa, with Reggaeton being the most popular, and influencing the local music.

Popular Guyanese performers include Billy (William) Moore, Terry Gajraj, Mark Holder, Eddy Grant, Dave Martins & the Tradewinds, Aubrey Cummings and Nicky Porter. Among the most successful Guyanese record producers are Eddy Grant, Terry Gajraj and Dave Martin.

Common themes in Guyanese visual art include Caribbean Amerindian themes, the ethnic diversity of the population and the natural environment.

Modern and contemporary visual artists living in, or originally from, Guyana include Stanley Greaves, Ronald Savory, Philip Moore, Donald Locke, Frank Bowling, Hew Locke, Roshini Kempadoo, Leila Locke, George Simon and Aubrey Williams.

== Film ==
Bollywood films and music are popular in Guyana, especially among the Indo-Guyanese population. When famed Bollywood playback singer, Lata Mangeshkar visited Guyana, she was given a key to the capital city of Guyana, Georgetown.

== Architecture ==
Georgetown, Guyana's capital is mainly built below sea level, and is protected by a Dutch engineered sea wall and canal system dating from the 18th century. Wooden colonial architecture prevail in Guyana, with elaborate Demerara style houses on stilts featuring jalousie windows and ornate fretwork suited to the tropical climate and flood prone terrain.

As a result of Guyana's ethnic diversity, the country's architecture features Hindi temples, mosques, and churches as well as Amerindian dwelling forms in the country's rainforest.

== Sports ==
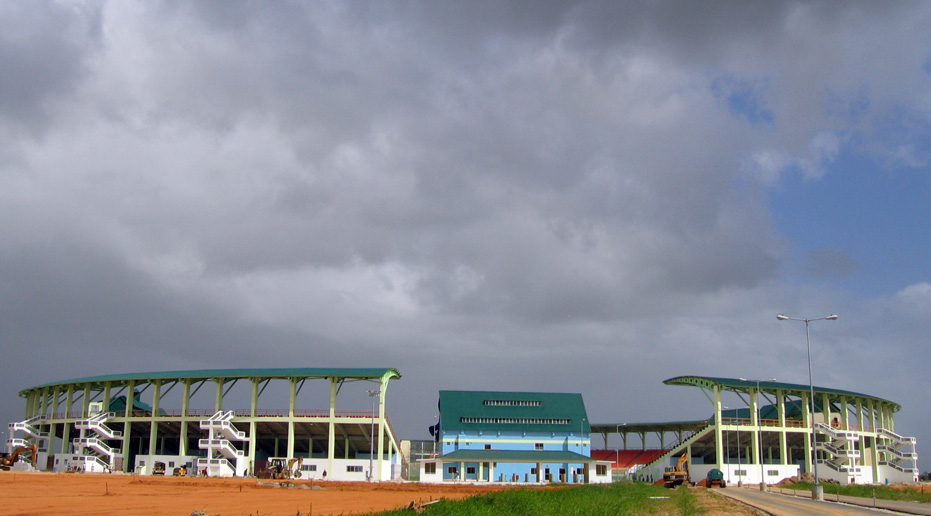
Providence Stadium as seen from the East Bank Highway.

The most-played sports in Guyana are cricket, basketball and football. Key sport organizations in Guyana include the government's Ministry of Culture, Youth and Sport; the Guyana Cricket Board; Guyana Amateur Basketball Federation; and the Guyana Football Federation. Professional level sports have suffered from lack of funding, lacking access to facilities and training. Guyana plays as part of West Indies team for international cricket since 1928.

Guyana's national football teams, the Golden Jaguars and the Lady Jaguars, participate at the international level. A number of boxers have done well at the international level, including Andrew Lewis, Vivian Harris, Wayne Braithwaite. Boxing is the only sport that has earned Guyana an Olympic medal.

=== Cricket ===
Cricket has been an important vehicle for cultural unity across the Caribbean. In British Guiana, it represented a way for the non-white lower classes to earn recognition in colonial society. It was introduced to Guyana by British military teams, and has since become dominated by Afro and Indo-Guyanese. The West Indies team victory in 1950 against England at Lord's, "still remains the single most satisfying moment in the history of West Indies cricket" also inspired a calypso.

Guyana hosted international cricket matches as part of the 2007 Cricket World Cup. The new 15,000-seat Providence Stadium, also referred to as Guyana National Stadium, was built in time for the World Cup and was ready for the beginning of play on March 28. At the first international game of CWC 2007 at the stadium, Lasith Malinga of the Sri Lankan team performed a "helmet trick" or "double hat-trick" (four wickets in four consecutive deliveries).

== Cuisine ==
Guyanese cuisine is mostly similar to the cuisine of the rest of the Anglo-Caribbean, especially Trinidad and Tobago, as well as the Dutch-speaking Suriname (where the ethnic mix is somewhat similar). The food reflects the ethnic makeup of the country and its colonial history, and includes Indian-South Asian, West African, Creole, Portuguese, Amerindian, Chinese, Dutch, British, and North American influences and dishes. The food is diverse and includes dishes such as dal bhat, curry, roti, kitchrie, and cook-up rice (the local variation on the Anglo-Caribbean rice and peas). The one-pot meal, while not the national dish, is one of the most cooked dishes.

Dishes have been adapted to Guyanese tastes, often by the addition of herbs and spices. Unique preparations include Guyana pepperpot, a stew of Amerindian origin made with meat, and cassareep, a bitter extract of the cassava. Other common dishes are cassava bread, stews, and metemgee, a thick, rich type of soup with ground provisions, coconut milk, and large dumplings called duff, eaten with fried fish or chicken. Homemade bread-making, an art in many villages, is a reflection of the British influence that includes pastries such as cheese rolls, pine tarts, and patties.

Many Indo-Guyanese dishes have their ultimate origins in Bhojpuri and Awadhi cuisine. These include satwa, pholourie, bara, baigan (balanjay) chokha, dhal bhat (dhal and rice), kitchrie, laapsi, mohanbhog, pera, mithai, puri, guruma/gurumba, gulgula, paratha, dhalpuri, and several other variations of Indian dishes. Curry is widely popular in Guyana and most types of meat can be curried: chicken, seafood, goat, lamb, duck, and beef. Some dishes have their origin in South Indian cuisine such as waday, dosay, murgatani, and rasam.

Caribbean ground provisions (known colloquially as "provisions") are part of the staple diet and include cassava, sweet potato, and eddoes. There is an abundance of fresh fruits, vegetables and seafood on the coast.

Most individuals use fresh fruits to make their own beverages, which are called "local drink", made from readily available fruits or other parts of plants. Popular homemade drinks are lime wash (like lemonade); pine drink (from a pineapple); mauby, made from the bark of a tree; sorrel drink, made from hibiscus; ginger beer (made from ginger root); and peanut punch.

Fresh fish and seafood are an integral part of the Guyanese diet, especially in rural areas and small villages along the coast. Popular fish types include gilbaka, butter fish, tilapia, catfish, and hassa (Hoplosternum). Crab soups with okra from the Berbice coastal region resemble Louisiana Creole soups like gumbo.

Christmas and Old Year's Night (New Year) is the most celebrated time for Guyanese for food and festivities. Advance preparation starts with the preparation and soaking of fruits and rum or wine for black cake weeks or sometimes months ahead to intensify the flavour. Local drinks such as ginger beer, mauby and sorrel are fermented and require a sitting period prior to making. Ginger beer is the Christmas drink of choice, similar to the popularity of eggnog in North America. Homemade bread is common in Guyana. During the winter holidays, time-consuming dishes such as Guyana pepperpot, garlic pork, and black cake, as well as sponge cake, are typical and traditional.

Guyanese-style Chinese food and fried chicken are common restaurant and take-out items in bigger towns in Guyana. Popular Chinese dishes include lo mein, chow mein, and "chicken in the ruff" (fried rice with Chinese-style fried chicken).

== Folklore ==
Guyanese folklore is similar to Caribbean folklore, mixed with African, Indian, Amerindian, and British/European beliefs. Folklores are the cultural beliefs and demonstrations that bind people from a group and help them to form an identity. These expressions can be in the form of dances, food, festivals, proverbs, stories, legends, music, festivals and costumes. Guyanese myths have their foundations in cultural influences from Amerindian, European, African and Indian backgrounds. Some of these beliefs are similar to the Caribbean diaspora while some are uniquely Guyanese. Some known Guyanese myths include:

The Old Higue (Hag)

An Old Higue is an old woman, who can also be depicted as a man, that becomes a ball of fire at night and flies through the air seeking babies' blood. After shedding her skin, she places it in a calabash gourd or in a tree for safekeeping and then proceeds to travel until she finds a newborn baby. She draws blood from the infant who then becomes blue and dies. The belief of this being is still upheld in many rural areas and people usually set traps to catch the old higue after which they would beat her with a manicole broom. The manicole broom is left over the doorway along with a bowl of uncooked rice which she cannot resist counting. When the Old Higue begins to count the rice grain she has to be careful not to drop it, or she would have to restart her undertaking which may keep her into the morning hours and get her caught by the family. People also believe that if the Old Higue's skin is found, it should be pounded with salt and pepper and left where found. Once the old higue puts back the on their body it will burn them to death.

Obeah

Obeah is a practice stemming from African origins passed down from the times of slavery. This is a practice where people petition to dead ancestors for assistance with issues like health, family, work, love, or seeking favour and protection. An offering and commitment have to be made after which the instructions given should be followed precisely.

Cumfa

This is an African-style dance which includes the beating of drums. The drums are an instrument used to summons spirit into a human host's body. The dancers perform ceremonial, acrobatic and energetic dances sometimes over broken bottles and whilst eating fire in tribute to spirits and ancestors. The dancers are unscathed and do not have recollection of the performance once the spirit leaves the body.

Dmitri Allicock. (2012). Myths, Legends, Folktales and Fables of Guyana. Retrieved from: https://guyaneseonline.files.wordpress.com/2012/10/myths-legends-folktales-and-fables-of-guyana.pdf

== Language ==
English is the main language, and Guyana is the only English-speaking country in South America, although many people in neighboring Suriname also speak English. British English is taught in school and used in Government and business. Guyanese creole, a pidgin of 17th-century English, African and Hindi words, is used at home and on the street. It is the same as creoles spoken in the Eastern Caribbean such Barbados, Trinidad and Tobago, and St. Vincent but with different accent or emphasis on how the words are pronounced.

There are also a small number of trace words from the extinct Dutch Creoles, and French. Depending on the race of the person and location, the accent and sprinkling of other words can also change. An example of this would be an Indo Guyanese who would use a word or two words left over from when they spoke Hindi.

As time passes, British terms and phrases for things are being replaced by American ones, due to U.S. influence. Where once people would have said "flats" as in England, the term "apartment" is now being used by some people.

== Religion ==
There are three major religions in Guyana; Christianity, Islam, and Hinduism.
