= Fry jack =

Traditional dish in Belizean cuisine

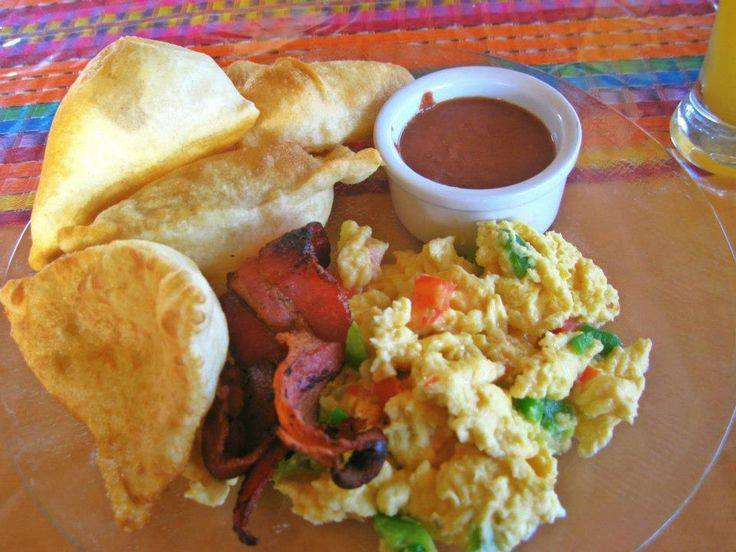
Fry jacks served with scrambled eggs

Fry jacks are a traditional dish in Belizean cuisine. They are deep-fried dough pieces served for breakfast, and can be shaped as circles or triangles.

== Overview ==
Fry jacks are not unique to Belize. Other names are used in various countries around the world including beignets in New Orleans (United States), sopaipillas in Mexico, other Latin American countries and the Southwestern United States, or simply ‘fried dough’.

Preparation begins with flour and other ingredients, typically including baking powder, salt, vegetable oil and water. The mix is then pan-cooked. Preparation involves creating the dough and then allowing it time to proof, or rise. Once the dough has risen, the dough is rolled out and then cut into strips or pieces. After being pan-cooked in oil, they may be topped with ingredients such as jam, beans or cheese.

== See also ==
- Biscuit
- List of fried dough foods
- Pancake
- Poori
