= Caldo de costilla =

Colombian broth dish

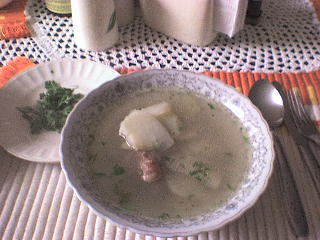
- A caldo de costilla is better if served hot and with cilantro leaves.
- Alternative names: Levantamuertos
- Type: Soup
- Course: Breakfast
- Place of origin: Colombia
- Region or state: South America
- Associated cuisine: Colombia
- Serving temperature: Hot
- Main ingredients: Beef ribs, water, potatoes, garlic, onions, cilantro leaves

Caldo de costilla (Spanish for rib broth) is a dish typical of Colombian cuisine, from the Andean region. It is made mainly from beef ribs boiled in water with slices of potato, some garlic, onion and cilantro leaves.

The caldo de costilla is eaten mainly during breakfast, and it is eaten often with arepa, chocolate and bread. It has been used as a remedy for hangover; it is referred to as levantamuertos (death's awaker). Many restaurants in areas with a high concentration of bars and clubs will stay open all night so that customers may gain energy with a caldo de costilla.

== See also ==
- Colombian cuisine
- List of soups
- Paisa Region
