= Goat curry =

Spicy stew

Curry Goat
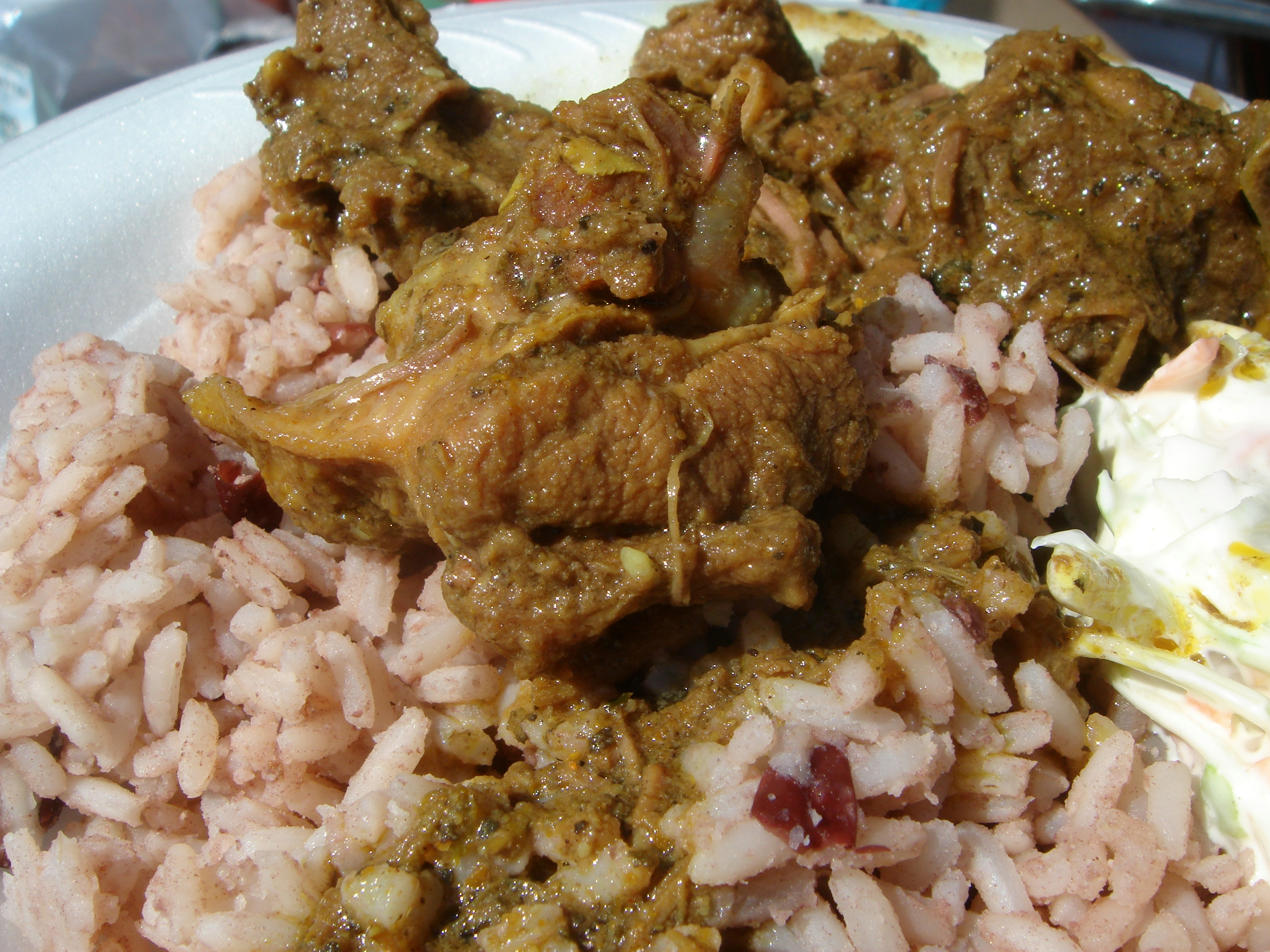
- A plate of curry goat with rice and peas. (Jamaican style)
- Alternative names: Burmese: ဆိတ်သားနှပ် (hseik-tha hnat); Hindi: Bakri curry Indonesian: kari kambing Malay: kari kambing
- Type: Curry
- Place of origin: Indian subcontinent
- Region or state: Indian subcontinent (India, Pakistan, Bangladesh, Sri Lanka, Nepal), Southeast Asia (Myanmar, Indonesia, Malaysia and Vietnam) and the Caribbean (Trinidad and Tobago, Jamaica, Guyana and Suriname)
- Main ingredients: Goat meat, curry powder, peppers, curry leaves, Indian spices
- Variations: Goat roti
- Similar dishes: Mutton curry

Goat curry (Malay: kari kambing, Indonesian: kari kambing or gulai kambing), curried goat, or curry goat is a curry dish prepared with goat meat, originating from the Indian subcontinent. The dish is a staple in Southeast Asian cuisine, Caribbean cuisine, and the cuisine of the Indian subcontinent. In the Caribbean and Southeast Asia, the dish was brought to the region by the Indian diaspora, and has subsequently influenced the respective local cuisines. This dish has also spread throughout the Indo-Caribbean diaspora in North America and Europe.

== Regional versions ==
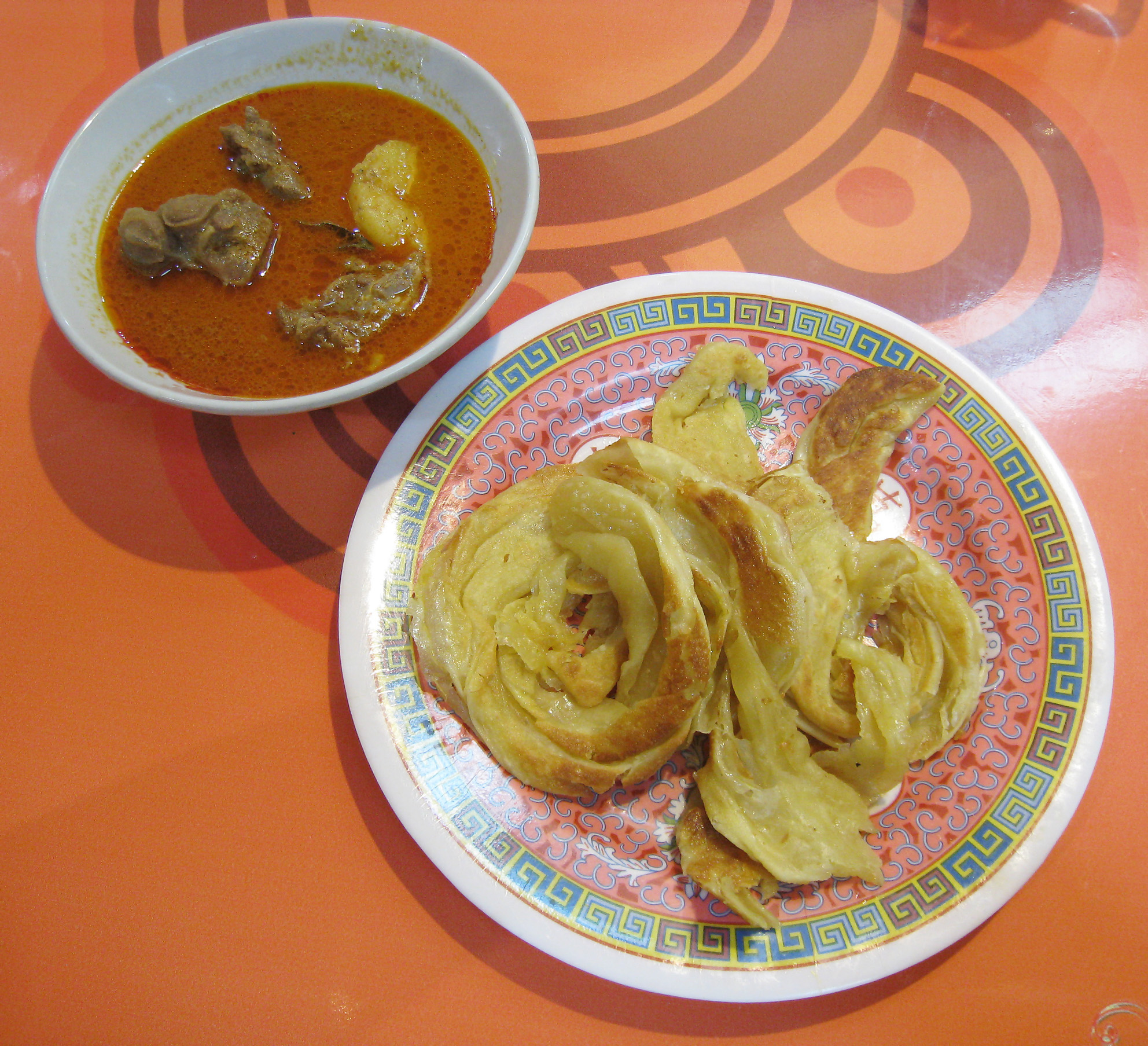
Roti cane served with kari kambing (goat meat and potato curry), in an Aceh restaurant, Indonesia

In Burmese cuisine, goat curry, called seittha hnat (ဆိတ်သားနှပ်), is a common Burmese curry, consisting of braised curry spiced with masala, cinnamon sticks, bay leaf, and cloves.

In Indonesia, the dish is called kari kambing, and usually served with roti cane flatbread or steamed rice. Kare or kari (curry) is an Indian-influenced dish commonly found in Indonesia, Malaysia and Singapore. Goat curry is often eaten among the Muslim community in the region.

Curried goat is a dish that is made for special occasions in India, Bangladesh, Pakistan, and Nepal. Goat is a meat of choice for Hindus because they do not eat beef and for Muslims because they do not eat pork. Therefore, the dish serves as a good medium. In Jamaica, the dish is popular at parties and on special occasions. It is flavoured with a spice mix that is typical of Indo-Jamaican cooking. Curried goat is also a popular dish in Trinidad. It is also eaten in wrapped roti commonly served at roti shops. This dish is usually served with rice, dal bhat, or roti. Restaurants in North America and Europe may serve other typical Caribbean side dishes such as fried plantain as an accompaniment. There are many variations on the dish that include using mutton when goat is not available or bulking it out with potatoes.

It is frequently prepared and eaten during Eid al-Adha, when a goat is sacrificed by Muslim Indo-Caribbeans.

In Britain, the carnivals in St Pauls, Bristol and Notting Hill, London and other Caribbean cultural events will usually have curried goat available as well as other regional foods.

== See also ==
- List of goat dishes
