= Aubrey Cummings =

Guyanese musician and singer

- Born: Aubrey Augustus Cummings; 1947; British Guiana
- Died: 14 April 2010 (aged 62–63); Saint Michael, Barbados
- Occupations: Musician and singer

Aubrey Cummings (1947 – 14 April 2010) was a renowned Guyanese musician and singer, who in 1978 migrated to Barbados. He was also an artist.

== Biography ==
Aubrey Augustus Cummings was born in 1947, into an Alberttown home, and attended Queenstown Roman Catholic Primary School.

He joined the group Bumble and the Saints in 1965. He went on to be the lead singer for the Rhythmnaires and the Dominators, also playing rhythm guitar and doing arrangements. He left the Dominators in 1973 and helped form another band called the Telstars, having a popular hit with "So Lucky in My Life". The Telstars toured Brazil, later visiting Barbados and recording their album Orbiting, and in 1975 Cummings returned for six months to Brazil, where he was well received in Rio and Brasilia.

In 1978, Cummings migrated to Barbados, and built an active career as a guitarist and vocalist — musicians with whom he played include John Roett, Charlie King, Nicholas Branker, and Johnny Glasgow (Linus Yaw) — and he subsequently established himself as a painter. His musical style has been compared to that of Louis Armstrong.

His CD Moon Over Me was issued in 2005.

He was found dead in his car at Haggatt Hall, Saint Michael, Barbados, on the evening of 14 April 2010.
