= Piracaldo =

Paraguayan fish soup

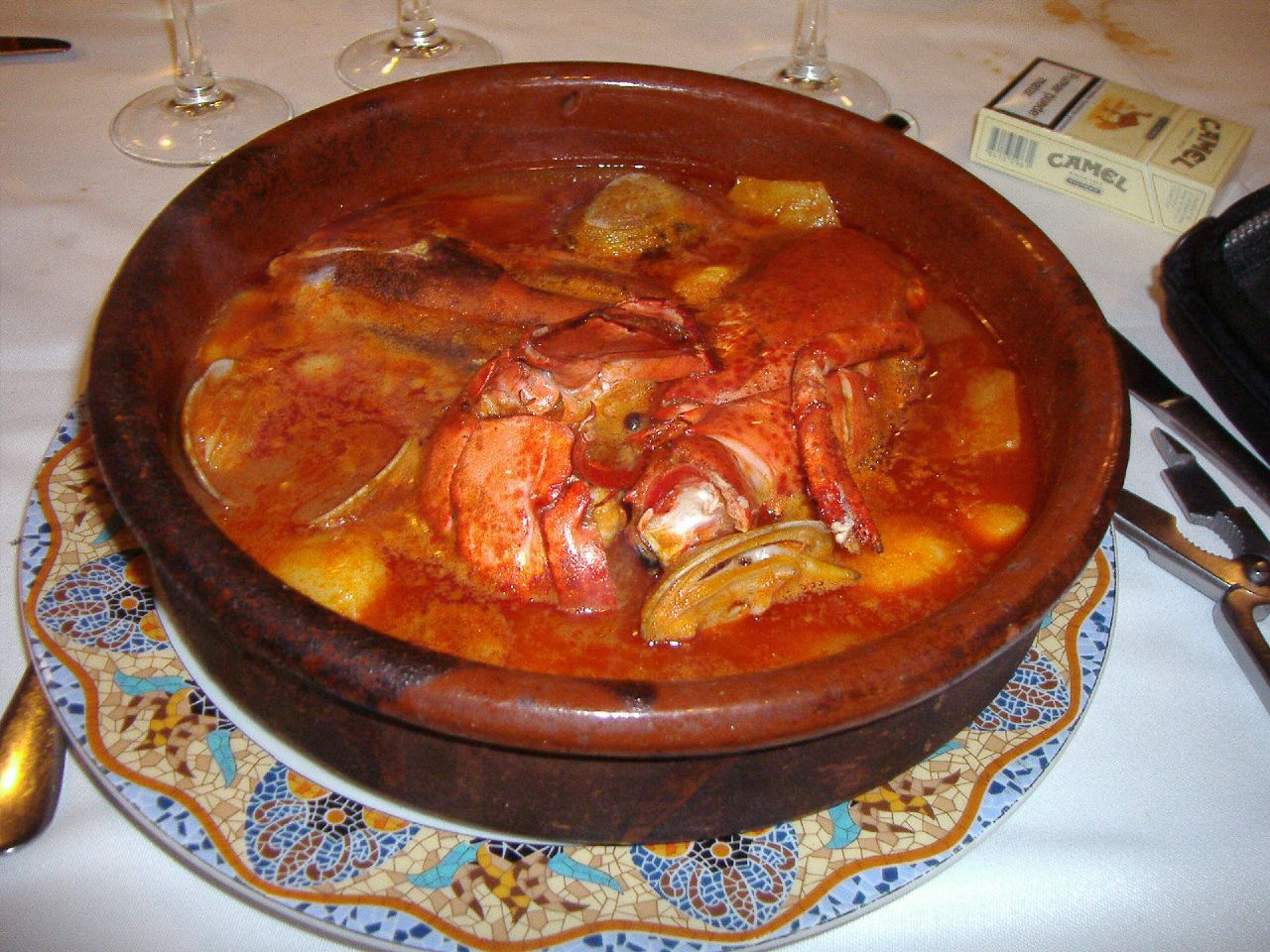
- Type: Fish soup
- Place of origin: Paraguay
- Main ingredients: River fish (mandi'y, tare'y), fat, onions, tomatoes, green or red bell peppers

Piracaldo is a fish soup that is part of the traditional cuisine of Paraguay. The Guarani word Pira means "fish".

== History ==
The soup is very high in calorie content and in protein. This has its origins in the circumstances after the Paraguayan War (1864 to 1870). The war made food scarce, so daily meals were limited and had to be calorie and nutrient dense.

Margarita Miro Ibars, a scholar of Paraguayan culinary anthropology, says "… all Guarani groups were major consumers of fish and prepared a fish meal. Fish was the basic food protein, along with game hens similar to those of Spain and abundant game animals… "

== Ingredients ==
Traditionally the fish used for pira caldo are mainly smaller river fish such as the mandi'y and tare'y, from the armored catfish family. Other ingredients include fat, onion, tomatoes, green or red bell peppers, parsley, pepper, spices, and salt.

== Preparation ==
The pira caldo as most popularly prepared begins with frying the vegetables in a little beef or pork fat. Then boiled water and the fish are added with salt and spices. When the fish is cooked and the soup is thick, some chopped chili pepper is added.

As pira caldo is a widespread dish, there are a number of variations. One of them which constitutes a rich source of protein is prepared by running the cooked fish through a small mill. This method of preparation avoids the problem of small children choking on the bones.
