= Dal puri =

Flatbread stuffed with legumes

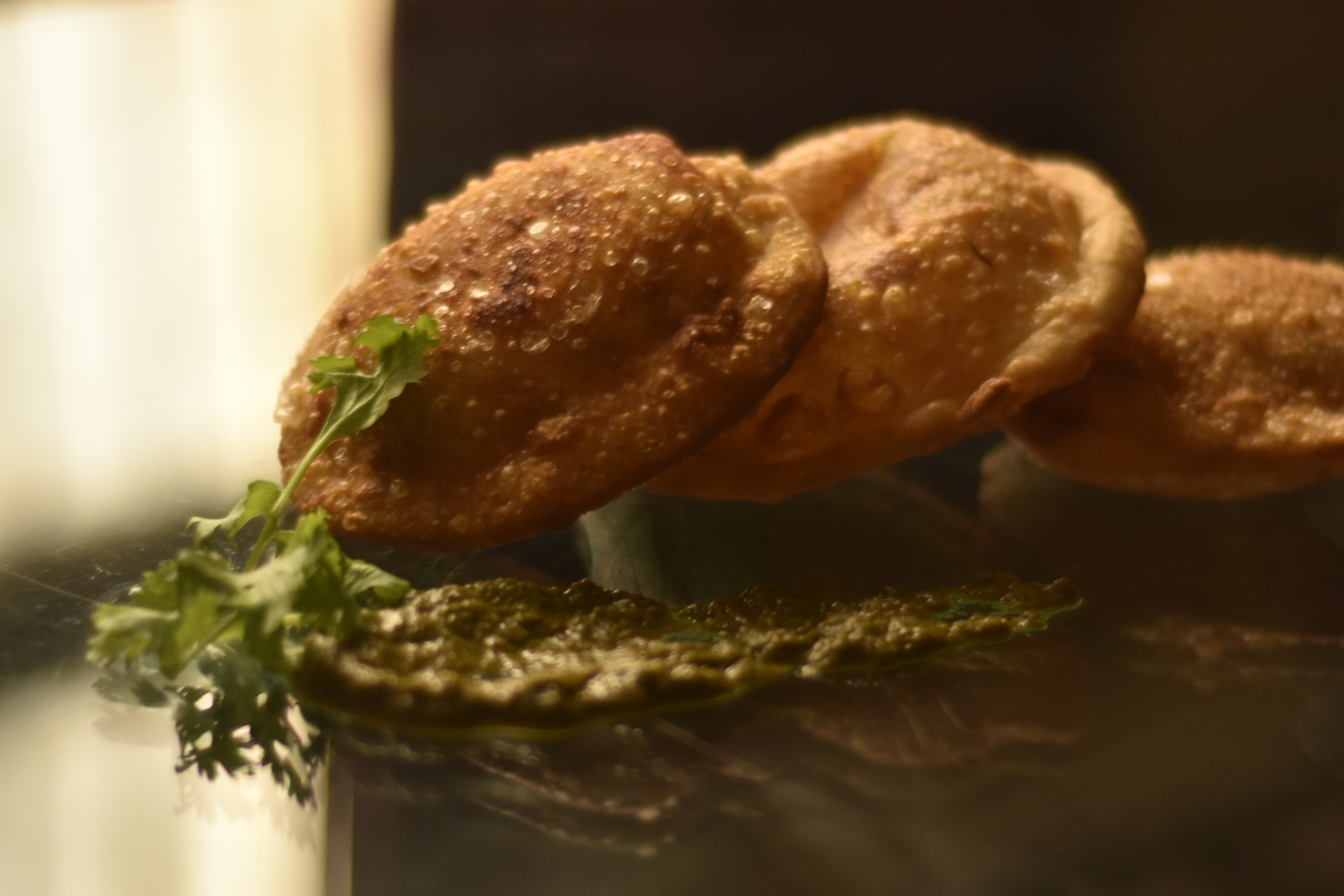
- Bengali dal puri
- Alternative names: Dhalpuri roti (Caribbean); Dholl puri (Mauritius)
- Type: Flatbread, roti
- Place of origin: South Asia
- Associated cuisine: South Asia (including Bengali and Bhojpuri); Caribbean (including Trinidad and Tobago and Guyana); Mauritius
- Main ingredients: White flour (Caribbean, Mauritius) or whole wheat flour (India); Dal, such as chickpeas (India, Mauritius) or split peas (Caribbean, Mauritius))

Dal puri is a type of flatbread filled with dal originating in South Asian cuisine, with variants eaten in regions with Indian diasporas. The South Asian version is a type of puri, a deep-fried flatbread made of whole wheat flour, and uses dal made of chickpeas or lentils. Its variants are dhalpuri roti in Caribbean cuisine and dholl puri in Mauritian cuisine, both of which instead use white flour and are griddle-baked on a tava. Split peas are a common filling for both variants. Dhalpuri and dholl puri are both wrapped around curry as sandwiches and served as street food.

Regions including the Caribbean and Mauritius received Indian indentured labourers during the 20th century, who were largely from the Bhojpuri ethnic group; they introduced their foods and may have made dal puri out of necessity. In the modern day, it is eaten across ethnic groups in these regions but is less common in India. In the Caribbean, including in Trinidad and Tobago, dhalpuri is classified as a roti, and the sandwich made from it is also known as roti. In Mauritius, dholl puri is considered a national dish.

== Description ==
Dal puri is a flatbread filled with crushed dal, such as mung beans or split peas. It is a type of roti, a broad category of unleavened flatbreads in Indian and Indo-Caribbean cuisine.

=== South Asian dal puri ===
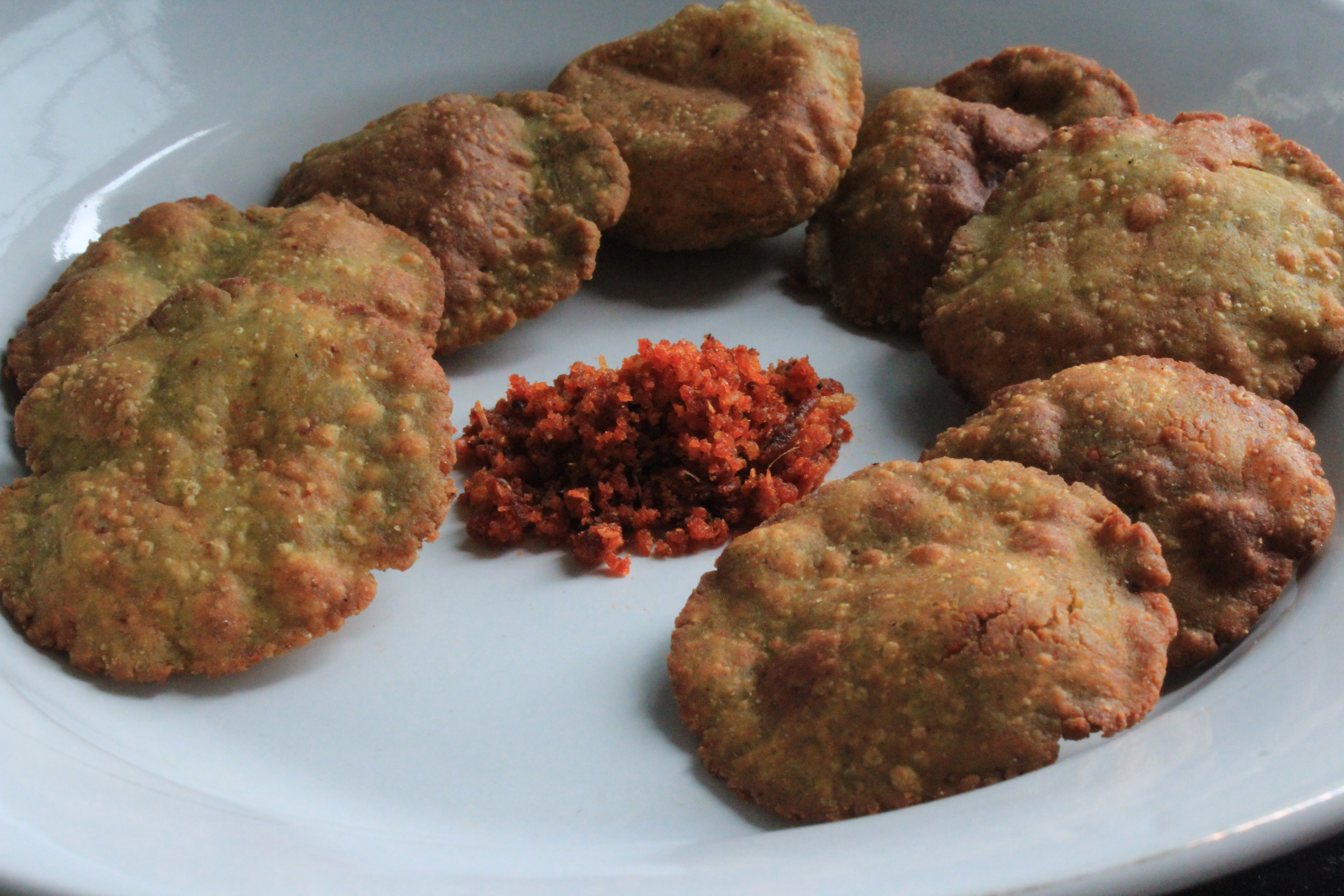
Indian dal puri

In India, dal puri is a deep-fried flatbread made of whole wheat flour, stuffed with yellow lentils or Bengal gram chickpeas. The chickpeas are boiled with turmeric, then mashed and spiced with garam masala. Dal puri is crispy with a golden-brown color. It is served for breakfast in North India, and it may be paired with curry, chutney, or yoghurt. In Bengali cuisine, dal puri, made of chickpeas, is distinguished from radhabollobhi, made of urad dal. The Bengali dal puri is made of maida, a type of white flour.

=== Caribbean dhalpuri ===
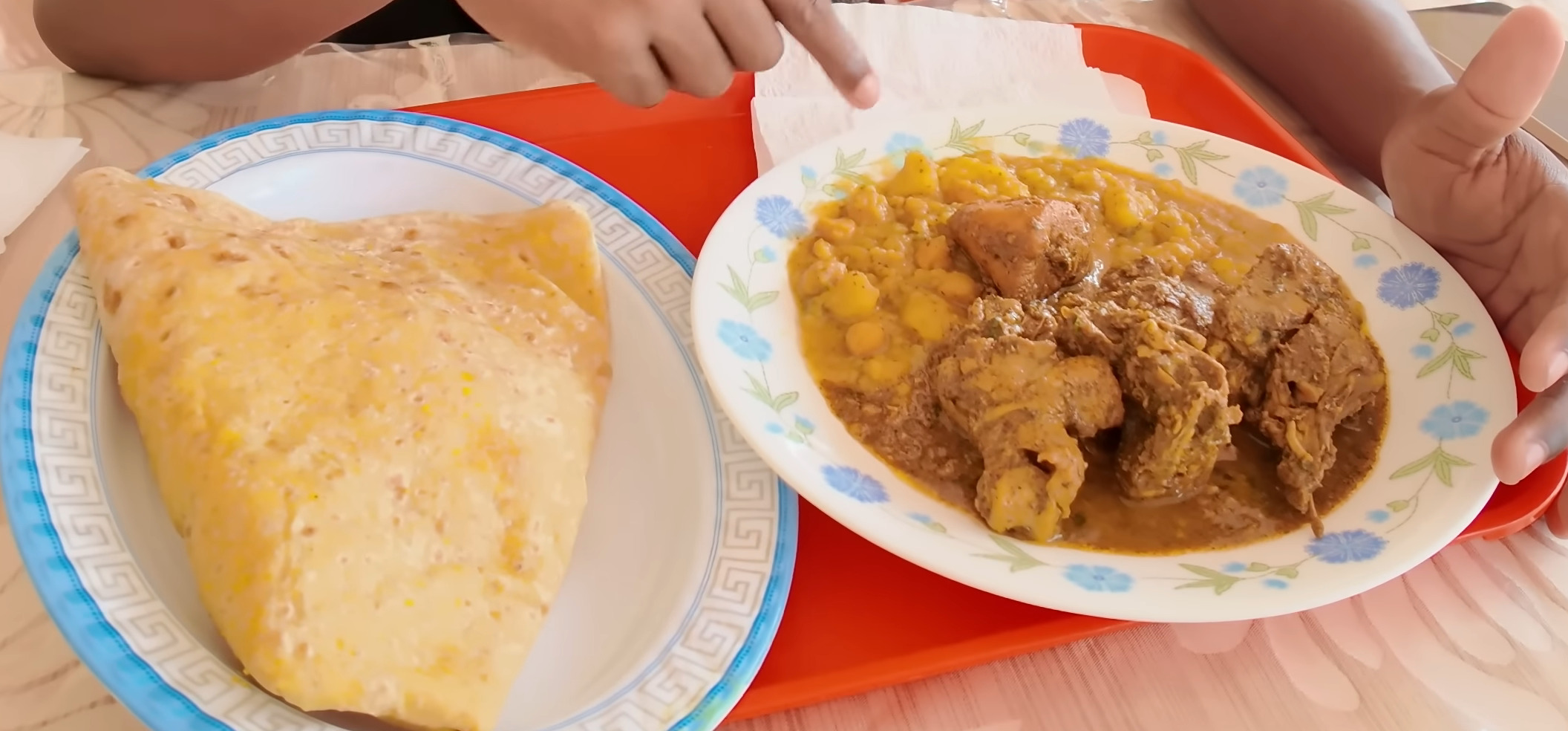
A dhalpuri next to a plate of curry chicken, served in Trinidad

Dhalpuri roti
Nutritional value per 100 g (3.5 oz)
- Energy: 1,300 kJ (310 kcal)
- Carbohydrates: 50.8
- Sugars: 2.3
- Dietary fiber: 5.7
- Fat: 7.6
- Saturated: 1.1
- Monounsaturated: 3.9
- Polyunsaturated omega−3 omega−6: 4.0 0.0 0.3
- Protein: 9.7
Vitamins and minerals
Vitamins	Quantity %DV^{†}
Vitamin A equiv.	0% 0.8 μg
Thiamine (B1)	42% 0.5 mg
Riboflavin (B2)	23% 0.3 mg
Niacin (B3)	22% 3.5 mg
Pantothenic acid (B5)	10% 0.5 mg
Vitamin B6	6% 0.1 mg
Folate (B9)	34% 135 μg
Vitamin B12	0% 0.0 μg
Vitamin C	1% 0.8 mg
Vitamin D	0% 0.9 IU
Vitamin E	1% 0.1 mg
Vitamin K	2% 2.6 μg
Minerals	Quantity %DV^{†}
Calcium	3% 44.8 mg
Iron	18% 3.2 mg
Magnesium	7% 30.7 mg
Manganese	26% 0.6 mg
Potassium	8% 239 mg
Selenium	33% 17.9 μg
Sodium	20% 470 mg
Zinc	8% 0.9 mg
- Other constituents: Quantity
- Cholesterol: 0.3
- ^{†}Percentages estimated using US recommendations for adults, except for potassium, which is estimated based on expert recommendation from the National Academies.

In Indo-Caribbean cuisine, dhalpuri roti (Note: Also spelled dhallpourri in Trinidad and Tobago) is adapted from the Indian dal puri, but it is larger, uses white flour and split peas, and is cooked on a griddle or tava rather than being deep-fried. The cooking method makes it similar to an Indian stuffed paratha but much larger. It is wider than a dinner plate, and it may be so thin that it is translucent. It is less crispy and paler than the Indian version. It is denser than other rotis due to the filling. The dough is leavened, making it stretchy; baking powder may be used as the leavening agent.

To make the filling, the dal is boiled, then ground. In Guyana, the filling is spiced with garlic, cumin, and chilli powder; in Trinidad, it uses these in addition to turmeric and culantro. A portion of the filling is placed on each round of dough, while the dough is pressed and sealed around it before being rolled out.

In the cuisine of Trinidad and Tobago, dhalpuri is one of the most common types of roti, along with buss-up-shut and sada roti. It is often served as a sandwich with curry. It is folded into a square over the filling, which may include potatoes, chicken, prawns, or sea snails, then wrapped in paper. At fast food establishments known as roti shops, this item is simply known as a roti. (Note: A dhalpuri on its own is sometimes referred to as a roti skin in Trinidad and Tobago.) This may be served with mango chutney. In Guyana, dhalpuri is often served with fish cakes, a type of fritter originating in English cuisine.

=== Mauritian dholl puri ===
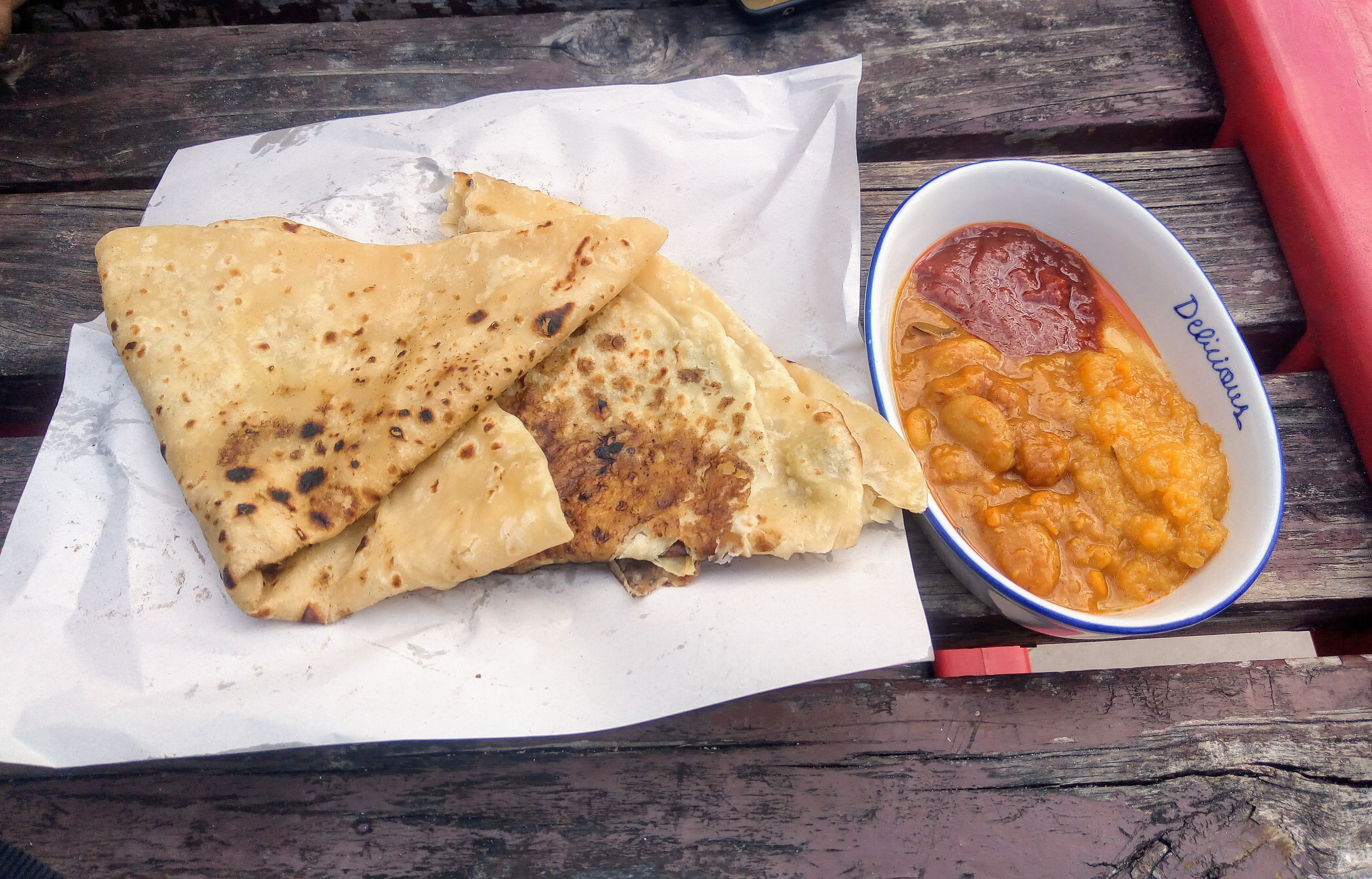
Dholl puri served in Mauritius

In Mauritian cuisine, dholl puri is a thin, soft flatbread made of white flour, stuffed with chickpeas or split peas. It is baked on a tava. It is based on the Indian paratha and does not resemble the Indian puri, instead being similar to the sweet puran poli. The filling of dholl puri is flavored with only cumin, turmeric, and salt, though homemade preparations may add onions, coriander, or chillies. The water used to boil the chickpeas—producing aquafaba—is often reused for the dough; this contributes to the dough's texture, and the turmeric makes it yellow. It does not use baking powder. The preparation of dholl puri is the same across Mauritius.

Dholl puri has little flavour its own and is always served with other foods. It is served with vegetable curries, commonly including gros pois, made of beans, and rougaille, made of tomatoes. It may also be eaten with chilli paste, green chillies, pickles of pineapple or carrot, or kheer. Dholl puri is sold wrapped around various toppings, always with two of the bread, and covered in paper. It is commonly paired with a soft drink.

== History ==
The ancient Sanskrit text Sushruta Samhita mentions a pastry called phenika, stuffed with dal and minced meat, resembling the modern dal puri or kachori.

Indian indentured labourers were sent to the Caribbean, Mauritius, South Africa, and Fiji during the British colonial era, introducing dal puri to these regions. Many indentured labourers were Bhojpuri people, from what is now western Bihar and eastern Uttar Pradesh, who introduced their food to Trinidad and Tobago and Mauritius. According to historian Gina Agnew, indentured labourers created dal puri out of necessity on the ships to these regions. Labourers in both the Caribbean and Mauritius replaced whole wheat flour with white flour; their rations may have included white flour due to its longer shelf life. According to Mauritian media personality Venisha Gooriah Jugnarain, workers sent to Mauritius mixed dal into the dough by accident, as they conserved resources by using the same water to boil chickpeas and to make dough.

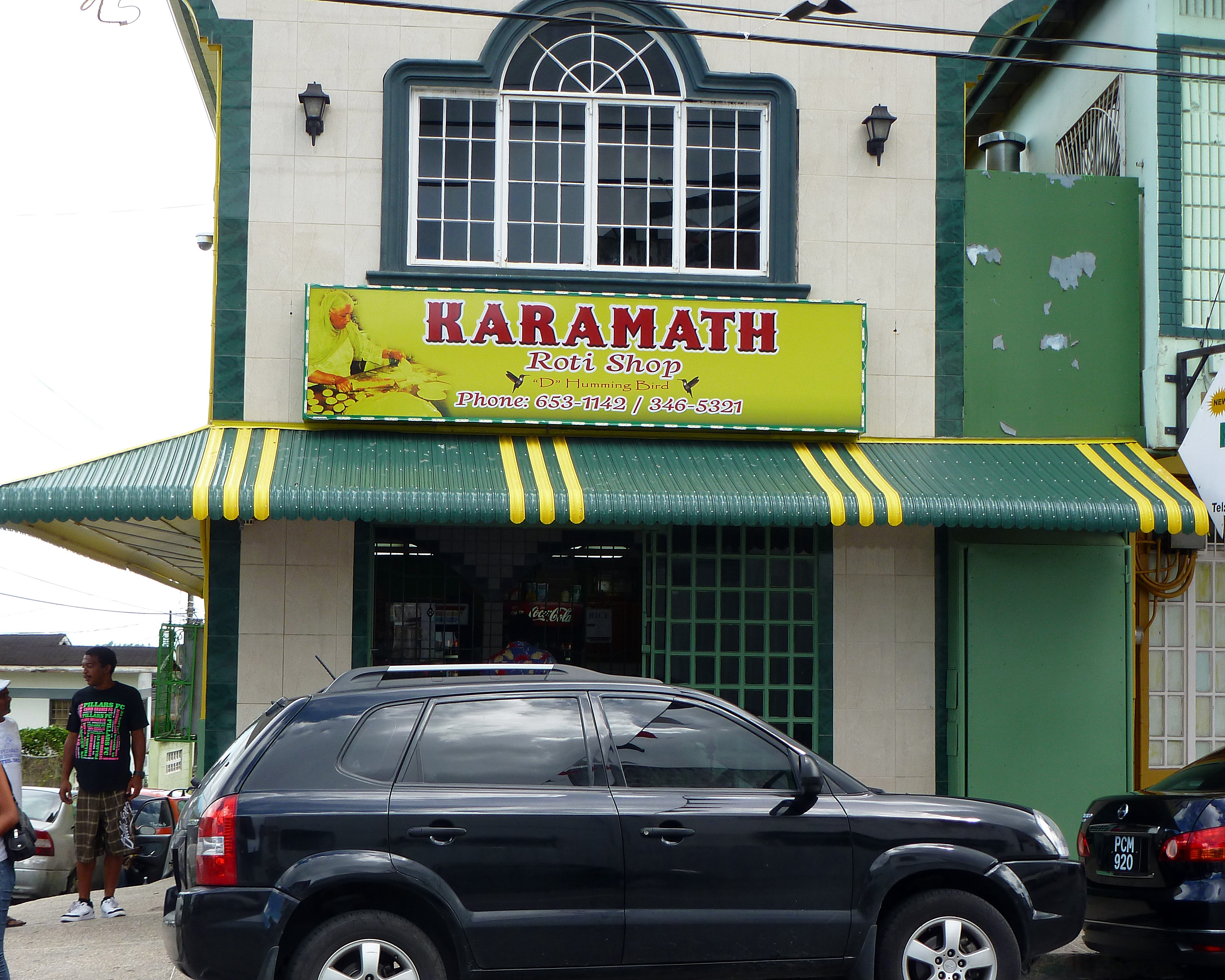
Hummingbird Roti Shop, founded in 1937, began serving dhalpuri wrapped around curry.

The first roti shop in Trinidad was Hummingbird Roti Shop, founded in 1937, which began wrapping curry in dhalpuri to make it easier to carry. This spread across the Caribbean. Dhalpuri was one of the first dishes to spread from the Indo-Trinidadian community to the national cuisine. Having previously been a labour-intensive dish for weekends and special occasions, it became a commercial product as it did not require specialized skills.

Mauritian dholl puri was pioneered by Ramawadh Ramsahye Maraz in the early 20th century, according to Le Défi Media Group; he began preparing it as a variation of tekwa, a deep-fried split pea pastry, which he cooked like roti to save money on frying oil. A smaller version of dholl puri was created by Dewa & Sons, initially a door-to-door vendor, in the 1960s.

The novelist Peggy Mohan described how dhalpuri is eaten in her 2008 book Jahajin. The Trinidadian-Canadian filmmaker Richard Fung created the 2012 documentary Dal Puri Diaspora, which details the spread of the dish from Bihar to Trinidad

== Consumption ==
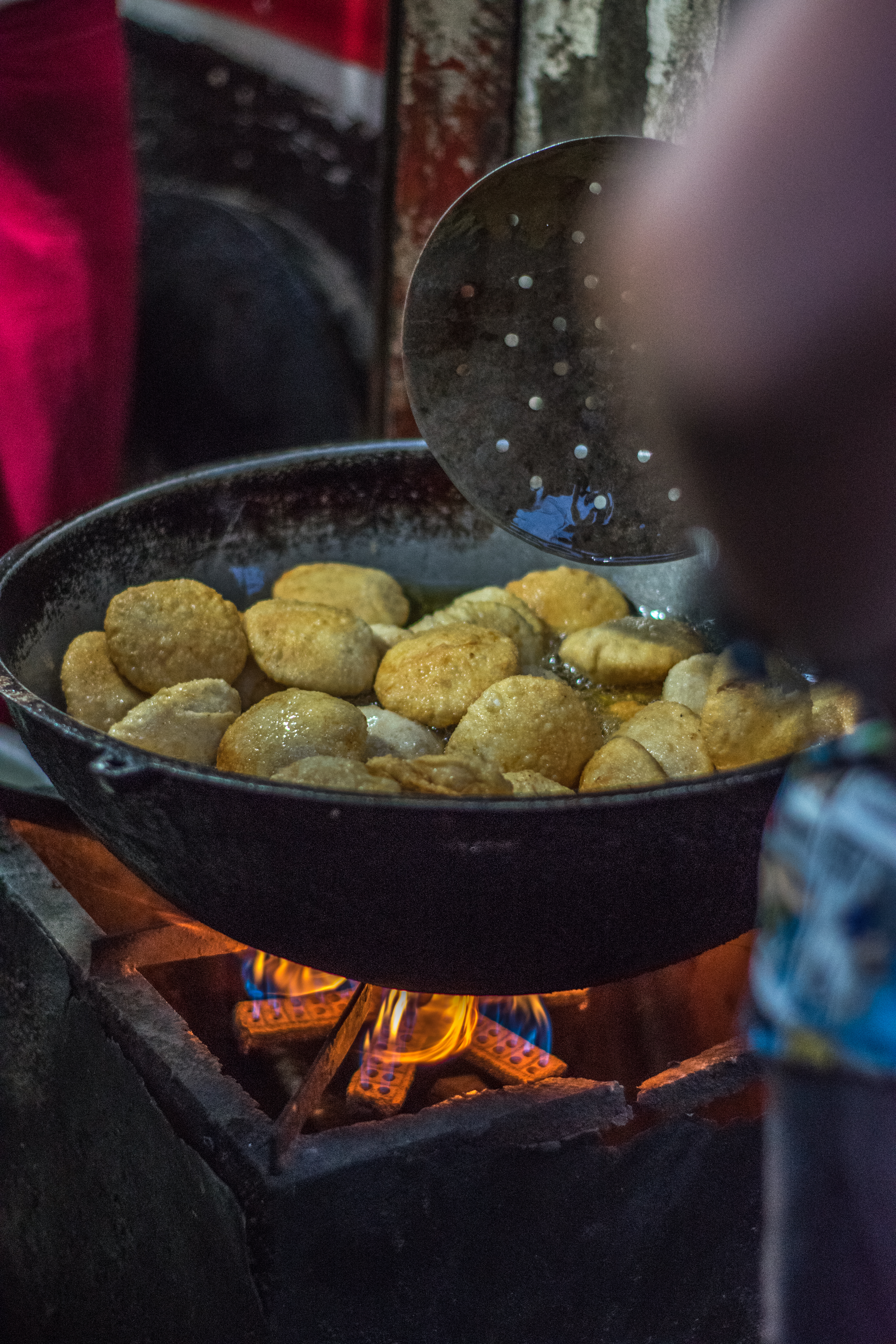
Dal puri is a common street food in Bangladesh.

Dal puri is found in many countries with histories of Indian indentured labourers. In most of these countries, it is associated with the national cuisine rather than an ethnic cuisine. It is primarily eaten as street food in Mauritius and the Caribbean, whereas people in India prepare it at home.

Despite being common in countries with Indian diasporas, dishes such as dal puri are less common in India. In the city of Kolkata, sweet shops serve it with aloo dum or chickpea dal for breakfast. Dal puri is common in Bangladeshi cuisine, eaten as a snack with tea, and often served as a street food. It is also found in rural areas in and around Uttar Pradesh.

Dhalpuri is one of many Indian dishes to be served as fast food in the Caribbean. In Trinidad and Tobago, it is popular as a portable street food, often for lunch. Dhalpuri is the most common dish at Indo-Trinidadian weddings as it is considered complex and delicate to prepare. Dhalpuri is also common in Guyana, where the culture has strong Indian influence.

Dholl puri is considered a national dish of Mauritius. It is served by small shops across the country, and it costs around 14 Mauritian rupees (GB£0.30), as of 2018 (equivalent to £0.49 in 2025). Street vendors sell it as breakfast, lunch, or a light evening meal. At the busiest times of day, many street vendors in the city of Port Louis sell the dish twice per minute. Some Mauritians purchase dholl puri to take home and serve with homemade dishes. Dholl puri is also served at Hindu Mauritian weddings, with fish, goat, or deer meat.

Indo-Caribbean migrants sell dhalpuri in cities beyond the Caribbean. Trinidad-born writer Sam Selvon wrote in 1987, "In all my years in England ... I searched all over London for a dhall pourri, and never saw one until one enterprising Trinidadian started up a little cookshop." Roti shops in Toronto also sell the dish. Mauritian emigrants have established shops selling dholl puri in Europe.

== See also ==
- Mauritians of Indian origin
- Indo–Trinidadians and Tobagonians
