= Roti (wrap) =

Wrap-style sandwich

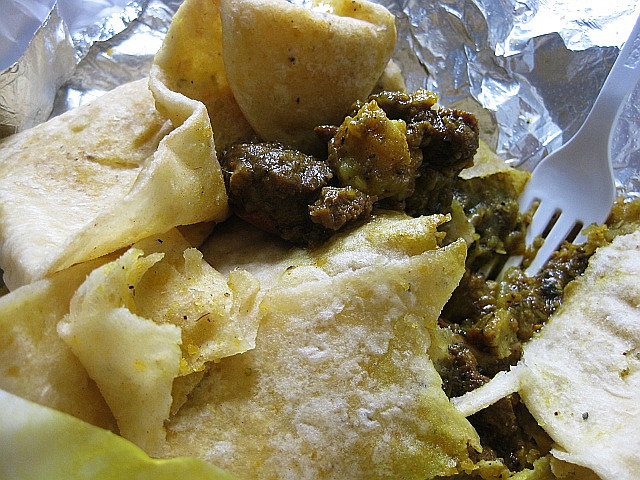
- A roti filled with curried goat and potatoes
- Region or state: Caribbean
- Created by: Sackina Karamath in the mid-1940s in San Fernando, Trinidad and Tobago
- Main ingredients: Curried meats or vegetables wrapped in a paratha, dhalpuri, or dosti roti
- Variations: Goat roti

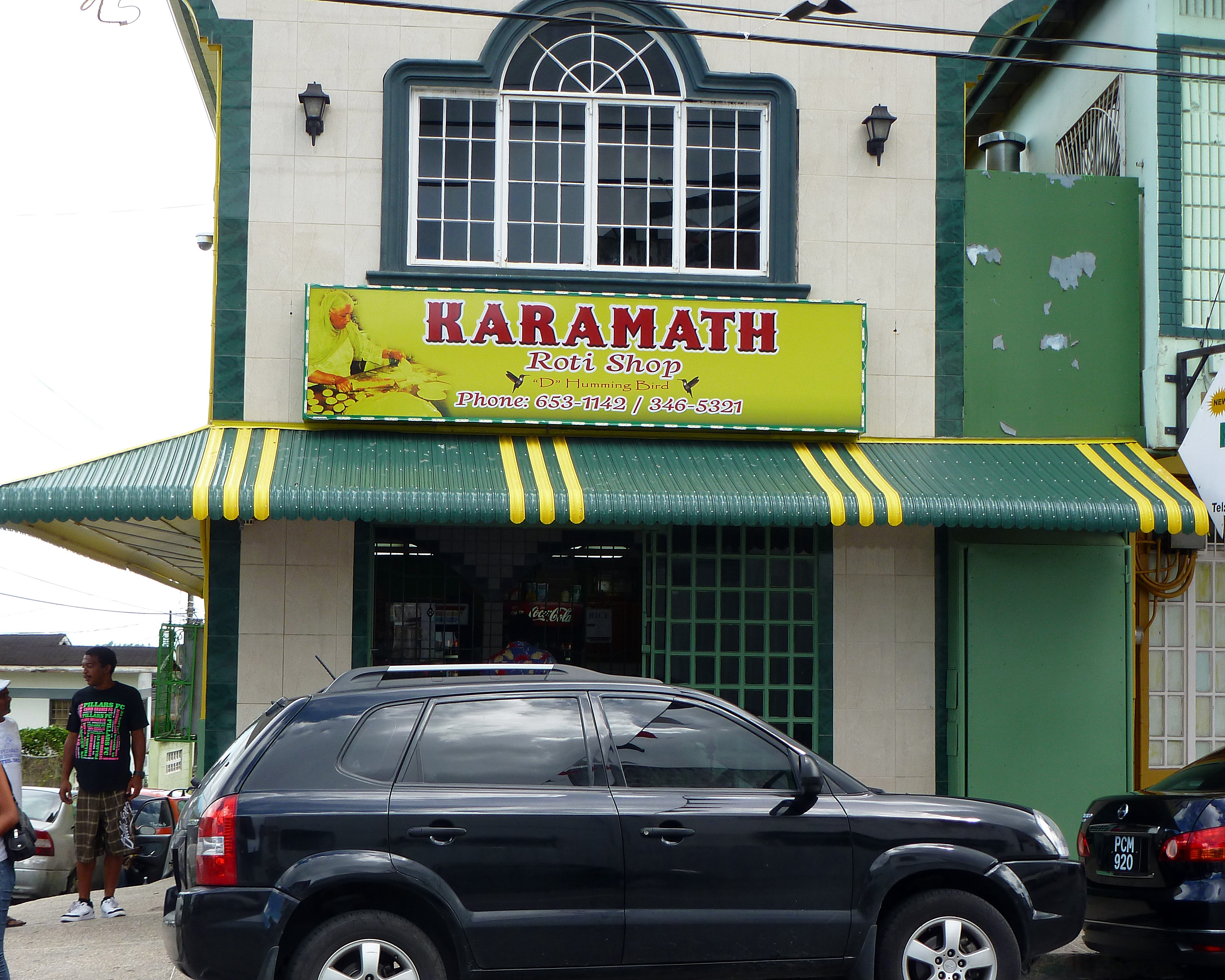
Karamath Roti Shop, also known as D' Humming Bird Roti Shop, at Coffee Street in San Fernando, Trinidad and Tobago, where the roti (wrap) is said to have been invented

Originating in the Caribbean with Indian roots, a roti is a wrap-style sandwich filled with either curried or sometimes stewed meats or vegetables wrapped inside a dhalpuri, paratha, or dosti roti. Roti is eaten widely across the Caribbean. As Indo-Caribbeans immigrated to other countries, especially in North America and Northwestern Europe, they brought with them the roti and opened roti shops to sell it.

== History ==
The roti sandwich is named after the chapati bread (also known as roti) in which it is wrapped. Indian indentured workers came to Trinidad in great numbers after the slavery system ended in 1838. They brought recipes for various roti variations with them that today still are a staple in Trinidadian cuisine as a side dish.

In 1937, a South Trinidadian businessman ran a snack bar in San Fernando. To address takeaway customers he turned the roti, by then used as a side dish, into a wrapping and filled it with curry dishes.

The "invention" spread over Trinidad and subsequently over Guyana, Suriname, and Jamaica. As Trinidadians immigrated to other countries, especially in North America and the United Kingdom, they brought with them the roti and opened roti shops to sell it.

== Preparation ==
Large rotis are baked on tava-style slabs. The filling usually contains a concentrated curry based on any kind of meat or seafood, the most established one being chicken. Additional regular ingredients are potato and/or chickpeas.

Due to a high share of Hindus (at least 18% as of 2011) and a high share of Indo-Trinidadians among the population (at least 35%), vegetarian dishes are popular in Trinidad and Tobago. As a consequence, meatless roti fillings are also common.

== See also ==
- Cuisine of Trinidad and Tobago
- Cuisine of Guyana
- Cuisine of Suriname
- Cuisine of Jamaica
- List of sandwiches
- List of stuffed dishes
- Goat roti
