= Earl Thompson (author) =

American novelist (1931–1978)

- Born: May 24, 1931; Wichita, Kansas
- Died: November 9, 1978 (aged 47); Sausalito, California
- Occupations: American novelist, writer

Earl Thompson (May 24, 1931 – November 9, 1978) was a leading American writer of naturalist prose. Nominated for the National Book Award for A Garden of Sand and chosen by the Book of the Month Club for Tattoo, Thompson died suddenly at the peak of his success, having published just three novels—the fourth, The Devil to Pay, was published posthumously.

== Life and career ==
Thompson was born in Wichita, Kansas in 1931. He served in the U.S. Coast Guard from 1945 to 1946 and in the U.S. Army from 1948 to 1954, serving as a Sergeant First Class, Tank Commander, and First Sergeant. He attended the University of Missouri from 1954 to 1957, and Columbia University in 1959–60.

His first novel A Garden of Sand describes the events of his birth and early childhood in vivid detail. Tattoo picks up where his first novel left off with his protagonist joining the U.S. Navy. Both novels are autobiographical, with the lead character (called Jack MacDeramid in the first and Jack Andersen in the second) a close facsimile of Thompson himself.

Thompson's third novel Caldo Largo was his first to depart from his autobiographical preoccupations, although its main setting—a fishing boat—was one with which Thompson had had first-hand experience.

Thompson lived in Europe for several years, and taught a novelist workshop at the University of California at Berkeley.

Two years after Caldo Largo was published, Thompson died of a heart-attack in Sausalito, California. His fourth and last book, The Devil to Pay, returns to his autobiographical narrative—this time with a nearly identical protagonist called Jarl Carlson ("Jarl" is the Scandinavian form of Earl)—and was published after his death by Thompson's friend and estate executor Gilmer Y. Waggoner. The book is considerably shorter than the dense A Garden of Sand and its counterpart Tattoo, and according to Waggoner, was finished by a ghostwriter.

== Bibliography ==
- A Garden of Sand. New York: G. P. Putnam's Sons, 1970. paperback edition: New York: Carroll & Graf, 1991.
- Tattoo. New York: G. P. Putnam's Sons, 1974. paperback edition: New York: Carroll & Graf, 1991.
- Caldo Largo. New York: G. P. Putnam's Son's, 1976. first paperback edition, Signet Books 1977. subsequent paperback edition: New York: Carroll & Graf, 1991.
- The Devil to Pay. New York: New American Library, 1982.
