= Champaran meat =

Meat dish from Bihar, India

Champaran Meat
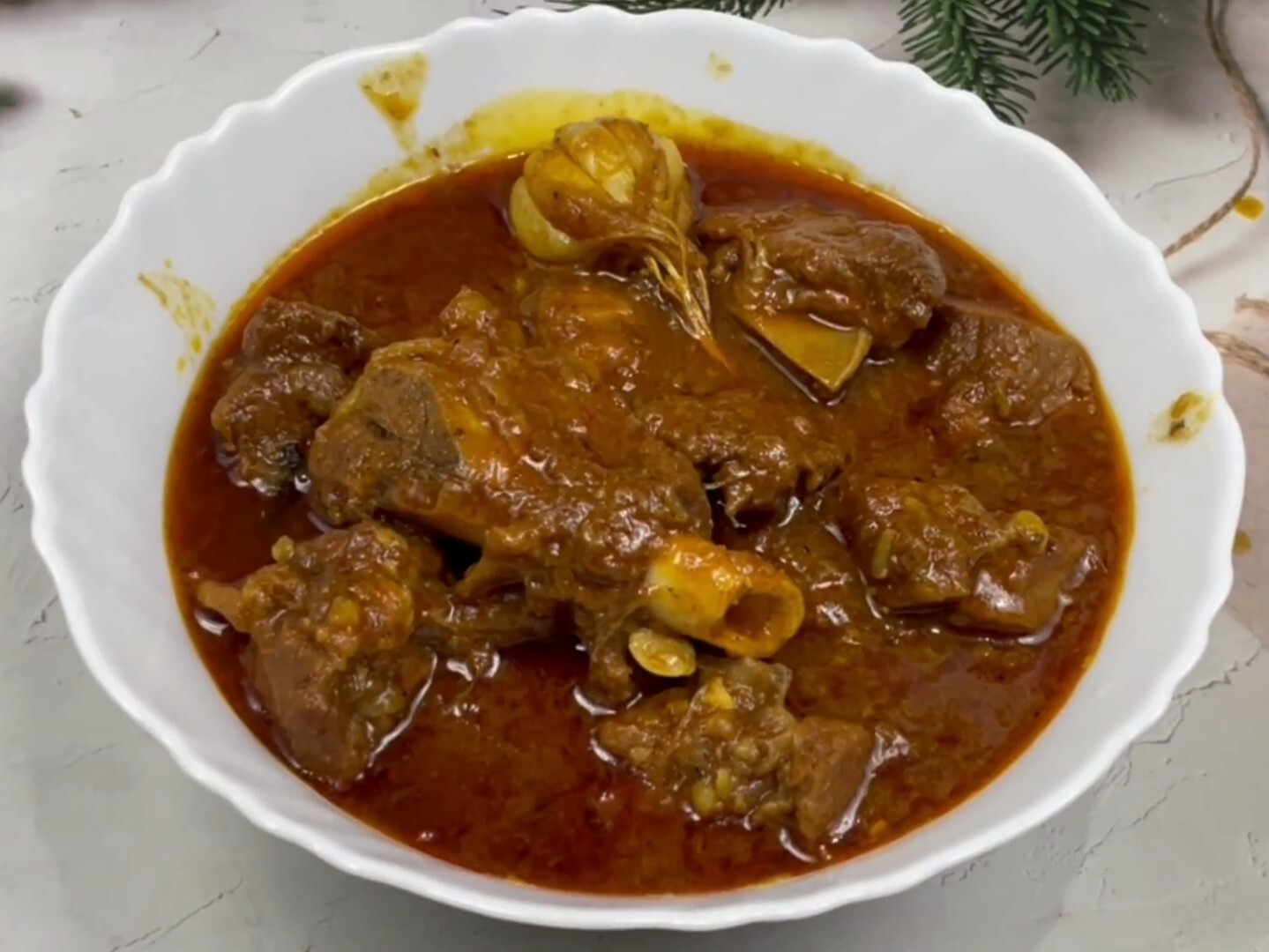
- Handi Meat
- Alternative names: Ahuna, Handi Meat, Batlohi
- Course: Main dish
- Place of origin: Champaran, Bihar
- Region or state: Bhojpuri region
- Associated cuisine: Bhojpuri cuisine
- Serving temperature: Hot
- Main ingredients: Chicken, Mutton, Indian Spices
- Ingredients generally used: Ghee, Mustard oil, Curd, Onions, Ginger, Dried fruit
- Variations: Many
- Similar dishes: Mutton Curry, Chicken Curry

Champaran meat, also known as ahuna, handi meat or batlohi, is a dish with its root from the Champaran region of Bihar. Meat is marinated in a mix of mustard oil and ghee, garlic, onions and ginger with the paste of spices. The mouth of the handi (earthenware pot) is sealed with kneaded flour. It is cooked slowly on a low flame of a wood fire and tossed continuously while cooking. The taste and cooking time depend on the quality of meat. Champaran Mutton has become popular in various cities like Bangalore, Delhi, Mumbai, Kolkata and Pune.
