= List of cuisines of the Americas =

This is a list of cuisines of the Americas. A cuisine is a characteristic style of cooking practices and traditions, often associated with a specific culture. The cuisines found across North and South America are based on the cuisines of the countries from which the immigrant peoples came, primarily Europe. However, traditional European cuisine has been adapted with the addition of local ingredients, and many techniques have been added to the tradition as well.

== North American cuisine ==
- North American cuisine

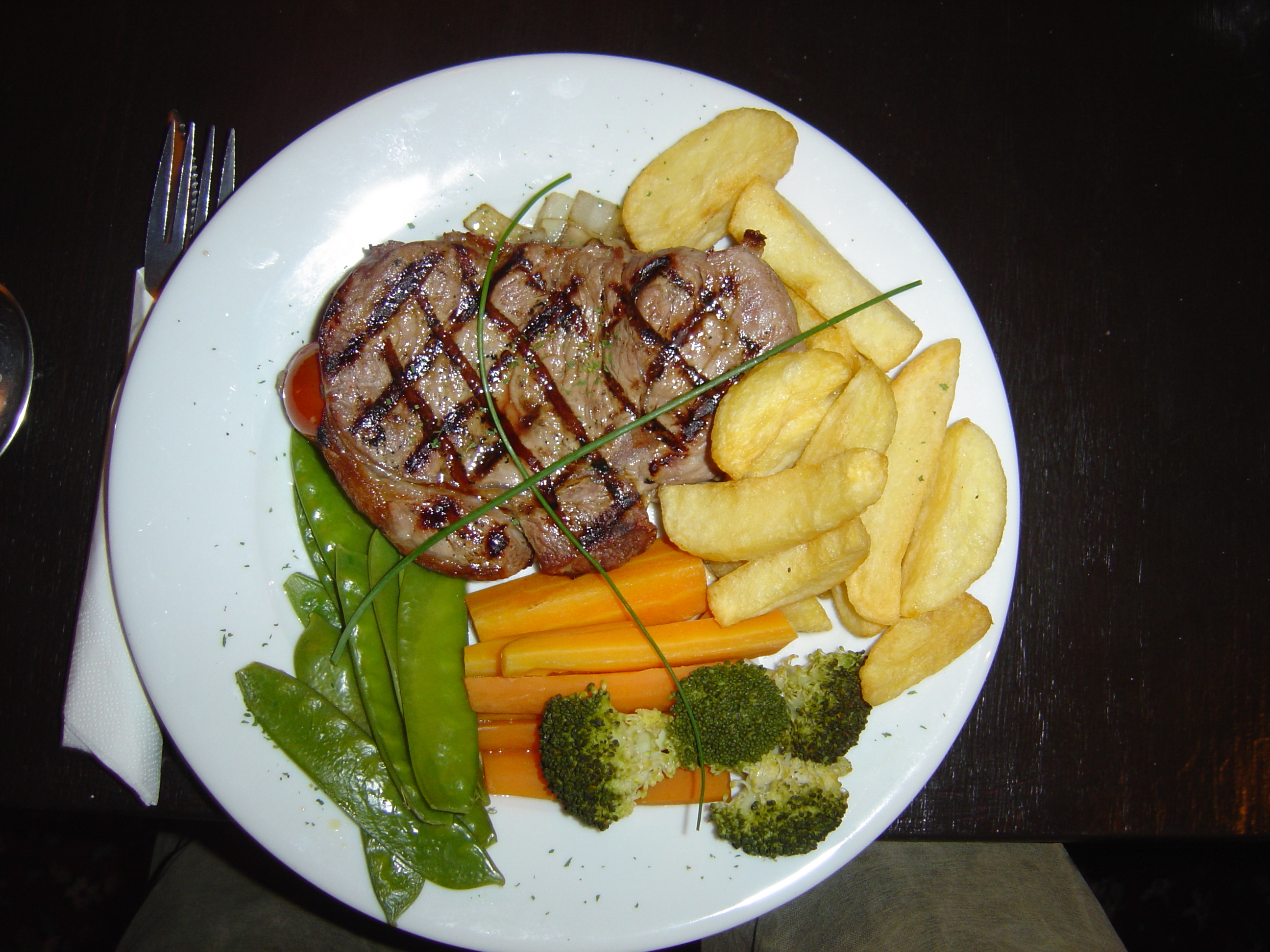
A sirloin steak dinner

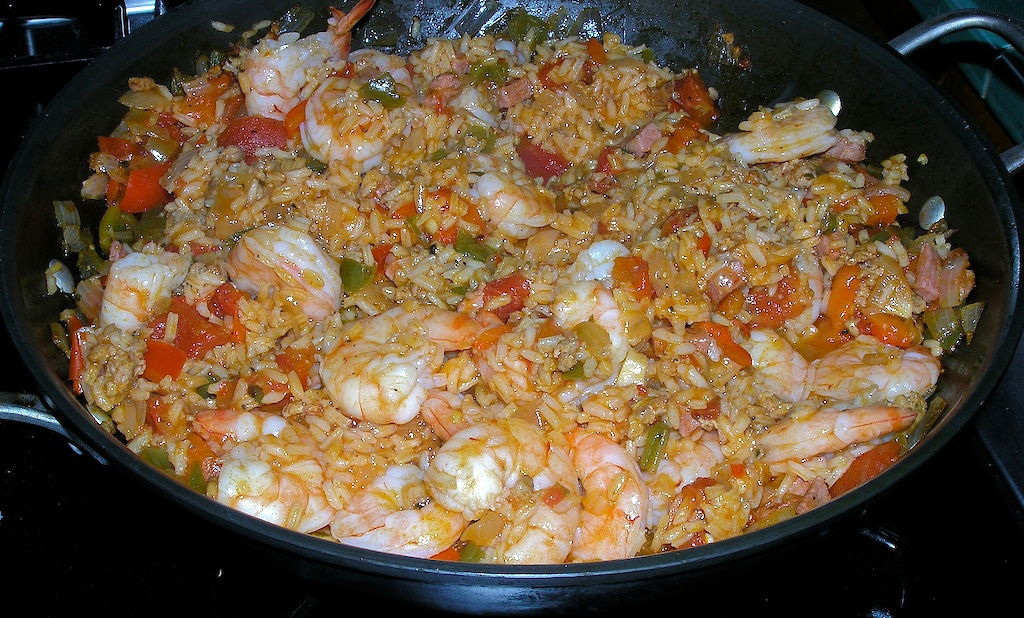
Creole jambalaya with shrimp, ham, tomato, and andouille sausage

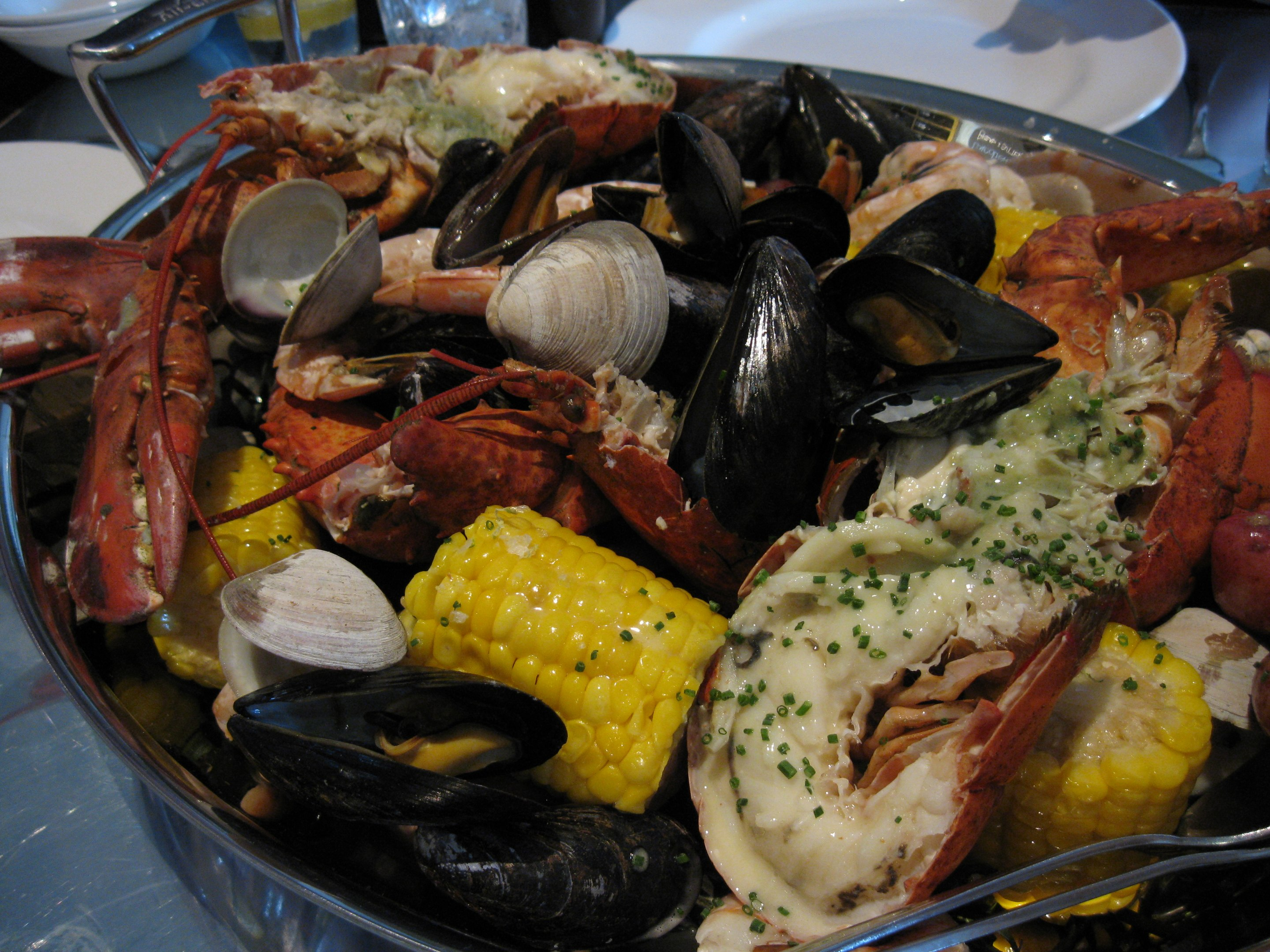
A New England clam bake

- American cuisine (U.S.) is cuisine from the United States. The cuisine's history dates back from before the colonial period with the Native Americans, who used diverse cooking styles and ingredients. During the European colonization period, the cooking techniques used changed and new ingredients were introduced from Europe. The cuisine continued to expand and diversify into the 19th and 20th centuries with the influx of immigrants from various nations across the world. This influx has created unique regional cuisines throughout the country. In addition to cookery, cheese and wine play an important role in the cuisine. The wine industry is regulated by American Viticultural Areas (AVA) (regulated appellation), similar to laws found in countries such as France and Italy.

- Midwestern American cuisines is a regional cuisine of the American Midwest. It draws its culinary roots most significantly from the cuisines of Central, Northern and Eastern Europe, and is influenced by regionally and locally grown foodstuffs and cultural diversity.

- Cuisine of Chicago
- Cuisine of North Dakota
- Cuisine of Omaha
- Cuisine of St. Louis

- Northeastern American cuisines

- Cuisine of New England comprises Northeastern U.S. cuisine, including the six states of Connecticut, Maine, Massachusetts, New Hampshire, Rhode Island, and Vermont. The American Indians' cuisine became part of the cookery style that the early colonists brought with them.
- Cuisine of Philadelphia
- Cuisine of New Jersey
- Cuisine of New York City comprises many cuisines belonging to various ethnic groups that have entered the United States through the city. Almost all ethnic cuisines are available in New York City, both in and out of their various ethnic neighborhoods.

- Cuisine of the Mid-Atlantic United States

- Cuisine of Pittsburgh

- Southern American cuisines are defined as the historical regional culinary form of states generally south of the Mason–Dixon line dividing Pennsylvania from Maryland and Delaware as well as along the Ohio River, and extending west to Texas. See also Soul food and Cuisine of Kentucky.

- Cajun cuisine
- Floribbean cuisine
- Louisiana Creole cuisine is a style of cooking originating in Louisiana that blends French, Spanish, Portuguese, Italian, Greek, Asian Indian, Native American, African, and general Southern cuisine.
- Lowcountry cuisine
- Cuisine of Kentucky
- Cuisine of New Orleans

- Southwestern American cuisine is food styled after the rustic cooking of the Southwestern United States. It comprises a fusion of recipes for things that might have been eaten by Spanish colonial settlers, cowboys, Native Americans, and Mexicans throughout the post-Columbian era. there is, however, a great diversity in this type of cuisine throughout the Southwestern states.

- New Mexican cuisine
- Texan cuisine
- Tex-Mex cuisine

- Western American cuisine can be distinct in various ways compared to the rest of the U.S. Those states west of Texas, Kansas, Missouri, and Nebraska would be considered part of this area, as would, in some cases, western parts of adjoining states. The concept of obtaining foods locally is increasingly influential, as is the concept of sustainability. The influence of the Native American cultures of each area, but especially in the Northwest and in Navajo country, is important in the cuisine picture of the Western United States.

- California cuisine is a style of cuisine marked by an interest in fusion (integrating disparate cooking styles and ingredients) and in the use of freshly prepared local ingredients. See also: Cuisine of California.
- Cuisine of California
- Hawaiian cuisine in modern times is a fusion of many cuisines brought by multiethnic immigrants to the Hawaiian Islands, particularly of American, Chinese, Filipino, Japanese, Korean, Polynesian and Portuguese origins, including plant and animal food sources imported from around the world for agricultural use in Hawaii. Many local restaurants serve the ubiquitous plate lunch featuring the Asian staple, two scoops of rice, a simplified version of American macaroni salad (consisting of macaroni and mayonnaise), and a variety of different toppings ranging from the hamburger patty, a fried egg, and gravy of a loco moco, Japanese style tonkatsu or the traditional lu'au favorite, kalua pig.
- Pacific Northwest cuisine is a North American cuisine of the states of Oregon, Washington and Alaska, and the provinces of British Columbia and the southern Yukon. The cuisine reflects the ethnic makeup of the region, with noticeable influence from Asian and Native American traditions.
- Rocky Mountain cuisine

- Fusion cuisine

- Chinese American cuisine
- Greek-American cuisine
- Italian-American cuisine
- Euro-Asian cuisine
- New American cuisine
- Pizza in the United States

- Other

- Fast food
- Barbecue
- Native American cuisine
- Cuisine of the Pennsylvania Dutch
- Puerto Rican cuisine
- Roadkill cuisine
- Soul food
- Tailgate party
- Tlingit cuisine
- United States military ration

- Regional foods and cuisines

- California-style pizza
- Carne asada fries
- Chicago-style hot dog
- Chicago-style pizza
- Cincinnati chili
- Coney Island hot dog
- Fish fry
- Hot dog variations (U.S.)
- Italian beef
- Kansas City-style barbecue
- Lobster roll
- Lowcountry cuisine, traditionally associated with the South Carolina Lowcountry and the Georgia coast
- Pig roast, pig pickin'
- Mission burrito
- Maine lobster
- Manhattan clam chowder
- New England boiled dinner
- New England clam bake
- New England clam chowder
- New York-style pizza
- Philadelphia cheesesteak
- Santa Maria-style barbecue
- St. Louis-style barbecue
- St. Louis-style pizza
- White hot

Additional U.S. foods and dishes

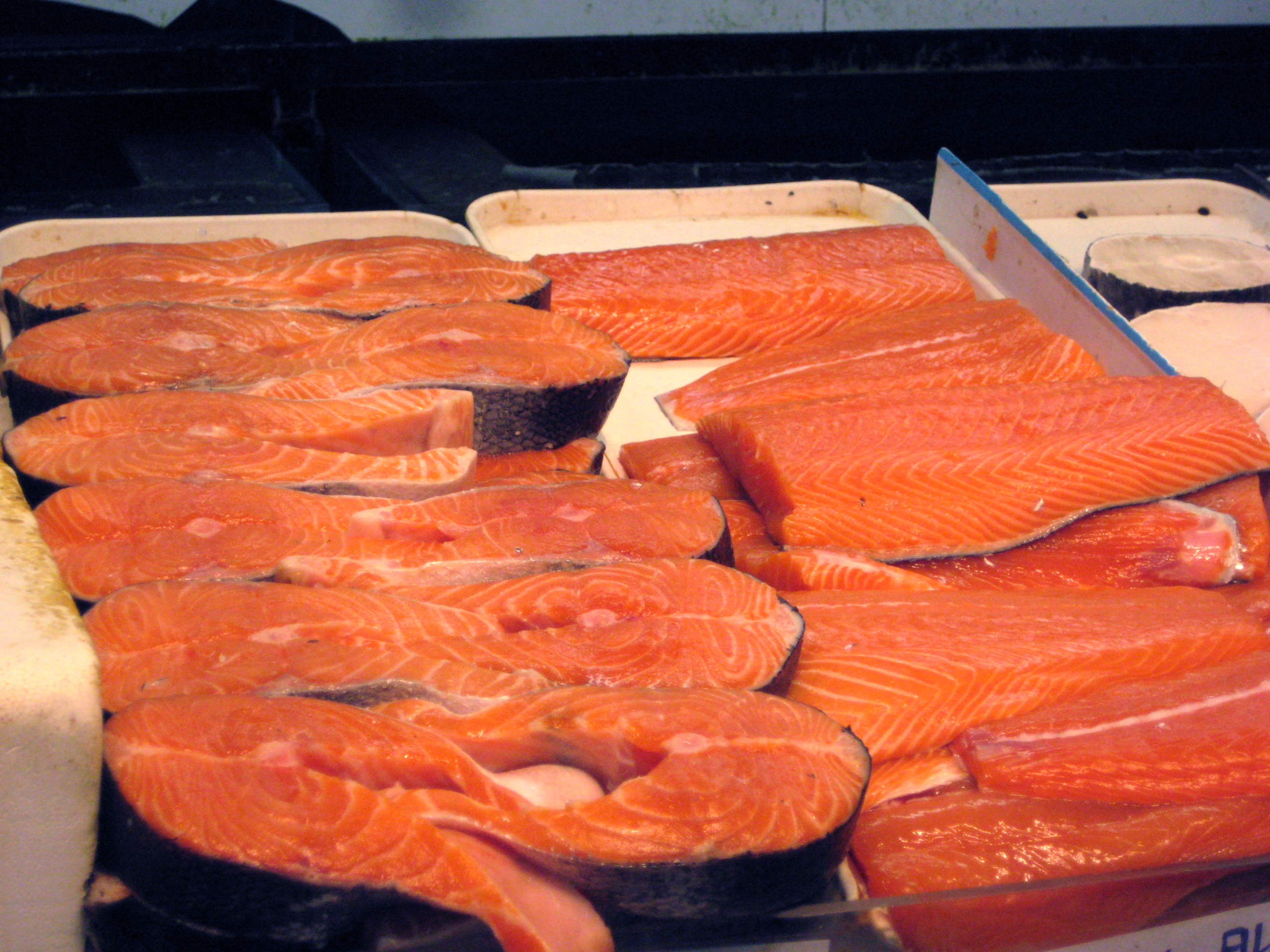
Salmon is widely available in the Pacific Northwest.

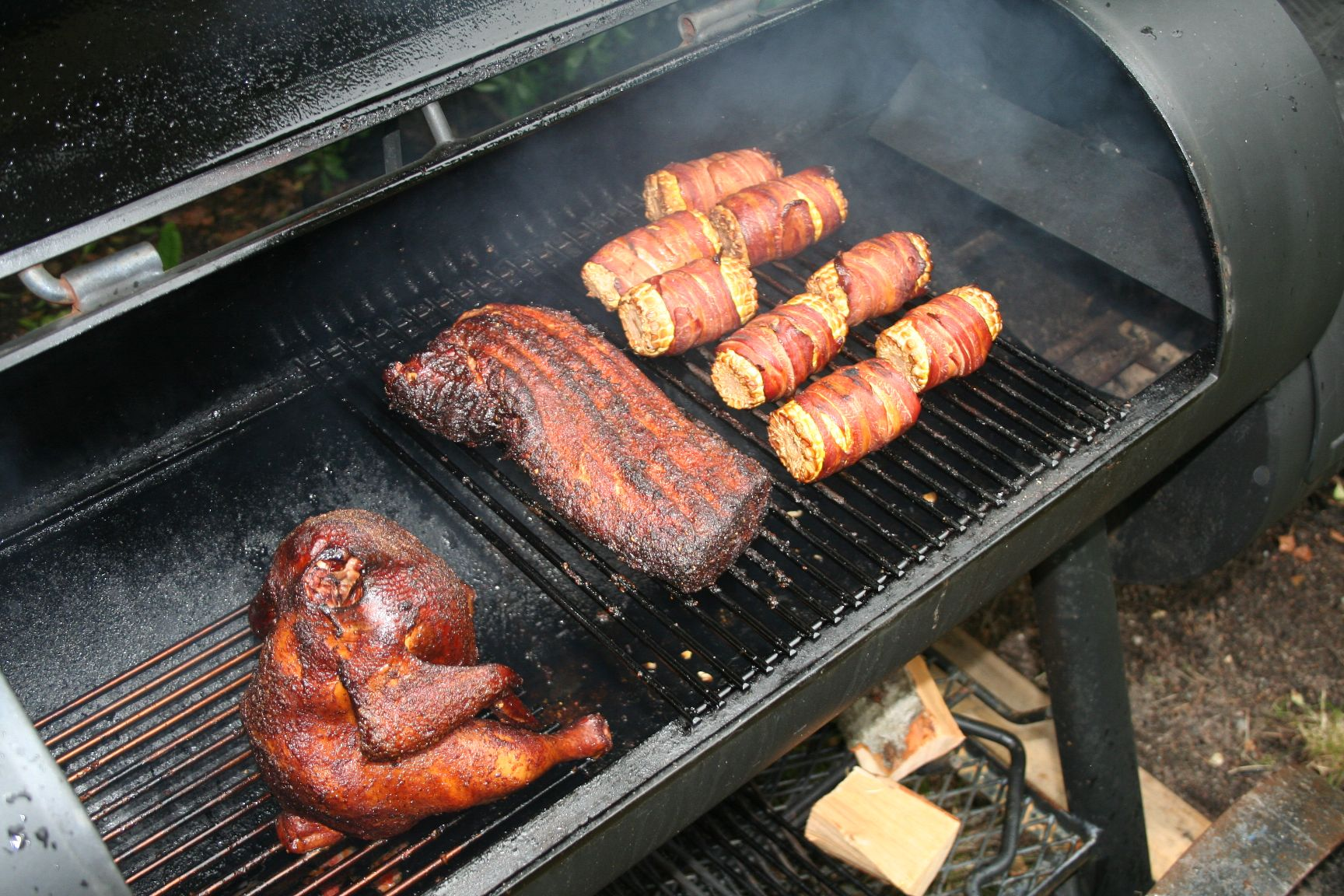
Chicken, pork and corn cooking in a barbecue smoker

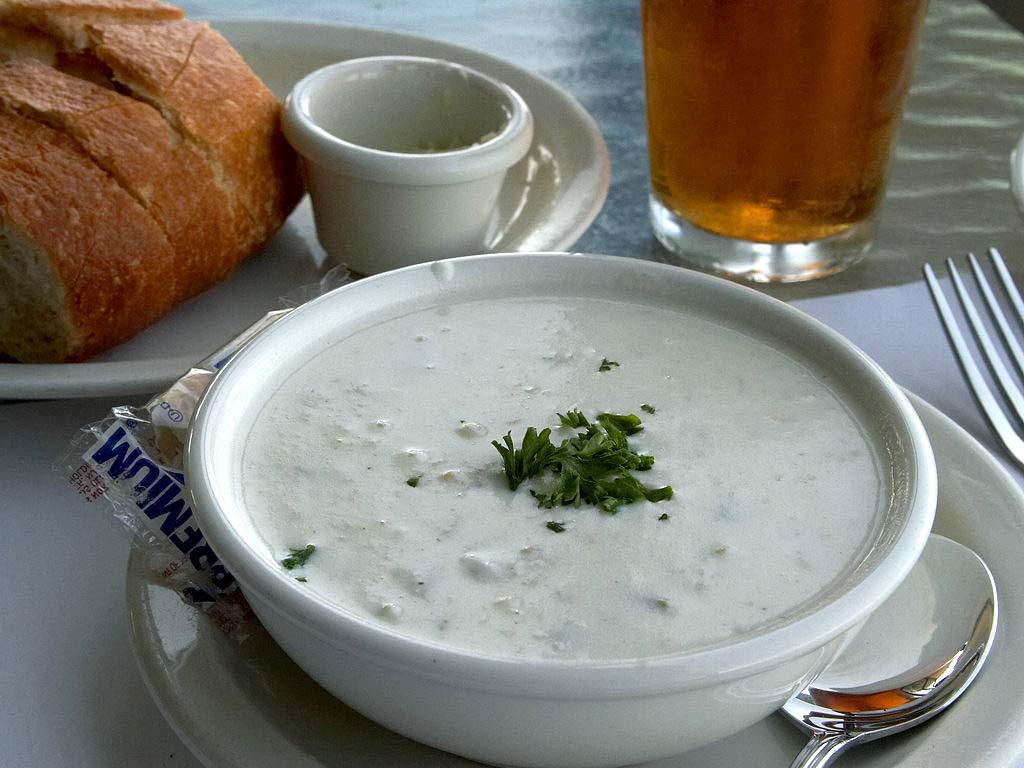
New England clam chowder

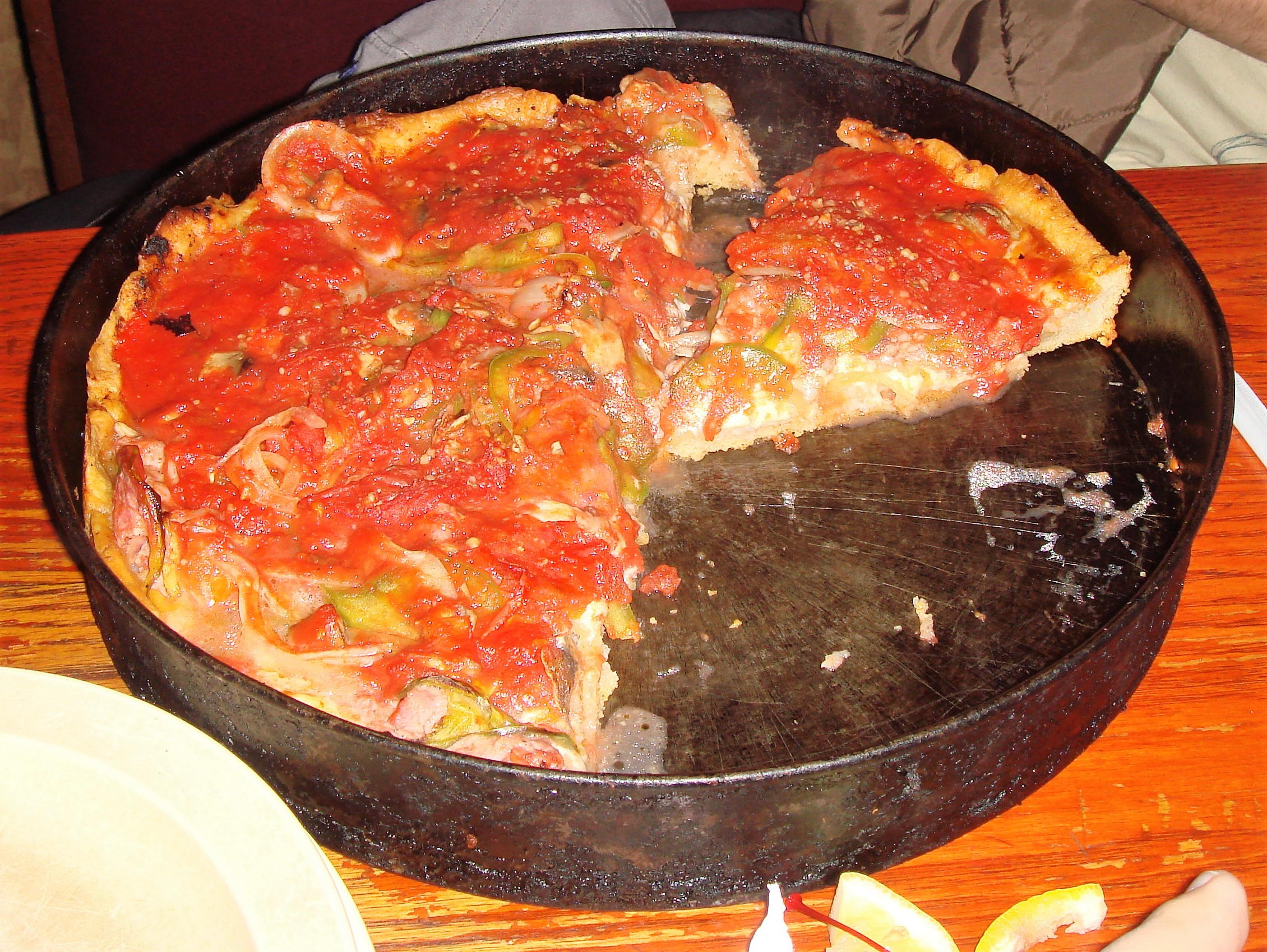
Chicago-style deep-dish pizza from the original Pizzeria Uno location

- Bermudian cuisine
- Canadian cuisine varies widely from depending on the regions of the country. The former Canadian prime minister Joe Clark has been paraphrased to have noted, "Canada has a cuisine of cuisines. Not a stew pot, but a smorgasbord ('open sandwich' in Swedish)." The traditional cuisine of English Canada related to British cuisine while the traditional cuisine of French Canada has evolved from 16th-century French cuisine and the winter provisions for the fur traders. Waves of immigration in the 19th, 20th and 21st centuries from Central Europe, Southern Europe, Eastern Europe and Asia affected the cuisines of different regions. Common contenders as the Canadian national food include poutine and butter tarts. The province of Quebec is the world's largest producer of maple syrup. The sugar maple's leaf is depicted on the country's flag.

Canadian foods and dishes

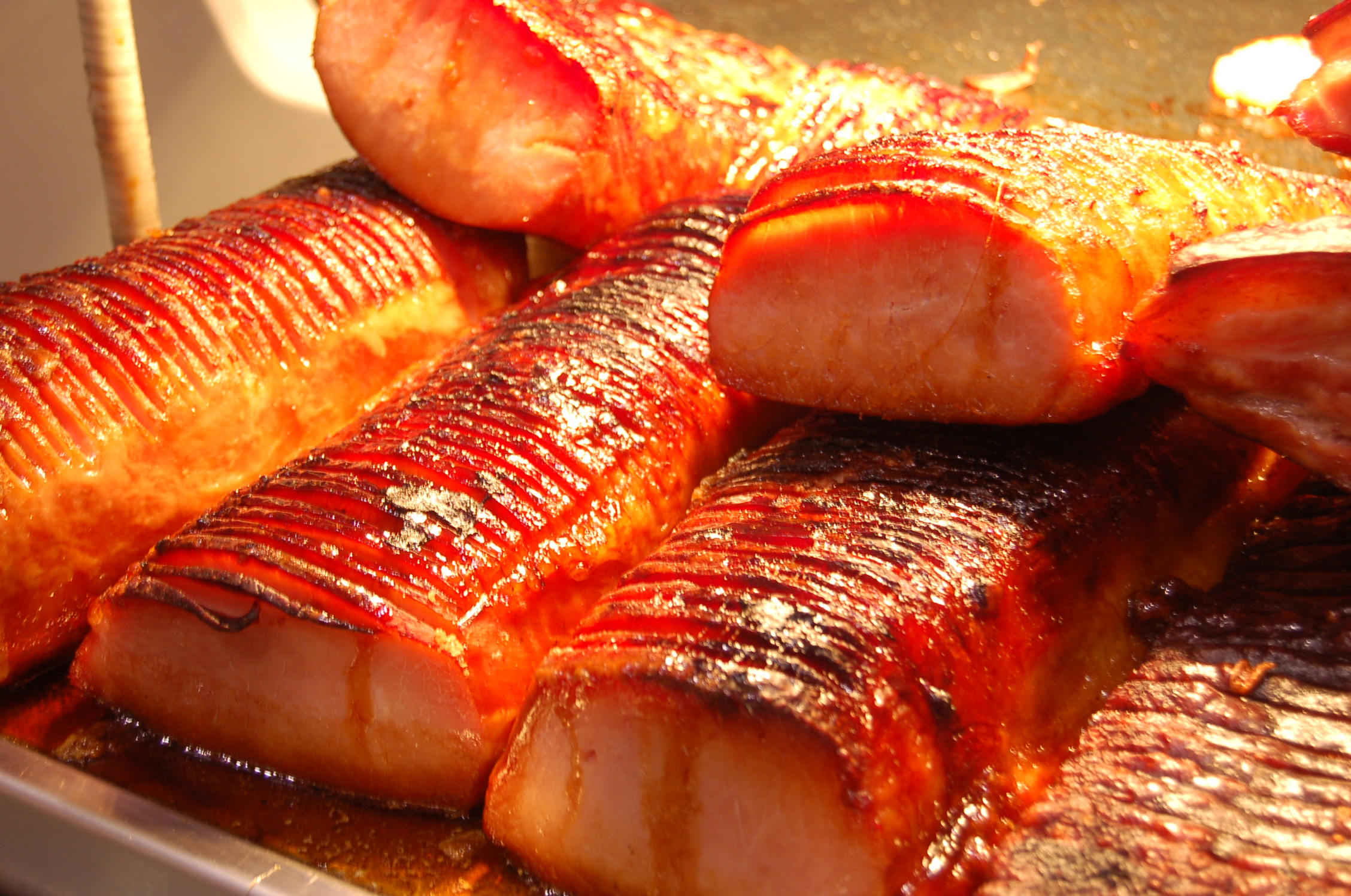
Canadian bacon, or peameal bacon, prepared from center-cut boneless pork loin

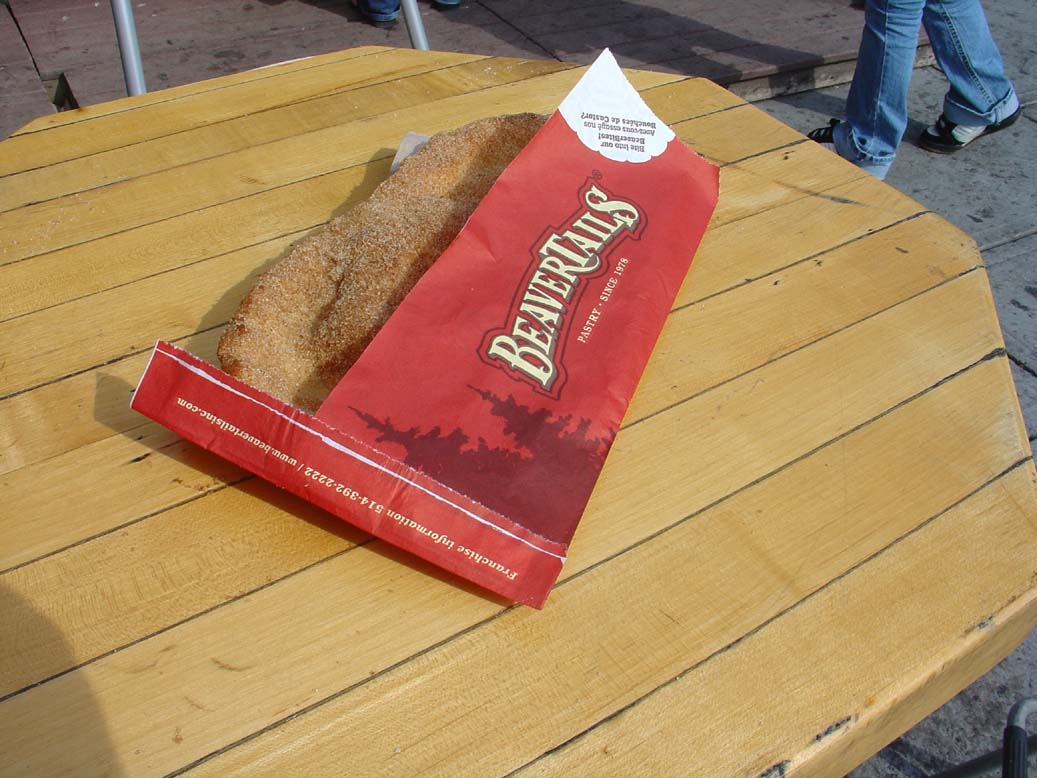
Beavertail, a fried dough pastry from Quebec resembling the tail of a beaver, a Canadian symbol

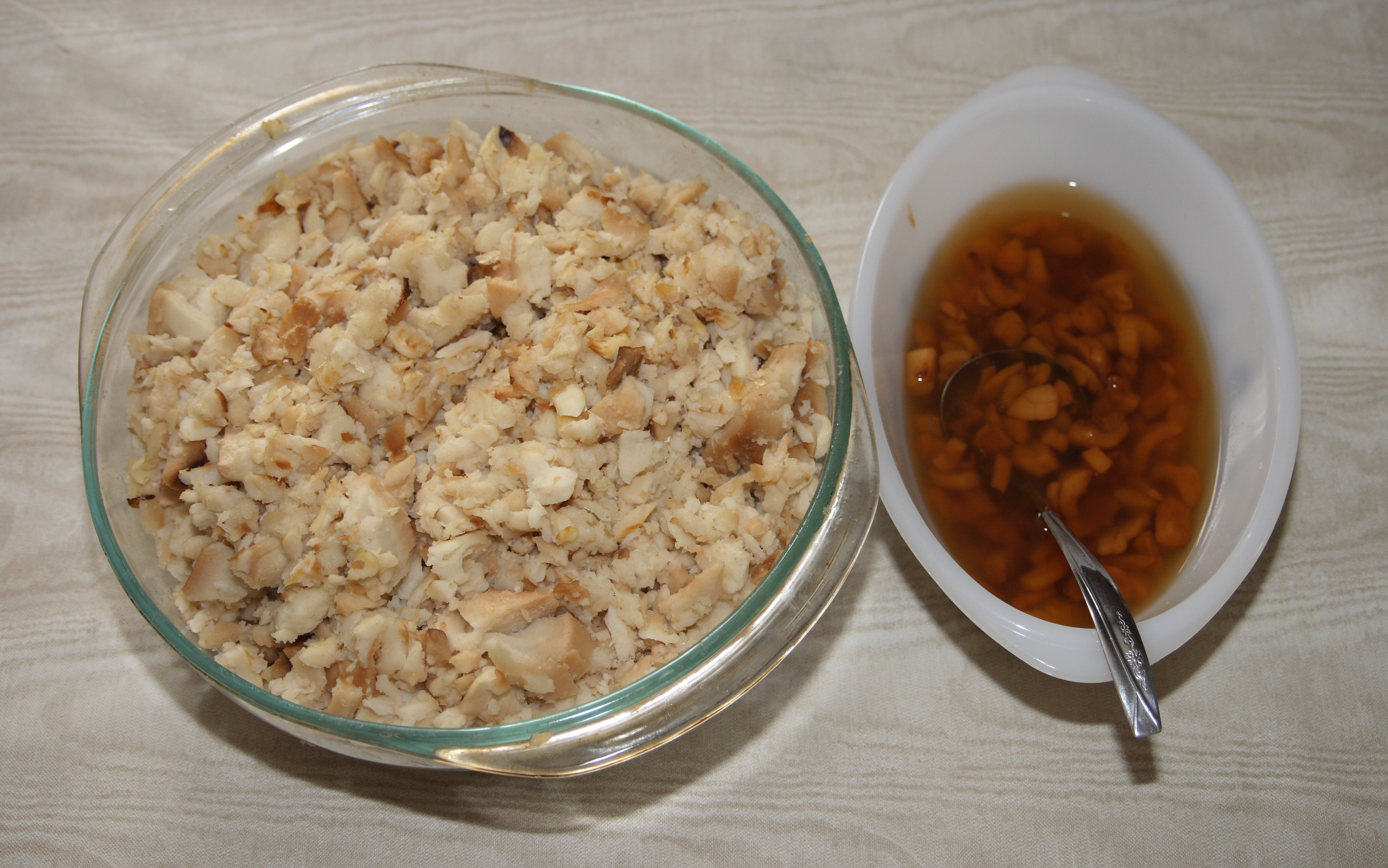
Fish and brewis with scrunchions, a traditional Newfoundland meal consisting of codfish and hard bread or hard tack

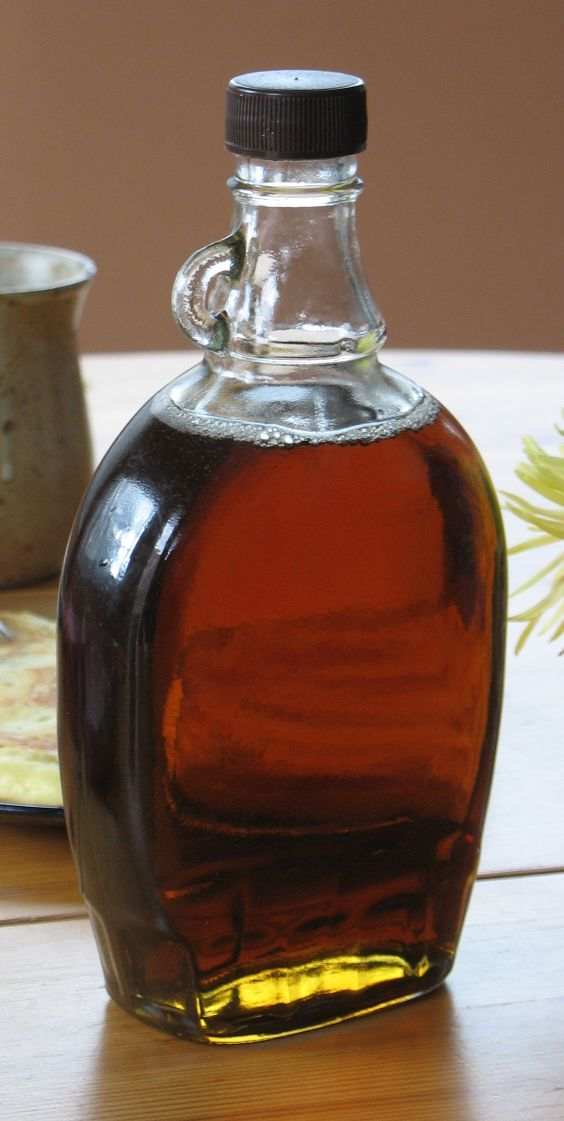
A bottle of maple syrup from Quebec, Canada

- Cuisine of Quebec – Quebec is home to many unique dishes and products. Its most famous are its tourtières (meat pies), pea soup, baked beans, cretons, ham dishes, maple, Pouding chômeur and "tire Ste-Catherine" (St. Catherine's taffy).

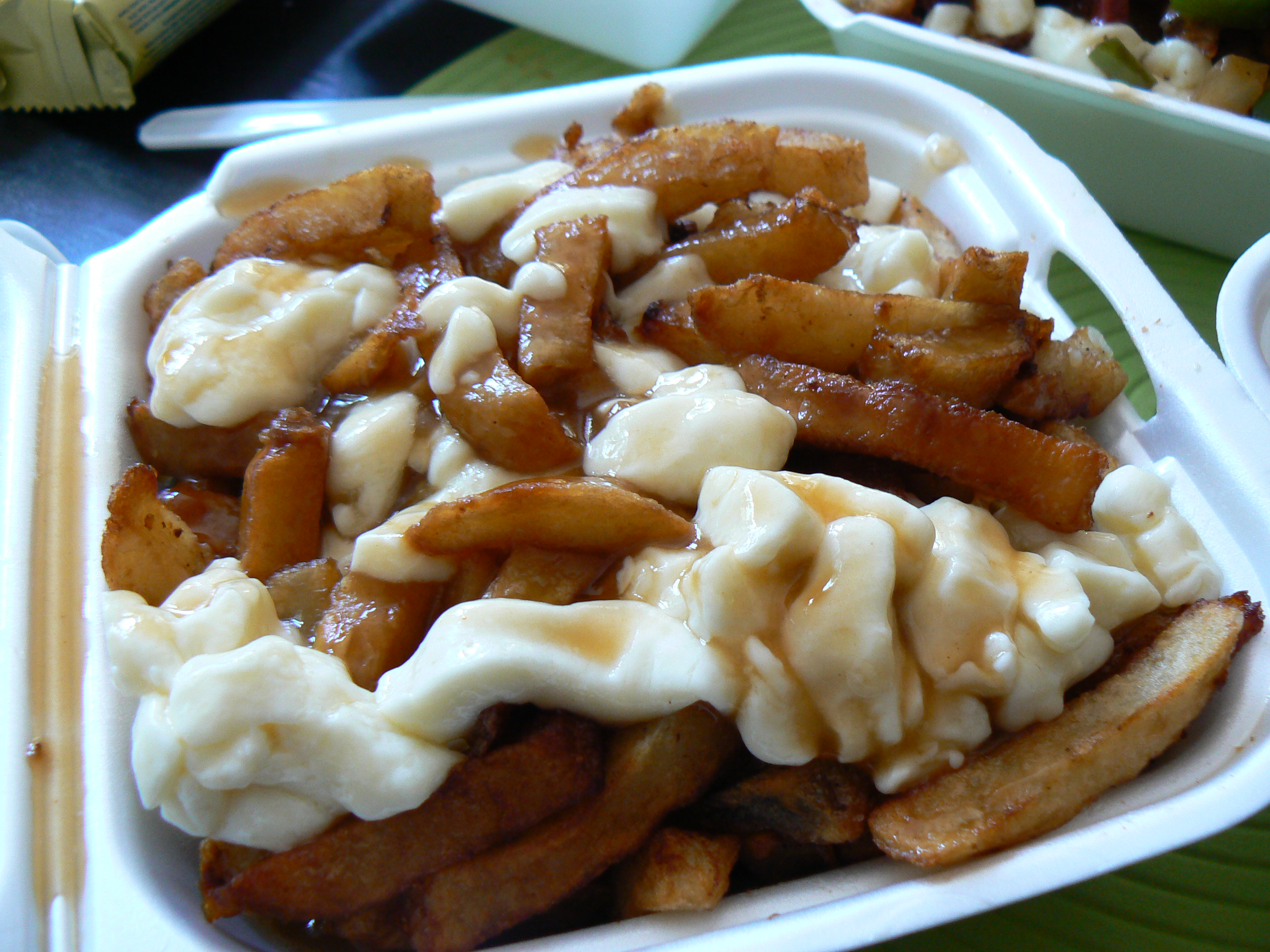
Québécois poutine is made with french fries, curds and gravy.

- Cuisine of the Maritime Provinces – the Maritimes region of Canada has some unique foods from the Acadians, First Nations and English settlers groups. Many of these dishes use seafood and/or vegetables that were easy to preserve during the winter.
- Cuisine of Toronto – Toronto's is a large city with significant multicultural diversity due to recent immigration. As such, cuisines from around the world can be found there. Different ethnic neighborhoods throughout the city focus on specific cuisines.
- Some of Canada's regional foods:

- Fish and brewis
- Flipper pie
- Jiggs dinner
- Montreal-style bagel
- Montreal-style smoked meat
- Nanaimo bar
- Oka cheese
- Oreilles de crisse
- Poutine
- Sushi pizza
- Toutin
- Yellow pea soup.

- Greenlandic cuisine

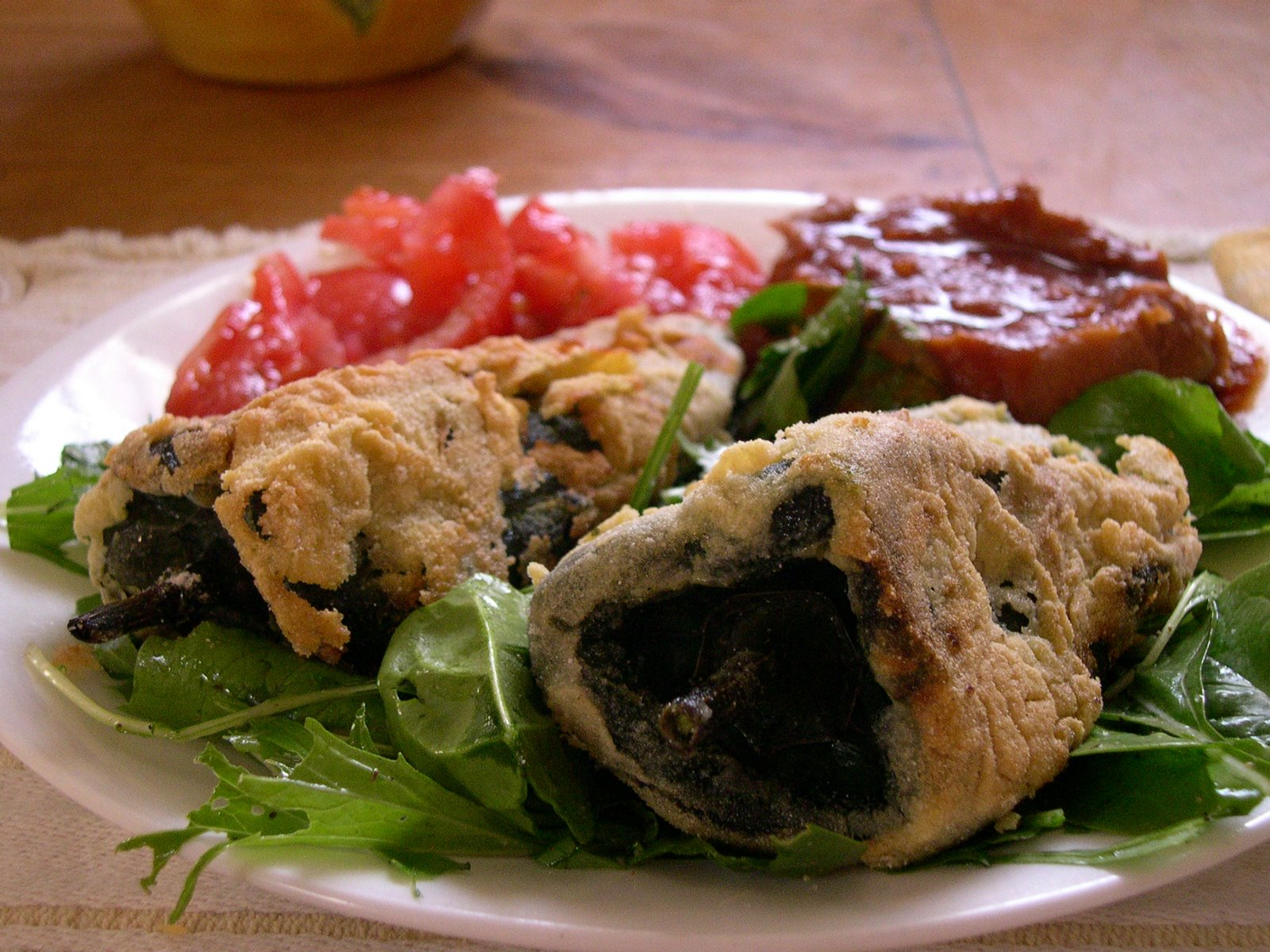
A traditional chile relleno stuffed with jack cheese and breaded with corn masa flour. This is a Mexican dish that originated in the city of Puebla.

- Mexican cuisine – Mexican food varies by region because of Mexico's large size and diversity, different climates and geography, ethnic differences among the indigenous inhabitants and because different populations were influenced by the Spaniards in varying degrees. The north of Mexico is known for its beef, goat and ostrich production and meat dishes, in particular the well-known arrachera cut. The food staples of Mexican cuisine are typically corn and beans. Corn is used to make masa, a dough for tamales, tortillas, gorditas, and many other corn-based foods. Corn is also eaten fresh, as corn on the cob and as a component of a number of dishes. Squash and chili peppers also prominent in Mexican cuisine. Honey is an important ingredient in many Mexican dishes, such as the rosca de miel, a bundt-like cake, and in beverages such as balché. Mexican cuisine was added by UNESCO to its lists of the world's "Intangible Cultural Heritage of Humanity".

- By region

Mexico's six regions differ greatly in their cuisines. In the Yucatán, achiote seasoning is commonly used, which is a sweet red sauce with a slight peppery flavor, made from seeds of the tropical annatto plant and sour orange. In contrast, the Oaxacan region is known for its savory tamales, moles, and simple tlayudas, while the mountainous regions of the West (Jalisco, etc.) are known for goat birria (goat in a spicy tomato-based sauce).

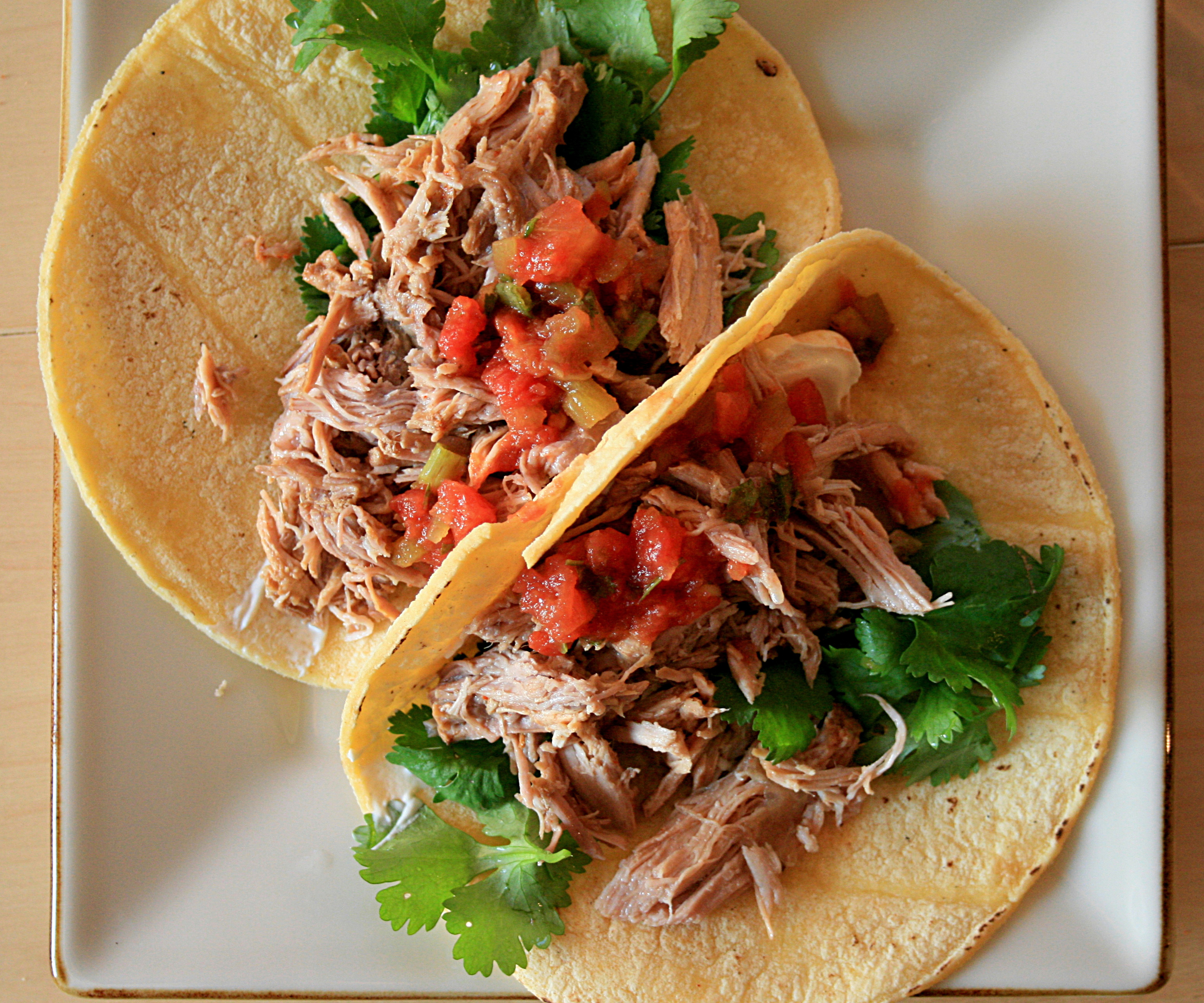
Tacos made with carnitas filling

Central Mexico's cuisine is influenced by the rest of the country, and also has unique dishes such as barbacoa, pozole, menudo and carnitas.

Southeastern Mexico is known for its spicy vegetable and chicken-based dishes. The cuisine of Southeastern Mexico has a considerable Caribbean influence due to its location. Seafood is commonly prepared in states that border the Pacific Ocean or the Gulf of Mexico, the latter having a famous reputation for its fish dishes, à la veracruzana.

In pueblos or villages, there are also more exotic dishes, cooked in the Aztec or Mayan style (known as comida prehispánica) with ingredients ranging from iguana to rattlesnake, deer, spider monkey, chapulines, ant eggs, and other kinds of insects.

More recently, Baja Med cuisine has developed in Tijuana and elsewhere in Baja California, combining Mexican with Mediterranean flavors.

Recently other cuisines of the world have acquired popularity in Mexico, thus adopting a Mexican fusion. For example, sushi in Mexico is often made with a variety of sauces based on mango or tamarind, and very often served with serrano-chili-blended soy sauce, or complemented with habanero and chipotle peppers.

- Regional foods

- Carne asada, thin or thick pieces of meat, usually beef, that is often marinated and served whole or chopped
- Chipotle, a smoke-dried jalapeño chili pepper
- Chocolate: The word chocolate originated in Mexico's Aztec cuisine, derived from the Nahuatl word xocolatl. Chocolate was first drunk rather than eaten. In the past, the Maya civilization grew cacao trees and used the cacao seeds it produced to make a frothy, bitter drink. The drink, called xocoatl, was often flavored with vanilla, chili pepper, and achiote (also known as annatto). Chocolate was also historically used as a form of currency. Today chocolate is used in a wide array of Mexican foods, from savory dishes such as mole to traditional Mexican style hot chocolate and champurrados, both of which are prepared with a molinillo.

Additional Mexican foods and dishes

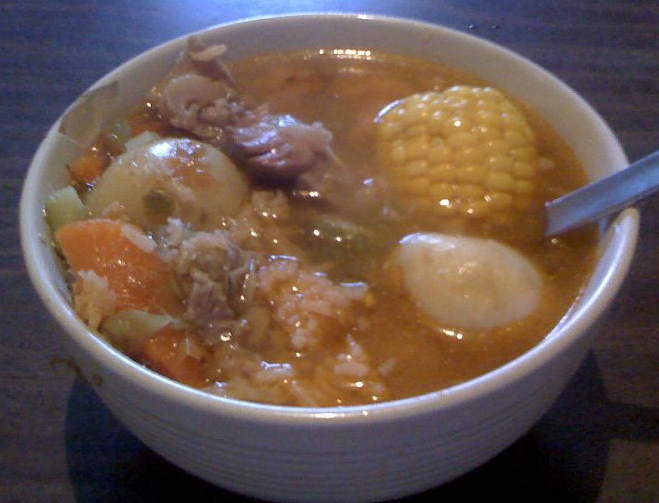
Caldo de res is a Mexican dish made with corn, green beans, potatoes, carrots, cabbage and cilantro.

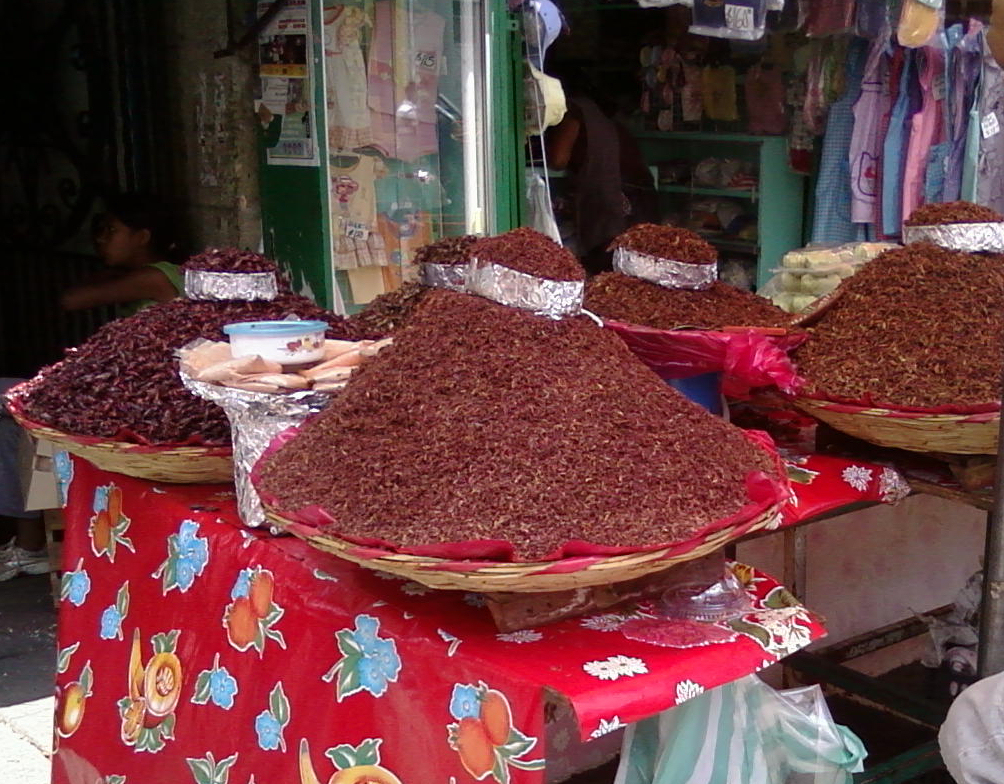
Chapulines, (roasted grasshoppers), for sale in Oaxaca, Mexico

- Mexican wine

== Caribbean cuisine ==
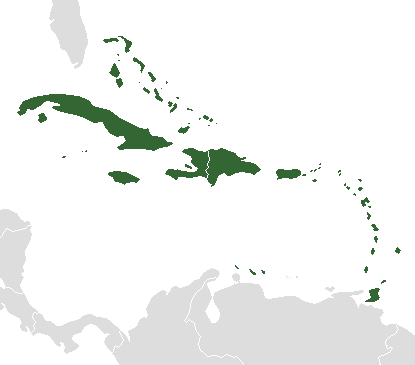

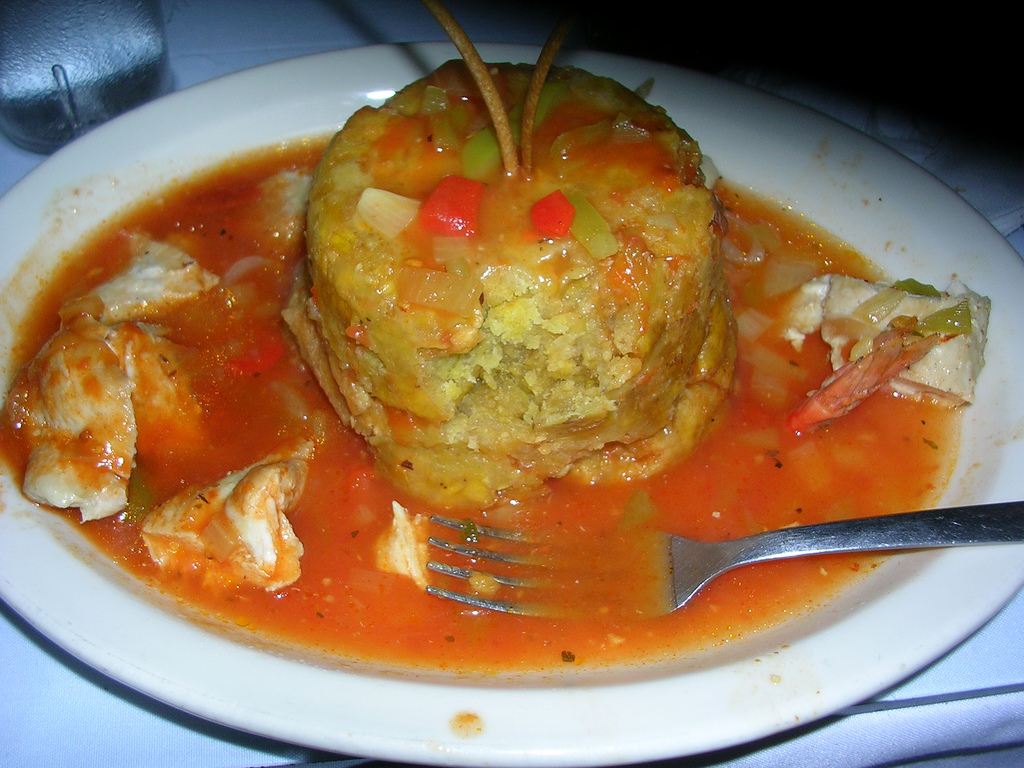
Mofongo is a Puerto Rican dish made with plantains.

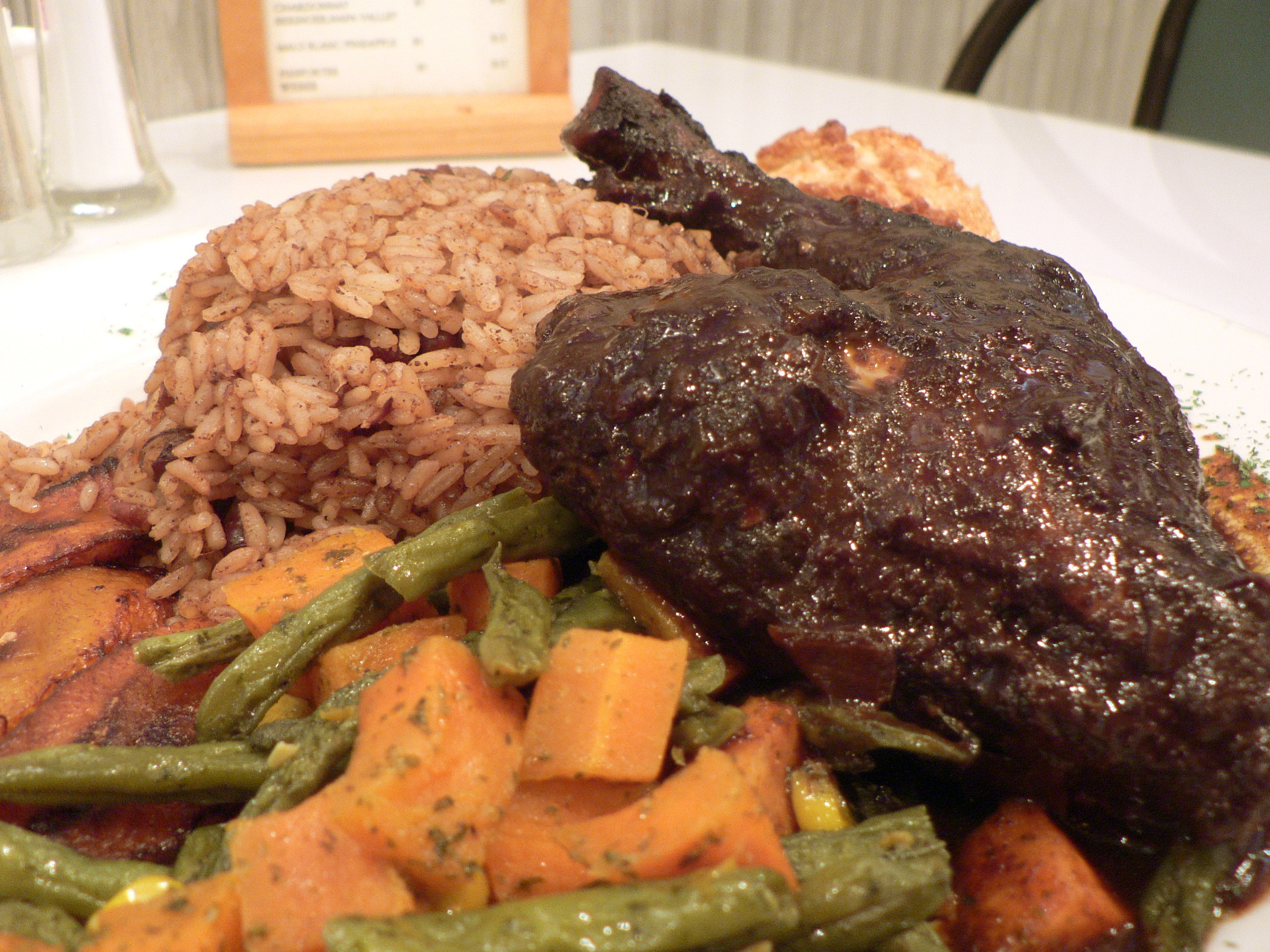
Jamaican jerk spice chicken, rice, plantain and a honey biscuit

- As there is no one homogeneous Caribbean, there is also no one Caribbean cuisine, but one based on European historical grouping and colonization. There are two broad based or types of cuisines in the Caribbean area. One is based around Western European colonized groupings such as British, French, Dutch and the other Spanish-based like in Central America and most of South America, or Latin based. Both incorporate a European influence (s) together with an Indigenous (Mayan, Aztec or Amerindian), and a West African influence as a base.

The dishes made in the previously British and French Islands and territories in the Caribbean are much more diverse than the islands colonized by Spanish due to a history of changing colonial administration or ownership (between British, French, Dutch and Spanish), and the migration of diverse groups brought to work on plantations including Indians from Indian, Chinese and Portuguese (Madeira and Azores).

There is even much diversity within each previous colonial groupings. While both Trinidad and Jamaica were both British colonies and share similar cooking styles, the scope of dishes in Trinidad are different and more diverse due to a very different population make up. The similarities in the larger region lie mostly in the fruits and vegetables consumed and the ingredients used in cooking, with the use of root vegetables, plantains, beans, and rice, fish and seafood being a common denominator. In the post independence and post colonial era, and with globalization in the 1990s cultural and food similarities between the previous British, still French and Dutch Island and territories were magnified.

- Anguillan cuisine
- Antigua and Barbuda cuisine
- Aruban cuisine
- Bahamian cuisine
- Barbadian cuisine
- British Virgin Islands cuisine
- Cayman Islands cuisine
- Cuban cuisine

- Cuban sandwich

- Cuisine of Curaçao
- Dominican cuisine
- Dominican Republic cuisine
- Grenadian cuisine
- Guadeloupe cuisine
- Haitian cuisine
- Jamaican cuisine

- List of Jamaican dishes and foods
- Ackee
- Jamaican jerk spice

- Martinican cuisine
- Montserrat cuisine
- Puerto Rican cuisine
- St. Kitts and Nevis cuisine
- Saint Lucian cuisine
- Saint Vincent cuisine
- Trinidad and Tobago cuisine
- Turks and Caicos cuisine
- US Virgin Islands cuisine

- Regional foods

- Black cake, a derivative of English Christmas pudding, is served in some areas, especially on special occasions.
- Callaloo
- Rice and peas
- Scotch bonnet pepper

Caribbean foods and dishes

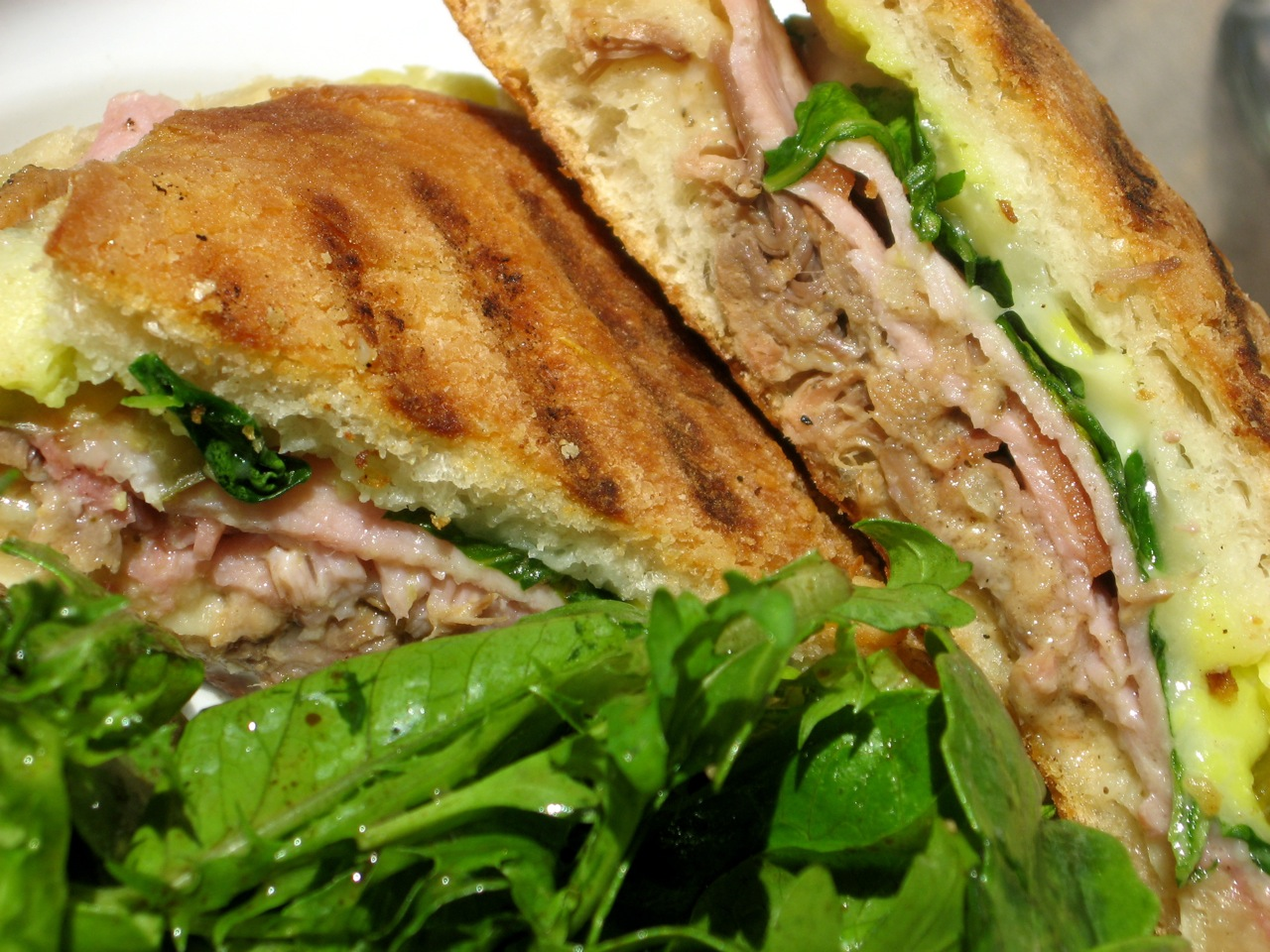
Medianoche is a Cuban sandwich consisting of roast pork, ham, mustard, Swiss cheese, and sweet pickles on soft, sweet egg dough bread.

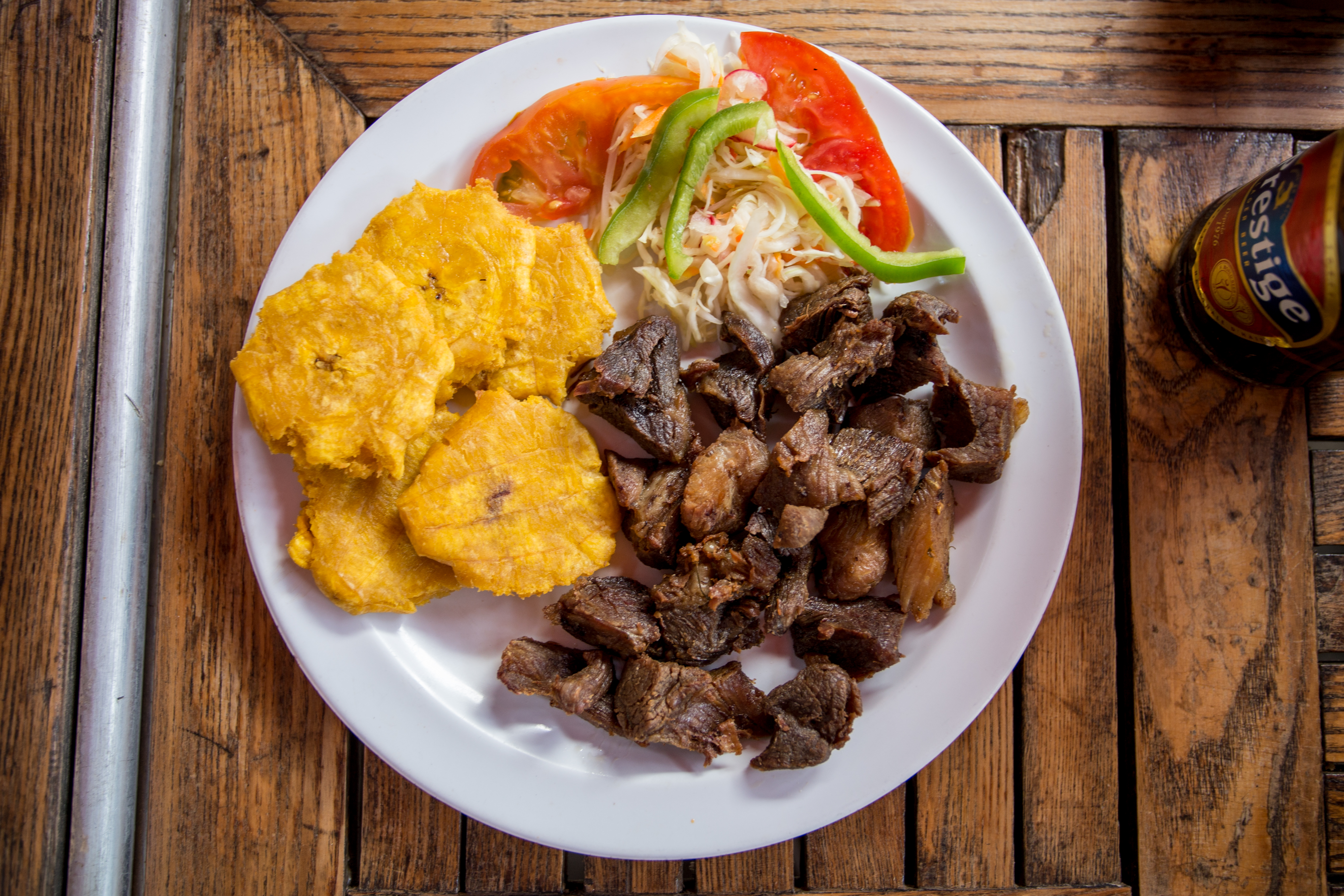
Griot is a Haitian dish of pork shoulder marinated in citrus before being braised and fried.

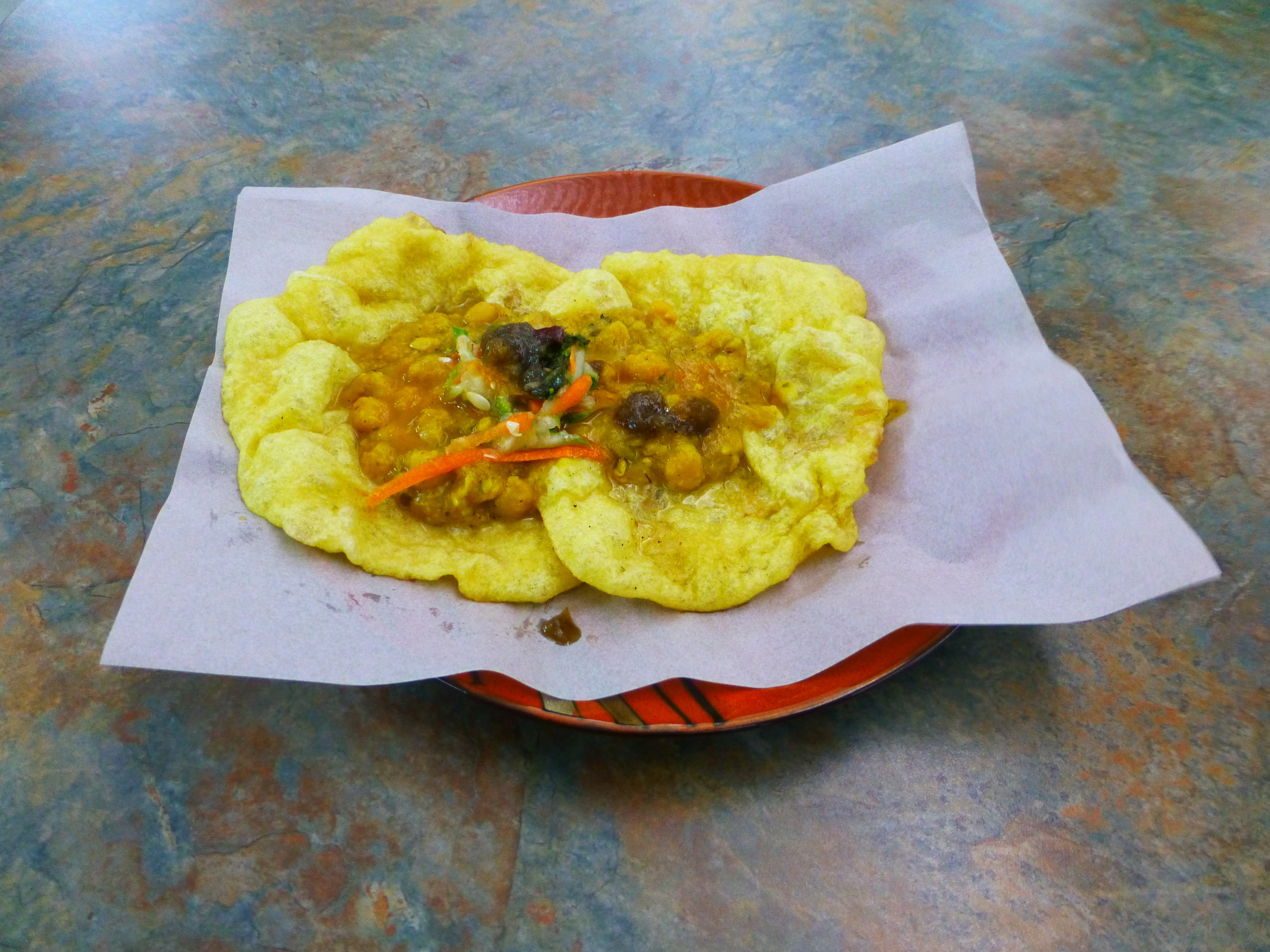
Doubles is a common Trinidadian and Tobagian street food made with two baras filled with curried chickpeas and various chutneys.

== Central American cuisine ==

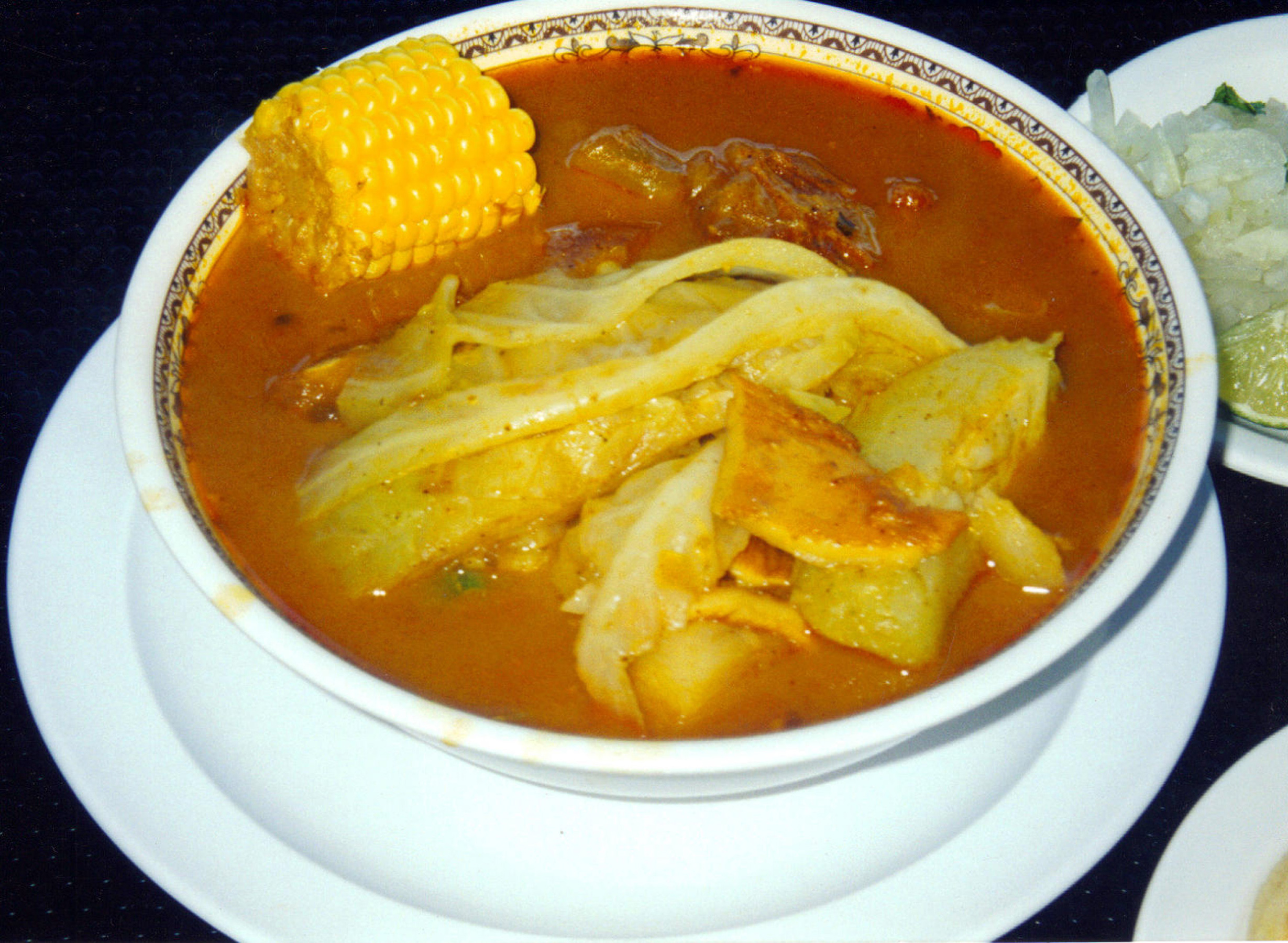
Sopa de pata is a popular soup in El Salvador made from cow tripe, plantain, corn, tomatoes, cabbage and spices.

- Central American cuisine – some typical foods in Central American cuisine include maize-based dishes, tortillas, tamales, pupusas, various salsas and other condiments, such as guacamole, pico de gallo, mole, chimichurri and pebre.

- Belizean cuisine is an amalgamation of all the ethnicities in the nation of Belize, and their respective wide variety of foods. Culinary influences include Mayan, Garifuna, Spanish, Creole, Chinese, British, Caribbean, and American.
- Costa Rican cuisine – a common dish is gallo pinto, which is rice and black beans. Tortillas, plantains, fish, beef and chicken are part of the cuisine. Casado is a traditional dish comprising meat served with tortillas and side items such as black beans and rice, or gallo pinto. Refrescos in Costa Rica refers to cold fruit smoothie beverages made with fruit and milk or water.
- Guatemalan cuisine was influenced by the Mayan Empire, Spanish rule and the current modernized country. Guatemala has 22 departments (or divisions), each of which has varying food varieties.
- Honduran cuisine is a fusion of African, Spanish, and indigenous cuisine. Coconut is used in both sweet and savory dishes. Regional specialties include fried fish, tamales, carne asada and baleadas. Common dishes include grilled meats, tortillas, rice and beans. Seafood is common in the Bay Islands and on the Caribbean coast.
- Nicaraguan cuisine is a mixture of Spanish, Creole, Garifuna and indigenous cuisines and foods. When the Spaniards first arrived in Nicaragua they found that the Creole people present had incorporated foods available in the area into their cuisine. Despite the blending and incorporation of pre-Columbian and Spanish influenced cuisine, traditional cuisine changes from the Pacific to the Caribbean coast. While the Pacific coast's main staple revolves around local fruits and corn, the Caribbean coast's cuisine makes use of seafood and the coconut. Traditional Nicaraguan foods include beans, corn, plantains, peppers and yucca.
- Panamanian cuisine is both unique and rich. As a land bridge between two continents, Panama possesses an unusual variety of tropical fruits, vegetables and herbs that are used in native cooking. Panamanian cuisine is a unique mix of African, Caribbean, Spanish and Native American cooking and dishes.
- Salvadoran cuisine consists of food from the Maya, Lenca, and Pipil people. The cuisine is also influenced by Spanish cuisine. Empanadas, tamales and pupusas are widespread, and seafood is common because of San Salvador's extensive coastline.

- Regional foods

The sweet potato is native to Central America and was domesticated there at least 5,000 years ago.

Central American foods and dishes

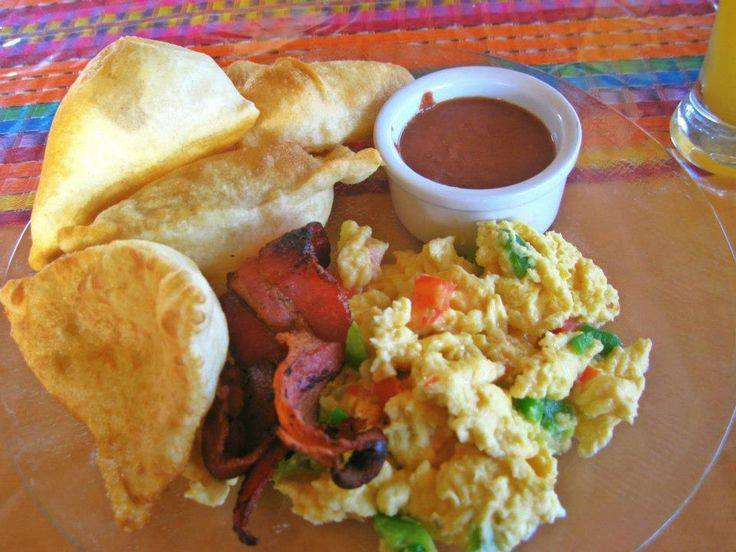
Fry jacks are Belizean deep-fried dough pieces served for breakfast, and can be shaped as circles or triangles.

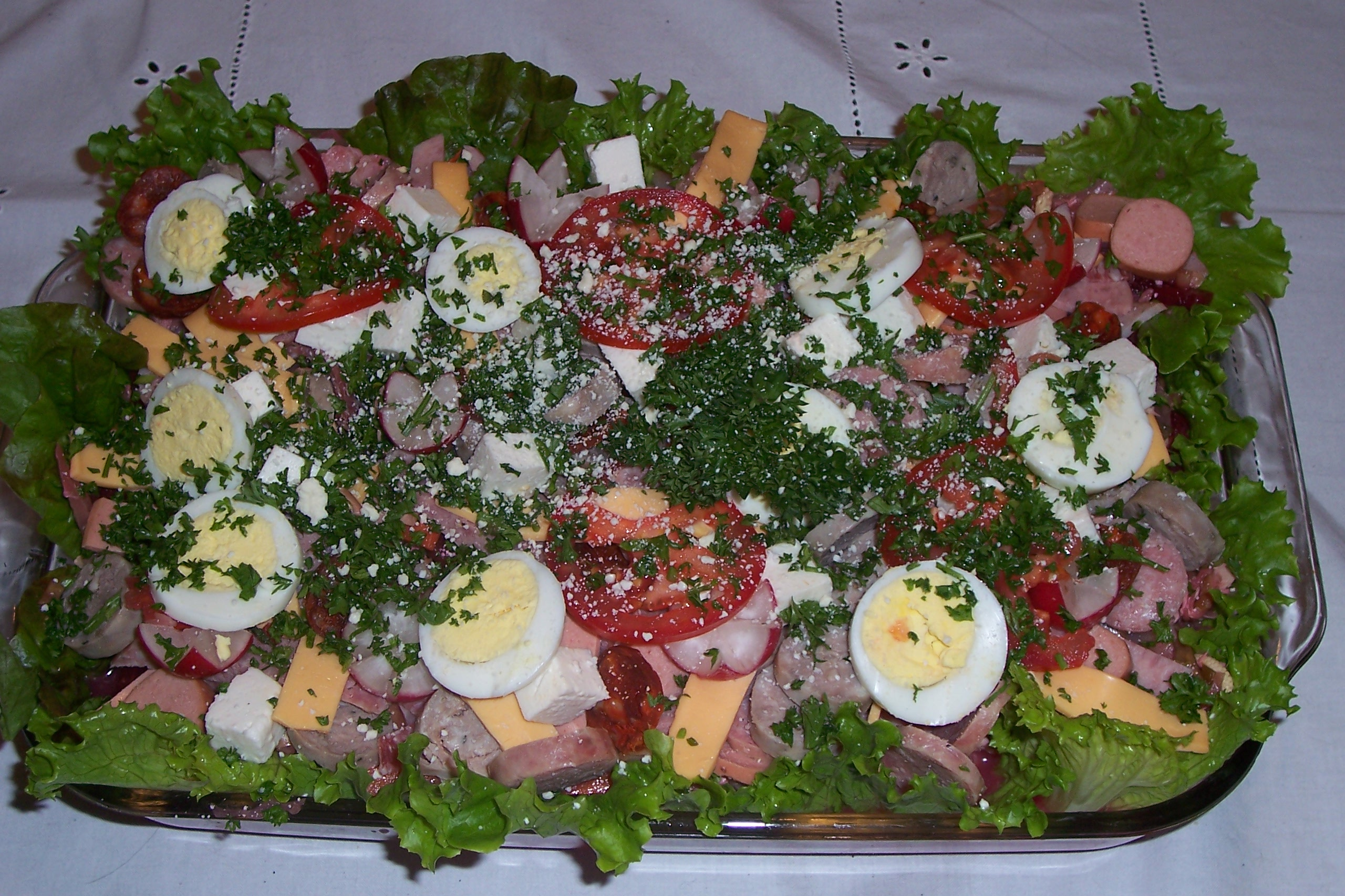
Fiambre is a traditional food from Guatemala eaten on November 1 and 2 in celebration of the Day of the Dead and All Saints Day. It is a chilled salad that may be made from over 50 ingredients.

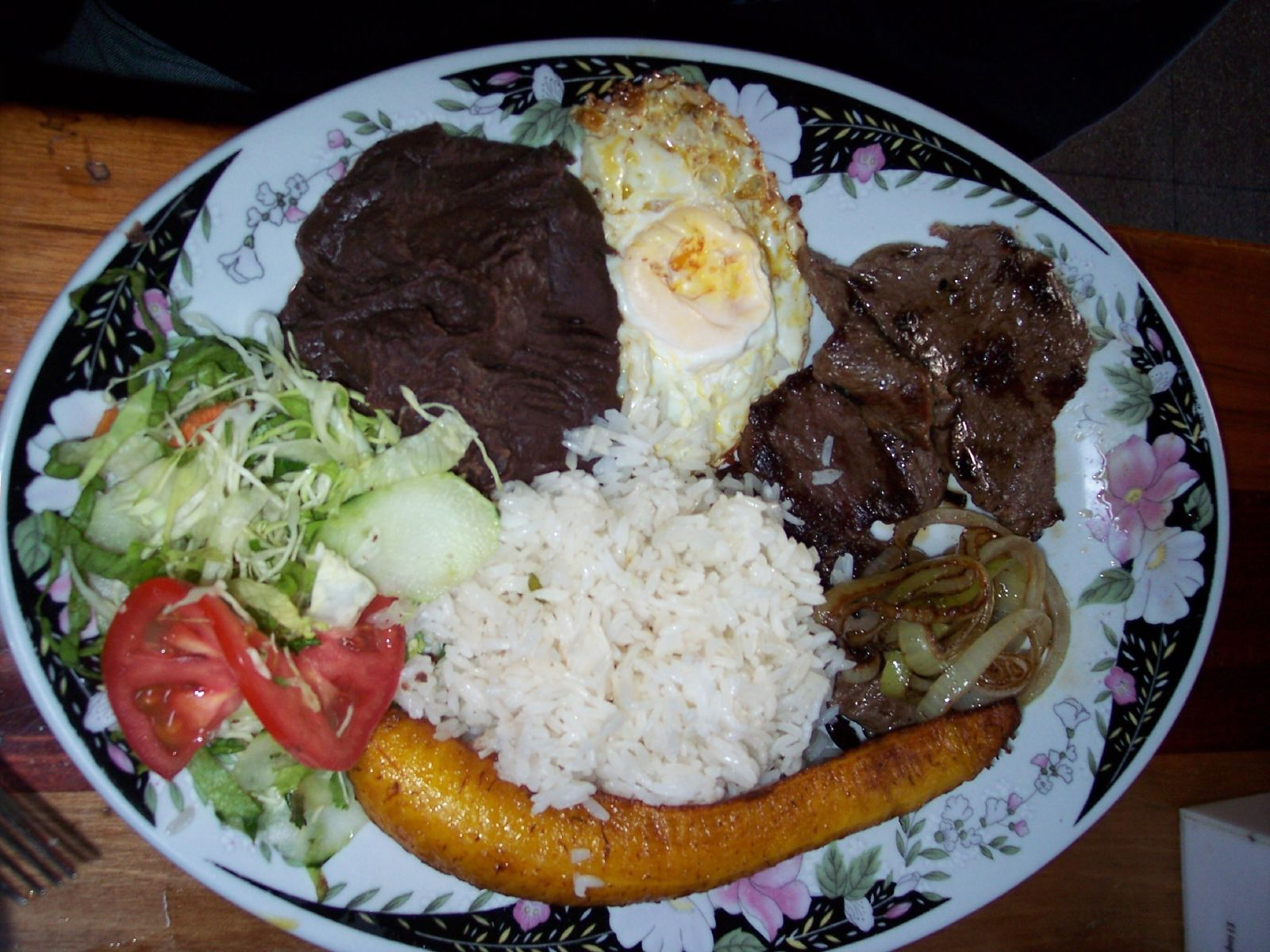
A casado is a Costa Rican meal consisting of a tortilla, rice, black beans, plantains, salad, and an optional protein source like beef, pork, chicken, fish, etc.

== South American cuisine ==
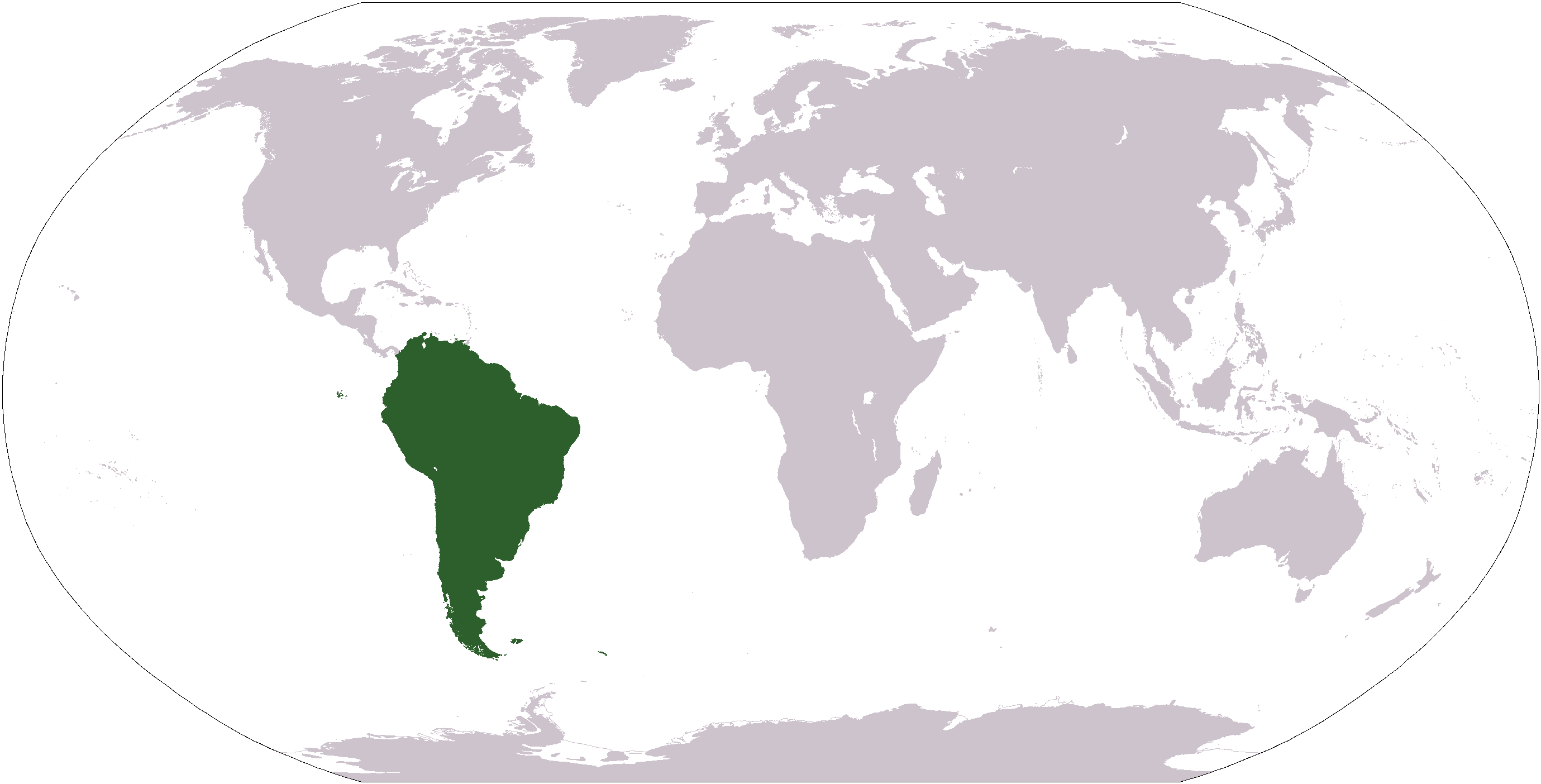

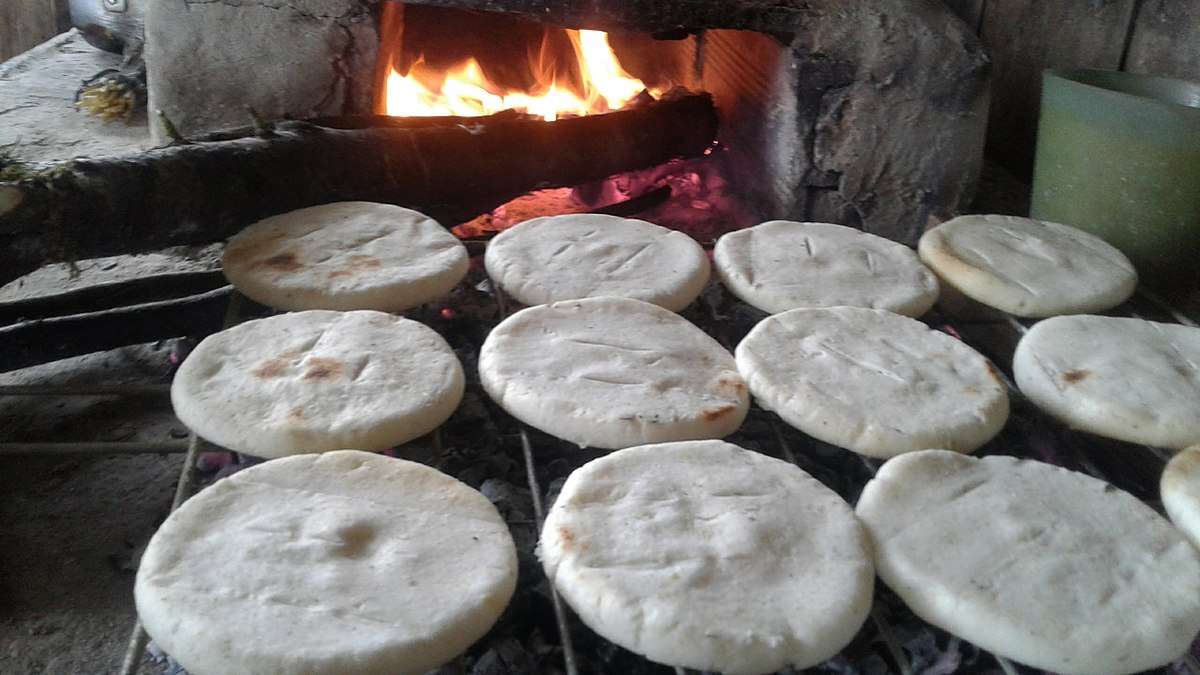
Arepa is most popular plate of Venezuelan Cuisine. Ais an earthenware bowl.

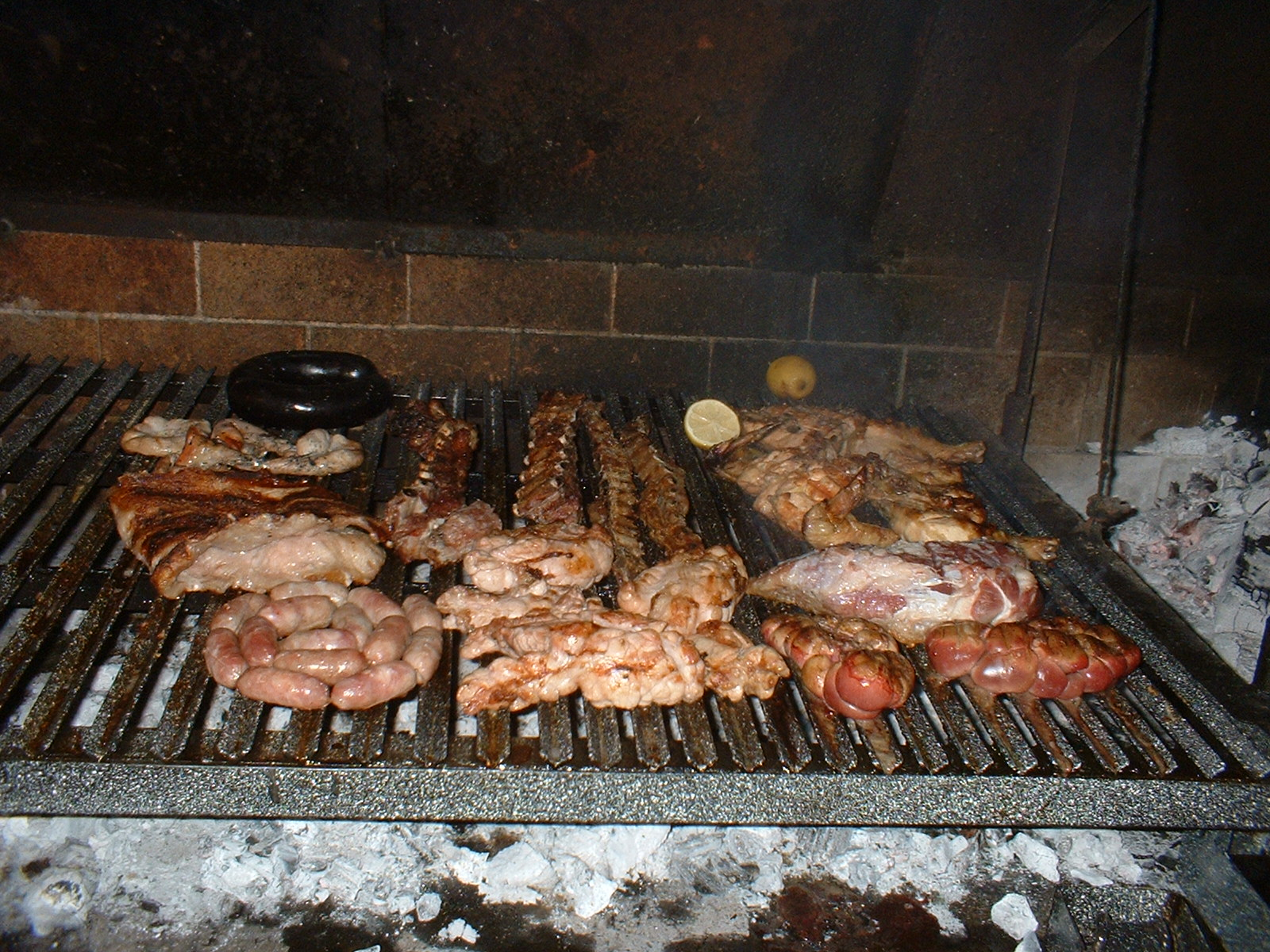
Asado with achuras (offal) and sausages. Asado is a term for barbecuing and the social event of having or attending a barbecue in Argentina, Uruguay, Paraguay, Chile and southern Brazil.

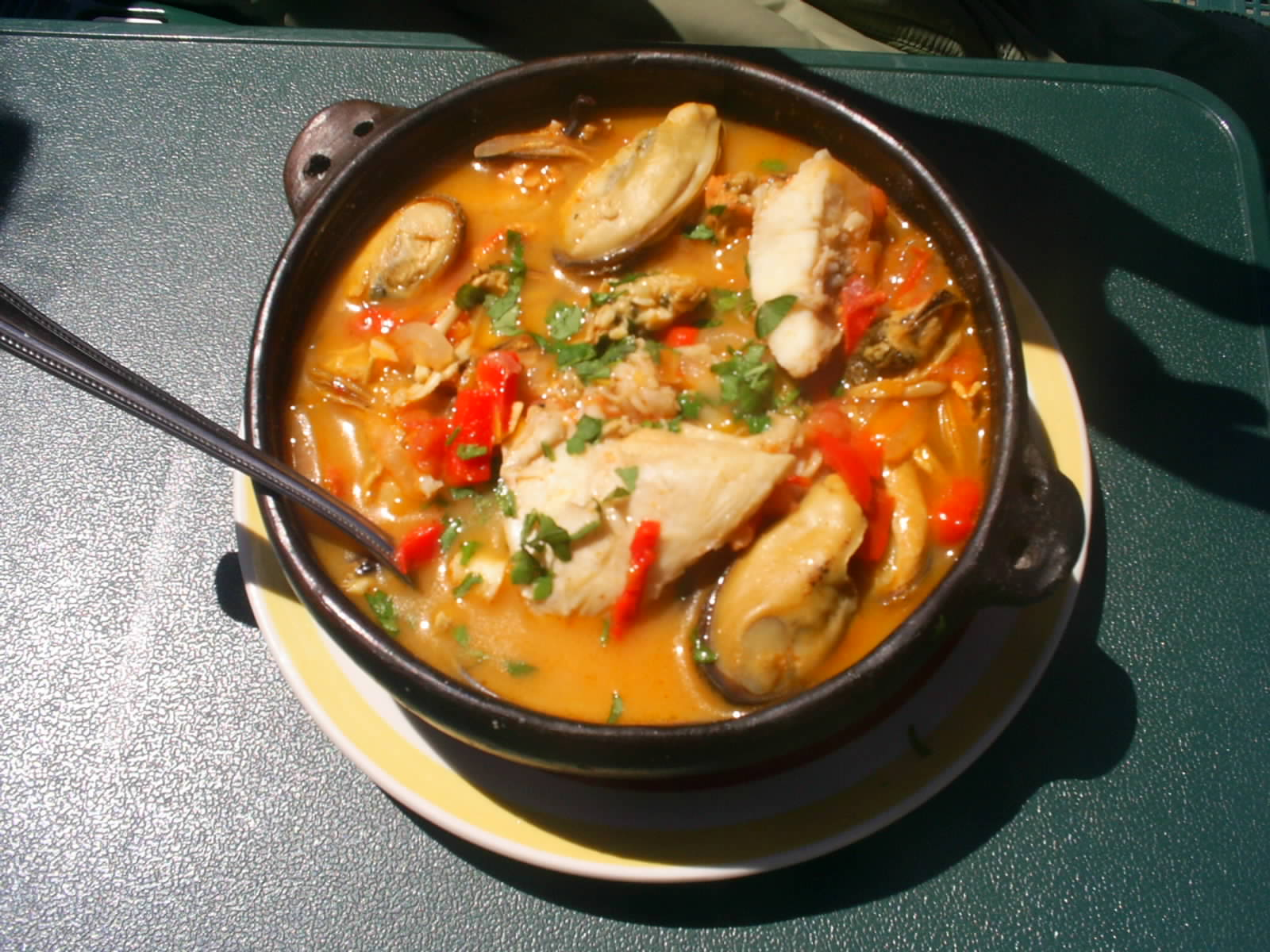
Paila marina is a common fish soup in Chile and other South American countries. A paila is an earthenware bowl.

- South American cuisine – Some of the richest food products of South America come from the middle of the continent, the Amazon basin. For example, the Amazon region provides a plethora of fresh fish and tropical fruits. In countries like Peru, there is a strong influence of the Inca Empire and their cuisine. Potatoes are frequently grown as a result of this, and also plants such as quinoa. Along the western coast of South America lies the Pacific Ocean, which provides a large array of seafood. Many plains are also on this continent, which are rich for growing food in abundance. In the Patagonian south of Argentina, many people produce lamb and venison. King crab is typically caught at the southern end of the continent. Antarctic krill has just recently been discovered and is now another food source. Tuna and tropical fish are caught all around the continent; Easter Island is one place where they are found in abundance. Lobster is also caught in great quantities from Juan Fernández. In Brazil, the most traditional dish is the feijoada.

- Argentine cuisine may be referred to as a cultural blending of indigenous Mediterranean influences (such as those exerted by Italian-Spanish and Arabic populations) with the wide scope of livestock and agricultural products which are abundant in the country.
- Bolivian cuisine
- Brazilian cuisine, like Brazil itself, varies greatly by region. The natural crops available in each region add to their singularity. Some typical dishes are caruru, which consists of okra, onion, dried shrimp and toasted nuts (peanuts or cashews) cooked with palm oil until a spread-like consistency is reached and moqueca capixaba, consisting of slow-cooked fish, tomato, onion and garlic topped with cilantro.
- Chilean cuisine stems mainly from the combination of Spanish cuisine with traditional Chilean ingredients, with later influences from other European cuisines, particularly from Germany, Italy, Croatia, France and the Middle East. The food tradition and recipes in Chile stand out due to the varieties in flavors and colors. The country's long coastline and the Chilean peoples' relationship with the sea adds an immense array of ocean products to the variety of the food in Chile. The country's waters are home to unique species of fish and shellfish such as the Chilean sea bass, loco and picoroco.
- Colombian cuisine refers to the cooking traditions and practices of Colombia. Along with other cultural expressions of national identity, Colombian cuisine varies among its many distinct regions. Colombians typically eat three meals a day: a large breakfast, a medium lunch between 12-2, and a light dinner. Colombian coffee is well known for its high standards in taste compared to others.
- Ecuadorian cuisine is diverse, varying with altitude and associated agricultural conditions. Pork, chicken, beef, and cuy (guinea pig) are popular in the mountain regions and are served with a variety of carbohydrate-rich foods, especially rice, corn and potatoes. A popular street food in mountain regions is hornado, consisting of potatoes served with roasted pig.
- French Guianan cuisine
- Guyanese cuisine
- Paraguayan cuisine is similar to the cuisines in Uruguay and the Falkland Islands. Cuisine of Paraguay, Uruguay and the Falkland Islands, Guarani and European Influences. Meats, vegetables, manioc, maize and fruits are common in Paraguayan cuisine. Barbecuing is both a cooking technique and often a social event, and are known as Asados.

- Cuisine of Asunción

- Peruvian cuisine reflects local cooking practices and ingredients—and, through immigration, influences from Spanish, Chinese, Italian, German, West African, and Japanese cuisine. Many traditional foods—such as quinoa, kiwicha, chili peppers, and several roots and tubers have increased in popularity in recent decades, reflecting a revival of interest in native Peruvian foods and culinary techniques.

- Peruvian-Chinese cuisine (chifa)

- Surinamese cuisine
- Uruguayan cuisine is traditionally based on its European roots, in particular, Mediterranean food from Italy, Spain, Portugal and France, but also from countries such as Germany and Britain, along with African and indigenous mixtures. The national drink is the Grappamiel.

- Cuisine of Montevideo

- Venezuelan cuisine – Due to its location in the world, its diversity of industrial resources and the cultural diversity of the Venezuelan people, Venezuelan cuisine often varies greatly from one region to another; however, its cuisine, traditional as well as modern, has strong ties to its European ancestry.

South American foods and dishes

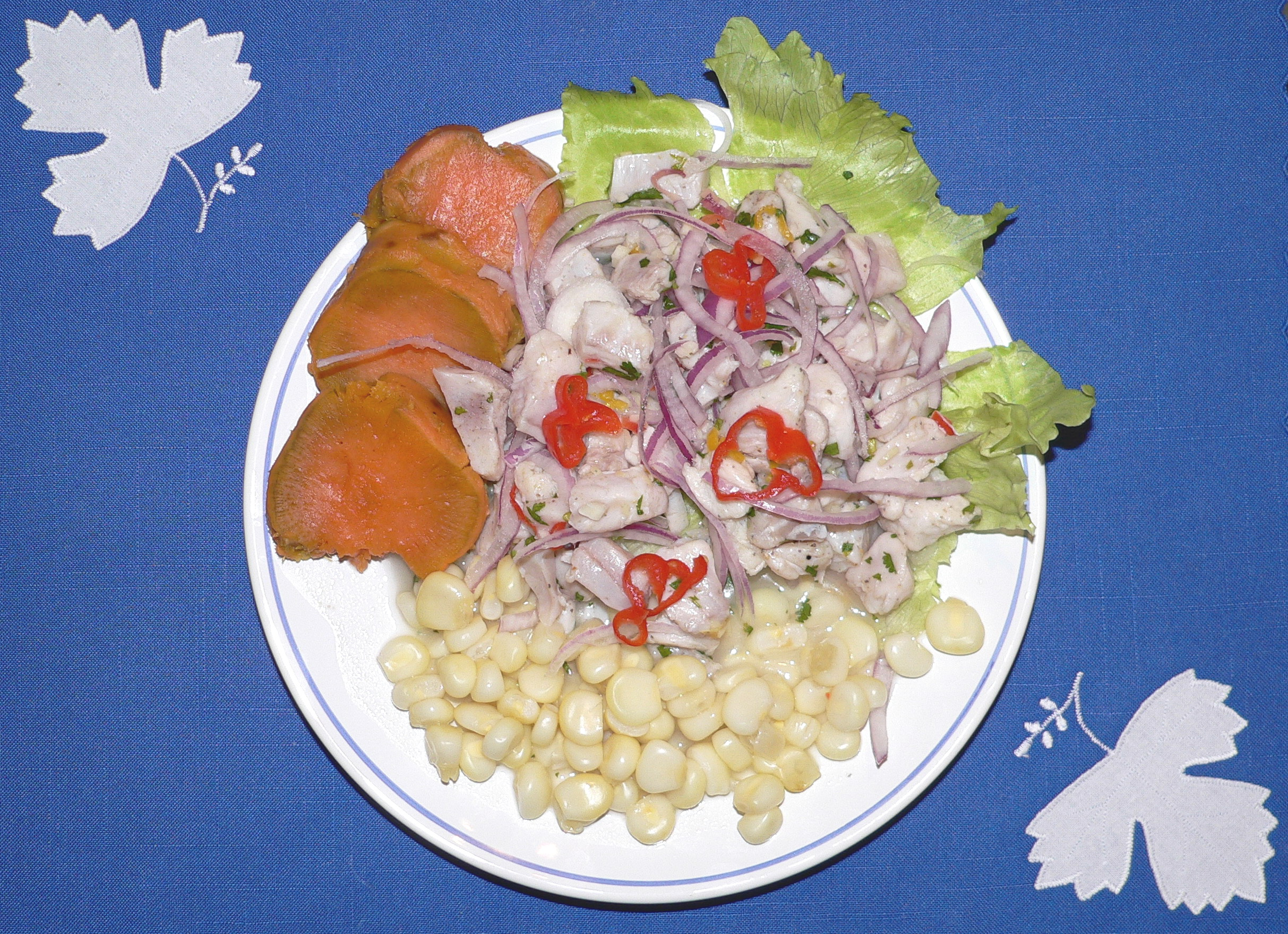
Cebiche, a seafood dish popular in Central and South America, especially in Peru

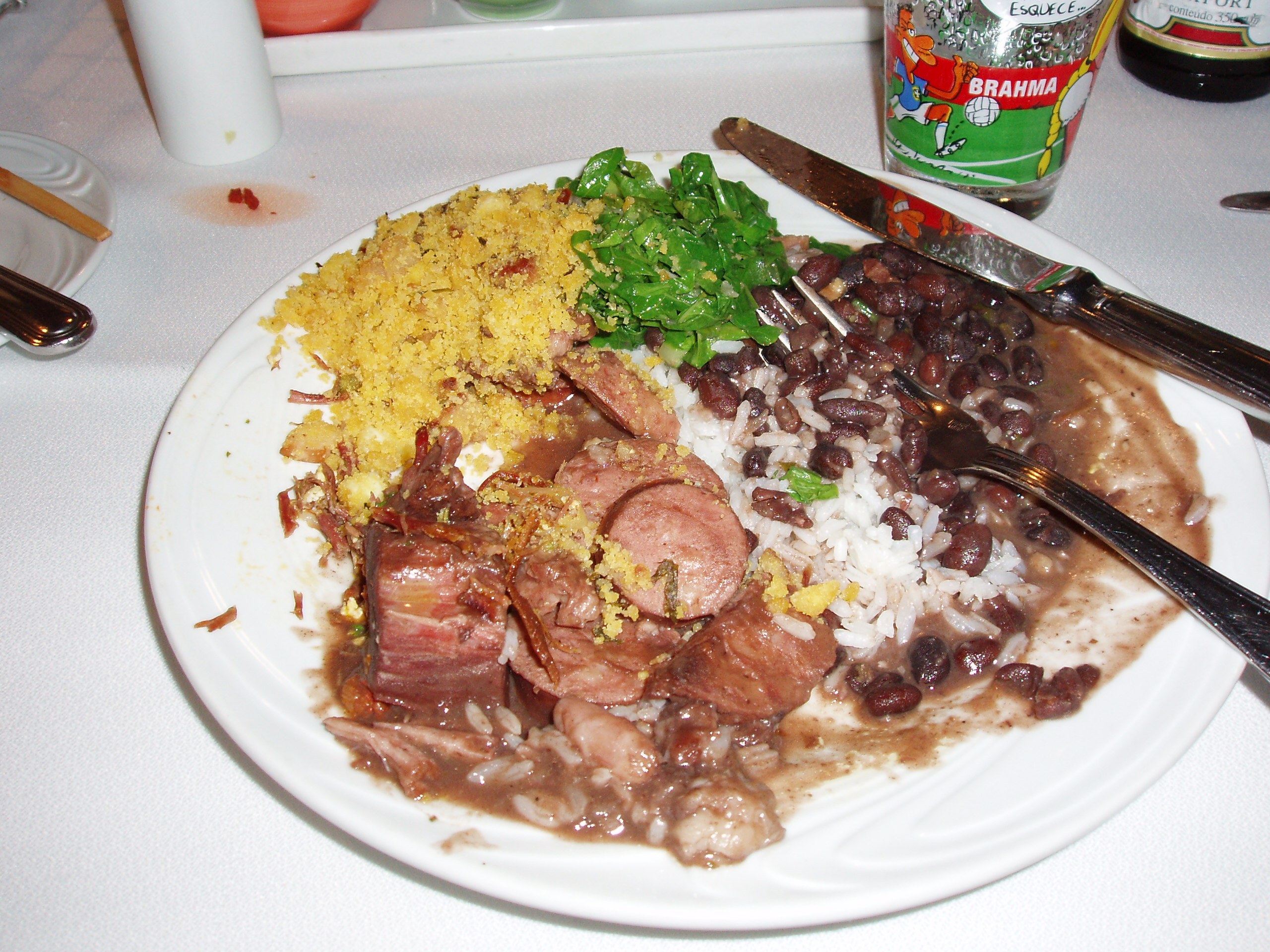
A typical Brazilian Feijoada, a stew of beans with beef and pork

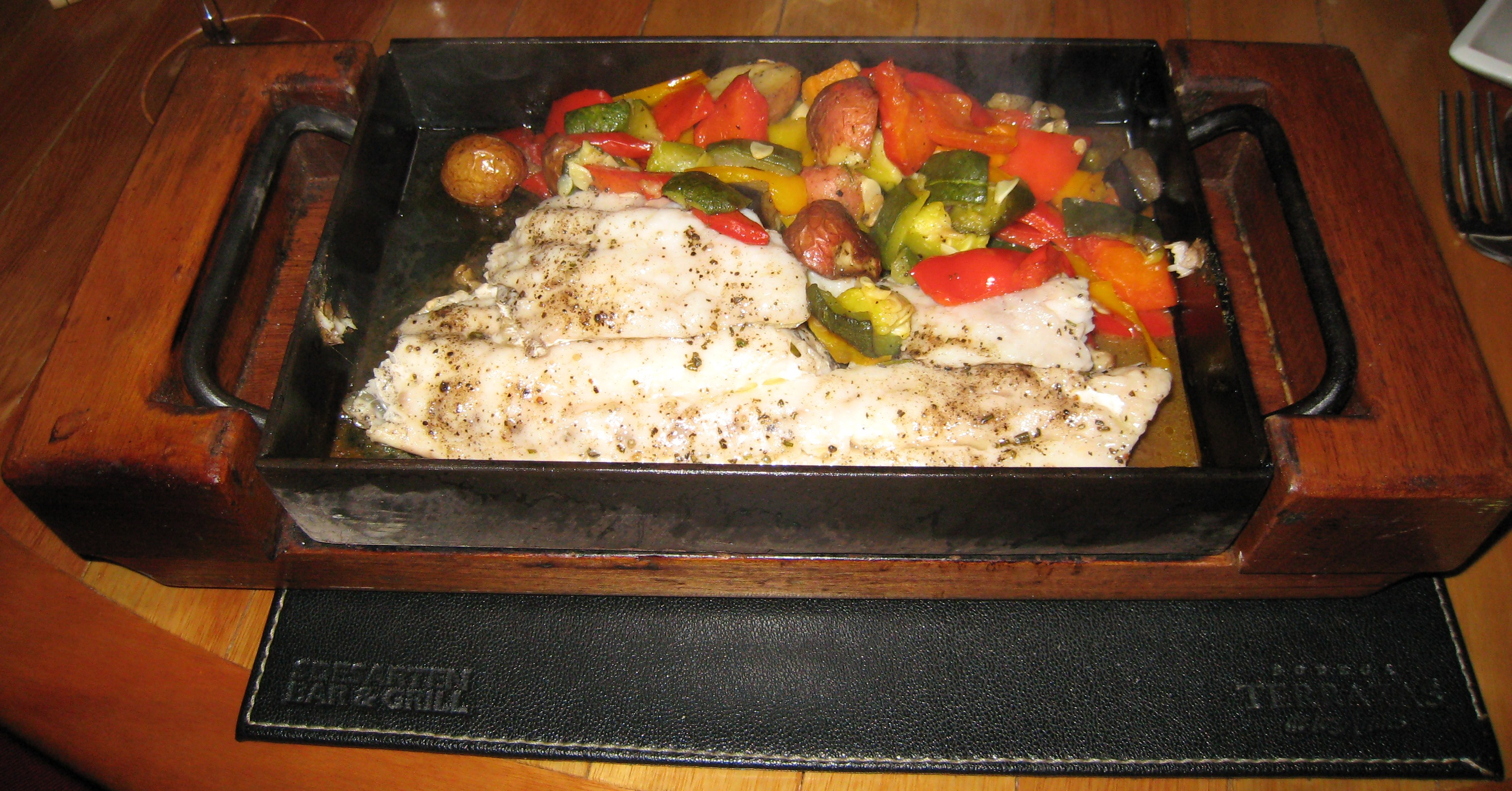
"Fish in a box", fresh fish served with Mediterranean vegetables in a Montevideo, Uruguay restaurant

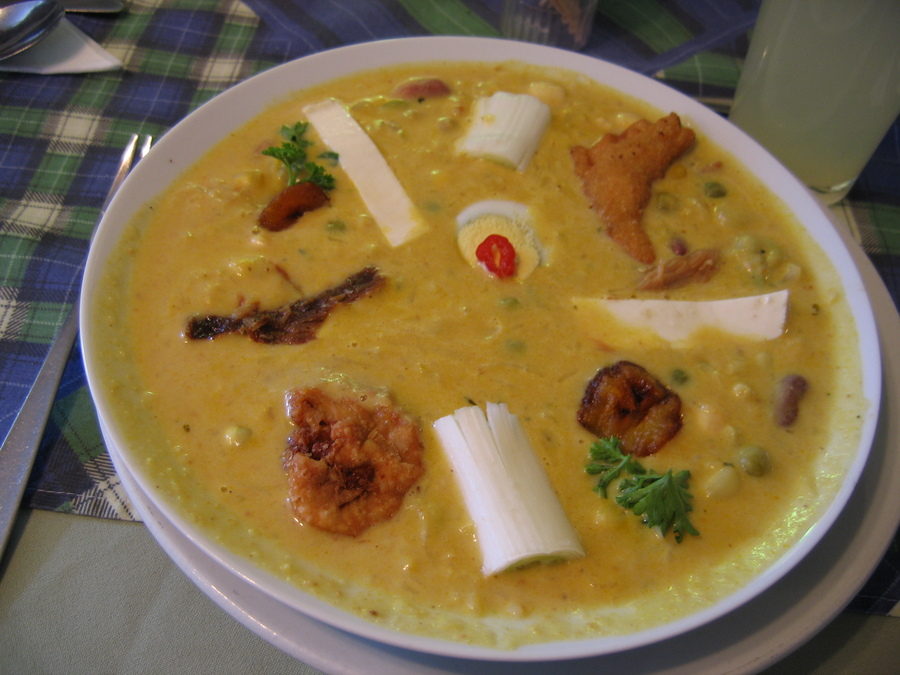
A bowl of fanesca served in Quito, Ecuador. It is a traditional soup of Ecuador served around Easter.

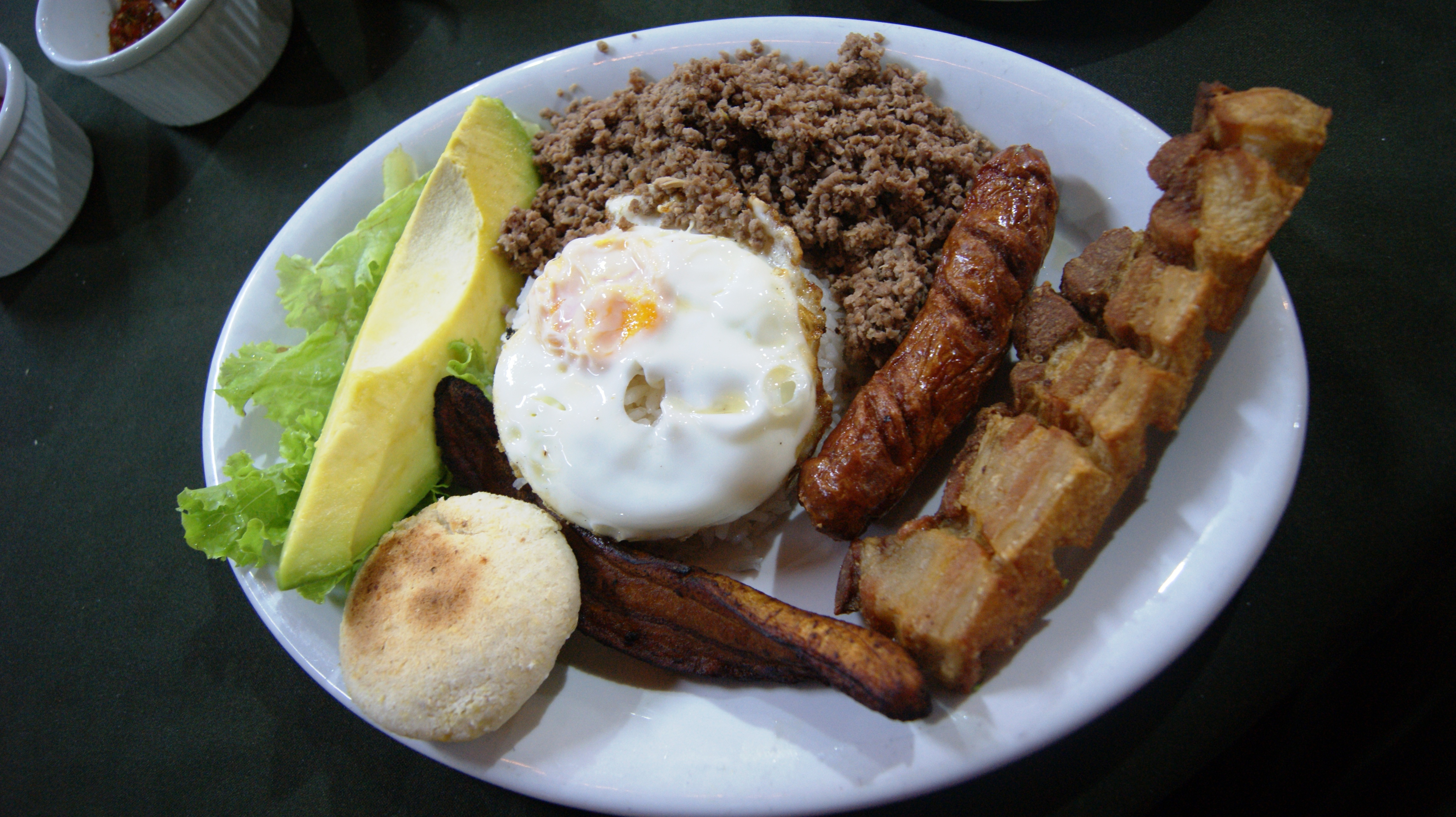
Bandeja paisa, a typical meal popular in Colombian cuisine. Includes red beans cooked with pork, white rice, ground meat, chicharon, fried egg, plantain, chorizo, arepa, hogao sauce, morcilla and avocado.

== Latin American cuisine ==
- Latin American cuisine – incorporates influences from all over the world. Most came due to colonization and the resulting mixtures among the Native Americans, European immigrants, and African slaves. Different waves of immigration (Some resulting from wars, such as World War II) have also had a hand in this mixture, mainly in the form of immigrants from central and eastern Europe and from east Asia (mainly China and Japan).
  - Caribbean cuisine – see above
  - Central American cuisine – see above
  - South American cuisine – see above

== See also ==
- Cuisine of the Americas
- List of cuisines
