= American cuisine (disambiguation) =

American cuisine refers to the culinary culture of the USA, including dishes like chicken nuggets, burgers, pancakes, fries, and apple pie.

American cuisine may also refer to:

- American Cuisine (film), a 1998 French film directed by Jean-Yves Pitoun
- Cuisine of the Americas, a variety of food preparation styles occurring in the Americas
