= Cuisine of the Americas =

Food preparation styles of the Caribbean, Central, North, and South America

Location of the Americas

The cuisine of the Americas, or Pan-American cuisine, is made up of a variety of food preparation styles.

== North America ==

North American cuisine consists of foods native to or popular in countries of North America, such as Canadian cuisine, American cuisine, Mexican cuisine, and Central American cuisine. North American cuisines display influence from many international cuisines, especially European cuisine, and including Native American cuisine, Jewish cuisine, and Asian cuisine. As a broad, geo-culinary term, North American cuisine also includes Central American and Caribbean cuisines. These regions are part of North America, so these regional cuisines also fall within the penumbra of North American cookery.

The term "regional" is somewhat ambiguous, however, since, for example, the cuisine of Puerto Rico can differ markedly from Cuban cuisine; Mexican cuisine spills across the border into the Tex-Mex and Mexi-Cali "sub-cuisines"; and the cuisines of Michigan and Ontario have more in common with each other than either has with the cuisines of Manitoba or Iowa.

=== Countries ===
- American cuisine
- Anguillan cuisine
- Antiguan and Barbudan cuisine
- Barbadian cuisine
- Bahamian cuisine
- Belizean cuisine
- Bermudian cuisine
- Canadian cuisine
- Caymanian cuisine
- Costa Rican cuisine
- Cuban cuisine
- Dominica cuisine
- Dominican Republic cuisine
- Greenlandic cuisine
- Grenadan cuisine
- Guatemalan cuisine
- Haitian cuisine
- Honduran cuisine
- Jamaican cuisine
- Mexican cuisine
- Nicaraguan cuisine
- Panamanian cuisine
- Puerto Rican cuisine
- Saint Lucian cuisine
- Salvadoran cuisine
- Trinidadian and Tobagonian cuisine
- Virgin Islands cuisine

== South America ==
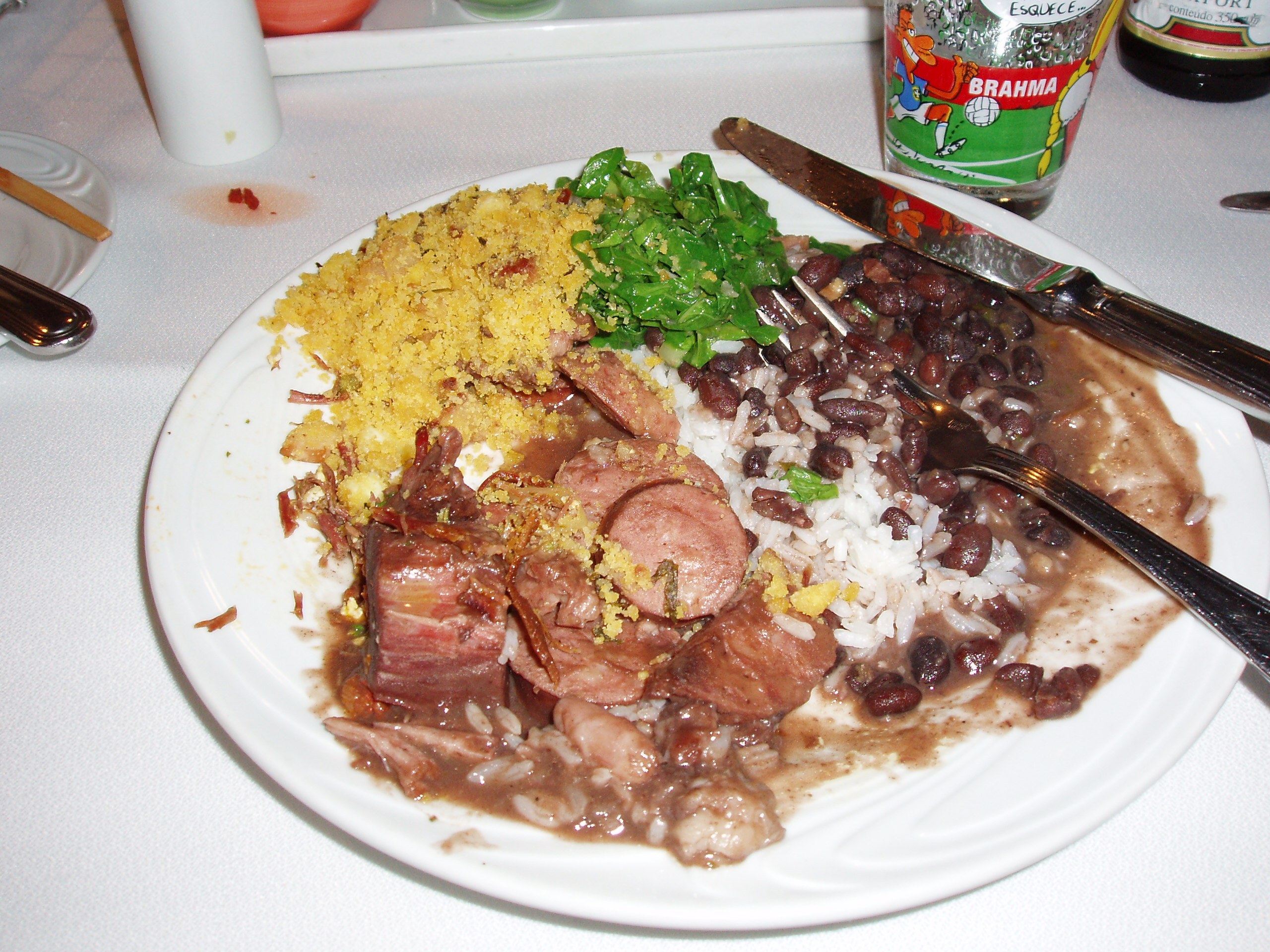
Brazilian Feijoada

Some of the richest products of South American cuisine come from the middle of the continent, the Amazon basin. In countries like Peru, there is a strong influence of the Inca and their cuisine. Potatoes are frequently grown as a result of this, and also plants such as quinoa. On the western coast of South America lies the Pacific Ocean, which provides a large array of seafood. Many plains are also on this continent, which are rich for growing food in abundance. In the Patagonia region south of Argentina, many people produce lamb and venison. King crab is typically caught at the southern end of the continent. Antarctic krill has just recently been discovered and is now considered a fine dish. Tuna and tropical fish are caught all around the continent, but Easter Island is one place where they are found in abundance. Lobster is also caught in great quantities from Juan Fernández. In Brazil, their most traditional dish is the feijoada.

=== Countries ===
- Argentine cuisine
- Bolivian cuisine
- Brazilian cuisine
- Chilean cuisine
- Colombian cuisine
- Ecuadorian cuisine
- Guyanese cuisine
- Paraguayan cuisine
- Peruvian cuisine
- Surinamese cuisine
- Uruguayan cuisine
- Venezuelan cuisine

== See also ==
- Latin American cuisine
- List of cuisines of the Americas
