= Barbadian cuisine =

Culinary traditions of Barbados

Barbadian cuisine, also called Bajan cuisine, is a mixture of African, Portuguese, Indian, Irish, Creole, Indigenous and British background. A typical meal consists of a main dish of meat or fish, normally marinated with a mixture of herbs and spices, hot side dishes, and one or more salads. The meal is usually served with one or more sauces.

The national dish of Barbados is cou-cou and fried flying fish with spicy gravy. Another traditional meal is pudding and souse, a dish of pickled pork with spiced sweet potatoes. A wide variety of seafood and meats are also available.

== Main courses ==
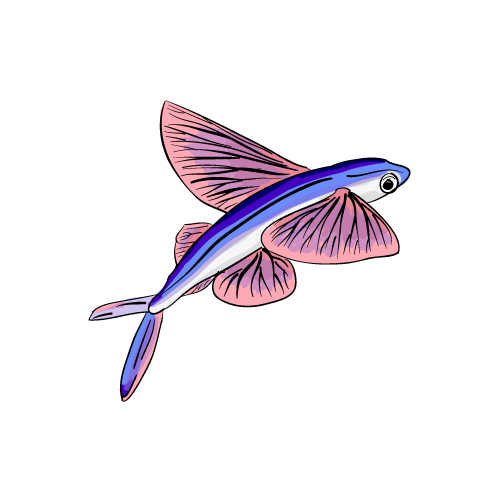
Illustration of a flying fish

- Fried flying fish
- Fried or grilled fish such as kingfish, swordfish, mahi mahi, and "dolphin" (dolphinfish). A whole roast red snapper is a delicacy.
- Brown stew chicken
- Cou-cou and steamed flying fish
- Barbecued or stewed lamb or pork chops
- Curry beef or mutton
- Rotisserie chicken/pan chicken
- Baked or fried chicken
- Grilled or fried prawns
- Grilled turkey wings
- Saltfish in a spicy tomato sauce
- Pepperpot
- Sweet potato pie
- Chicken curry
- Pickled chicken feet
- Barbequed pig tails
- Guava cheese
- Black cake

== Hot side dishes ==
- Rice and peas – rice with split peas and gravy
- Macaroni pie
- Cou-cou
- Sweet potato, grilled, mashed or as fries
- English potato, grilled, mashed or as fries
- Fried plantain
- Breadfruit, grilled or fried
- Chow mein
- Steamed mixed vegetables, such as broccoli, pumpkin, cabbage, and onion
- Buttered cassava or yam

== Salads ==
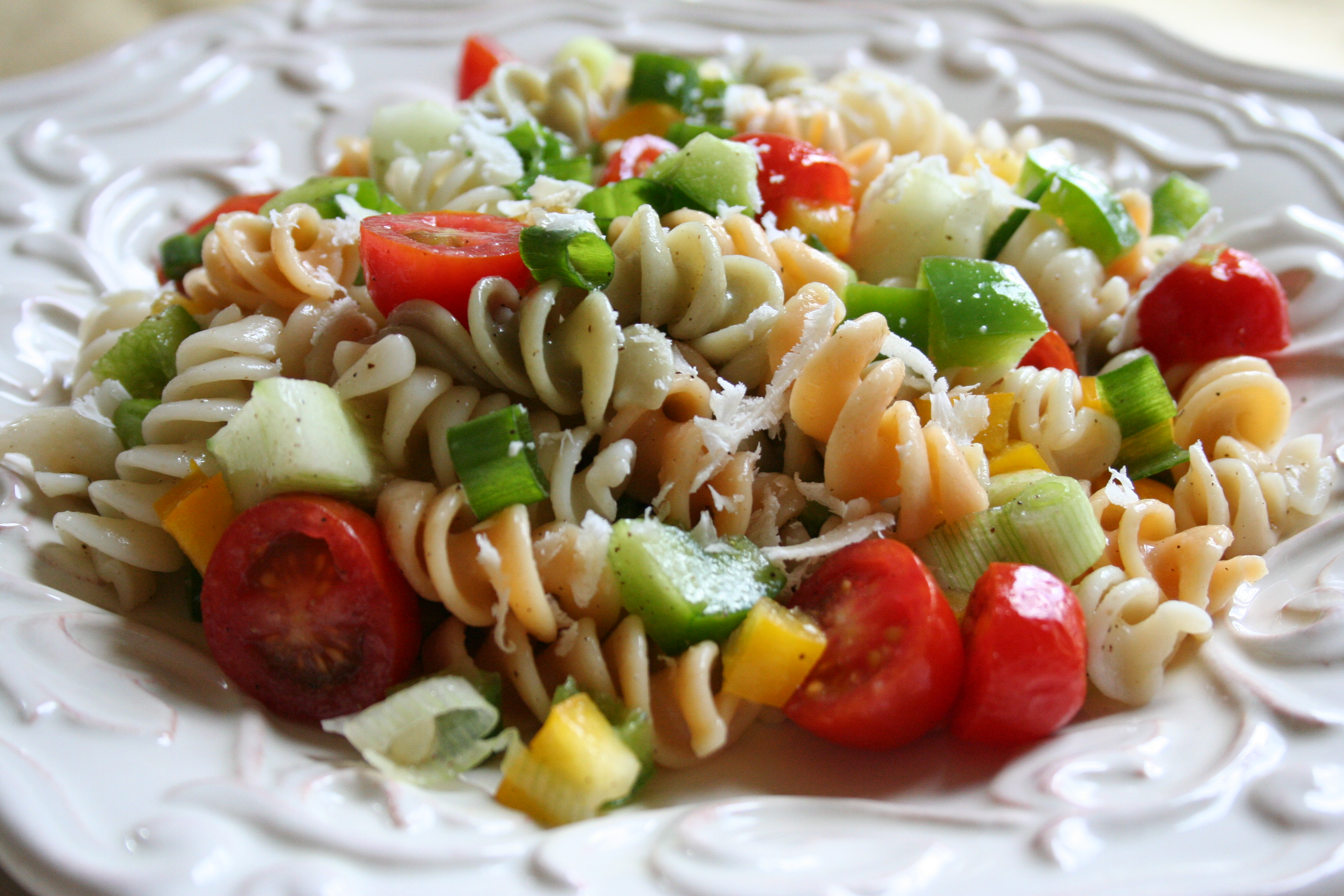
Pasta salad

- Garden salad
- Pasta salad
- Potato salad
- Coleslaw
- Plain sweetcorn, beetroot, or pineapple

== Sauces ==
- Bajan pepper sauce
- Ketchup
- Tartar sauce for fish

== Lighter meals ==
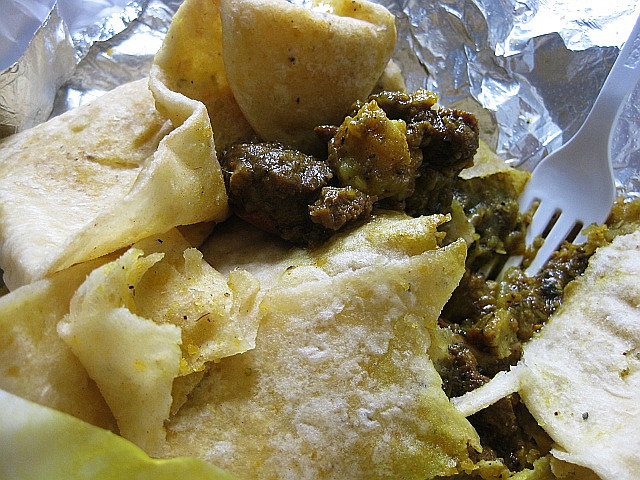
Goat roti

- Bakes
- Cassava pone, a kind of savoury cassava cake
- Conkies
- Cutters (fried flying fish in a bap)
- Fishcake
- Pumpkin soup
- Samosas, often made with conch
- Turnovers
- Wrap roti, usually with beef, chicken or saltfish with potatoes, spices, and sometimes chickpeas

== Beverages ==
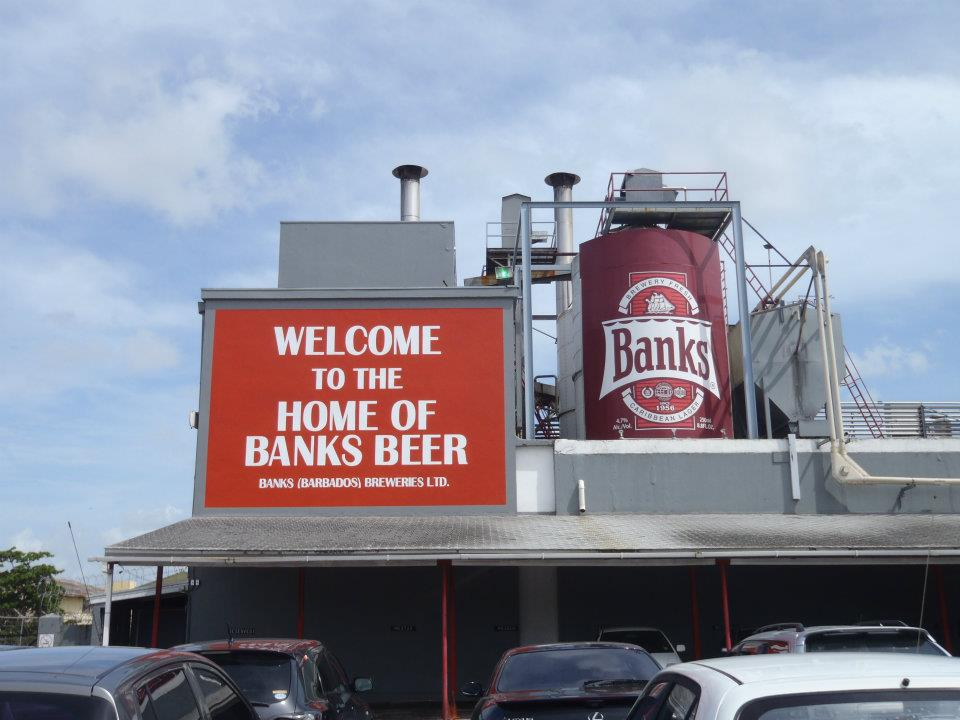
Banks beer brewery

- Rum and rum punch
- Banks beer
- Hibiscus tea
- Mauby
- Fruit juice
- Tamarind drink
- Soursop drink
- Golden apple drink
- Sorrel drink
- Coconut water
- Ginger beer
