= Trinidad and Tobago cuisine =

Culinary traditions of Trinidad and Tobago

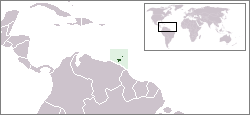
Location of Trinidad and Tobago

Trinidad and Tobago's cuisine is influenced by Indian-South Asian, West African, Creole, European, North American, Chinese, Amerindian, Latin American, and Levantine culinary styles.

== Main meals ==
=== Breakfast dishes ===
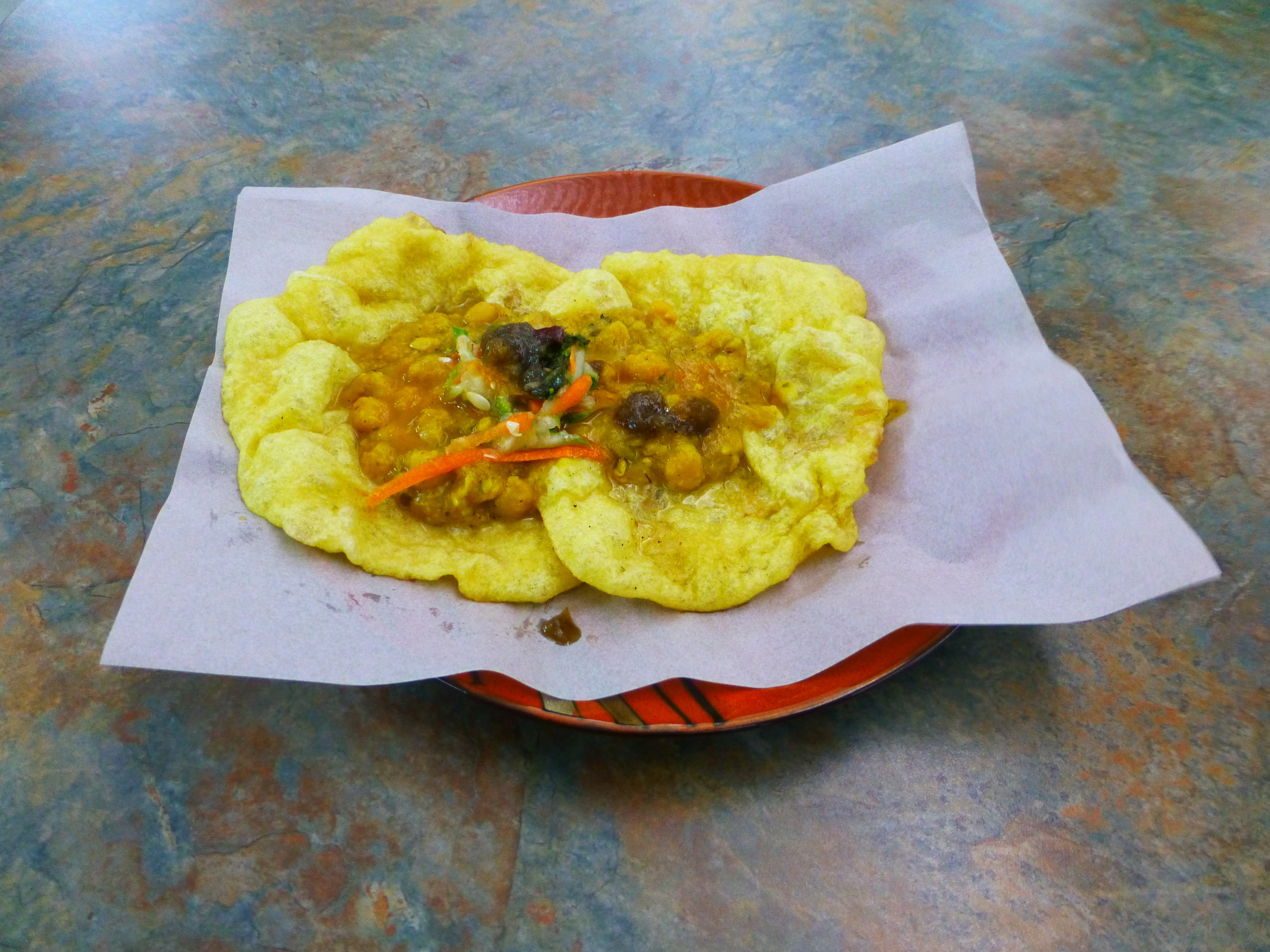
Doubles

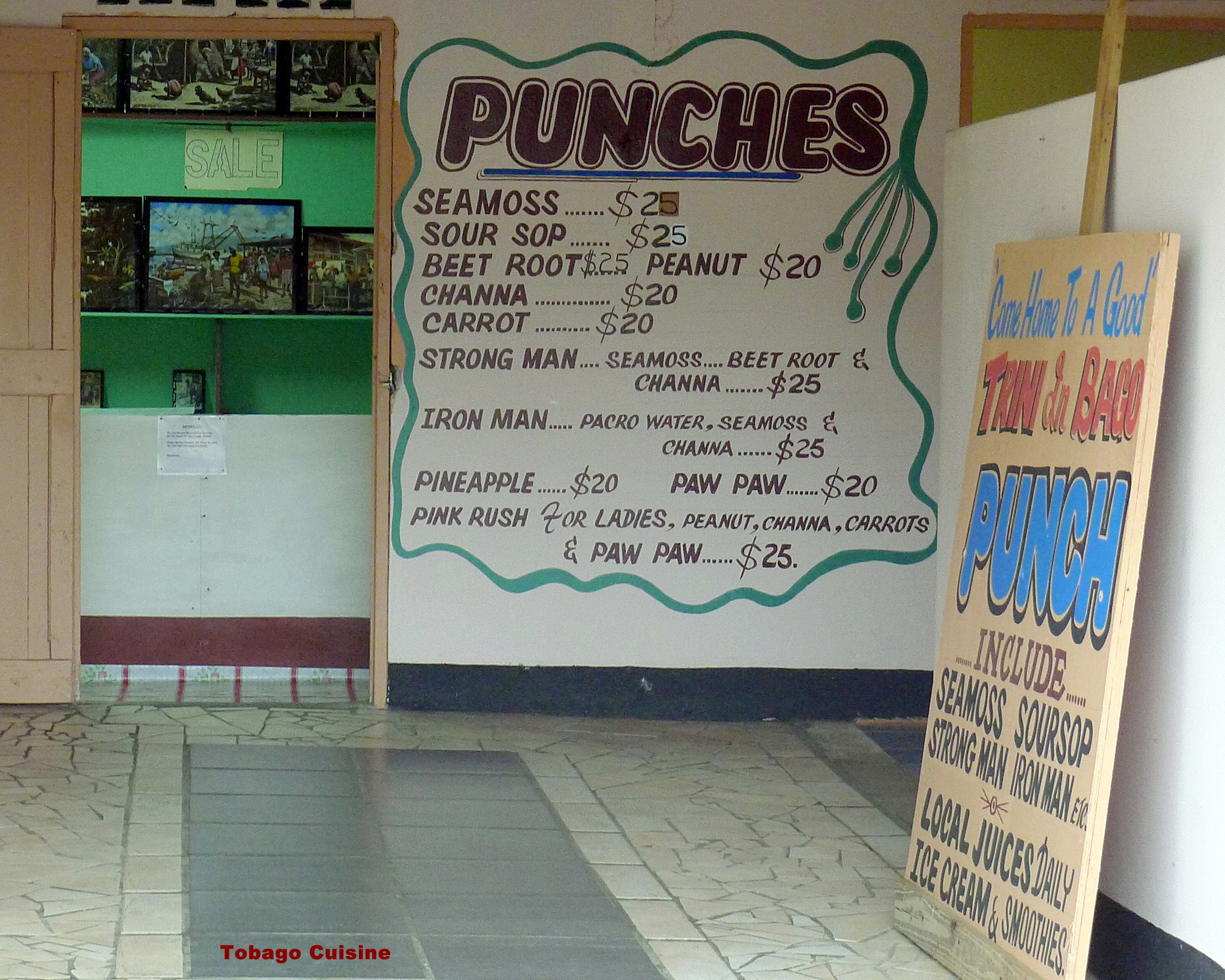
Tobago cuisine: pacro water and sea moss drinks

Popular breakfast foods include doubles, made with two baras (flat fried dough) and curried channa (chickpeas). They are usually served with toppings such as pepper sauce, kuchela, tamarind, mango, pommecythere, cucumber, and bandhaniya chutneys. Doubles are one of the most popular breakfast foods eaten on the islands, but are commonly consumed throughout the day.

A traditional Indo-Trinidadian and Tobagonian breakfast consists of sada roti, a type of unleavened bread made with flour, baking powder and water. The dough is rolled out and cooked on flat, cast-iron skillet called a tawa. The cooked dough is cut into quarters and served with a variety of fried vegetables, tarkaris or chokhas. Sada rotis are usually eaten with baigan chokha (roasted and mashed eggplant), damadol chokha (roasted and mashed tomatoes) and pepper chokha (roasted and mashed peppers).

Other common dishes include aloo chokha (boiled, roasted, and mashed potatoes), karaili chokha (roasted and mashed bittermelon) and murtani or upar ghar (combination of roasted and mashed eggplant, tomato, pepper, and okra); fried or curried bodi (long beans), aloo (potatoes), ochro or bhindhi (okra), seim (hyacinth beans); fried or curried karaili (bittermelon), saijan (drumstick) and lauki (bottle gourd), pumpkin or kohra tarkari (pumpkin simmered with spices and seasoning); and bhaji (made with young dasheen bush (taro) leaves, spinach leaves, saijan (drumstick) leaves, or chaurai (spiny amaranth) leaves), and fried plantains.

Fried bake (a fried unleavened bread) is usually served with fried shark, saltfish (dried and salted cod), buljol (saltfish with fresh sweet peppers, tomatoes, cucumbers and sometimes boiled eggs), sardines, herring (smoked, salted, and dried fish), bacon, fried plantain, brown stew chicken, or corned beef with onions and tomatoes.

Coconut bake (coconut bread) is usually served with fried accra (saltfish fritters), buljol, black pudding, butter, cheese paste (a mixture of cheese, butter, mustard, grated onion, mayonnaise and green seasoning) or stewed meat, like chicken.

Bake and shark is a popular breakfast dish at local beaches, like Maracas Beach (Trinidad) and Store Bay (Tobago), especially on the weekend.

Other breakfast foods include tannia cakes (fried dasheen cake), and boiled cassava with butter.

Common hot drinks consumed for breakfast include cocoa tea (hot chocolate) made from homemade cocoa balls, cornmeal porridge and farine (an Amerindian treat).

=== Lunch and dinner ===
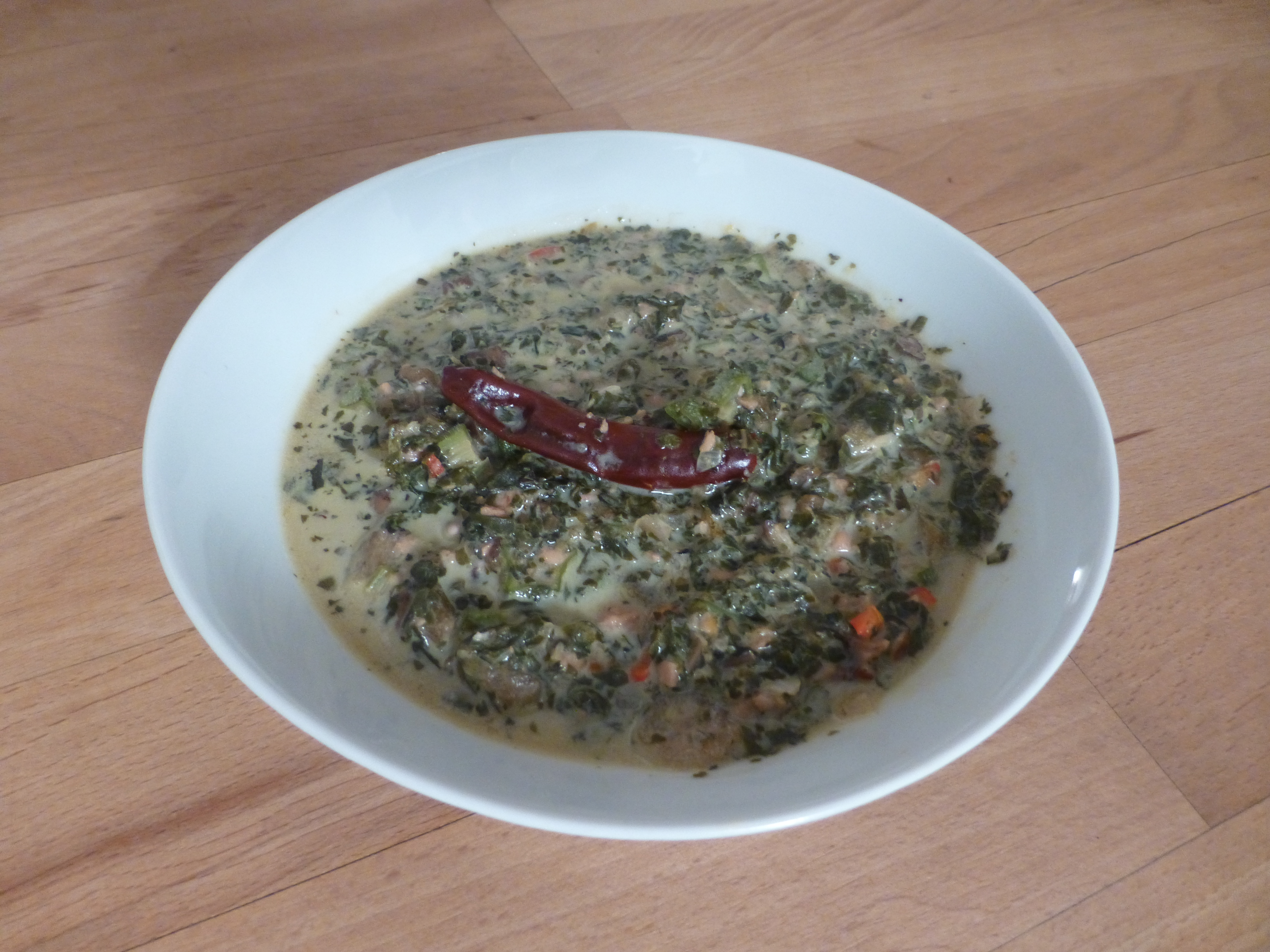
Callaloo

A nationally well-known dish with African roots is callaloo, a side dish made of young dasheen or taro leaves, okra, crab or pigtails, pumpkin, onions, coconut milk, pimento, and green seasoning like chives, cilantro and culantro. Callaloo is often served with cornmeal coo coo, plantain, cassava, sweet potatoes, dumplings, rice, and curried crab. However, Trinidad callaloo is not prepared or served the same as Jamaican callaloo.

Pelau is a well-known rice-based dish in Trinidad and Tobago typically prepared as a one-pot meal by caramelising sugar and browning meat before simmering rice, pigeon peas, and coconut milk together. Other frequently served rice-based meals include dhal and rice, and rice and stewed chicken, pork, ox-tail, fish or lamb. Also common are breadfruit oil down and macaroni pie, consisting of pasta baked with eggs and cheese, and a variety of other potential ingredients. One of the best-known Trinidadian dishes is curried duck served with either roti or rice.

An array of fish and seafood can be bought at local merchants throughout Trinidad and Tobago, such as flying fish, king fish, carite, prawns and shrimp, sapatay, red fish, bonito, lobster, conch and crab, tilapia and seasonal cascadura.

Tobagonian food is dominated by a wide selection of seafood dishes, most notably curried crab and dumplings. Tobago is also known for dasheen, sweet potato, eddoe, cassava, yam, soups and stews, also known as "blue food" across the country. "Fish broth", a soup made in the style of bouillabaisse, is frequently served as a main or side dish.

Another local dish is the rare cascadura, a small freshwater fish. The fish is curried and served with lagoon rice and cassava and yams. There is a local legend in Trinidad that anyone who eats cascadu will return to Trinidad to end their days.

== Condiments ==
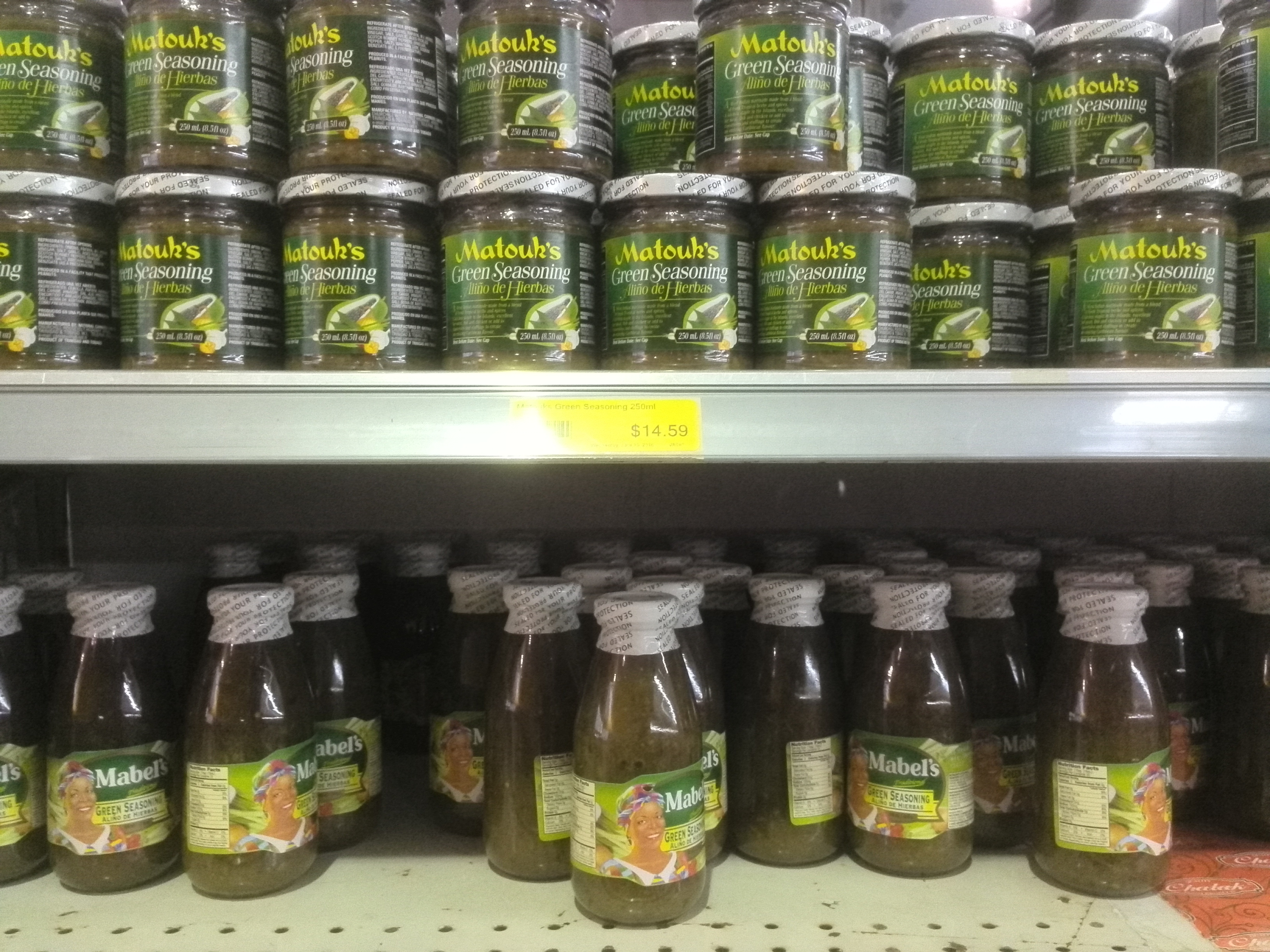
Green seasoning in a supermarket

Trinidadians accompany their meals with various condiments; these can include pepper sauces, chutneys and pickles and are often homemade.

Pepper sauces are made by using Scotch bonnet or other hot peppers, either minced or chopped and other spices. It can sometimes include lime or lemon as well as other vegetables, and come in many variations and flavours. The murtanie ("mother-in-law") is another popular condiment that is a coarsely chopped spicy medley of Scotch bonnet peppers, carrots, karaili (bittermelon), and other spices.

Chutneys are frequently used as well and often include chaltar (Dillenia indica), mango, tamarind, cucumber, pommecythère, bandhaniya, dhaniya, tomato, and coconut. They are most commonly eaten with doubles, aloo pie, saheena, baiganee, kachori, and pholourie. There are a variety of commonly eaten pickles known locally as achar. Kuchela is a grated spicy version, usually made from green mango but sometimes made from pommecythère, green apple, or green papaya. Other version of achars are made from mango, pommecythère, tamarind, amla, amrak, lemon, lime, and chulta.

Green seasoning is a very common cold sauce based on culantro or chadon beni, pureed with green onions, garlic, pimento, vinegar, and other herbs; it may be used as a table condiment or marinade.

== Street and fast foods ==
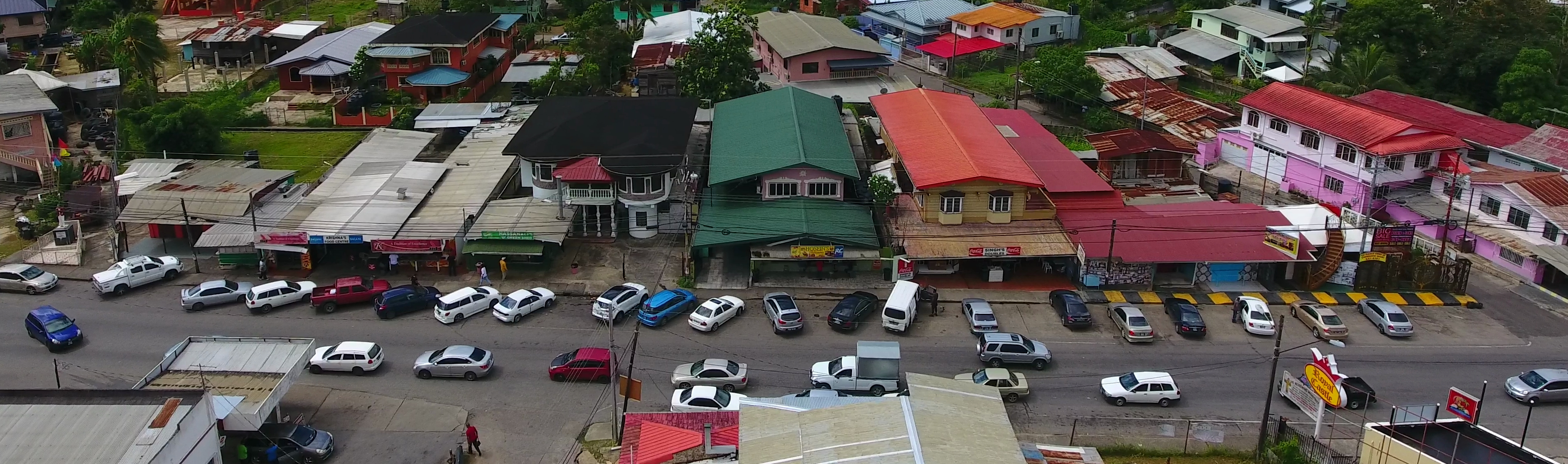
Food stalls in Debe

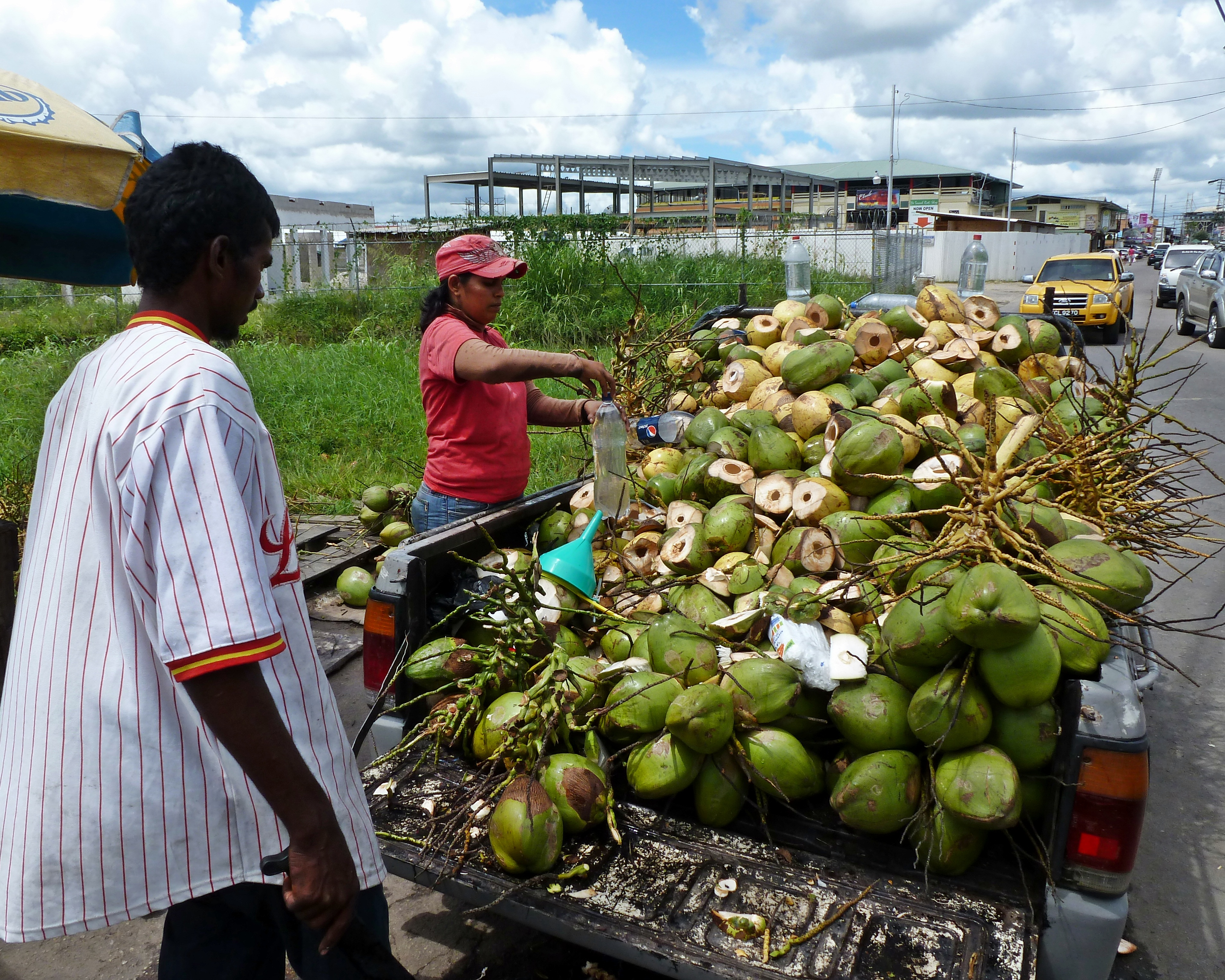
Coconut vendor in Marabella

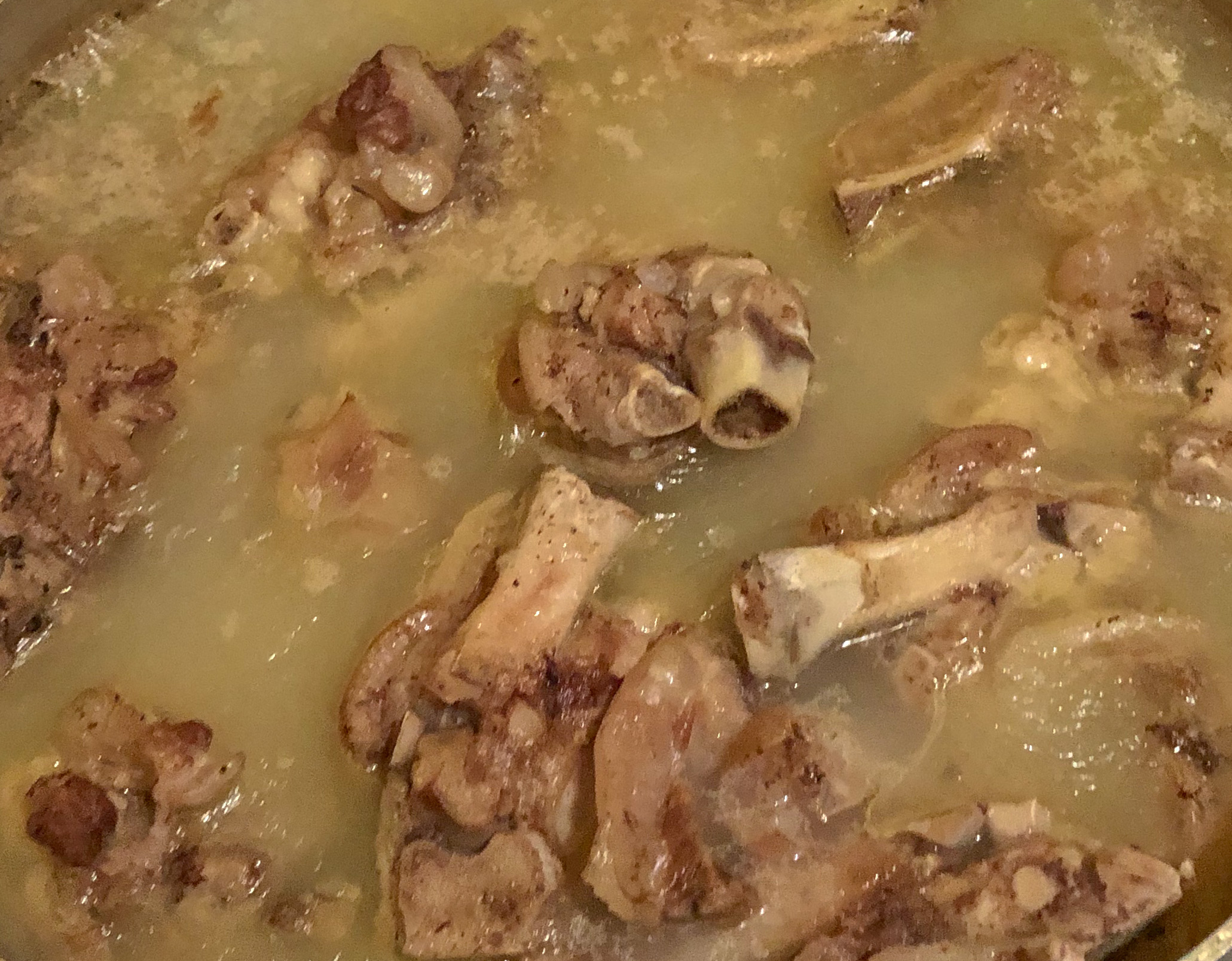
Cooking Trinidadian Souse

Popular freshly prepared street foods include:

- Indo-Trinidadian and Tobagonian foods like doubles, aloo pie, pholourie, saheena, baiganee, bara, and kachori are popular street foods throughout the country.
- Another popular Indo-Trinidadian and Tobagonian street food is wrap roti, (usually paratha, dhalpuri, or dosti roti). It is served with fillings like vegetables, such as bhajee, kohra tarkari (pumpkin), curried channa (chickpeas) and aloo (potatoes), aloo tarkari, arui (eddoes), baigan (eggplant), seim (lablab bean), bodi (long bean) and soya, or with meats or seafood such as curried chicken, fish, goat, shrimp, beef, duck, conchs, and lobster.
- Pepper roti is also popular, especially around Diwali time. It is a paratha filled with freshly chopped hot peppers and a boiled and mashed potato filling that is seasoned with shredded cheddar cheese, grated carrots, garlic, onion, bandhaniya (chadon beni), salt, black pepper, ground geera, amchar masala, and garam masala.
- Indian sweets are frequented especially around Hindu and Islamic holidays. Other sweets frequently sold are toolum, sugar cake, fudge, and pawpaw balls.
- Bake and shark (most popular at Maracas Beach along the north coast of Trinidad) is a fried dish that is topped with fresh fruit like pineapple; vegetables like cucumber and salad; and a variety of sauces and seasonings.
- Souse is made from pig, cow or chicken feet or cucumbers. This is seasoned with onion, garlic, salt, pimento, scotch bonnet peppers, lemon and chadon beni. Mostly served warm or slightly chilled, it is also rumoured to be a cure to hangovers.
- Other common street foods include wontons, corn soup, geera pork and chicken, kebabs, gyros, shwarma, pasteles, and raw oysters (usually served with a spicy sweet/hot sauce with chadon beni/bandhaniya).
- Pows (Cantonese steamed buns filled with meat, typically char siu pork) are also popular.
- Fish, cheese, channa (chickpeas), chicken, and beef pies are common street foods. Sausage rolls are also eaten as midday snacks and are available at stands usually found along the nation's streets. Bread and channa is also popular.
- When in season, roast and boiled corn on the cob can be found any time day or night.
- On hot days, locals enjoy ice cream, snow cones (served in various colours, flavours and shapes, often sweetened with condensed milk), ice pops, kulfi, freezies, sucker bag, coconut slushies, coconut water, and fresh coconut jelly.
- On festive occasions (Carnival, Borough Days, and most public holidays), street foods also include wild meat such as deer, iguana, manicou (phalangeriformes), tatou (armadillo), and agouti, to name a few. These are prepared either as a brown stew or curry dish, and served with a wide choice of local pepper sauces.

North American fast foods and street foods have also become increasingly popular in Trinidad and Tobago since the late 20th century, especially with the arrival of North American fast food chains. Foods such as barbecue, fried chicken, hot dogs, hamburgers, cheeseburgers, veggie burgers, pizzas, chicken sandwiches, sausages, subs, wraps, corn dogs, French fries, pretzels, waffles, pancakes, doughnuts, cookies, nachos, tacos, burritos, and several coffee drinks have found popularity in Trinidad and Tobago. Kentuck Fried Chicken (KFC), which first came in 1973, is one of the most popular fast food chains in the country and is world-renowned as being one of the best countries for KFC. The world-famous KFC Zinger sandwich was first created in Trinidad and Tobago. Some of the other North American fast food restaurants in Trinidad and Tobago are McDonald's, Burger King, Wendy's, Starbucks, Church's Texas Chicken, Popeyes Louisiana Kitchen, Subway, Little Caesars, and Dairy Queen. Trinidad and Tobago also has a few local fast food chains such as Royal Castle, Mario's Pizzeria, and Ritual's Coffee House.

== Festival foods ==
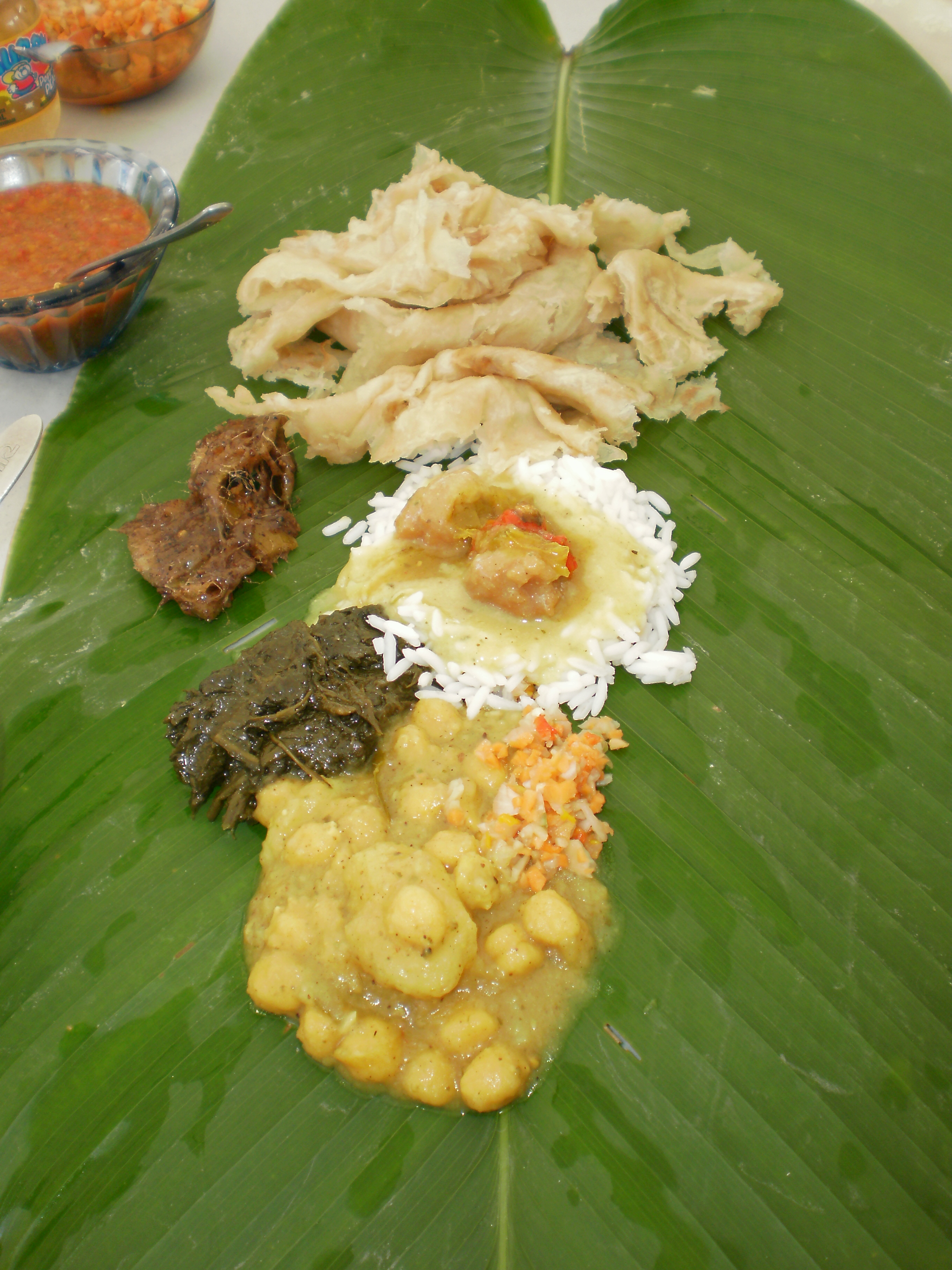
Diwali meal consisting of curry channa and aloo, curried mango, bhaji, karhi, rice, mother-in-law and paratha.

Special Christmas foods include appetisers like pastelles (called hallaca in Venezuela where they originated), pholourie, saheena, baiganee, kachori, and chicken or pork pies. Entrees include garlic ham (carne vinha-d'alhos, a Portuguese dish), baked ham, turkey or chicken, macaroni pie, fish pie and garlic roasted potatoes. As well as grilled or barbecued meats, corn, pigeon peas and Christmas (i.e. Spanish or festive) rice. Also enjoyed are fried rice, chow mein, lo mein, roasted chinese chicken, curried meat and vegetables and roti . Desserts include fruitcake, blackcake (rum cake), sweet bread, cassava pone, coconut drops and sponge cake. Along with chocolate cake, dundee cake, raisin/currants roll, khurma, and gulab jamun. Drinks include coconut water, ginger beer, ponche crema, egg nog, cocoa tea, and sorrel.

Traditional Diwali and other Hindu festivals and prayers foods include appetizers such as pholourie, saheena, baiganee, bara, and kachori. Main dishes include roti (most commonly dalpuri and paratha) and karhi and rice served with condiments such as achar or anchar, kuchela, mother-in-law (pickled vegetables), pepper sauce, and dishes such as curried mango, bhaji (dasheen bush or any spinach), pumpkin or kohra tarkari (pumpkin), curry channa and aloo (chickpeas and potatoes), fried or curried baigan (eggplant), fried or curried bodi (long beans), fried or curried seim (hyacinth beans), curry eddoes, curry chataigne or katahar (breadnut), and other tarkaries (vegetarian curries). Desserts include mohan bhog (parsad), lapsi and suhari, burfi, khurma, gulab jamun, pera, rasgulla, batasa, gujiya, gulgula, roat, kheer (sweet rice), laddu, and jalebi. It is traditionally served on a sohari (Calathea lutea) leaf.

Special Eid, Hosay, and other Muslim festival foods include curry goat, curry channa and aloo, sawine, burfi, rasgulla, sirnee, maleeda, halwa, and baklawa.

== Sweets ==
Popular local sweets include cassava or coconut pone, stewed guavas, sweetbread and paw paw balls. Common Indian sweets and desserts include kheer (sweet rice or meetha bhat), sawiyan, khurma, gulab jamoon, laddu, jalebi, halwa, mohan bhog (parsad) and lapsi. Indian sweets like rasgula, gulgula, rasmalai, pera, modak, gujiya and burfi are also popular.

== Beverages ==
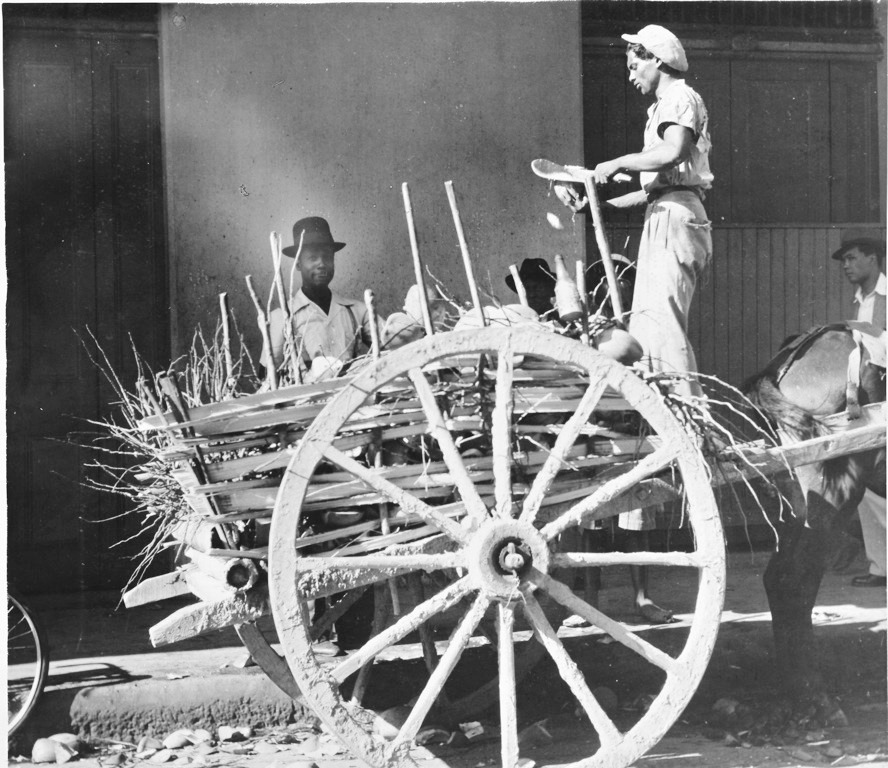
Coconut water vendor, Port of Spain, 1950s

There are many popular beverages native to the twin island nation. As in local soft drinks [sodas] (Chubby's, Busta, LLB (Lemon Lime and Bitters), Solo, Peardrax,), maltas, shandies, citrus juices and ginger beers.

Along with sorrel and mauby juices, peanut, seamoss, barbadine, soursop, beetroot and papaya (paw paw) punches.

Carib and Stag beers are very popular local lager beers. There is also Carib Light and Carib Shandys, which come in a variety of flavours.

Coconut water and sugarcane juice can be found throughout the island. Rum was invented in the Caribbean, therefore Trinidad and Tobago boasts rum shops all over the island, serving local favourites such as ponche-de-crème, puncheon rum, and home-made wines from local fruits. Homemade alcohol is popular also. Bitters (especially the one made by House of Angostura) is also popular.

Pacro water is a seafood-based beverage made from boiling various chiton mollusks, such as chiton tuberculatus but also has other culinary uses, such as in broths for soup. The beverage has a reputation as an aphrodisiac, as well as having other therapeutic properties. Pacro water can sometimes be found at festivals or public celebrations.

== Fruits ==
Fruits available in Trinidad include mangoes, breadfruit, sorrel (roselle), passion fruit, watermelon, sapodilla (Manilkara zapota), pommerac (Syzygium malaccense), guavas, pommecythère (Spondias dulcis), caimite (star apple), abiu, five fingers (carambola), cherries, avocado and pawpaw (papaya). Along with the chenette (Melicoccus bijugatus), pineapples, oranges, portugal (tangerines), plums, bananas, barbadine, balatá, soursop, cashews, tamarind, ceres (Flacourtia indica), pois doux, cocorite (Attalea maripa), gru-gru-beff (Acrocomia aculeata), fat-pork (Chrysobalanus icaco), pears, and coconuts.

Many fruits available in Trinidad and Tobago are commonly used in a savory and usually spicy delicacy broadly referred to as "chow". The main ingredients of chow are usually: the fruit of choice, culantro (bandhaniya), pepper (powdered, sauce or natural form), salt and sometimes garlic and vinegar. Traditionally, the most popular fruits for chow have been mangoes, pommeracs, pommecythère, cucumbers, tomatoes, portugals, sour oranges, salted prunes, cherries, pineapples, green apples, pears, and plums. The fruits are "seasoned" by the rest of the base ingredients and larger fruits (like mango and pineapple) are usually cut up into bite-sized pieces.

== See also ==
- Caribbean cuisine
- Caribbean Chinese cuisine
