= Ground provisions =

West Indian food staples

Ground provisions is the term used in West Indian nations to describe a number of traditional root vegetable staples such as yams, sweet potatoes, dasheen root (taro), eddoes and cassava. They are often cooked and served as a side dish in local cuisine. Caribbean recipes will often simply call for ground provisions rather than specify specific vegetables.

== Origins ==
Cassava, sweet potatoes, and maize derived from the aboriginal agriculture of the Amerindians. Dasheen, also known as taro, blue food and kalo, arrived to the Caribbean aboard Trans-Atlantic slave ships. Provision grounds, small tracts of the least desired land, were allocated by planters to slaves so that they could grow their own food for their survival. The planters conceded to this arrangement to avoid absorbing the expense of feeding the slaves they imported to power their sugar plantations.

== Production ==
In addition to large-scale farming, ground provisions are a part of forest gardens as an adaptation of African compound farming.

== Common use ==
In Trinidad, It is usually accompanied by stewed meat, fish or chicken or with buljol. Callaloo, the national dish of Trinidad and Tobago and Dominica, is made using leaves of the dasheen tuber. Ground provisions are seen as a healthier starch choice because they are an unprocessed carbohydrate, but competes with popular starches such as rice.

Ground provisions are a common traditional food, but see growing interest due to farm-to-table movements and culinary tourism. Ground provisions are also a source of gluten-free flours produced for the international market.

== Economy and trade ==
Production and consumption of ground provisions is common to all Caribbean Development and Cooperation Committee (CDCC) countries and production in these countries is of relative significance. Trade in ground provisions, with the exception of potatoes, which have seen major imports from Holland, takes place among CARICOM countries. Leeward Islands and Jamaica have some export of ground provisions to the United Kingdom. Dominican Republic and Cuba, on the other hand, export some ground provisions in the area, such as Curaçao, and some of the CARICOM countries, as it happens with Cuban exports of potatoes (to Trinidad and Tobago and Barbados). The traditional line of trade that has remained over the years are the occasional exports to the United Kingdom. In the area of production, the most organised effort in expanding production is made in Cuba, where research and development which is well-linked with production. Cuba also sells seeds of some of its improved produce. There are no business associations for producing or marketing ground provisions in the Caribbean except for Cuba.

=== Jamaica ===
Jamaica's agricultural exports are concentrated on ground provisions, notably sweet potatoes and plantains. In the 1970s, there were efforts to expand the production of ground provisions, and by 1980 made up to 80% of Jamaica's total agricultural exports. The Ministry of Industry, Commerce, Agriculture and Fisheries' Production Incentive Programme targeted dasheen a strategic crop for development, with an objective of expanding local hectares under cultivation from 21 to 30, resulting in a four per cent increase in production during the 2019-2020 year. Sweet potatoes, yams, dasheens and tannias are being exported particularly to the United Kingdom and Canada.

=== St. Vincent ===
St. Vincent's exports of agricultural produce consist mainly of ground provisions and carrots. Most of these produce go to Trinidad and Tobago, in particular, eddoes, tannias and yams.

=== Suriname ===
In 1980, the government of Suriname prohibited the export of some ground provisions because of shortages in the local supply.

=== Trinidad and Tobago ===
Trinidad and Tobago is a net importer of food supply, importing large supplies of ground provisions, potatoes in particular. In 2020, Tobago offered cash incentives for farmers to encourage food security during Covid-19, including sweet potatoes and cassava.

== See also ==
- Fufu
- Cooking banana
- Caribbean cuisine
- Indigenous cuisine of the Americas
