= Lapsi =

Lapsi may refer to:

- Lapsi (Christianity), Christian apostates during the Decian persecutions
- Lapsi (fruit), a fruit from Nepal
- Laapsi, a sweet dish from Northern India made with broken wheat
- The Los Angeles Psychoanalytic Society and Institute, a psychoanalytic organization now known as the New Center for Psychoanalysis
