= Saheena =

Trinidadian snack

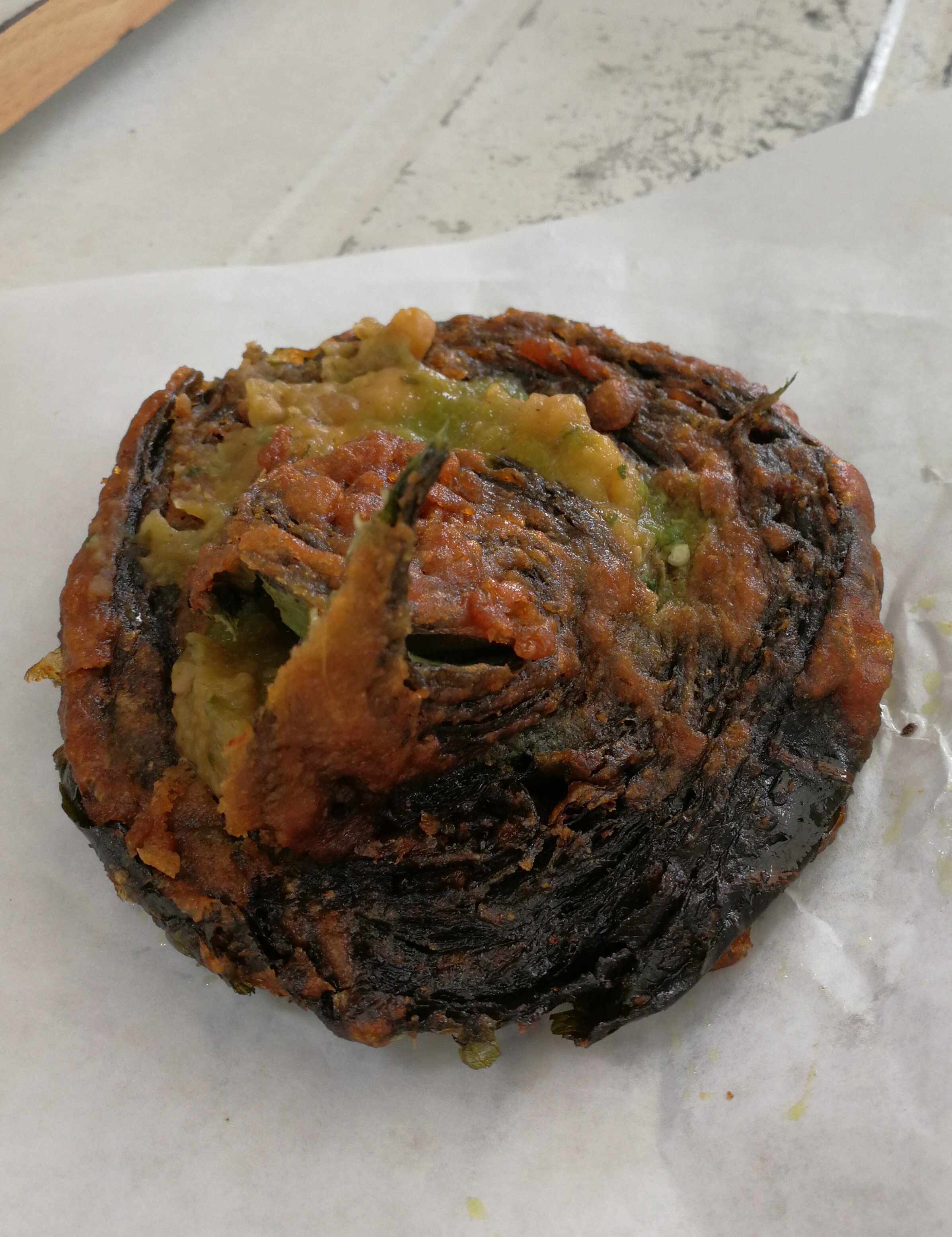
- Roll-up saheena
- Alternative names: Sahina, sahiena
- Type: Snack
- Place of origin: Trinidad and Tobago
- Associated cuisine: Trinidad and Tobago cuisine
- Serving temperature: Hot
- Main ingredients: dasheen or spinach leaves and ground split peas paste
- Variations: Roll-up saheena, chip-up saheena, sahlourie (saheena pholourie)
- Similar dishes: Patrode, saina (Fiji), sehna (Suriname)

Saheena (also spelled sahina or sahiena,) is a street food and snack in the cuisine of Trinidad and Tobago.

== History and etymology ==
The dish traces back to indentured labourers from South Asia. After the end of slavery in Trinidad in 1840, the plantations—which dominated the island's economy at the time—needed a cheap substitute for slave labour. It was found in contract workers from British India. From 1840 on, workers were recruited in large numbers who had to commit themselves for five years minimum and were promised five acres of land as a reward. Until World War I, 145,000 workers, mainly East Indian, migrated to Trinidad, adapting their recipes to the supply of ingredients found in their new home. According to the Dictionary of the English/Creole of Trinidad & Tobago, the term saheena derives from the Bihari group of languages and means delicious or savoury. The term saheena is a collective noun and is used in singular and plural form.

Saheena is an ordinary dish and is prepared at home as well as bought from takeaway stores and stalls. It is also served as a side dish on festive occasions such as Divali or Eid. Mobile breakfast stalls that sell doubles, the most popular breakfast in Trinidad, often also sell saheena. While many dishes from Indo-Trinidadian cuisine are popular on other Caribbean islands, saheena remains a dish prevalent in Trinidad only.

== Preparation ==
Two common preparation methods for saheena exist: a more complex one ("roll-up") and a simple one ("cut-up"). Both are based on the same ingredients, but since the share of the main ingredient and the preparation method differ, the two types differ significantly in taste and texture. For both variants, a creamy dough is prepared from ground chickpeas or chickpea flour, flour, garlic, onions, spices, and water. The most common spice for the dough is turmeric, with cumin and black pepper also being used frequently. To round out the taste, green seasoning, a popular herb mixture based on culantro, can be added.

For the more complex preparation method of "roll-up", dasheen leaves and dough are layered by spreading dough onto the upper side of the current leaf. The stacked leaves are rolled up like roulades, fixated, and then either steamed or cooked in a waterproof bag. The rolls are then cut into slices, which are turned in spiced flour and dough and finally baked through. The dough for frying needs to be more chewy than the dough mixed with the leaves. The roll-up method is mostly used for formal celebrations outdoors.

For the easier preparation method of "cut-up", dasheen leaves are cut into small pieces, mixed with dough, formed into palm-sized cakelets, and fried in oil or fat. The cut-up method is the one mainly found at food stalls. An even simpler preparation method for cut-up saheena involves mixing minced dasheen leaves, water, and industrial pholourie dough and frying it in portions.

Saheena is served with kuchela, a chutney, or other condiments. Chutneys are extremely common in Trinidadian cuisine; the predominant flavours are mango and tamarind. In addition to condiments, chili sauces are used on saheena. A common eating method for cut-up saheena is to cut it up and coat the insides with condiments. In Trinidad, dasheen leaves are available at markets rather than in supermarkets, so they are less readily available due to limited opening times. If unavailable, they are often exchanged for spinach, which tastes similar, or for collard. When touched, dasheen leaves cause an itching of the hands. To prevent this, hands are slathered with a little bit of lime juice, or the leaves are washed with a bit of lime juice.

Leftovers of saheena can be used in a dish called saheena talkari. Slices of roll-up saheena are cooked in a curry sauce and served with the sauce.
