= Buljol =

Trinidadian and Tobagonian salad

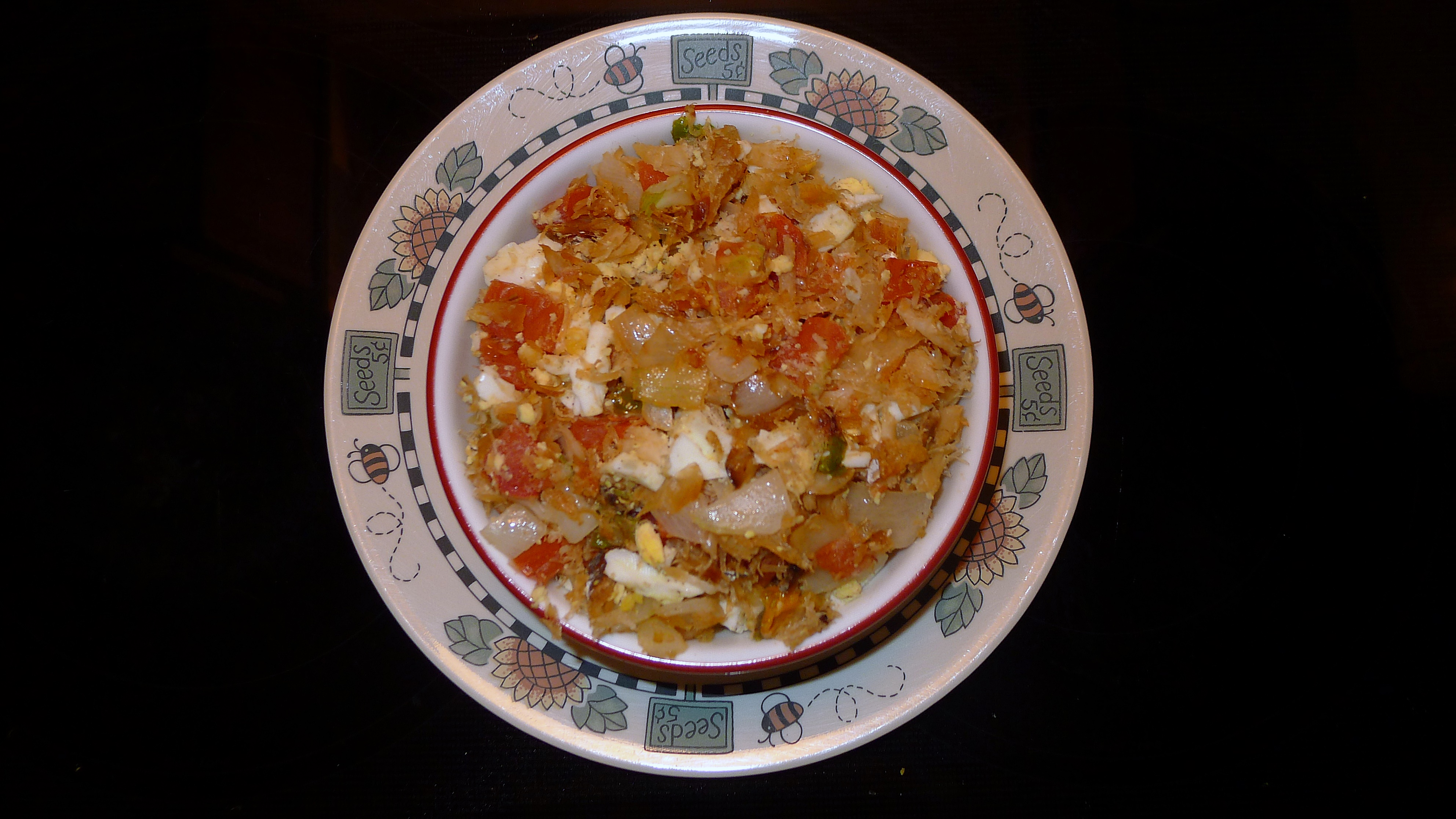
- Buljol with boiled eggs
- Type: salad
- Place of origin: Trinidad and Tobago
- Associated cuisine: Trinidad and Tobago cuisine
- Serving temperature: cold
- Main ingredients: codfish

Buljol is a salad dish of the cuisine of Trinidad and Tobago. It consists of chopped salted cod, tomatoes and chilies. The name is of French origin. 18th-century colonial power Spain launched the cédula de población in 1783, an edict that successfully promoted the settling of French (i.e. likewise Catholic) planters in Trinidad who quickly set the population majority. The name is a combination of the French words brulé ('burnt') and gueule ('muzzle'), which was changed into bu'n jaw in Trinidad's 19th century patois and finally morphed into buljol. The name does not relate to the temperature of the dish (it is served cold) but to its spiciness, caused by the added hot pepper.

In colonial times buljol was considered a poor man's food, but nowadays it is used as a breakfast ingredient, being eaten with toast or fried bake. From Trinidad the use of buljol has spread to other Caribbean islands and Trinidadian communities in English-speaking countries such as Canada, Great Britain and the United States.

The skin and bones of the salted cod are removed, then it is cooked or repeatedly soused with cooking water to remove as much of the salt as possible. The fish is then shredded and mixed with chopped tomatoes and chilies. Additional ingredients are added to taste with onions, bell peppers and olive oil being prevalent, but also garlic, hard-boiled eggs, lemon juice, lettuce, white wine and various herbs are used. Instead of codfish sometimes pollock or hake are used.

== See also ==
- Bacalhau
- List of salads
