= Kuchela (relish) =

Trinidadian relish

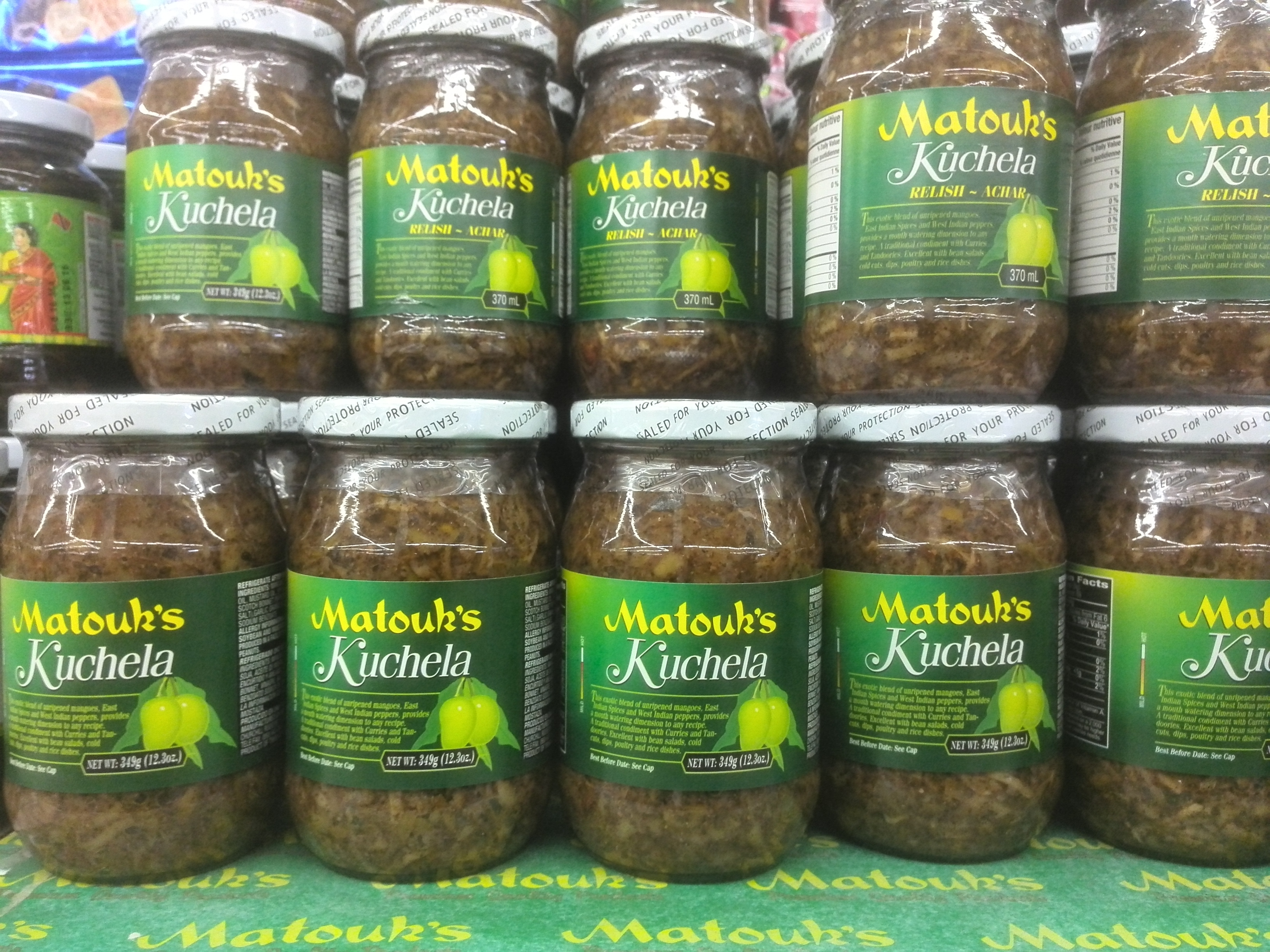
- Kuchela in a supermarket
- Alternative names: Kucheela, kuchila
- Type: Relish
- Place of origin: Trinidad and Tobago
- Associated cuisine: Trinidad and Tobago cuisine
- Main ingredients: mango
- Ingredients generally used: amchar massala, pepper, and mustard oil

Kuchela, also spelled kucheela, occasionally also kuchila, is a hot relish of the Trinidadian cuisine.

The main ingredient of kuchela is the pulp of unripe mangoes that has been grated and thoroughly strained or dried. Afterwards, it is mixed with amchar massala and various additional spices. Amchar massala is a blend of spices containing cilantro seeds, cumin, fennel seeds, fenugreek seeds, brown mustard seeds, and peppercorns. The hotness level is regulated by adding either fresh peppers (Scotch bonnets and "congo peppers" (habaneros) being common) or a hot sauce. The relish is then seasoned to taste with salt, sugar and garlic; vinegar is also common. By adding oil, usually mustard oil, the texture can be adjusted. As a relish, kuchela is used in many ways—for example, as a side dish or condiment to curries or pelau, or as a topping for doubles.

Kuchela, as well as the contained spice blend amchar masala, has Indian roots. Roughly 40% of all Trinidadians are of Indian descent. Their ancestors came to Trinidad as indentured labourers from the mid 19th century on and brought with them their traditional recipes of their home provinces, which were subsequently adapted to the local offer of provisions. Nowadays kuchela (and amchar masala) are available as industrially produced, packaged goods in supermarkets. In neighboring Guyana, which as a former British colony shares parts of its colonial heritage with Trinidad, exists a similar relish called "mango achar".

== See also ==
- List of condiments
