= Bake and shark =

Traditional Trinidadian fast food dish

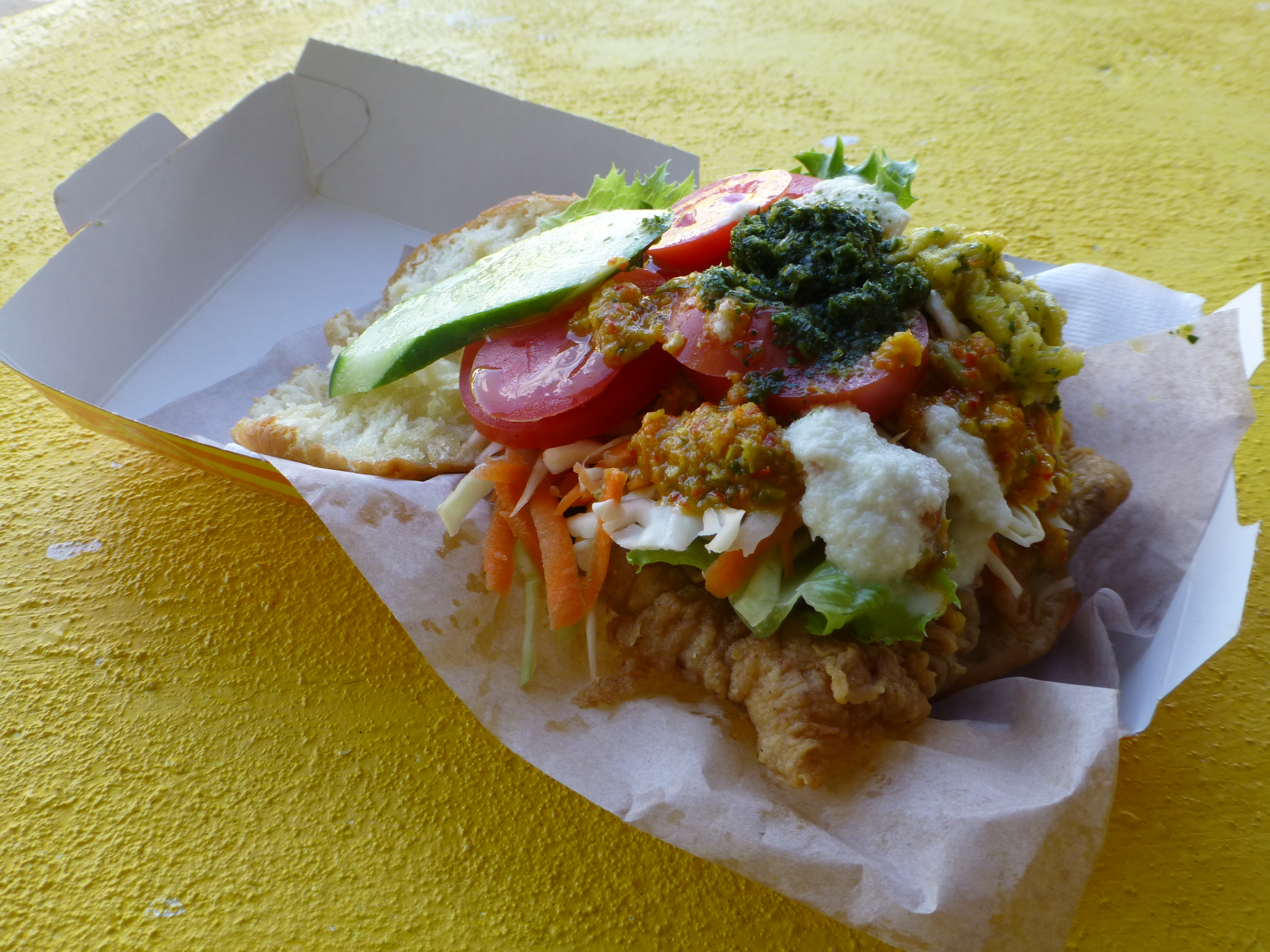
Bake and shark

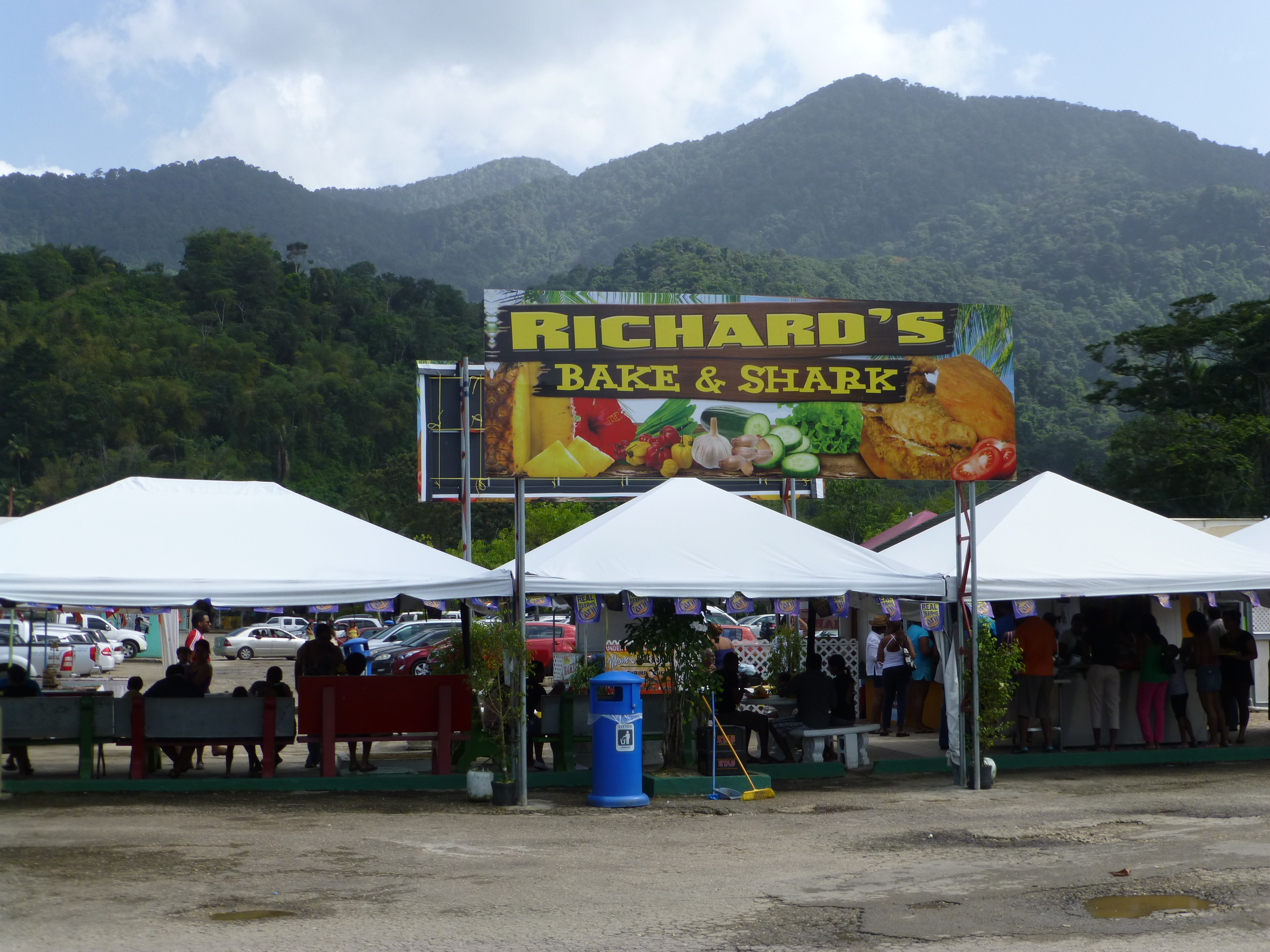
Bake and shark hut at Maracas Beach, Trinidad

Bake and shark is a traditional fast food dish of Trinidadian cuisine prepared using fried flatbread, shark meat and additional ingredients. It is a classic street food dish that is sold at a multitude of food stalls and cookshops all over Trinidad and Tobago.

== Preparation ==
It consists of a fried flatbread ("bake") filled with fried pieces of shark meat and various other ingredients and sauces. Before frying, the shark meat is either seasoned with a herb blend and breaded, or marinated in a mix of lemon juice, onion, garlic, thyme and Capsicum chinense. Popular additional ingredients are lettuce, coleslaw, tomatoes or pineapple; liquid condiments commonly used are mustard, ketchup, garlic sauce, chili sauce or a sauce made from culantro. In Trinidad, bake and shark is widely associated with Maracas beach on the Northern coast as it features a multitude of bake and shark stands, and the needed shark is caught in the offshore surf.

== Environmental problems ==
As apex predators, sharks are of high importance for the ocean as an ecosystem. Through overfishing, many shark species are endangered. Apart from ethical problems this also causes economic problems as the demand for shark meat in Trinidad cannot be covered any more. Often catfish and ray are used as substitutes and are declared incorrectly. In return, bake and shark stalls sometimes advertise for using shark meat instead of cheaper alternatives.
