= Patrode =

Vegetarian dish from India

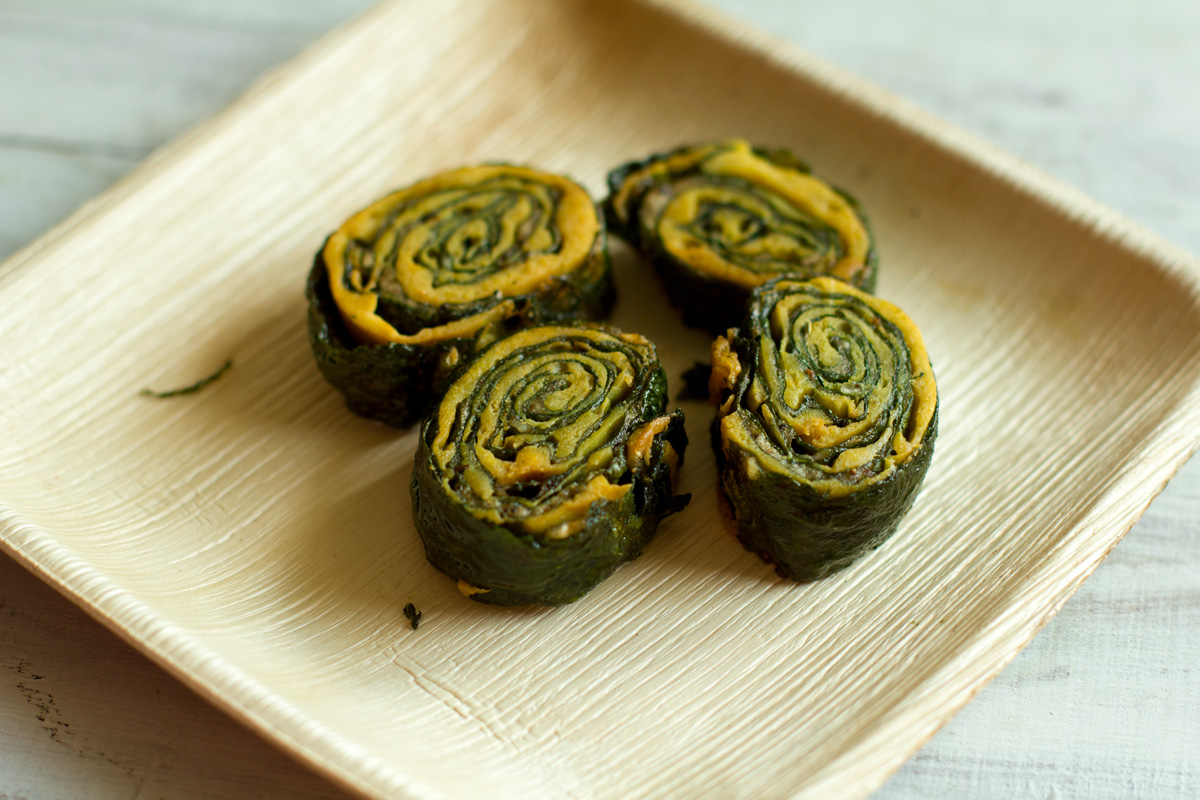
- Patrode
- Alternative names: Patrodo, patra and patrodu
- Type: Dumplings
- Place of origin: India
- Region or state: Karnataka, Konkan, Kerala, Tamil Nadu, Maharashtra, Gujarat, Himachal Pradesh, Uttar Pradesh, Uttarakhand
- Created by: Ancient food with traditional speciality guaranteed status
- Main ingredients: Gram flour, colocasia leaves
- Variations: Patrode
- Similar dishes: Saheena

Patrode also known as patrodo, patra, or patrodu, is a steamed vegetarian dish made from colocasia leaves (chevu in Tulu, taro, kesuve or arbi) in various parts of India.

== Etymology ==
Patra in Sanskrit and its derivative languages means leaf and vade/vado means dumpling. In Maharashtra, it is called alu vadi. It is also known as rikvach in Uttar Pradesh and Bihar, patrodé in Karnataka, patrodu in Himachal Pradesh, patra in Gujarat, chembila appam in Kerala, alu vadi in Maharashtra (especially in Malvan) and Goa, Patod in Uttarakhand and saina in Fiji, and saheena in Trinidad and Tobago. It is a primary cuisine for the Konkani-speaking Gaud Saraswat Brahmin community (patrodu).

== Preparation ==
It is made from colocasia leaves (chevu in Tulu, taro, kesuve or arbi) stuffed with gram or rice flour and flavourings such as spices, tamarind, and jaggery (raw sugar). Care must be taken during preparation to ensure that the leaves are adequately cooked. Colocasia esculenta is a member of the Araceae group of plants (including caladium, philodendron, anthurium, alocasia, peace lily, etc.), which are all known to contain irritating calcium oxalate crystals. Only through proper duration of steaming/cooking are they palatable. Mild side effects are described as feeling similar to “swallowing sand” or having “a mouthful of glass”, sensations which can be accompanied by nausea, side aches and potential kidney stone formation, in the worst-case scenarios. Many other plants with thick, glossy foliage contain these same oxalate crystals as a natural defense against animals, albeit in varying concentrations, such as Swiss chard, and there are no issues for the consumer. The vast majority of people do not suffer from any issues, as most chefs prepare the taro leaves correctly.

== Origin ==
Patrode is a unique dish originally made from colocasia leaves in Gujarat, Himachal Pradesh, Karnataka, Maharashtra, North Kerala where Taro or "Colocasia esculenta" is thought to be native plant of Southern India. Over time this dish has been adopted by various states in India.

== Traditional speciality guaranteed Status ==
In July 2021, it was identified as one of the traditional food recipes from the AYUSH system of medicine by the Union Ministry of AYUSH. According to the Ministry of AYUSH, iron-rich colocasia leaves help to improve hemoglobin levels. The leaves contain phenols, tannins, flavonoids, glycosides, and sterols, which help in reducing chronic inflammation such as rheumatoid arthritis. The leaves have significant amounts of vitamin C and beta-carotene.

== See also ==
- Enduri pitha
- List of steamed foods
