= Tarkari =

Vegetable dishes

Vegetable tarkari
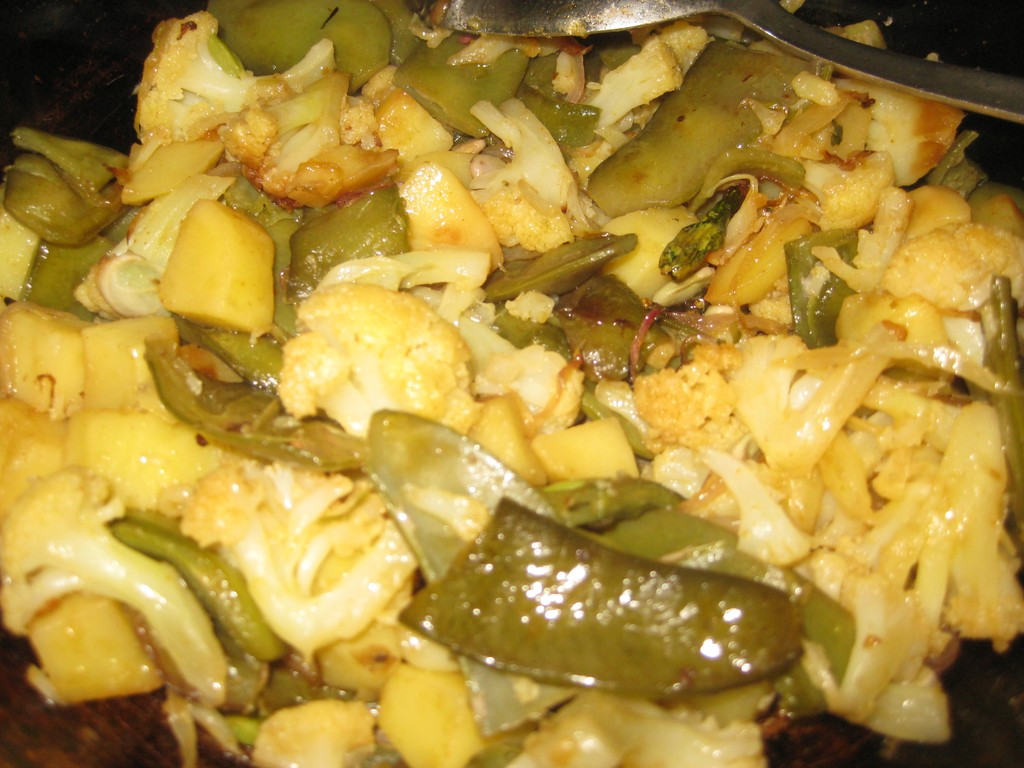
- Vegetable tarkari
- Alternative names: Talkari
- Type: Curry
- Place of origin: Indian subcontinent
- Region or state: South Asia
- Associated cuisine: India, Bangladesh, Pakistan, Nepal, Trinidad and Tobago
- Main ingredients: Vegetables

Tarkari is a name given to a wide range of side vegetable dishes found commonly in the Indian subcontinent, notably in India, Bangladesh, Pakistan and Nepal. Preparation methods for tarkaris range from simple to complex. Some of these dishes are also sometimes called curries and are made from vegetables that are popular in large parts of the Indian subcontinent, Mauritius, Fiji, South Africa, and the Caribbean.

== Gallery ==
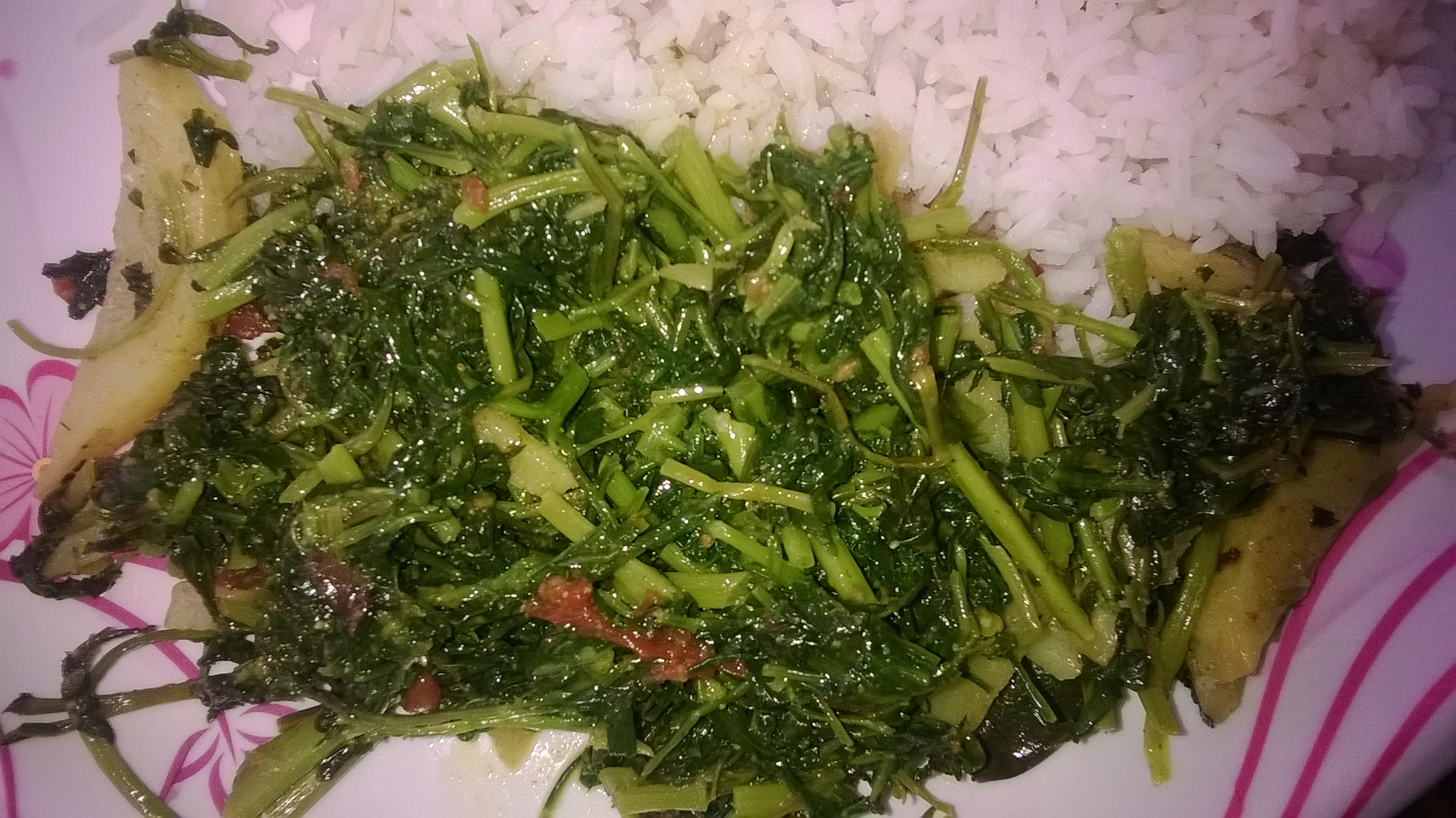
Nepalese garden cress tarkari

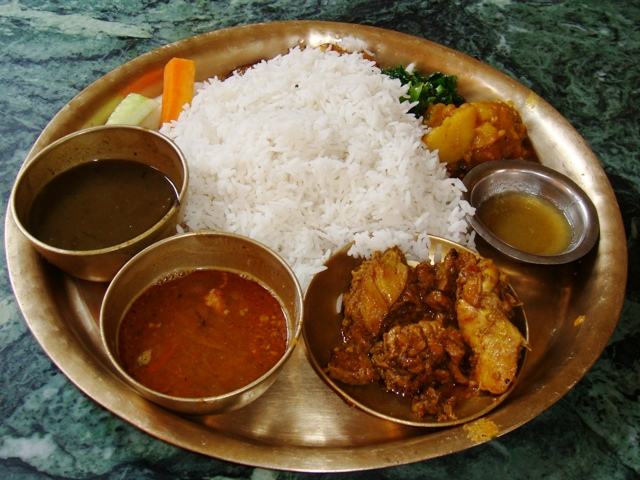
Nepalese dal bhat tarkari

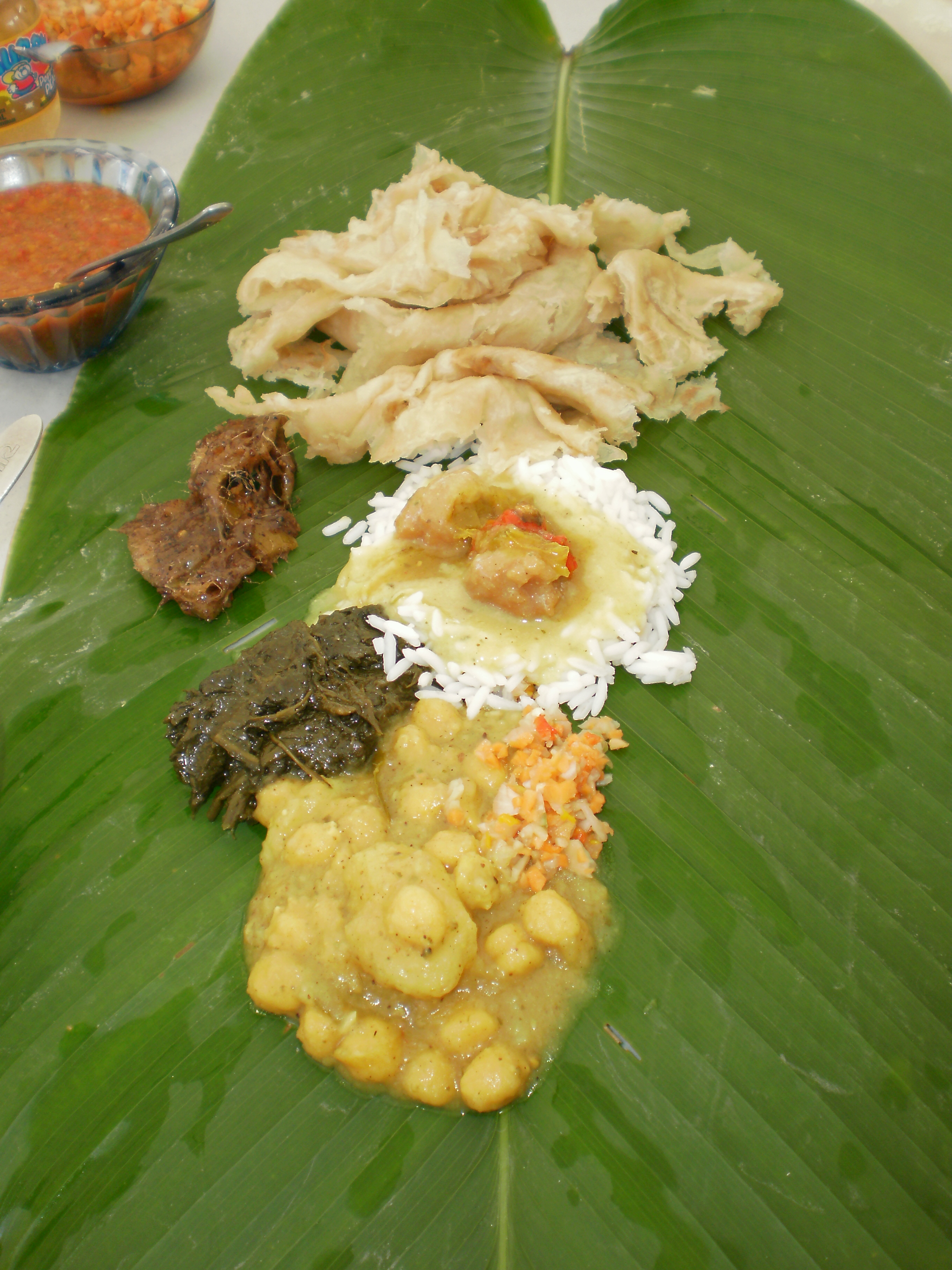
Diwali meal consisting of several vegetarian tarkaris with karhi, rice, mother-in-law pepper, and paratha

== See also ==
- List of vegetable dishes
