= Pholourie =

Fried, spiced dough balls

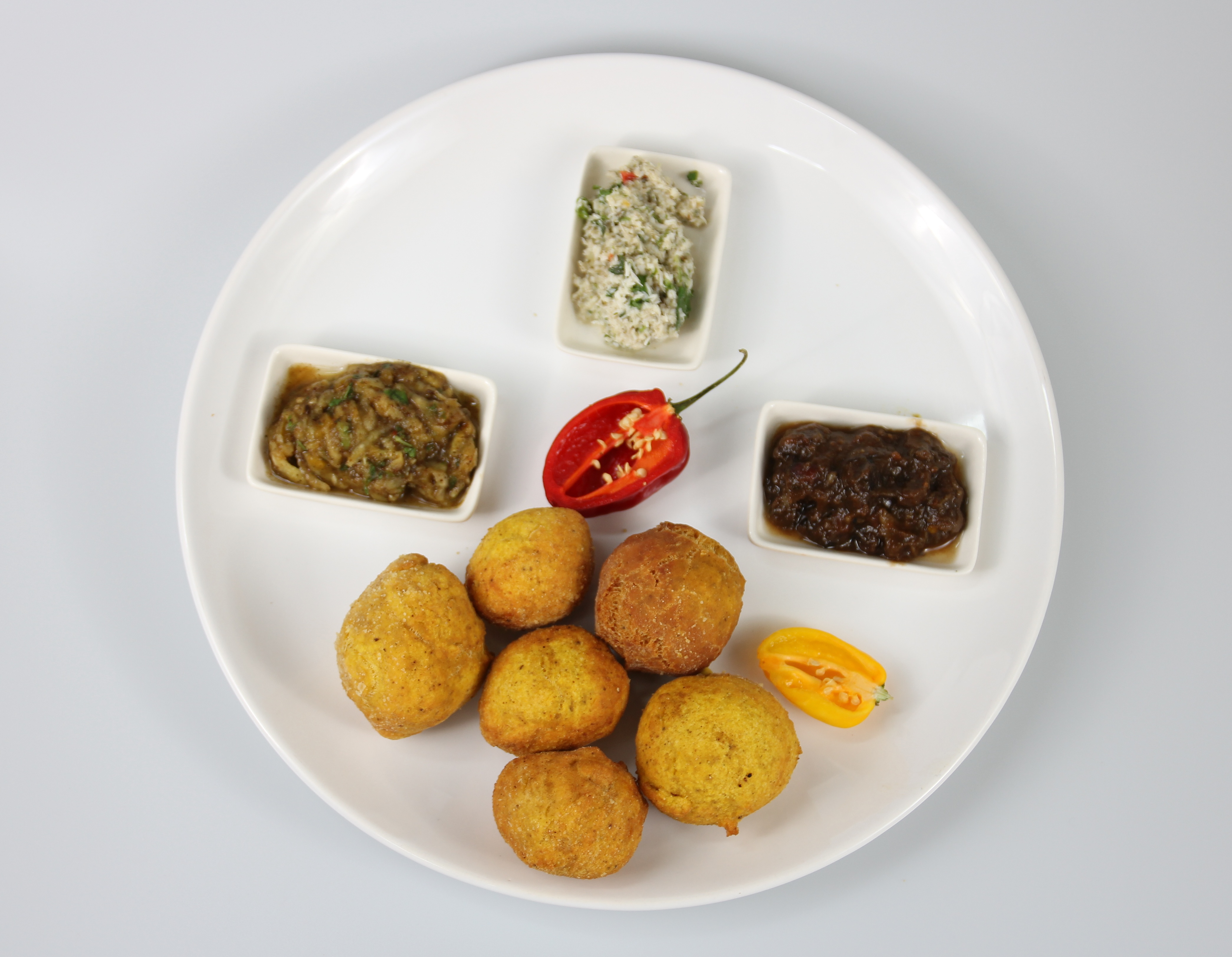
- Pholourie with mango, coconut and tamarind chutneys
- Alternative names: Phulourie, phoulourie, phulauri
- Type: Fritter
- Place of origin: Trinidad and Tobago, Guyana, Suriname
- Associated cuisine: Trinidad and Tobago cuisine, Guyanese cuisine, Surinamese cuisine
- Serving temperature: Warm
- Main ingredients: Flour and split pea powder
- Variations: Sahlourie (saheena pholourie)
- Similar dishes: Pakora

Pholourie, also spelled phulourie or phoulourie, is an snack commonly eaten in Trinidad and Tobago, Guyana, Suriname and other parts of the Caribbean. It consists of fried, spiced split pea and flour dough balls that are served with a chutney.

== Overview ==
The dough is made up of flour, ground split peas, water, and spices. Depending on the recipe, culantro, garlic, pepper, turmeric, onions or cumin are used. Then dough balls the size of golf balls are formed and fried afterwards. The fried balls are usually served with a chutney to dip them in, usually tamarind or mango.

The dish was brought to Trinidad and Tobago, Guyana and Suriname by migrants from India. These Indians were recruited as indentured laborers after slavery had been abolished in the 19th century, and they brought their local recipes with them which they altered according to ingredients available in their new home. Over the decades, local taste slowly altered, leading to the Indian-based part of the Trinidadian cuisine known today. Pholourie is widely connected to the Holi festival celebrated by Trinidadian Hindus.

== In popular culture ==
One of Sundar Popo's most famous songs is Pholourie Bina Chutney Kaise Bani (transl. How can you have pholourie without the chutney?).
