= Puncheon rum =

Type of Caribbean rum

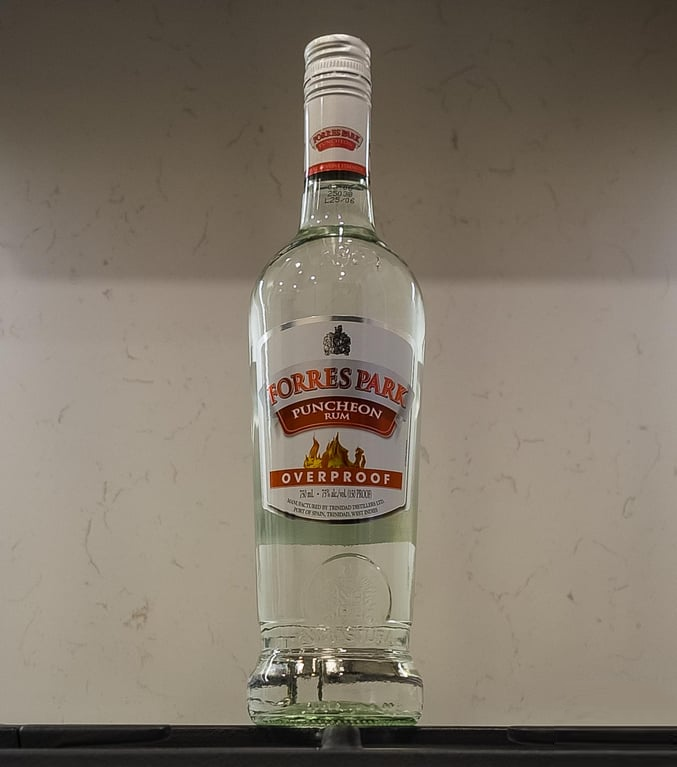
- A bottle of Forres Park Puncheon rum
- Type: Distilled beverage
- Origin: Trinidad and Tobago, Caribbean
- Introduced: 1930s
- Alcohol by volume: 75%
- Color: Clear
- Related products: rum, overproof rum

Puncheon rum (or puncheon) is a high proof heavy-type rum produced in Trinidad and Tobago. The name 'Puncheon' is derived from the giant wooden casks, known as 'puncheons' in which the rum was stored. Though puncheons have been used for centuries to store rum, the first "Puncheon rum" of the style was manufactured in the early 1930s by the Fernandes family. Today, three local brands, Forres Park, Caroni, and Stallion, produce Puncheon rum, bottled at 75% alcohol by volume. In Trinidad and Tobago, it is sometimes referred to as "firewater".

== History ==
Puncheon rum dates back to the early 1930s, when the Fernandes family acquired the Forres Park estate in Trinidad. The Fernandes family set up a distillery on the estate, and started distilling rum to sell as Vat-19, a gold rum. However, they also made additional rum for their own personal consumption, and for their estate workers. The rum was stored in massive wooden barrels called puncheons. However, the interest in this rum escaped the estate, and soon it was also produced for the market. It gained a stigma for being associated with hooligans, called "baa-johns", who regularly consumed it to demonstrate their toughness. In 1973, Angostura bought the Forres Park rum company from the Fernandes family.
