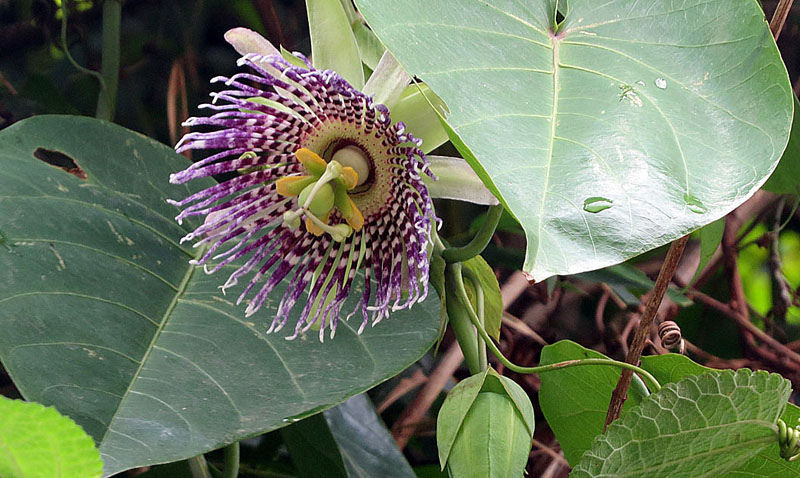
- Passiflora ligularis in flower
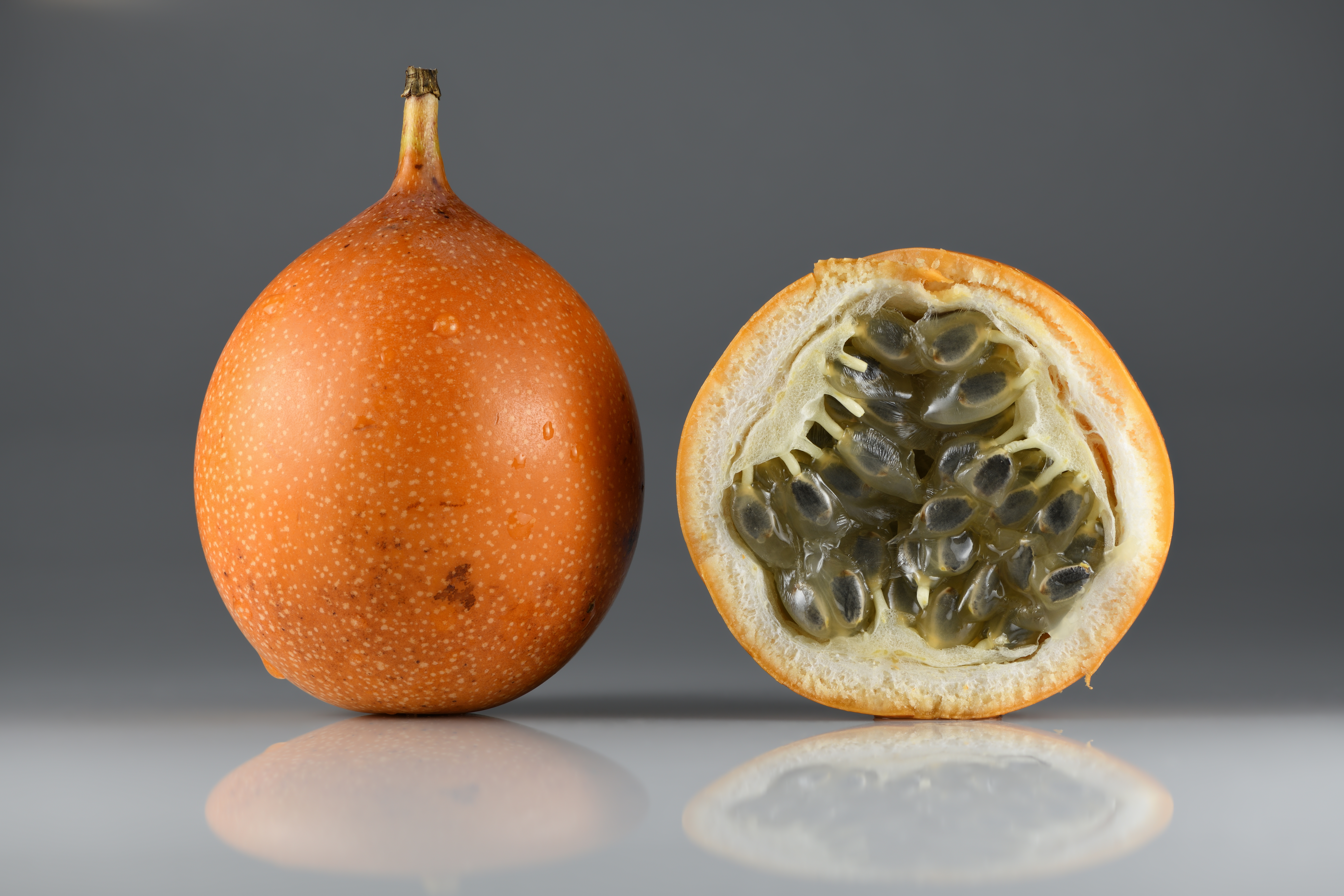
- Passiflora ligularis fruits

Scientific classification
- Kingdom: Plantae
- Clade: Tracheophytes
- Clade: Angiosperms
- Clade: Eudicots
- Clade: Rosids
- Order: Malpighiales
- Family: Passifloraceae
- Genus: Passiflora
- Species: P. ligularis

Binomial name
- Passiflora ligularis Juss.

= Passiflora ligularis =

Species of plant

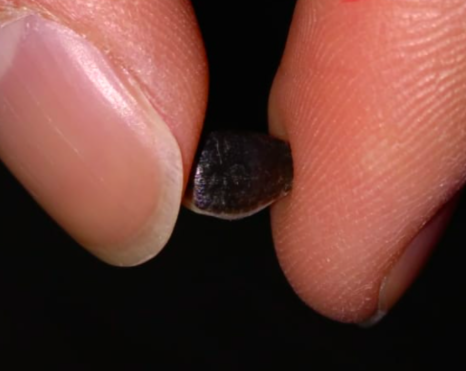
The seed of a sweet granadilla

Passiflora ligularis, the sweet granadilla, grenadia, or sugarfruit, is a plant species in the passionflower genus Passiflora, family Passifloraceae.

== Description ==
=== Plant ===
Passiflora ligularis is an evergreen climbing shrub, producing stems of up to 5 metres (16 ft 5 in) long. The stems scramble over the ground or clamber into the surrounding vegetation, attaching themselves by means of coiling tendrils. The leaves are ovate 8–22 centimetres (3.1–8.7 in) long and 6–17 cm (2.4–6.7 in) wide. The colour of the upper side is dark green and the underside green greyish. Younger leaves vary and can have a slight violet tone. The plant has shallow roots. The flower is 6–12 cm (2.4–4.7 in) in diameter with acute sepals, a green outside and a white inside. The petals are 3 cm (1.2 in) long and 1 cm (0.39 in) wide, and they are white or white with a slightly pink or violet colouring. It needs to be pollinated, which is usually done by bumblebees, honey bees and large wasps. However, strong winds can interfere with the pollination of the flower as well as cause branch breakage, dehydration and scarring on the fruits. The flower only flowers for a day and the pollen may not be viable in the early morning or late afternoon. The plant does not seem to be photoperiodic as it is able to flower around the whole year. However, if the daily average of sunlight is less than 8 hours the fruits can become a brownish colour. The flowers have an aromatic, sweet and musky smell.

=== Fruit ===
The fruit is initially green and becomes a yellowish orange with small white dots when ripe. It has a round shape with a tip ending in the stem. The fruit is between 6.5–8 cm (2.6–3.1 in) long and 5.1–7 cm (2.0–2.8 in) in diameter. The outer shell is hard and slippery and has soft padding on the interior to protect the seeds. There can be 250–300 seeds per fruit. These seeds are hard and black, surrounded by a gelatinous sphere of translucent pulp. The pulp is the edible part of the fruit and has a soft sweet taste. It is very aromatic and contains vitamins A, C, and K, phosphorus, iron, and calcium.

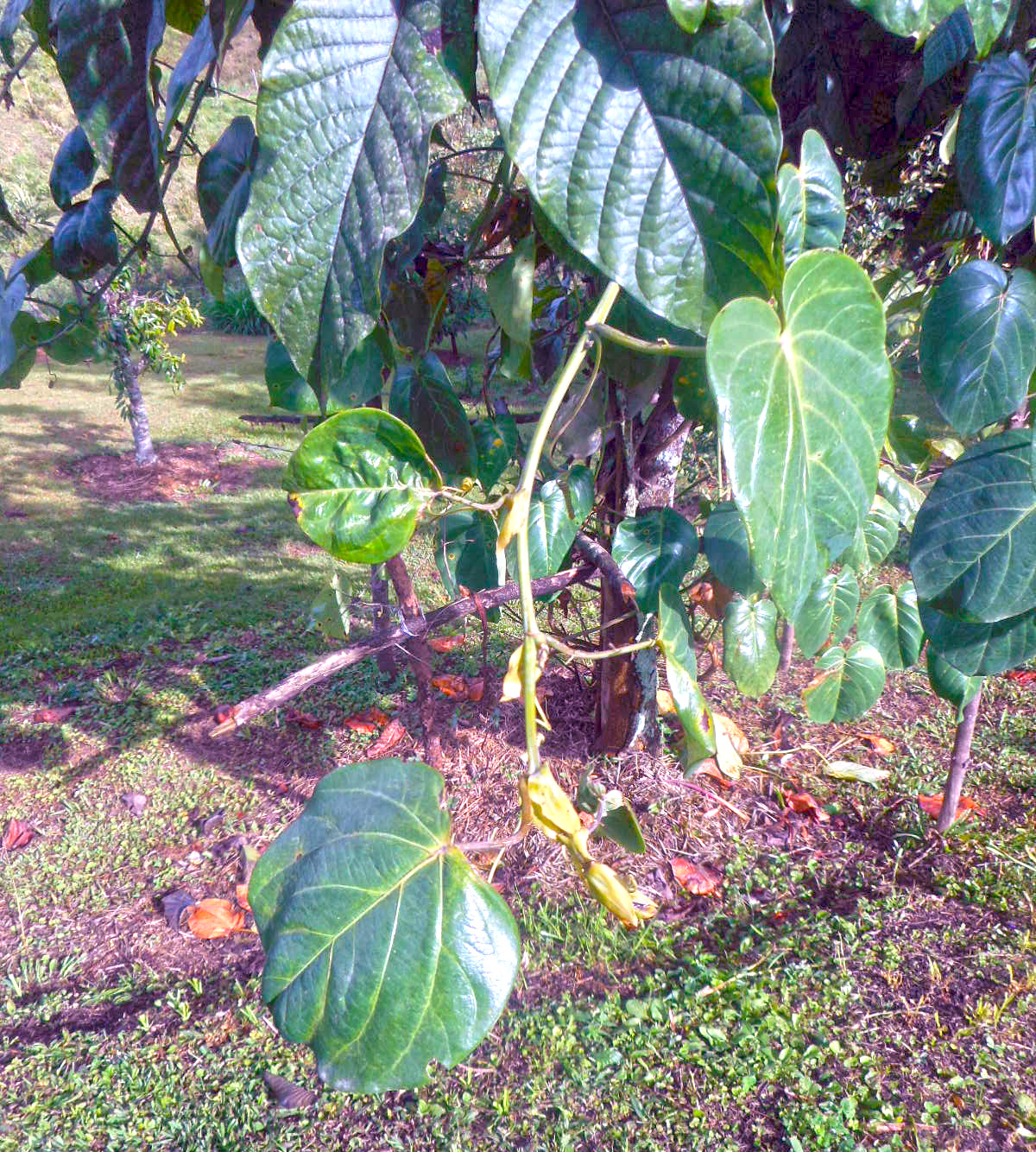
Leaves

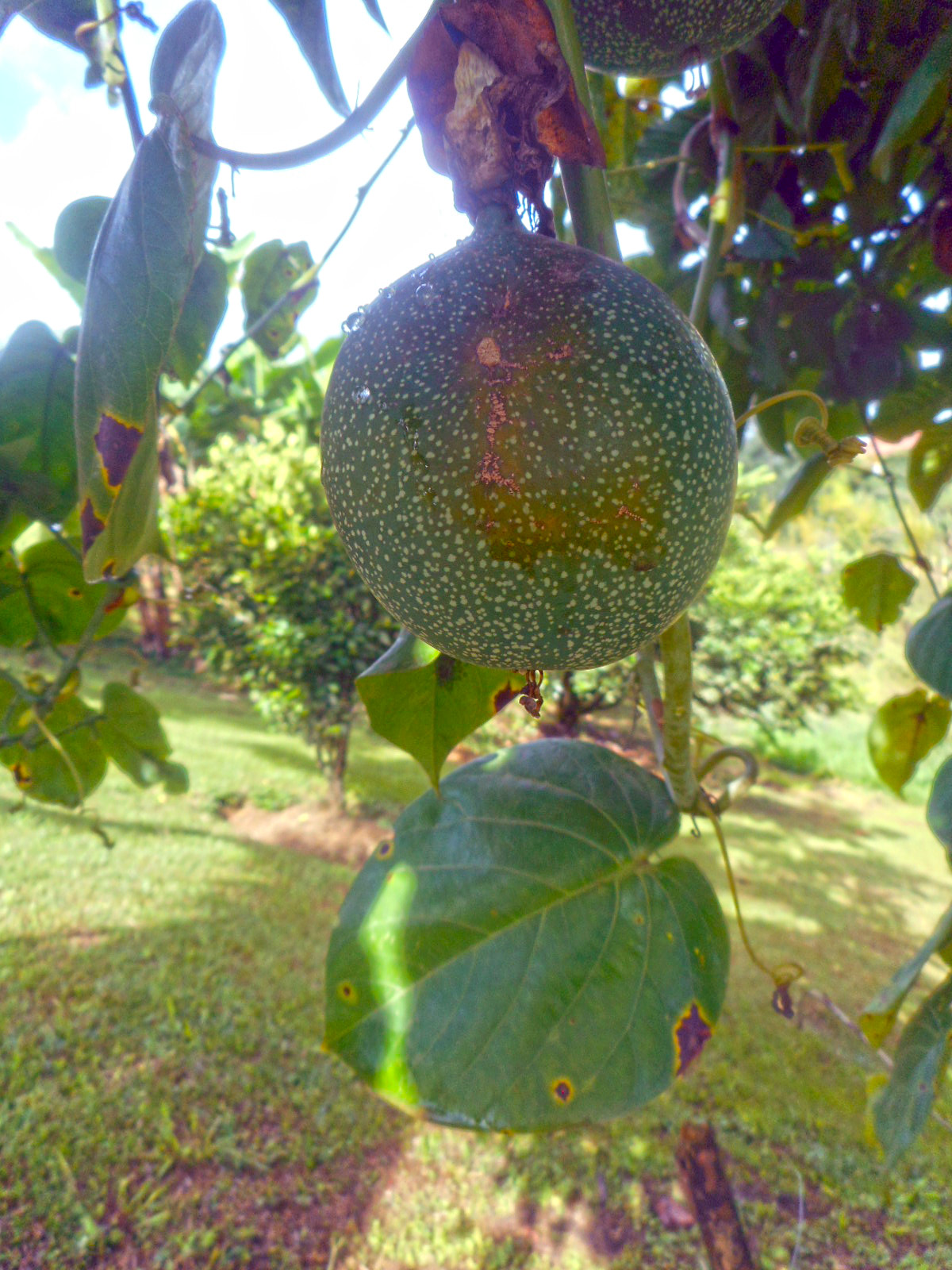
Green fruit

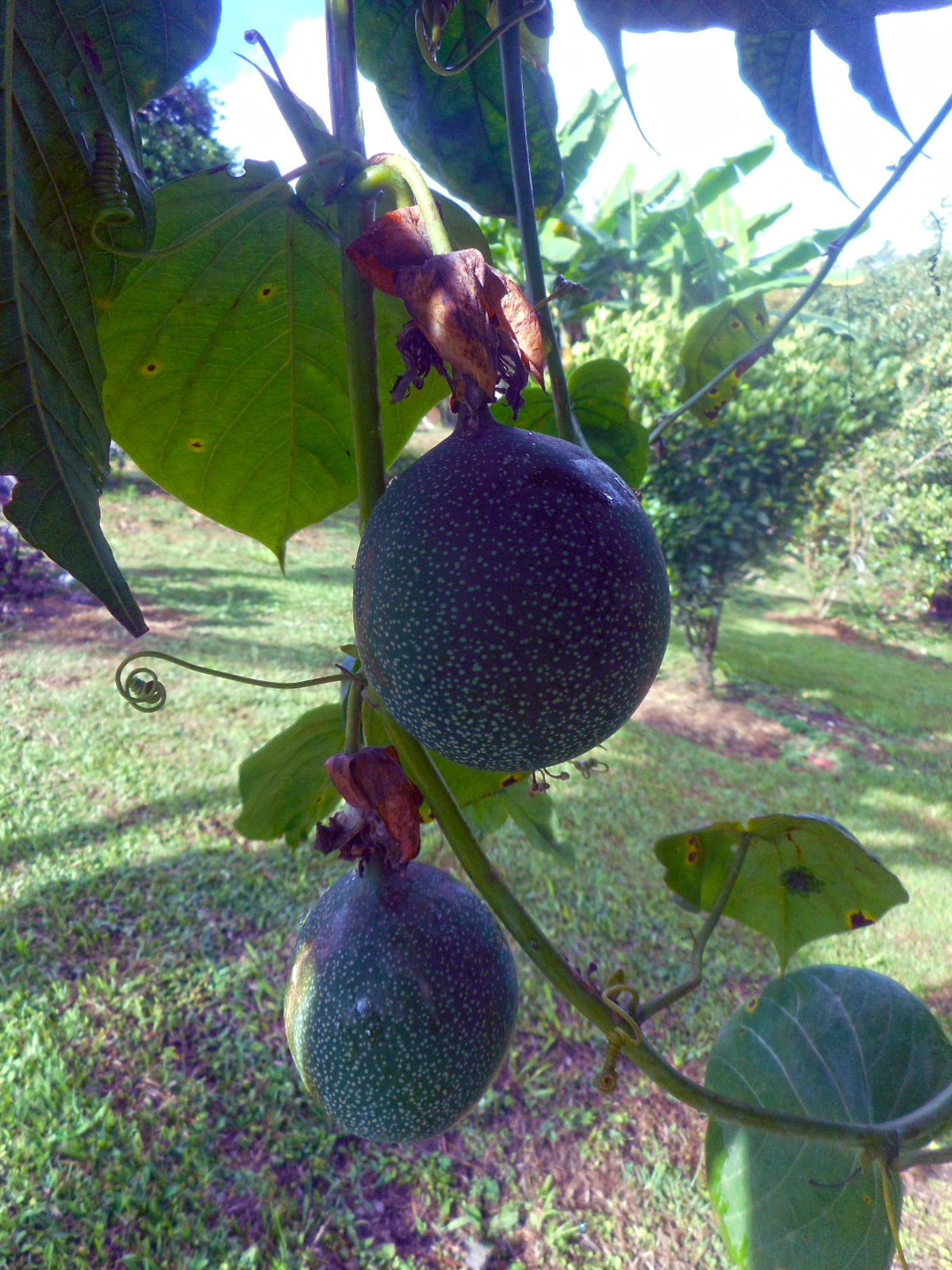
Fruits hanging from vine

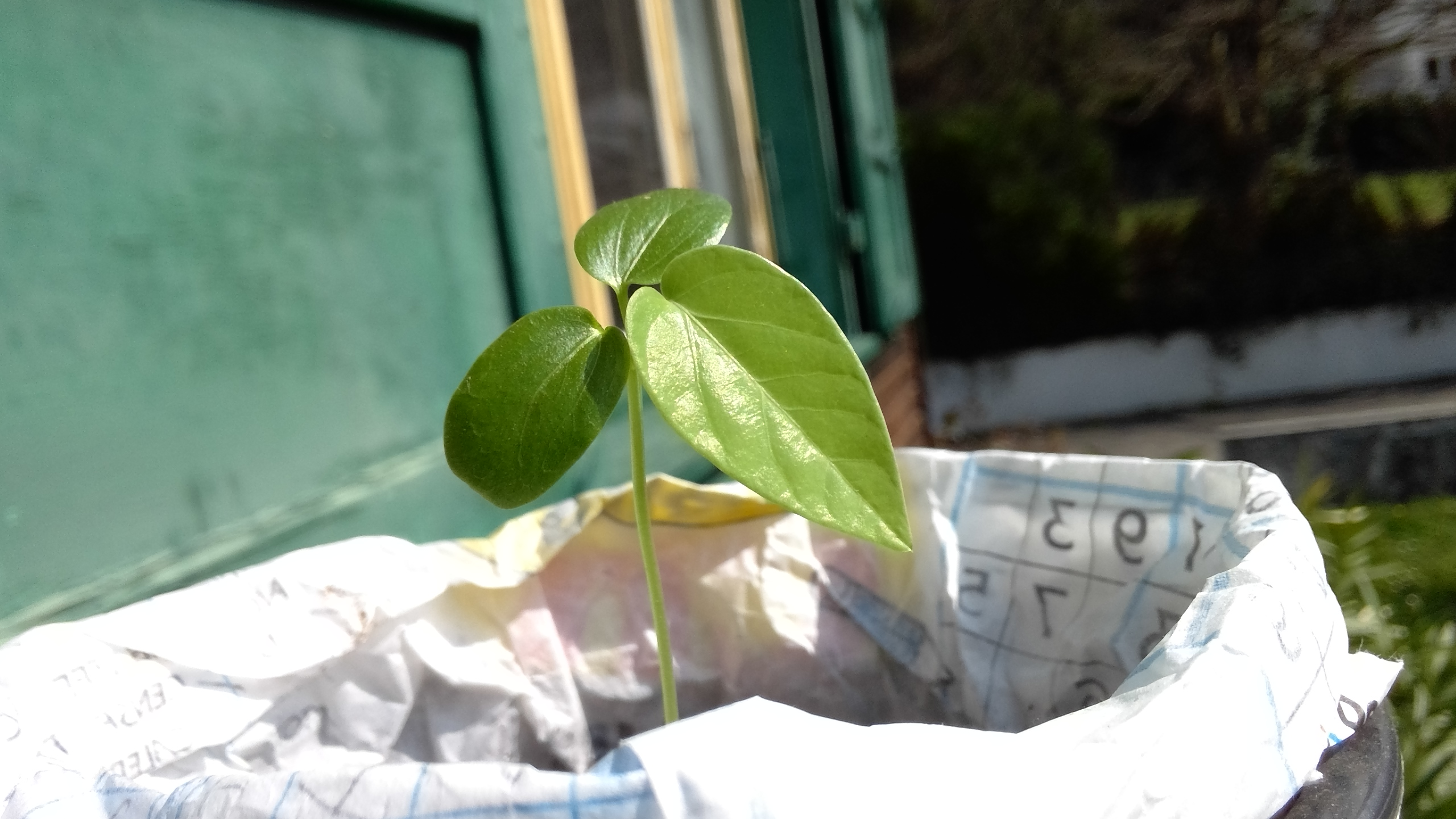
Seedling

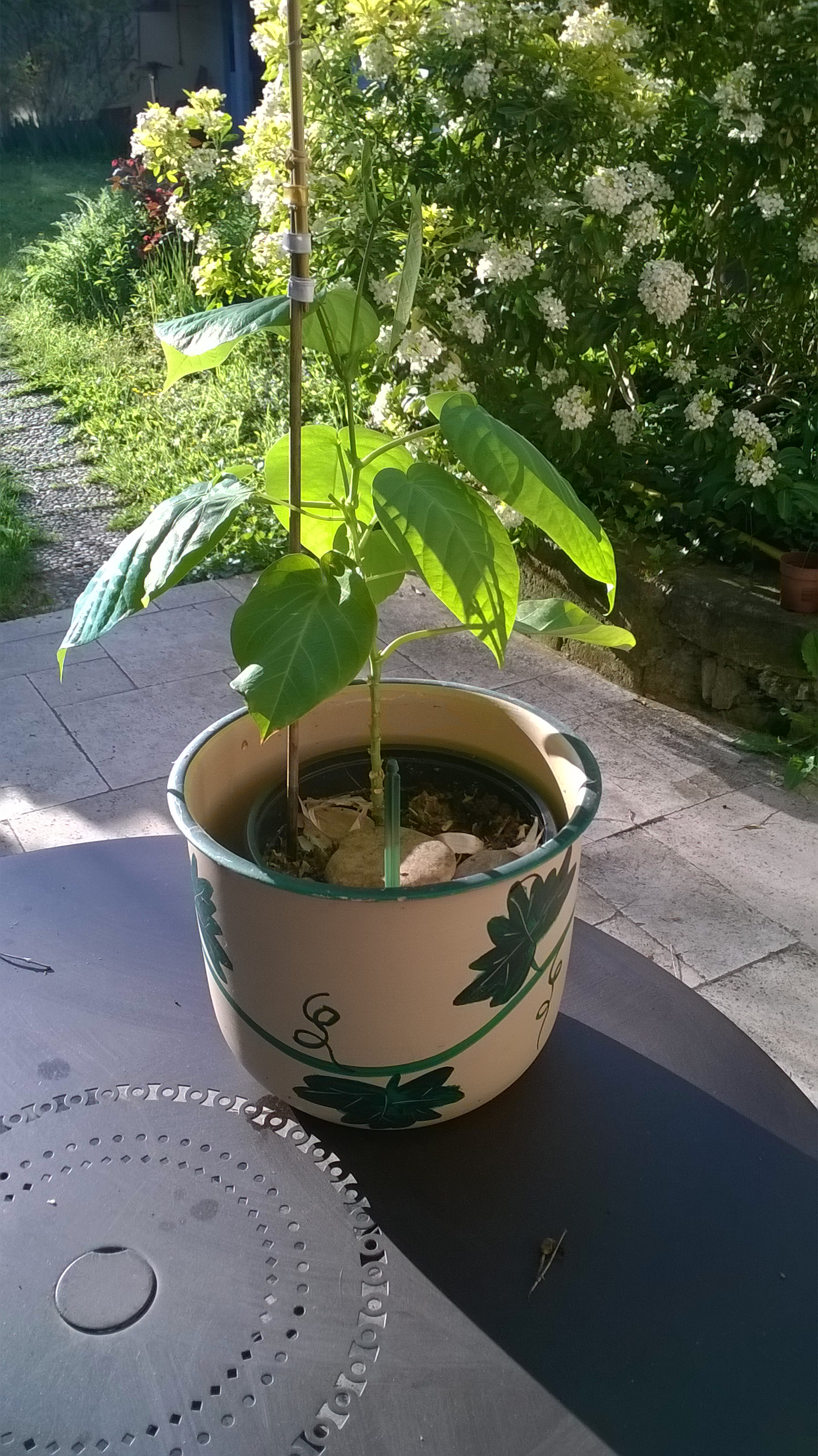
Year-old seedling

== Production ==
=== Soil requirements ===
Passiflora ligularis thrives in well-drained soils, such as loamy or clayey soil amended with peat and sand to improve aeration and prevent waterlogging. It adapts well to both medium-textured (loam) and heavier soils (clay) but shows a preference for lighter, well-structured soils that support better flowering and fruiting. While the plant can grow in low-fertility soils, it performs best in those rich in organic matter, and amending the soil with organic compost or well-rotted manure is recommended to improve fertility. The soil should have a slightly acidic to neutral pH, ideally between 6 and 7, as excessively acidic or alkaline soil can hinder nutrient uptake. Further, Passiflora ligularis can grow in hilly or mountainous areas with slopes of up to 75%.

=== Climate requirements ===
Passiflora ligularis grows optimally in warm, temperate climates with temperatures ranging from 15 to 25 °C (59–77 °F), as cold conditions can hinder its development and frost can damage leaves and fruit. The species favors humid environments with annual rainfall between 1,000 and 2,000 millimetres (39–79 in), supporting root growth and fruit development. Sunlight is critical for its growth, as abundant light promotes photosynthesis and fruit sweetness.

=== Seedbed requirements and sowing ===
The seedbed for Passiflora ligularis should be well-drained and nutrient-rich, prepared with loose, finely tilled soil to enhance root development. Seeds should be sown at a shallow depth of 1–2 cm (0.39–0.79 in) and adequately spaced to prevent overcrowding. Consistent soil moisture is important, although waterlogging should be avoided. The ideal germination temperature ranges from 20 to 30 °C (68–86 °F).

=== Cultivation management and fertilization ===
Balanced N-P-K (nitrogen-phosphorus-potassium) fertilizers should be applied every 4–6 weeks during the growing season, adjusted based on soil tests and plant needs. As a vine, Passiflora ligularis benefits from support structures like trellises, which improve air circulation and exposure to sunlight. Regular pruning removes dead or diseased foliage, focusing the plant's energy on fruit production and reducing disease risk.

== Biology ==
=== Life cycle stages ===
- Germination: Seeds germinate within 15 days under ideal conditions, influenced by the fruit's maturity and fermentation time.
- Vegetative growth: Characterized by rapid development of climbing stems and lobed leaves. Adequate light, water, and nutrients are crucial during this stage.
- Flowering: Flowers appear approximately six months after planting and rely on pollinators like Xylocopa spp. for efficient pollination.
- Fruiting: The fruit ripens approximately 70 days after pollination and contains sweet, aromatic pulp.

=== Physiological needs ===
The plant exhibits moderate salt tolerance, although high salinity can impair growth indicators. Regular pruning and trellising optimize vine management and airflow.

=== Interactions: pests, diseases, and symbionts ===
Passiflora ligularis is susceptible to various pests, diseases, and pathogens. For example, Agraulis vanillae larvae feed on foliage, leading to potential defoliation, and rodents in regions like Haiti consume seeds. Fungal pathogens such as Colletotrichum species and Fusarium solani can cause anthracnose and collar rot, respectively, while viral diseases like passion fruit woodiness disease significantly reduce yields. Mycorrhizal associations, common in Passiflora species, enhance nutrient uptake and provide resistance to soil-borne pathogens. Effective management includes integrated pest control, regular monitoring, the use of biological controls, and the cultivation of resistant cultivars to mitigate these challenges.

=== Genetic diversity ===
The genus Passiflora includes up to 520 species, offering a rich genetic pool for breeding. Interspecific hybridization between wild and cultivated species has been researched for trait improvement.

=== Breeding objectives ===
- Abiotic stress tolerance: Breeding varieties that withstand salinity, drought, and extreme temperatures.
- Fruit quality: Improvements in taste, acidity balance, and shelf life enhance marketability.
- Disease resistance: Developing resistance to major potyviruses reduces reliance on chemical controls.
- Yield improvement: Focused on cultivating high-yield varieties to meet market demands.

== Distribution and invasiveness ==
Passiflora ligularis is native to Central and northwestern South America and has been introduced and cultivated in different regions of the world, for example, India, East and Southeast Asia, New Zealand, Australia and some pacific Islands. It is considered invasive in some countries including Haiti, Jamaica, Indonesia, the Galapagos Islands and Samoa. In New Caledonia its introduction is prohibited due to its probability of becoming a weed. The plant can affect agriculture by suppressing native vegetation, limiting access to places, and posing risks to livestock, as the sweet granadilla can have toxic properties. It can also invade forests and other natural habitats, where it can displace undergrowth species.
