= Fried bake =

Caribbean dish

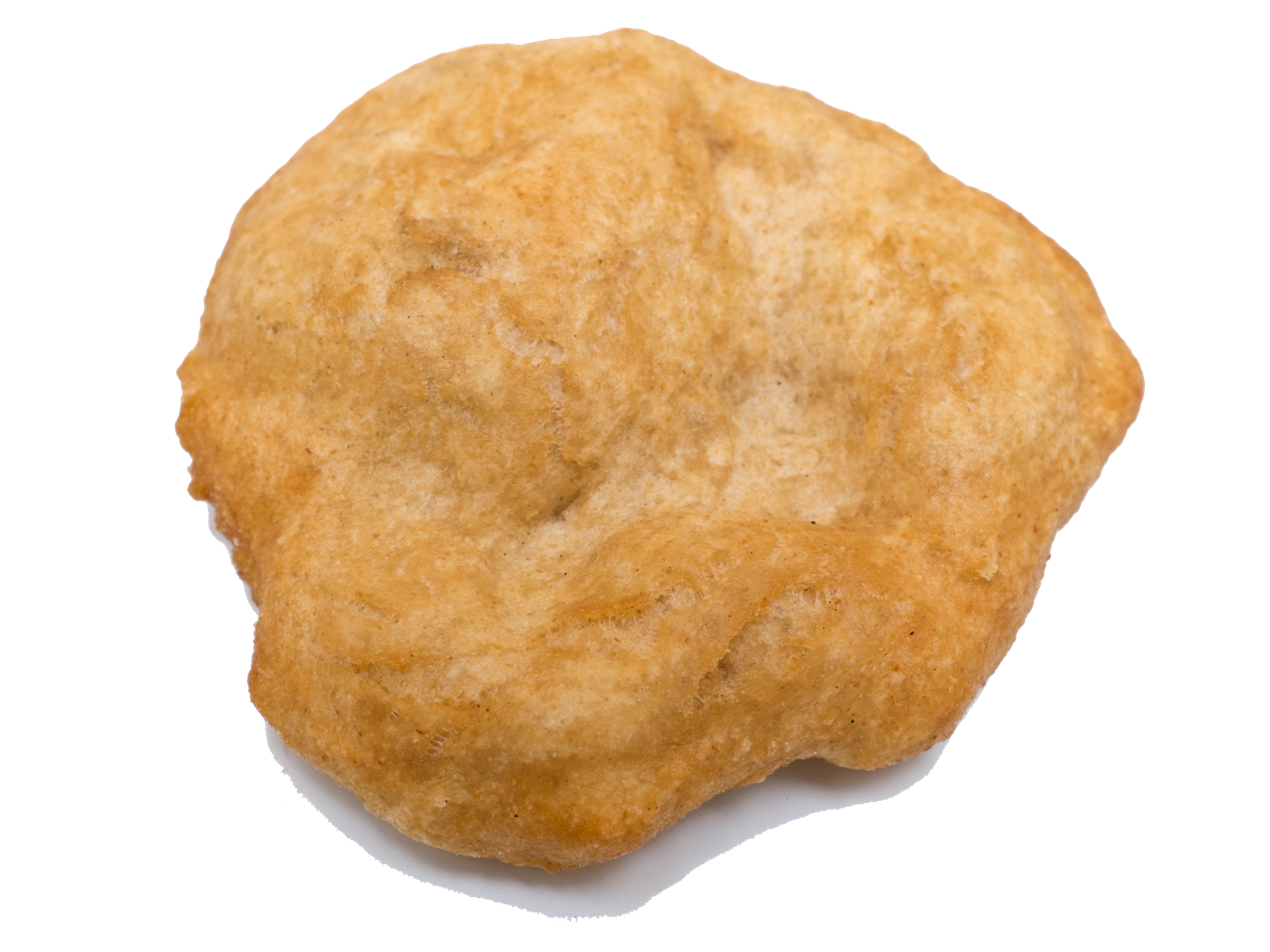
- A fried bake
- Type: bread
- Place of origin: Trinidad & Tobago
- Region or state: Caribbean
- Main ingredients: Flour

Fried bake is a Caribbean dish. Many West Indian nations including Trinidad and Tobago, Guyana, Saint Lucia, Saint Vincent and the Grenadines, Dominica and Grenada eat this dish. The main ingredient in fried bake is flour. It can be served in a multitude of ways. This dish is usually served with salt fish and steamed vegetables.

== See also ==
- Trinidad and Tobago cuisine
- Cuisine of Jamaica
- Cuisine of Dominica
- Bhatoora, a similar fried bread found in North India
- Culture of Grenada
