= Laapsi =

Indian dessert

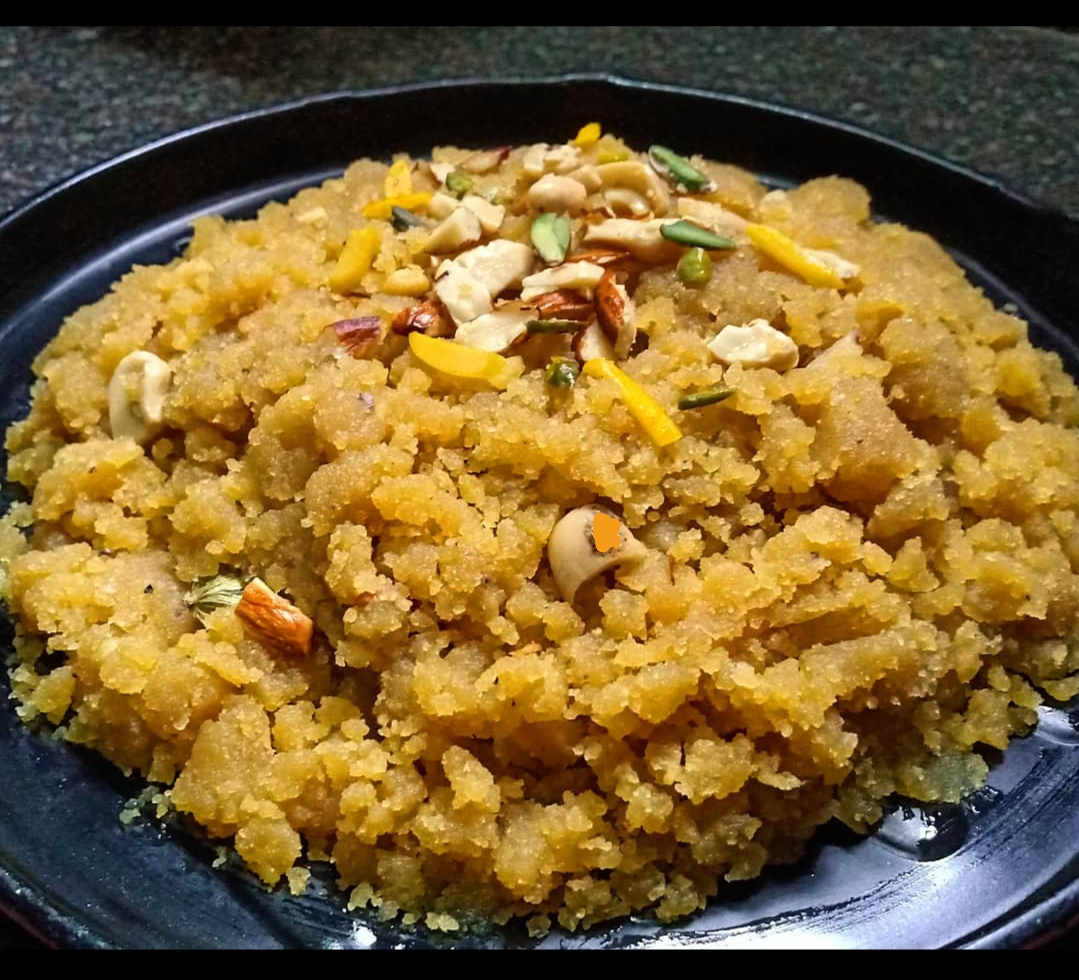
- Moong Dal Lapsi is commonly prepared during Diwali festival.
- Course: Dessert
- Place of origin: India
- Region or state: Maharashtra, Uttar Pradesh, Bihar, Haryana, Rajasthan, Gujarat, Madhya Pradesh
- Associated cuisine: India, Nepal, Trinidad and Tobago, Guyana
- Main ingredients: Grain flour or Broken wheat, milk, ghee, sugar or jaggery, nuts, raisins and other dried fruits

Laapsi or lapsi is an Indian sweet dish made using grain flour or broken wheat and ghee, along with milk, nuts, raisins and other dried fruits. Lapsi is commonly prepared during Hindu ceremonies and is served as a religious offering, especially to the devi. Lapsi forms an integral part of North Indian cuisine and has many variants.

== Etymology ==
The name Lapsi (लप्सी) or Laapsi (लापसी) is derived from Sanskrit word Lapsikā (लप्सिका).

== History ==
References to Lapsi are present in Ancient and Medieval Sanskrit literature, particularly Ayurvedic literature, Pākaśāstra texts (Hindu culinary texts) and Puranas (Hindu religious scriptures). Skanda Purana mentions Lapsika as a Naivedhya for Puja (Hindu ritual worship). Lapsi finds mention in an Ayurvedic text named Bhāvaprakāśa nighaṇṭu. The recipe of Lapsi is vividly described in Bhojanakutūhala, one of the important Pākaśāstra texts. The recipe of Lapsi in Bhojanakutūhala uses samita (refined wheat flour) as the main ingredient. Bhakt Surdas, a renowned Hindu saint of Bhakti tradition makes a mention of Lapsi in his Braj poetry.

लुचुई ललित लापसी सोहै । स्वाद सुबास सहज मन मोहै ।।
Luchuī Lalita Lāpasī Sohai, Svāda Subāsa Sahaja Mana Mohai

— Sūradāsa

== Variants ==
There are different types of Lapsi depending on the main ingredient:

1. Aate Ki Lapsi (Whole wheat flour Lapsi)
2. Suji or Rava ki Lapsi (Semolina Lapsi)
3. Dalia or Fada ki Lapsi (Broken wheat Lapsi)
4. Besan Ki Lapsi or Chana dal Lapsi (Gram flour or Bengal gram lentil Lapsi)
5. Moong dal Lapsi (Mung bean Lapsi)
6. Singhare Ki Lapsi (Water chestnut Lapsi)
7. Badam ki Lapsi (Almond Lapsi)

== Cultural uses ==
Different variants of Lapsi are prepared in Hindu households during different festive occasions and religious ceremonies. The combo of 'Lapsi & Puri' or 'Lapsi & Suhari' is prepared along with Kala chana(black Bengal gram), on Durga Ashtami festival. Usually, Suji Ki Lapsi is prepared for Durga Ashtami & other Mangalik karyas (auspicious works).

Singhare ki Lapsi is usually prepared as a Phalahaari diet for Vrat. Moong Dal Lapsi is a common dessert during Diwali festival. Besan Lapsi & Badam ki Lapsi is prepared as a winter dish.

Dalia or Fada ki Lapsi is a popular variant prevalent in the states of Rajasthan, Gujarat and Maharashtra.
