= Pelau =

Rice dish of the Caribbean

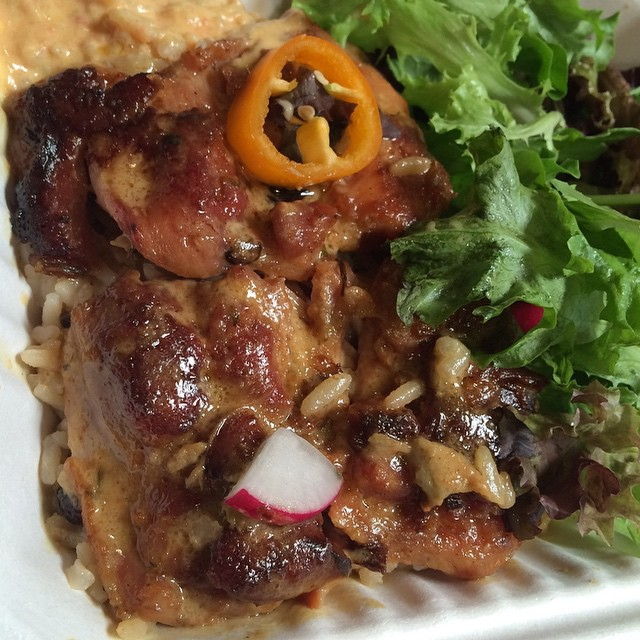
- Chicken pelau
- Type: Rice dish
- Course: Main
- Place of origin: West Indies
- Associated cuisine: Caribbean
- Serving temperature: Hot
- Main ingredients: Rice
- Ingredients generally used: Meat
- Variations: Curry pelau

Pelau is a traditional rice dish from the West Indies. Its main ingredients typically include meat (usually chicken or beef), rice, pigeon peas or cowpeas, coconut milk and sugar. Various vegetables and spices may be added. Common spices used in the dish are cardamom, cloves, cumin, and coriander. The meat is caramelised in brown sugar along with onion and garlic and the other ingredients are then added one by one, resulting in a dark brown stew.

An alternative preparation method is to sauté the meat, precook the rice, prepare the dish and bake it in the oven. Side dishes are optional; coleslaw is a typical choice.

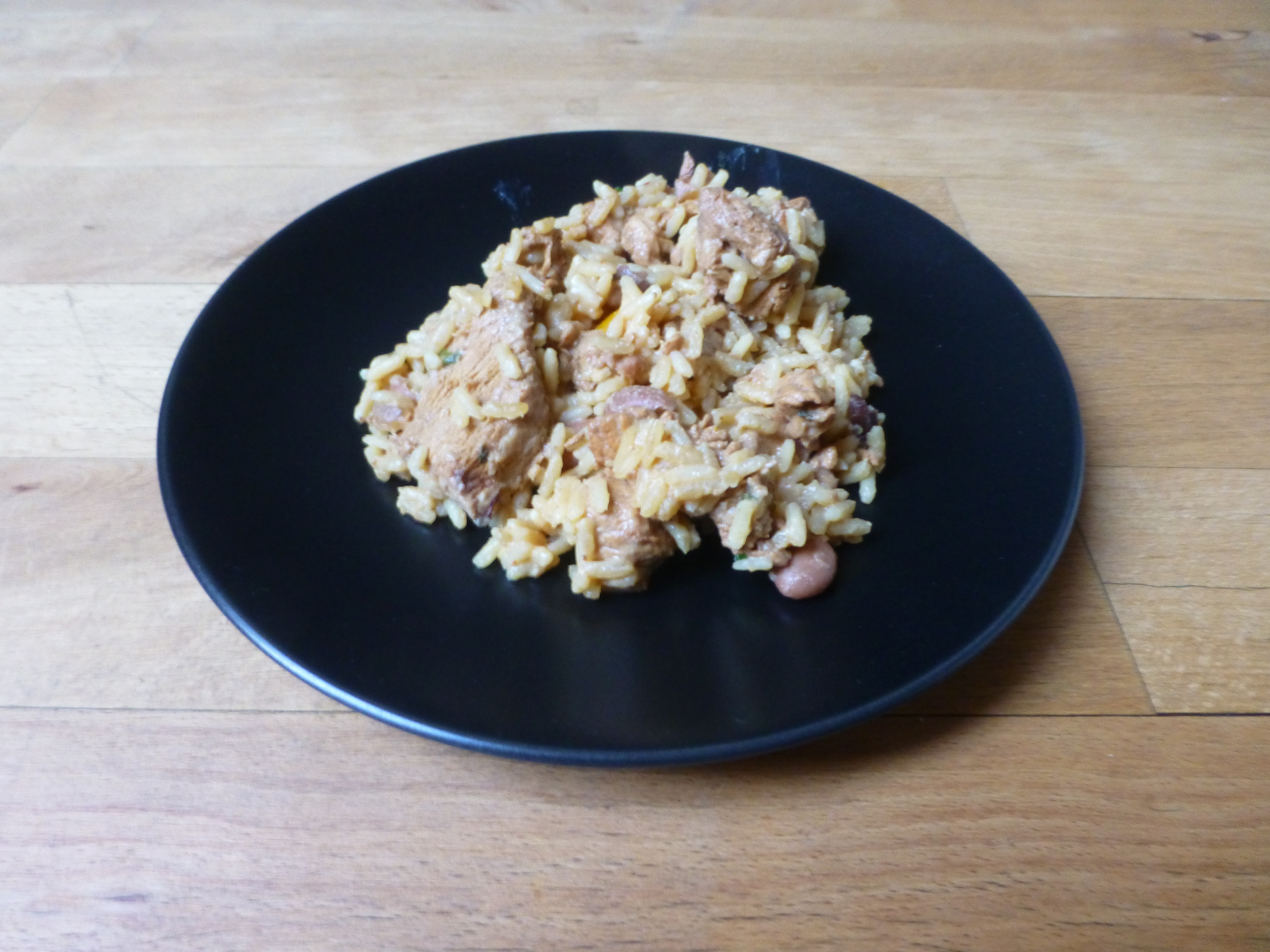
Pelau

Pelau shares its origins with pilaf (from Persian pilāw پلاو), a rice dish from Central Asia, the Middle East, East Africa, South Asia, and Spain, home of the original version of paella. Pelau is a Creole dish. When Trinidad was under Spanish colonial rule, Indian indentured servants passed down their version of the dish to African slaves who transformed it. The caramelisation of the meat goes back to African preparation traditions. Over time, the basic method of preparing pilaf, the caramelisation of meat and influences of the Trinidadian cuisine (especially with regard to available ingredients) mingled into today's pelau.

== See also ==
- List of rice dishes
