= North American cuisine =

Foods native to or popular in countries of North America

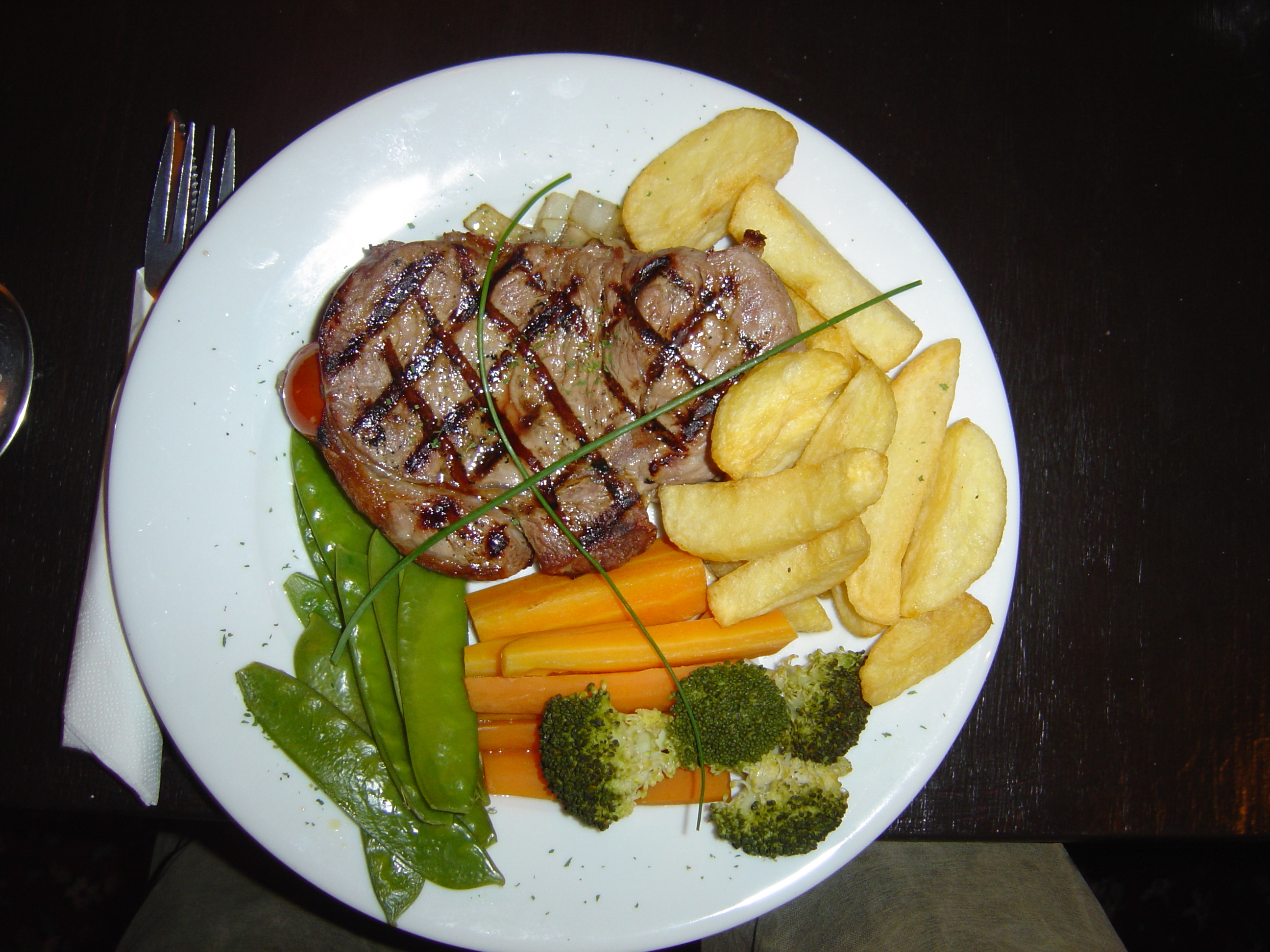
A sirloin steak dish along with assorted vegetables.

North American cuisine includes foods native to or popular in countries of North America, such as Canadian cuisine, American cuisine, African American cuisine, Mexican cuisine, Caribbean cuisine and Central American cuisine.North American cuisines display influence from many international cuisines, including Native American cuisine, Jewish cuisine, African cuisine, British cuisine, Middle Eastern cuisine, and especially European cuisine.

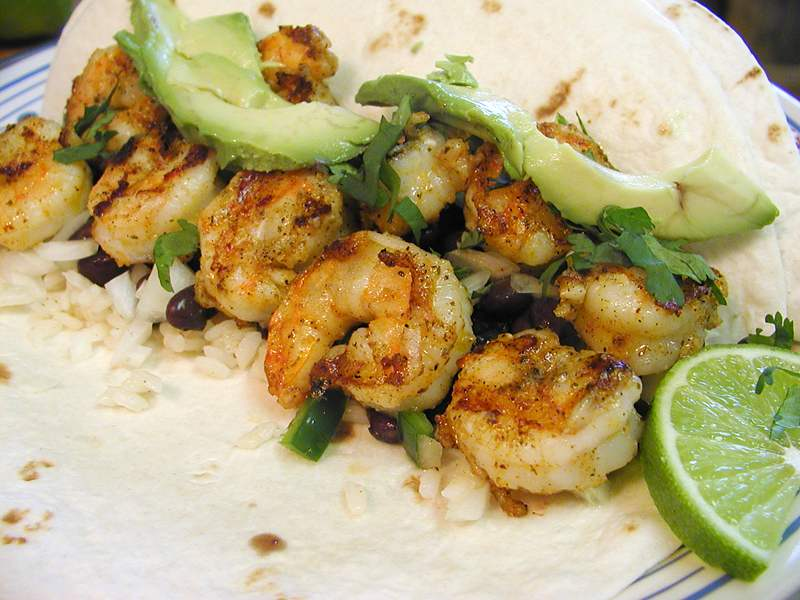
A grilled shrimp taco

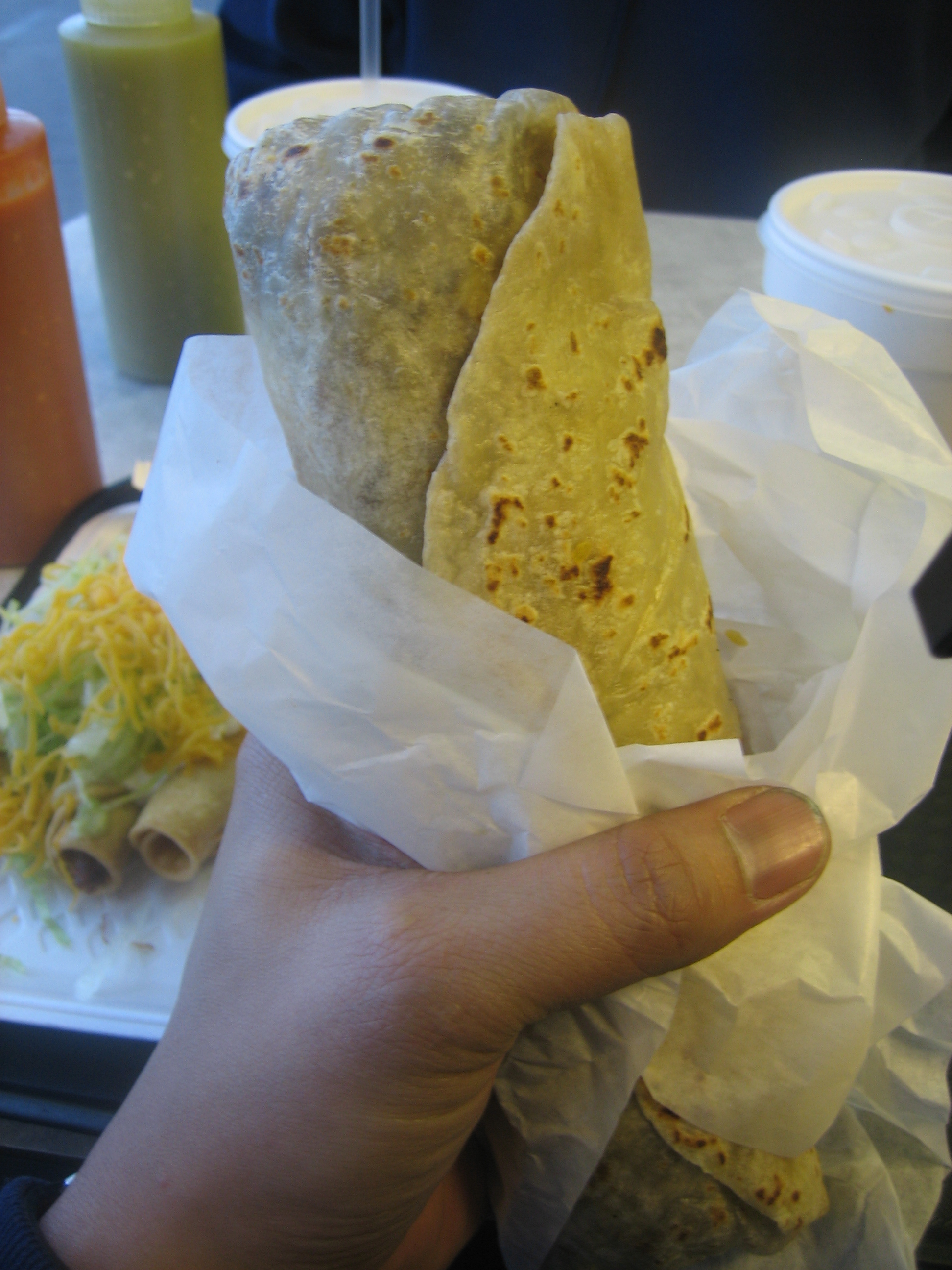
Burrito

The term "regional" is somewhat ambiguous, however, since the cuisine of Puerto Rico can differ markedly from Cuban cuisine; Mexican cuisine spills across the border into the Tex-Mex and Mexi-Cali "sub-cuisines"; and the cuisines of Michigan and Ontario have more in common with each other than either has with the cuisines of Manitoba or Iowa.

North American cuisine can also include much more localized dishes and cuisines, such regional cuisines like California cuisine.

== History ==
North American cuisine first originated with the settlement of the North American continent. Amerindian populations cultivated the native plants and animals and over time created unique cooking techniques and dishes.

The colonization of North America brought European, African and Asian cuisine to the region and these blended with the Amerindian cuisine of the settled populations.

As colonization continued and countries became established new cuisines and dishes sprouted across the region. Immigration from Europe brought a broader range of European cuisine to the region in the 17th and 18th centuries. In the 19th century Asian immigration increased adding a new cultural influence.

Later international immigration increased bringing even more food traditions and cuisines into North America. Today North American cuisines have global origins and influences in addition to unique modern creations native to the region.

== Countries ==
- American cuisine
- Anguillan cuisine
- Antigua and Barbuda cuisine
- Bahamian cuisine
- Barbadian cuisine
- Belizean cuisine
- Bermudian cuisine
- British Virgin Islands cuisine
- Canadian cuisine
- Caymanian cuisine
- Costa Rican cuisine
- Cuban cuisine
- Dominica cuisine
- Dominican Republic cuisine
- Greenlandic cuisine
- Grenadan cuisine
- Guatemalan cuisine
- Haitian cuisine
- Honduran cuisine
- Jamaican cuisine
- Mexican cuisine
- Montserratian cuisine
- Nicaraguan cuisine
- Panamanian cuisine
- Puerto Rican cuisine
- Saint Barthélemy cuisine
- Saint Lucian cuisine
- Salvadoran cuisine
- Trinidadian and Tobagonian cuisine
- United States Virgin Islands cuisine

== See also ==
- List of American regional and fusion cuisines
- Mesoamerican cuisine
- Caribbean cuisine
