= Caribbean cuisine =

Cuisine of the Caribbean

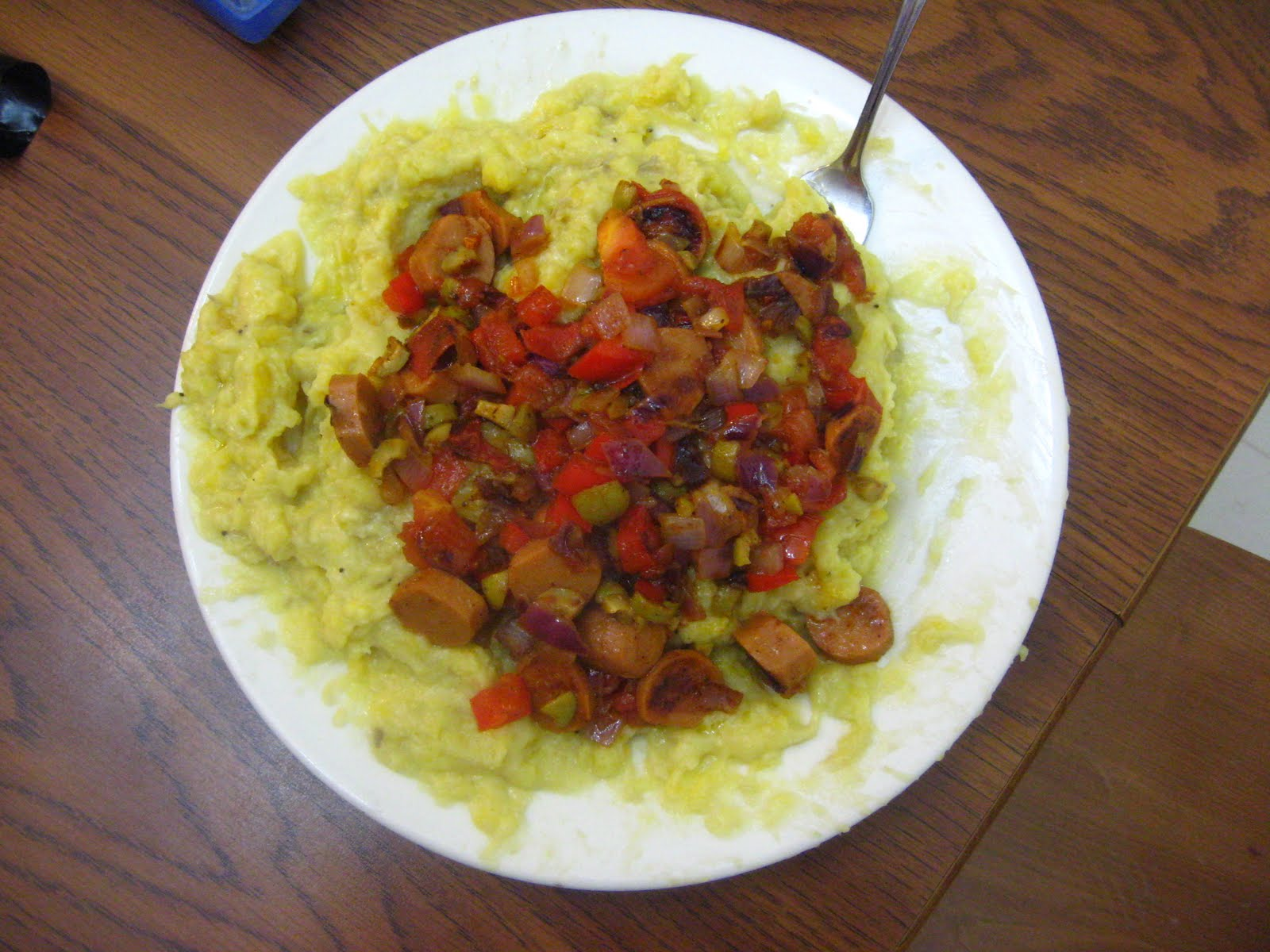
Mangú with plant-based "meat"

Caribbean cuisine is a fusion of West African, Creole, Amerindian, European, Latin American, Indian/South Asian, Chinese, Javanese/Indonesian, North American, and Middle Eastern cuisines. These traditions were brought from many countries when they moved to the Caribbean.

== History ==
Caribbean cuisine developed through colonization, slavery, plantation agriculture, migration, and trade. In plantation, and post-plantation societies, African, European, Asian, and Amerindian crops and food processing techniques combined with local adaptations to produce new Caribbean food traditions. Before European colonization, Indigenous Caribbean peoples cultivated cassava as a staple crop, along with corn, sweet potatoes, peppers, avocados, and guavas, which are staples in Caribbean food traditions.

Provision grounds were part of Caribbean food history under slavery. In some plantation societies, enslaved people grew food crops on unused estate land, which helped develop agricultural skills later used in Caribbean peasant farming after emancipation. Caribbean rural communities combined African, European, Asian, and Amerindian crops and food-processing techniques. In Jamaica, provision grounds helped enslaved Africans to grow crops such as eddoes, Guinea yams, dasheen, plantains, and cocoyams, and sell surplus produce in local markets.

As a result of colonization, the Caribbean became fusion of multiple culinary influences; British, Spanish, Dutch and French colonized the area and brought their respective cuisines, which mixed with West African, Amerindian, Indian/South Asian, East Asian, Portuguese, and Arab, influences from enslaved, indentured and other laborers brought to work on plantations.

== Caribbean dishes ==
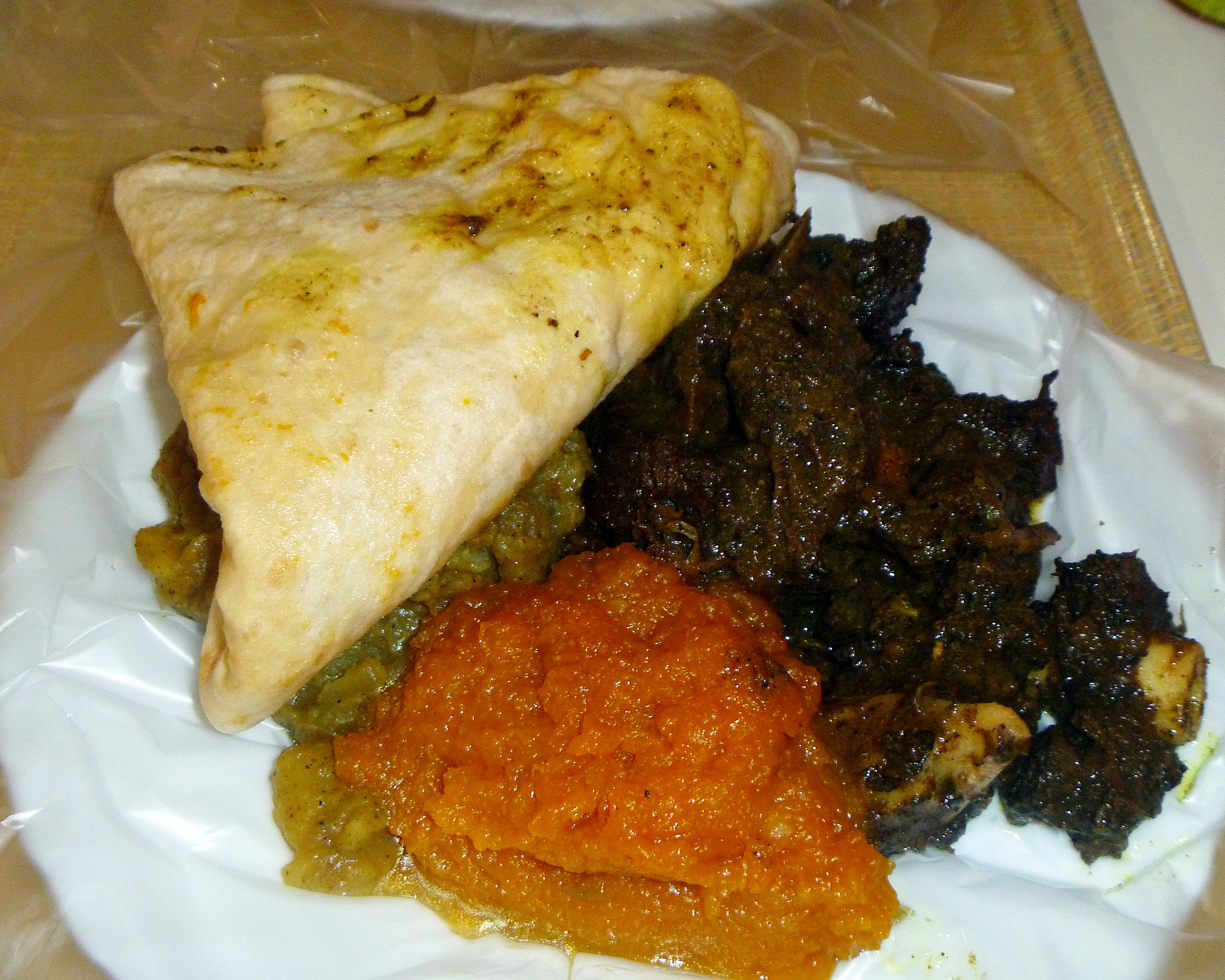
Dhalpurie roti, pumpkin tarkari, channa and aloo, and curry goat, Indian-origin dishes from Trinidad and Tobago

Ingredients that are common in most islands' dishes are rice, plantains, beans, cassava, cilantro, bell peppers, chickpeas, tomatoes, sweet potatoes, coconut, and variety of meats that are locally available, like beef, poultry, pork, goat, or fish. A characteristic seasoning for the region is a green herb-and-oil-based marinade called sofrito. Ingredients may include garlic, onions, Scotch bonnet peppers, celery, green onions, and herbs like cilantro, Mexican mint, chives, marjoram, rosemary, tarragon, and thyme. This green seasoning is used for a variety of dishes like curries, stews, and roasted meats. Many everyday Caribbean dishes became common during slavery. Dishes like rice and beans are common in local cuisine in several Caribbean societies.

Traditional dishes are important to regional culture that, for example, the local version of Caribbean goat stew has been chosen as the official national dish of Montserrat and is also one of the signature dishes of St. Kitts and Nevis. Another popular dish in the Anglophone Caribbean is called "cook-up", or pelau. Ackee and saltfish is another popular dish unique to Jamaica. Callaloo is a dish containing leafy vegetables such as spinach and sometimes okra amongst others, and is found widely in the Caribbean, with a distinctively mixed African and Indigenous character.

The variety of dessert dishes in the area also reflects the mixed origins of the recipes. In some areas, black cake, a derivative of English Christmas pudding, may be served, especially on special occasions.

== Health and Wellness from Carribean dishes ==
Carribean cuisine is also known for health benefits and the use of fresh and natural ingrediants. Fruits such as mangoes pineapple are sources of vitamin c, which helps the immune system, which reduces inflammation, and helps lower the risk of illnesses. Spices such as bay leaves, ginger, nutmeg, and cinnamon also help with digestion and provide antiocatants. Another major part of carribean cuisine is the use of herbs and seasing instead of relying on heavily overly processed foods. The combination of fresh ingrediants and cooking techniqes not only make carribean food flavorful and delicious but also a healthy alternative.

== By location ==
- Anguillian cuisine
- Antigua and Barbuda cuisine
- Aruban cuisine
- Bahamian cuisine
- Barbadian cuisine
- Cayman Islands cuisine
- Cuban cuisine
- Curaçaoan cuisine
- Dominica cuisine
- Dominican Republic cuisine
- Grenadan cuisine
- Guadeloupean cuisine
- Haitian cuisine
- Jamaican cuisine
- Martinique cuisine
- Montserratian cuisine
- Puerto Rican cuisine
- Saint Barthélemy cuisine
- Saint Kitts and Nevis cuisine
- Saint Lucian cuisine
- Trinidad and Tobago cuisine
- Turks and Caicos Islands cuisine
- Virgin Islands cuisine

== See also ==
- Ground provisions
- List of cuisines
- Caribbean Chinese cuisine
- Puerto Rican Chinese cuisine
