= Goombay Punch =

Carbonated soft drink

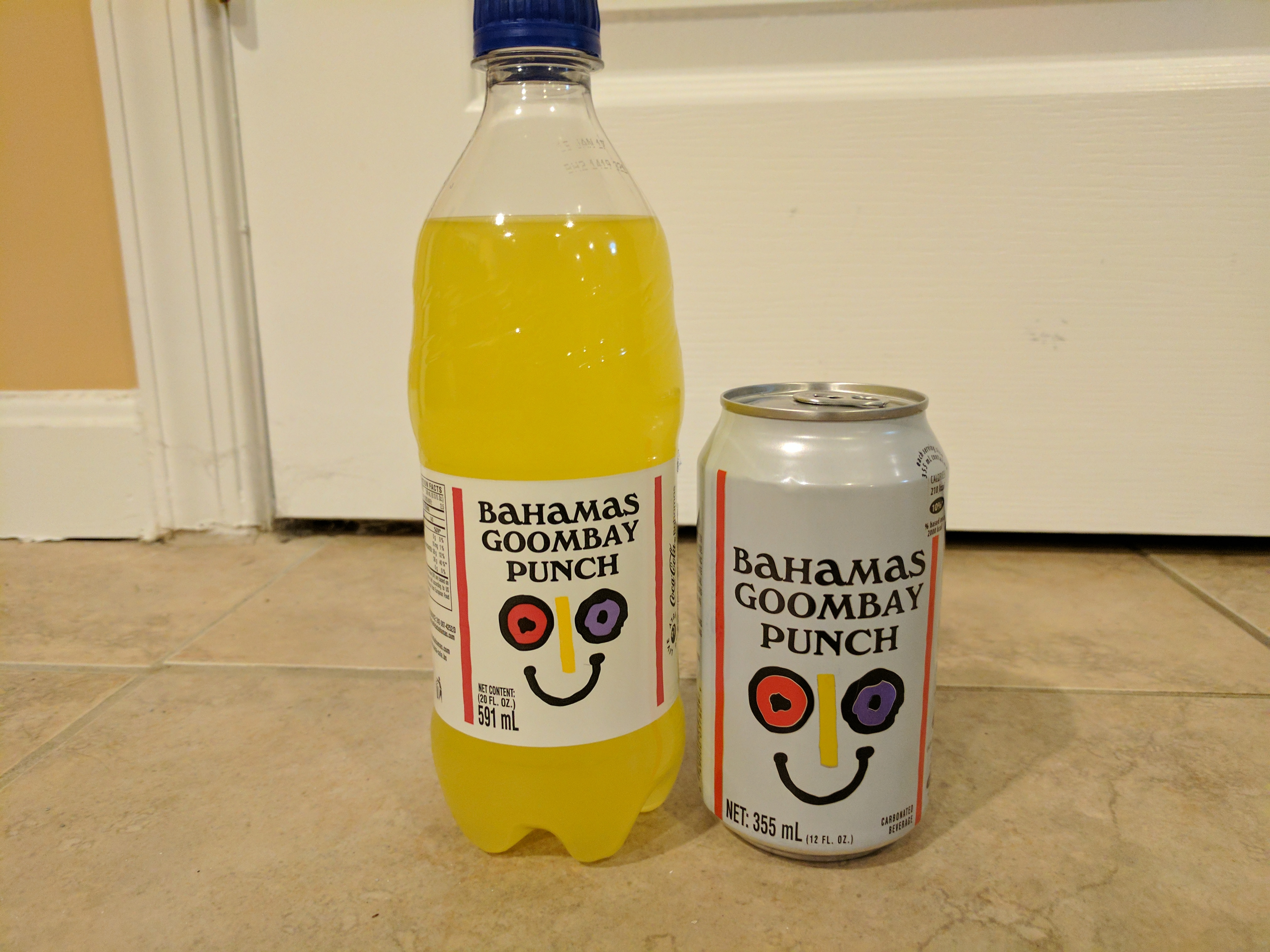
Picture of a 20 fl oz Bottle of Bahamas Goombay Punch and a 12 fl oz can of Bahamas Goombay Punch.

Bahamas Goombay Punch is a carbonated beverage that is produced in The Bahamas by the Caribbean Bottling Company Bahamas Ltd., the main distributor of Coca-Cola products in the Bahamas. It is very sweet and has a high sugar content. The taste is also very strong and has a pineapple flavor. Goombay Punch is widely available throughout The Bahamas in 12 fl oz cans as well as 20 fl oz bottles. Six packs of the soft drink are also widely available. The product comes in two varieties, Bahamas Goombay Punch (the stock pineapple-banana flavor) and Goombay Fruit Champagne. The regular flavor is yellow in color.

== See also ==
- Bahamian cuisine
- Goombay
- Goombay Smash
