= Agriculture in Antigua and Barbuda =

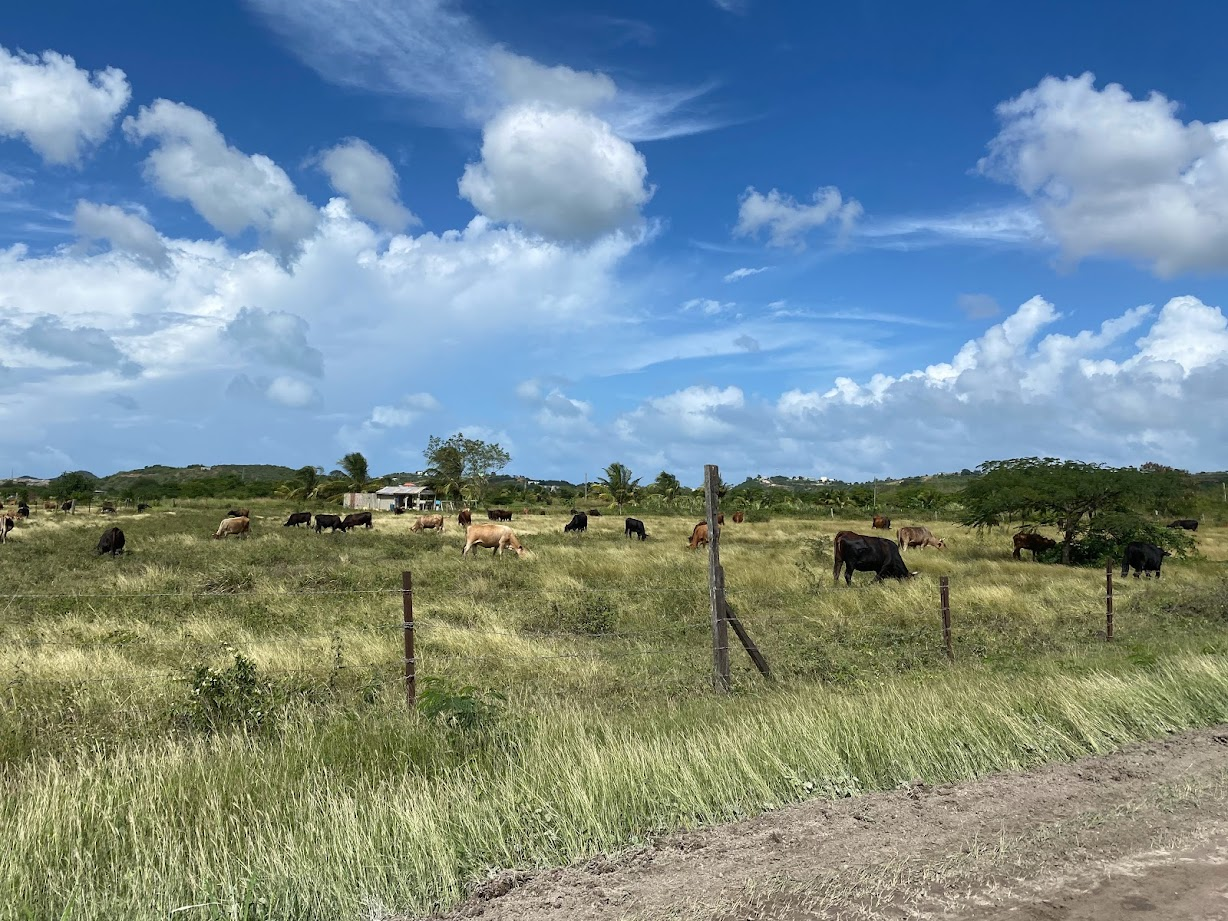
A farm in Ebenezer, 2021

Agriculture has been an important industry in Antigua and Barbuda since it was colonised in the 1600s. Today, less than five per cent of the population works in agriculture, and agriculture only contributes to 2.1% of the GDP. The primary crops exported by Antigua and Barbuda are pineapples, coconuts, and other tropical fruits and vegetables. 20.5% of the country's land is used for agriculture.

== History ==
The sugar industry in Antigua began in the 1600s, developed by English settlers. Slaves were brought to the island to work on these plantations. Since Antigua was settled, sugar has been the island's staple crop. In 1845, steam power was brought to the island resulting in central sugar mills becoming commonplace. Three primary sugar mills were established that lasted until the emergence of the Antigua Trades and Labour Union. Plantations would also produce rum until the early 20th century. In the 1960s the V.C. Bird government began to phase out the sugar industry in favour of tourism, with Parliament purchasing nearly all of the island's sugar estates in 1969. Barbuda was primarily used throughout its history for the raising of livestock, and the island was one of the few in the Leeward Islands without a sugar industry. Following the collapse of the sugar industry, agriculture in Antigua and Barbuda became primarily focused on animal husbandry and the production of fruits and vegetables.

== Tropical fruits ==
Tropical fruits are an important product in Antigua and Barbuda, being central to the country's cuisine. The Antigua black pineapple is the symbol of tropical fruit production in the country, however, due to low yields, Antigua and Barbuda does not export pineapples. Mangoes are also an important crop in the country, although in 2024, a shortened mango season due to unusual weather patterns resulted in many trees in the country producing lower yields.

== Fisheries ==
As Antigua and Barbuda is an archipelagic nation, fisheries have long been important to the country's economy. Antigua and Barbuda primarily exports lobster to the French Caribbean, China, and Japan. About 1,200 people are employed in the fishing sector.

== See also ==
- Beekeeping in Antigua and Barbuda
- Economy of Antigua and Barbuda
