= Macheteada =

Honduran fried dough snack

- Type: Fried dough
- Place of origin: Honduras
- Main ingredients: Flour

A macheteada (Spanish pronunciation: [mat͡ʃeteˈada]), is a Honduran fried flour tortilla snack, typically prepared using leftover dough from baleadas. When eaten for breakfast or dessert, macheteadas are commonly drizzled with honey, agave syrup, or maple syrup.

Macheteadas are believed to originate from banana fields. Macheteadas are a staple in the Northern Departments of Honduras, such as Atlántida and Cortés.

== Etymology ==
Macheteadas get their name from the Spanish word machetear, which means to chop with a machete. It attained this name due to the three prominent slits resembling cuts from a machete through the middle of the dough.
