= Beekeeping in Antigua and Barbuda =

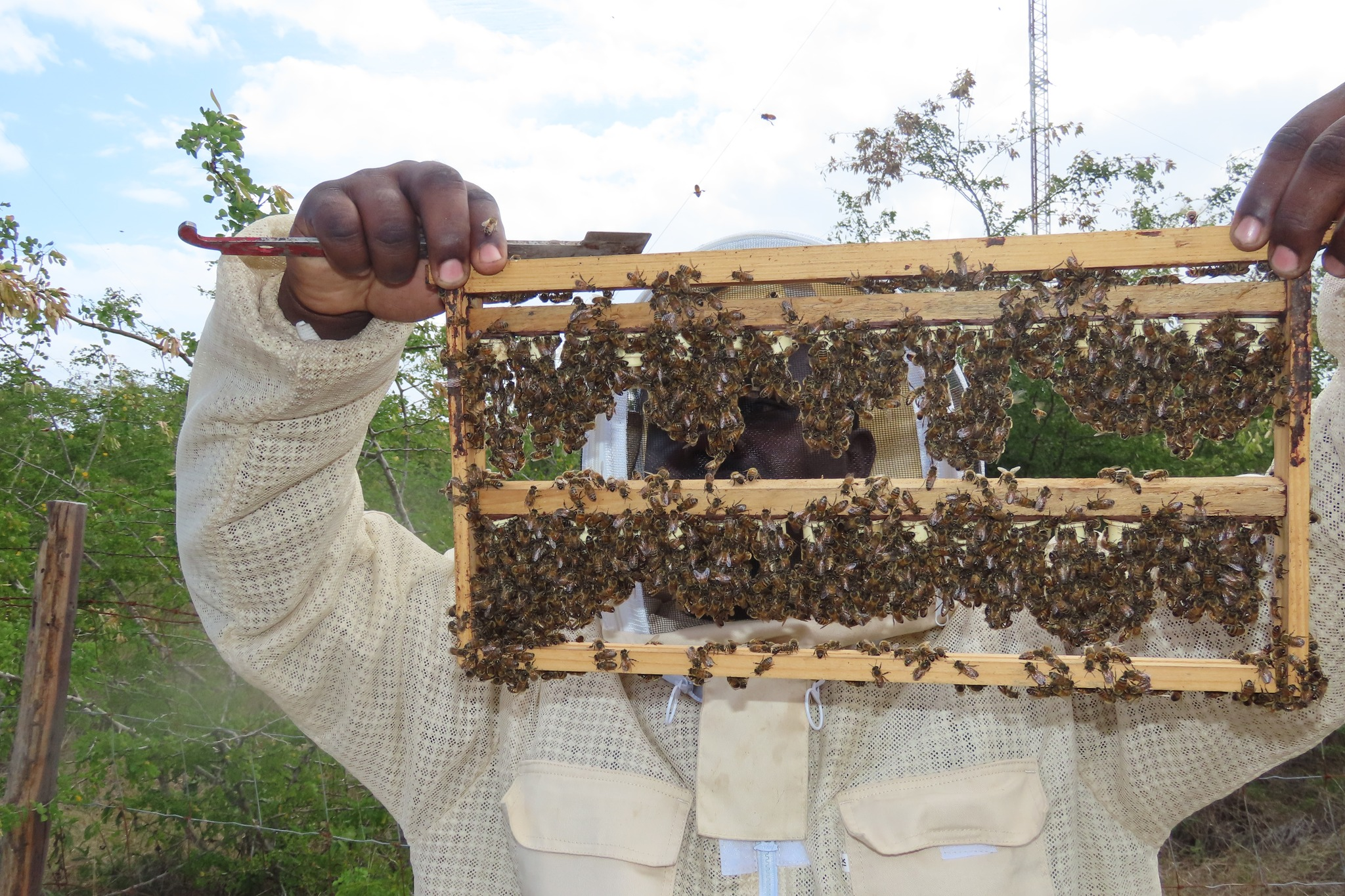
Inspection of cells during a queen rearing course

In Antigua and Barbuda, beekeeping began in 1945 as an informal industry when people began harvesting honey from bees that were living in trees.

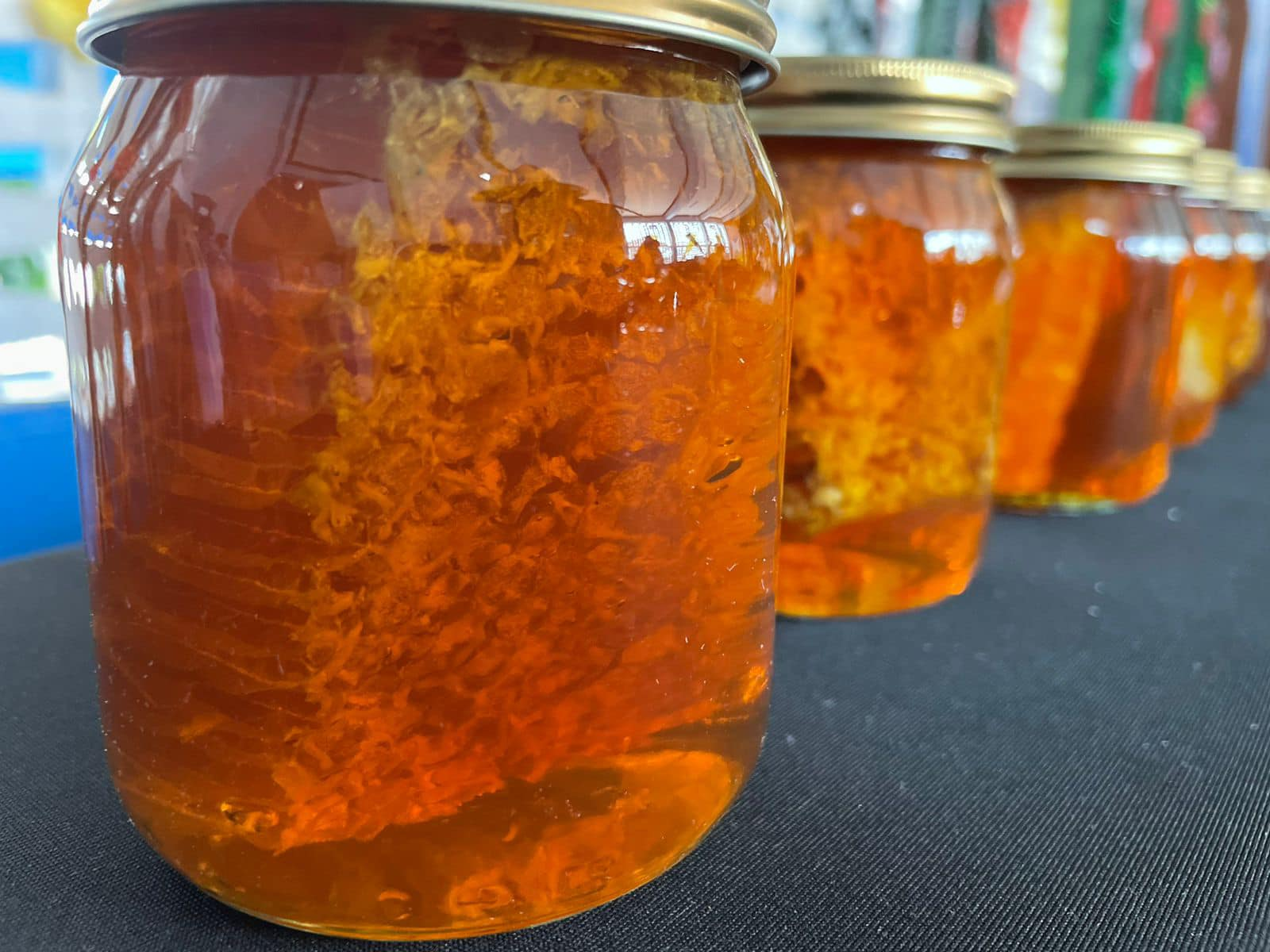
Antiguan honey products at an exhibition in Saint Lucia

== History ==
After the beginning of informal beekeeping in 1945, in 1982 the Meals from Millions/Freedom from Hunger Foundation offered the first beekeeping programme in Antigua. This programme offered both technical and financial assistance to the few beekeepers that were located on the island. Hank Theones facilitated the beekeepers' training process and demonstrated the removal of hives from houses and trees.

Prior to the beginning of the beekeeping project in Barbuda, it was commonly believed that the island did not have any native bee species. Following a trip to Barbuda in 1987, during which it was checked to see if there was enough food for bees to forage and council members were met with, it was determined that the island did not. More than a dozen beekeepers were educated on the island of Barbuda, and more than twelve beehives were shipped there.

=== Recent history in Barbuda ===
Hurricane Irma made landfall on Antigua and Barbuda on September 6, 2017. The eye of the Category 5 hurricane passed directly over Barbuda, causing catastrophic damage, particularly to its agricultural and fishing sectors, including crops, livestock, bees, infrastructure, and equipment. Despite the destruction, recovery efforts have focused on rebuilding more sustainable and climate-resilient food and agricultural systems. Four years after the hurricane, an agro-industrial facility was established as a public-private partnership, integrating production, processing, storage, packaging, and marketing operations. The Ministry of Agriculture, Fisheries, and Barbuda Affairs adopted the "Green Island" concept to guide the redevelopment of Barbuda’s agriculture sector. This initiative emphasizes organic agriculture, food safety compliance, water-efficient farming, intensive small ruminant systems, value-chain development, and biodiversity preservation.

Collaborative efforts between the Food and Agriculture Organization (FAO) and the Inter-American Institute for Cooperation on Agriculture (IICA) have supported this recovery process. These organizations aim to build the capacity of Micro, Small, and Medium Enterprises (MSMEs) to enhance food security, livelihoods, and climate resilience. From August 9–11, 2021, a training program titled "Training for the Honey Value Chain in Antigua and Barbuda" was held in Barbuda. Conducted by local consultants from IICA with virtual support from the FAO Sub-regional Office, the program focused on building capacity among new beekeepers, particularly in producing logwood honey. The training covered various aspects of the honey value chain, including production practices, business management, marketing, and distribution. Participants were provided with start-up apiary kits containing essential equipment.

Interviews with local apiculturists were conducted during the program to gather data on the local honey market. The mentorship component of the program, supported by the Antigua Beekeepers Cooperative and senior Barbuda beekeepers, ensures ongoing guidance and support for new beekeepers. Further training sessions in the honey value chain were conducted in Antigua from August 19–31, 2021, involving 20 established and new beekeepers, along with technical staff from the Ministry of Agriculture, Lands, Fisheries, and Barbuda Affairs.

In 2018, the Inter-American Institute for Cooperation on Agriculture (IICA) and the Caribbean Agricultural Research and Development Institute (CARDI) donated $5,000 worth of equipment to support the beekeeping industry in Antigua and Barbuda. During a ceremony at the Ministry of Agriculture, the equipment was presented to Arthur Nibbs, Minister of Agriculture. Approximately $3,000 worth of the materials were designated for Barbuda to aid local farmers as part of ongoing efforts to rebuild the island’s agricultural sector, which suffered extensive damage during Hurricane Irma in September 2017. Since the hurricane, IICA and CARDI have contributed over $200,000 in materials and labor to agricultural recovery initiatives, focusing on plant-based agriculture, livestock, and beekeeping. Craig Thomas, an IICA national specialist, noted that the organizations continued to monitor and evaluate their efforts through workshops and capacity-building sessions in Barbuda. Additionally, CARDI representative Paul Lucas highlighted the uniqueness of Barbuda-produced honey, describing it as a product with distinctive quality and market potential. CARDI has also undertaken the development of specific honey labels to support local branding efforts. Hurricane Irma, a Category 5 storm, caused severe destruction across Barbuda, leading to the temporary evacuation of its entire population.

=== Antigua Beekeepers Cooperative Society ===
In 2022, the headquarters of the Beekeepers Cooperative in Belmont underwent significant improvements funded by a US$16,000 grant from the Australian High Commission. The grant was secured through a collaboration between the Inter-American Institute for Cooperation on Agriculture (IICA) and the Ministry of Agriculture. Craig Thomas, IICA’s National Specialist, explained in an interview with the Antigua Observer that the initial project proposal, submitted in 2019 in partnership with Brent Georges, President of the Beekeepers Cooperative, was unsuccessful. However, the revised proposal was resubmitted and approved the following year. The upgraded facility aims to provide beekeepers with affordable access to essential resources, including an extraction facility, which was previously unavailable locally. Prior to this initiative, many beekeepers had to travel abroad to access proper honey extraction facilities.

== Young people in beekeeping ==
In 2018, the Antigua and Barbuda Beekeeping Cooperative partnered with the Gilbert Agricultural and Rural Development (GARD) Centre, the Australian Embassy in Trinidad and Tobago, and the Mill Reef Fund to train young people in beekeeping, beeswax soap production, and bee box construction. Twenty-two participants enrolled in a ten-week training program covering topics such as hive management, swarm collection, beeswax product creation, and business management. According to June Jackson, acting executive director of the GARD Centre, the initiative aimed to empower participants to establish their own businesses in apiculture and related industries. She highlighted the commitment of trainers to provide ongoing support to participants beyond the workshop’s completion. The program was expected to boost the local beekeeping industry, which had faced challenges from Hurricane Irma and land-clearing activities that disrupted hive construction. The Mill Reef Fund and the Australian Embassy contributed funding for essential resources, including beekeeping suits, lumber for bee boxes, trainer fees, and other equipment. The workshop sought to address industry setbacks while fostering entrepreneurship among young people in Antigua and Barbuda.

== Statistics ==
Number of beekeepers by sex/age
Gender	Age 15-25	Age 25-35	Age 35-45	Age 45-55	Age 55-65	Age 65 and above
Female	0	2	3	2	1	2
Male	3	4	11	3	1	4

It is estimated that there are between 460 and 480 colonies that are managed by members of the Antigua and Barbuda Beekeepers Cooperative. It is estimated that another 150 hives are managed by people who are not members. The Longstroth Hive, which is utilized in Antigua and Barbuda despite the presence of drought, typically produces a yield of sixty to seventy pounds (five and a half to four gallons) annually. Under typical circumstances, the local beehives typically produce between 100 and 120 pounds of honey (10-11 gal).

== See also ==
- Beekeeping in the United States
- Agriculture in Antigua and Barbuda
