= Baleada =

Traditional Honduran dish

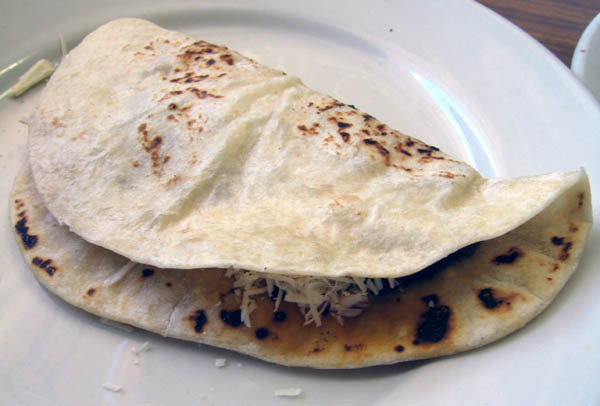
- A baleada, as it is usually served
- Type: Tortilla
- Place of origin: Honduras
- Main ingredients: Wheat flour, fried beans and crumbled cheese

A baleada (Spanish pronunciation: [baleˈaða]) is a traditional Honduran dish, believed to have originated on the northern coast of the country, particularly La Ceiba. It is composed of a flour tortilla, filled with a smear of mashed refried red beans (a variety of bean native to Central and South America), crema (mantequilla blanca), and crumbled queso duro (salty hard cheese). This is usually called baleada sencilla (simple baleada). Other ingredients may include scrambled eggs, avocados, or meat.

== See also ==
- Phaseolus vulgaris
- Macheteada
- Black turtle bean
- Honduran cuisine
