= Bahamian cuisine =

Foods and beverages of the Bahamas

Bahamian cuisine refers to the foods and beverages of the Bahamas. It includes seafood such as fish, shellfish, lobster, crab, and conch, as well as tropical fruits, rice, peas, pigeon peas, and pork. Popular seasonings commonly used in dishes include chillies (hot pepper), lime, tomatoes, onions, garlic, allspice, ginger, cinnamon, rum, and coconut. Rum-based beverages are popular on the islands. Since the Bahamas consist of a multitude of islands, notable culinary variations exist.

Bahamian cuisine is somewhat related to that of the American South, with dishes held in common such as "fish 'n' grits". A large portion of Bahamian foodstuffs are imported (cf. economy of the Bahamas). International cuisine is offered, especially at hotels.

Many specialty dishes are available at roadside stands, beachside, and in fine-dining establishments. In contrast to the offerings in the city of Nassau and the many hotels, "shack"-type food stands and restaurants (including Goldies and Twin Brothers) are located at Arawak Cay on West Bay Street about 15 minutes from downtown Nassau and 25 minutes from Atlantis Paradise Island resort. Travellers Rest Restaurant, in Nassau, is known for serving authentic "local" foods.

Bahamian cuisine is showcased at many large festivals, including Independence Day on July 10 (during which inhabitants prepare special dishes like guava duff), Fox Hill Day (second Tuesday in August), and Emancipation Day. Some settlements have festivals associated with the traditional crop or food of that area, such as the Pineapple Fest in Gregory Town, Eleuthera.

Bahamian traditions and food have been exported to other countries with emigrants. Coconut Grove, Florida holds the Goombay Festival in June featuring Bahamian culture, food and music. Fantasy Fest in Key West, Florida includes a two-day street party known as Goombay held in Key West's Bahama Village neighborhood that features Bahamian food and other culture.

== Beverages ==
Fruit juices, including coconut water, are often used for beverages. Switcha is a "lemonade" made with native limes. Goombay Punch is a commercially prepared, highly sweetened soft drink. It differs from the Goombay Smash, which is an alcoholic preparation. Triple B is a non-alcoholic malt drink made by the Bahamian Brewery.

Alcoholic beverages include rum, which is sometimes infused with coconut. Rum is also used in mixed drinks such as rum punch. Sky juice is a drink consisting of coconut water blended with condensed milk and gin. The Yellow Bird, the Bahama Mama, the Goombay Smash, and Planter's Punch are popular local drinks. Nassau Royale is a Bahamian liqueur and is used to make the C. C. Rider. The Bahamian Brewery makes beers including Sands, Bush Crack, High Rock (named for a geographic feature: High Rock) and Strong Back. Kalik is a Bahamian beer.

== Soups ==
Bahamians enjoy many soups popular throughout the Caribbean including conch chowder or stewed conch, stewed fish and split pea soup (made with ham). Peas are used in various soups, including a soup made with dumplings and salt beef. Souse is a soup usually made with chicken, lime, potatoes and pepper, and if made with fish is called boiled fish. These soup dishes are usually served with Johnny cake or grits, often for breakfast or as a post-hangover meal.

Turtle soup was once a mainstay before turtles became endangered.

== Seafood ==
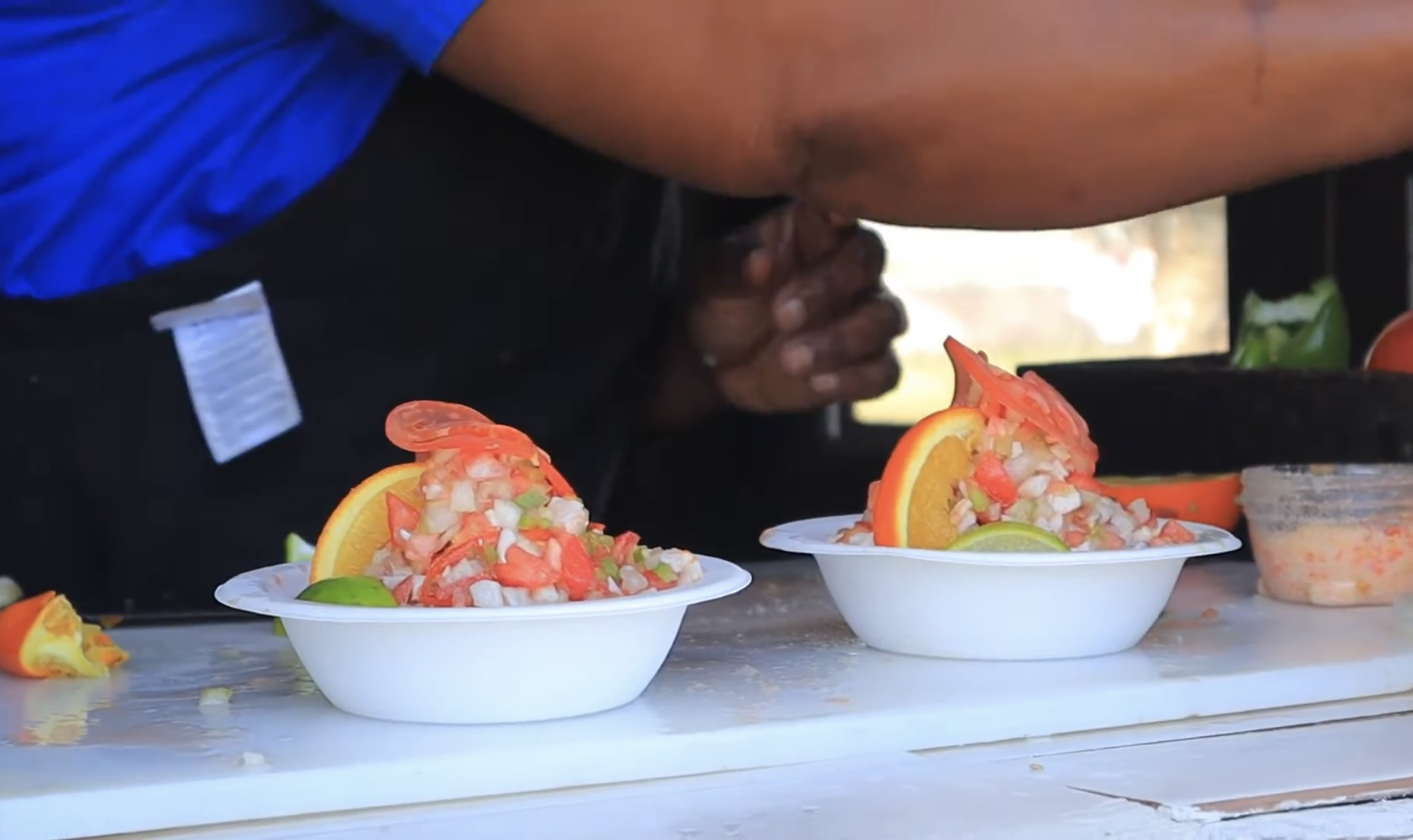
Conch salad

Seafood is a staple in the Bahamas. Conch, a large tropical mollusk (sea snail) with firm, white flesh, is the national dish of the Bahamas. Conch can be prepared in a number of ways. It can be steamed, stewed, deep-fried ("cracked conch" or conch fritters), used in soups (especially conch chowder), or served in salads. Crab, including the Florida stone crab, is often served baked, or in another dish called crab fat and dough. The clawless spiny lobster is also known as rock lobster and sometimes referred to as crayfish. Grouper is often served fried, sautéed, grilled or, more traditionally, boiled (called boiled fish) and offered with grits or Johnny cake. Bonefish, found in great numbers in Bahamian waters, is served baked.

Fish may be served escabeche-style, in a mixture of lime juice or vinegar with seasoning. In escabeche the fish is cooked first, differentiating it from the similarly prepared ceviche. "Stewed fish" is a method of preparing fish with celery, onions, potatoes, tomatoes and spices.

== Meat ==
Popular meat dishes are made with chicken, pork, and goat (also referred to as mutton). Iguana is still hunted and eaten, especially in the outlying islands, although some species, such as the Northern Bahamian rock iguana, are endangered.

An inexpensive dish, known locally as "Fire Engine", consists of steamed, canned corned beef served with either grits or white rice.

== Side dishes ==
Bahamian side dishes shared with the American South include grits, baked macaroni and cheese, coleslaw, potato salad, boiled vegetables, and Johnny cake. Other more traditional Caribbean side dishes include pigeon peas, fried plantain, peas and rice and cassava bread. Salt pork is also served.

== Seasonings ==
Bahamian dishes are frequently seasoned with Old Sour sauce, especially fish dishes.

== Fruit ==
Bahamian cuisine incorporates many tropical fruits. Guavas are used to make duff, a dessert. Ice cream is popular, including fruit flavors such as soursop. Puddings are eaten, including a sapodilla pudding. Papaya (called "pawpaw" or "melon tree") is used in desserts, chutneys, "Goombay" marmalade (made with papaya, pineapple, and green ginger), or simply eaten fresh at breakfast. Papaya is also used as a meat tenderizer, and in tropical drinks such as the Bahama Mama. Melons, pineapples, passionfruit, and mangoes are also grown in America.

== Desserts ==
Bahamians enjoy a variety of desserts, including tarts (coconut and pineapple), guava duff, bread pudding, rum cake and cornmeal pudding. Fruit cake is eaten during the Christmas holiday.

== See also ==
- Caribbean cuisine
- Cuisine of the Southern United States
