= Sky juice =

Bahamian cuisine beverage

Sky juice is a Bahamian cuisine beverage combining coconut water or coconut milk, condensed milk or evaporated milk, and alcohol (especially gin but rum can be used as a substitute). Nutmeg and cinnamon can spice it up.

In Malaysia, sky juice is slang for plain water.
