= Ducana =

Caribbean sweet potato dumpling

- Alternative names: Dukana, Dukanoo, Duckunoo, Conkie
- Type: Dumpling or Dessert
- Place of origin: Caribbean
- Created by: Indigenuous Ameridians, adopted by descendants of Africa
- Main ingredients: Sweet potatoes, sugar, flour, coconut, water, raisins, nutmeg, salt, vanilla extract
- Variations: Tie-a-leaf or blue drawers (Jamaica); Belizean ducunu or tamalito; Sweet tamale or tamal dulce (Latin America)

Ducana is a sweet potato dumpling or pudding from Antigua, Saint Kitts and Nevis, Saint Vincent and the Grenadines, Jamaica and many other Caribbean islands.

They are made from grated sweet potatoes, grated coconut, sugar, flour, coconut milk, and/or water, raisins, ginger, grated nutmeg, salt and essence or vanilla extract. The mixture is combined in a bowl until it thickly coats the back of a spoon. The cooking method is quite simple, but what is often debated is the wrapping. The mixture can be cooked wrapped in foil where others prefer to cook it wrapped in coccoloba leaves, banana leaves, or seaside grape leaves. Either way the wrapped contents must be boiled in salted water for about 25 minutes or until the mixture in the wrapping is firm.

Ducana is often served with salt cod (bacala) and what the islanders call "chop-up" which is a mixture of spinach, eggplant and okra. Ducana is also eaten cold, or thinly sliced and fried lightly.

== See also ==
- Duckanoo
