= Nassau Royale =

Liqueur made by Bacardi

Nassau Royale is a liqueur made by Bacardi. It is popular in Nassau, Bahamas, and Bahamian cuisine. The liqueur is used with whipped bananas and cream to top the Banana Royal dessert.
