= Duff (dessert) =

Dessert from the Bahamas

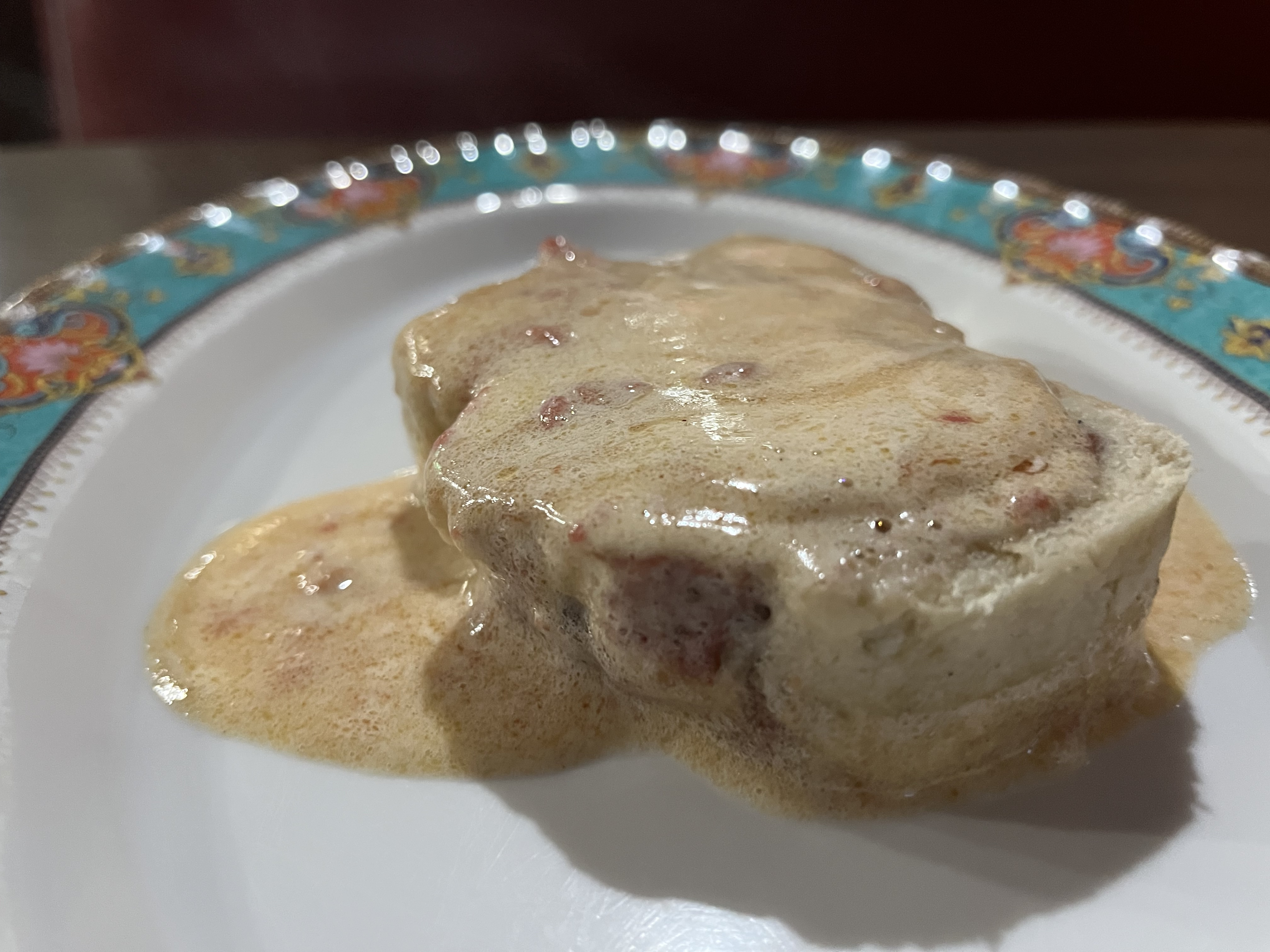
Guava duff

Duff is a Bahamian cuisine dessert dish made with fruit (especially guava) in a dough. Fruit is folded into the dough and boiled, then served with a sauce. Ingredients include fruit, butter, sugar, eggs, nutmeg, cinnamon, cloves, flour, rum, pepper, and baking powder.

Duff is also an English term for pudding. Examples are Christmas duff, plum duff and suet duff.

In the 1901 short story by Henry Lawson, "The Ghosts of Many Christmases", published in Children of the Bush, plum pudding is referred to both as pudding and duff:

The storekeeper had sent them an unbroken case of canned plum pudding, and probably by this time he was wondering what had become of that blanky case of duff.

== See also ==
- Bahamian cuisine
