= Anguillian cuisine =

Cuisine of Anguilla

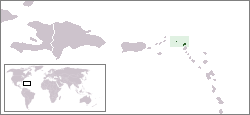
Location of Anguilla

Anguillian cuisine is the cuisine of Anguilla, a British overseas territory in the Caribbean, one of the most northerly of the Leeward Islands in the Lesser Antilles. The cuisine is influenced by native Caribbean, West African, Spanish, French and English cuisines.

== Meats ==
=== Seafood ===
Seafood is abundant, and includes prawns, shrimp, crab, spiny lobster, conch, mahi-mahi, red snapper, marlin and grouper. Salt cod is a staple food eaten by itself and used in stews, casseroles and soups.

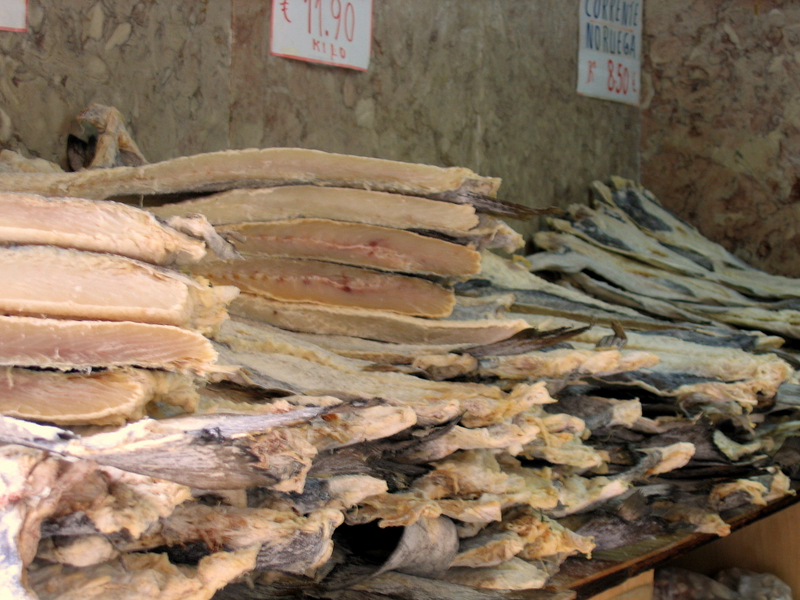
Salt cod is an Anguillian staple food

=== Livestock ===
Livestock is limited due to the small size of the island, and people there utilize poultry, pork, goat and mutton, along with imported beef. Goat is the most commonly eaten meat, and is utilized in a variety of dishes. A significant amount of the island's produce is imported due to limited land suitable for agriculture production; much of the soil is sandy and infertile.

== Fruits, vegetables and starches ==
Among the agriculture produced in Anguilla includes tomatoes, peppers, limes and other citrus fruits, onion, garlic, squash, pigeon peas and callalloo, a leaf green native to Africa. Starch staple foods include imported rice and other foods that are locally grown or imported, including yams, sweet potatoes and breadfruit. Potatoes are also consumed, although less frequently than other starches. Flour and cornmeal are also starches used in Anguillian cuisine.

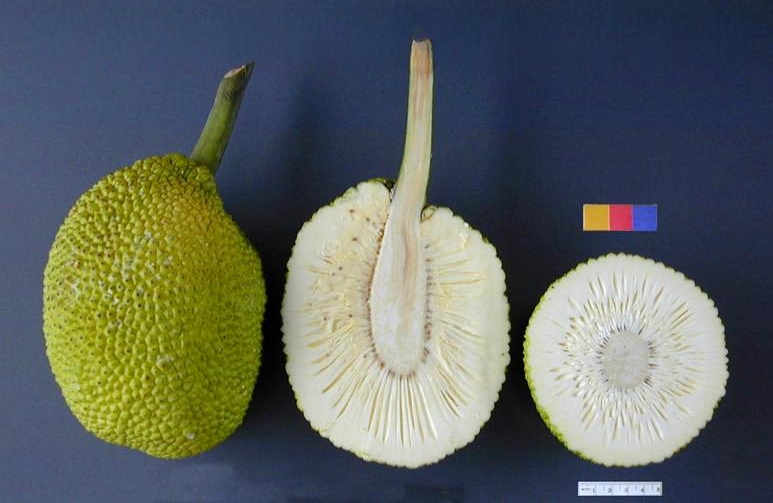
The fruit of the breadfruit tree – whole, sliced lengthwise and in cross-section

== Common foods and dishes ==
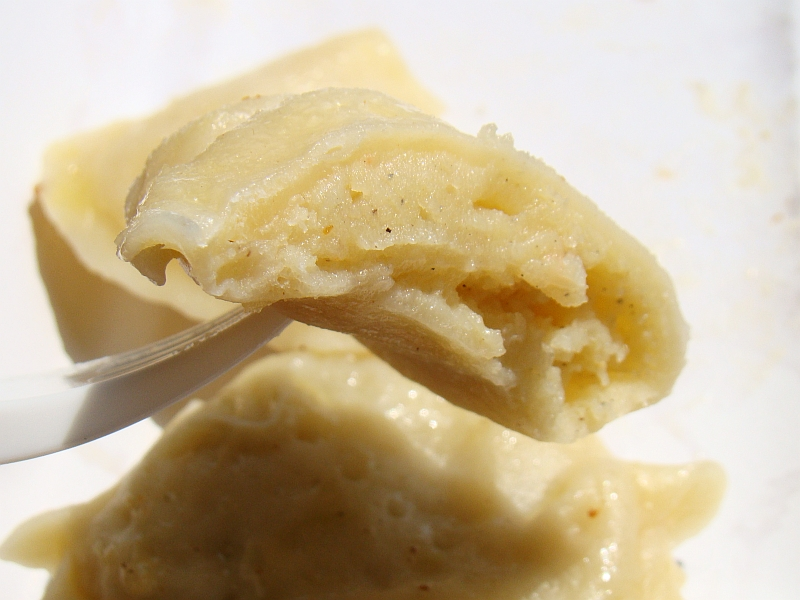
Dumplings

- Barbecue and jerk style meats
- Callalloo – a stew made with callalloo greens
- Fritters made with conch, coconut, fruit and other ingredients, seasoned with local allspice and sugar
- Dumplings
- Seafood soups and bisques made with lobster, conch, and fish
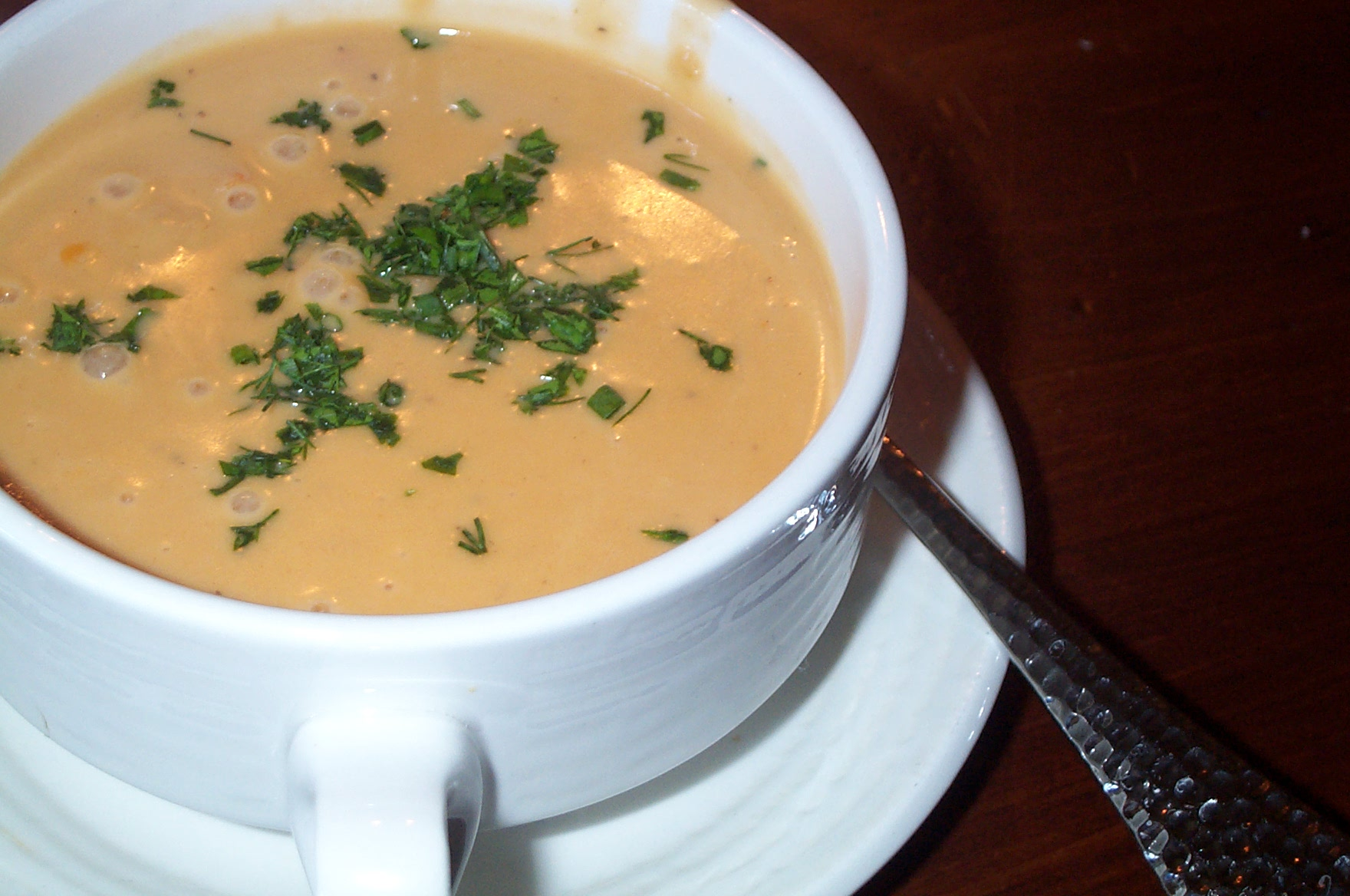
A bowl of lobster bisque

== Beverages ==
- Rum

== See also ==
- Caribbean cuisine
