= Belmont, Antigua and Barbuda =

Coordinates: 17°06′N 61°50′W

Belmont
- Village
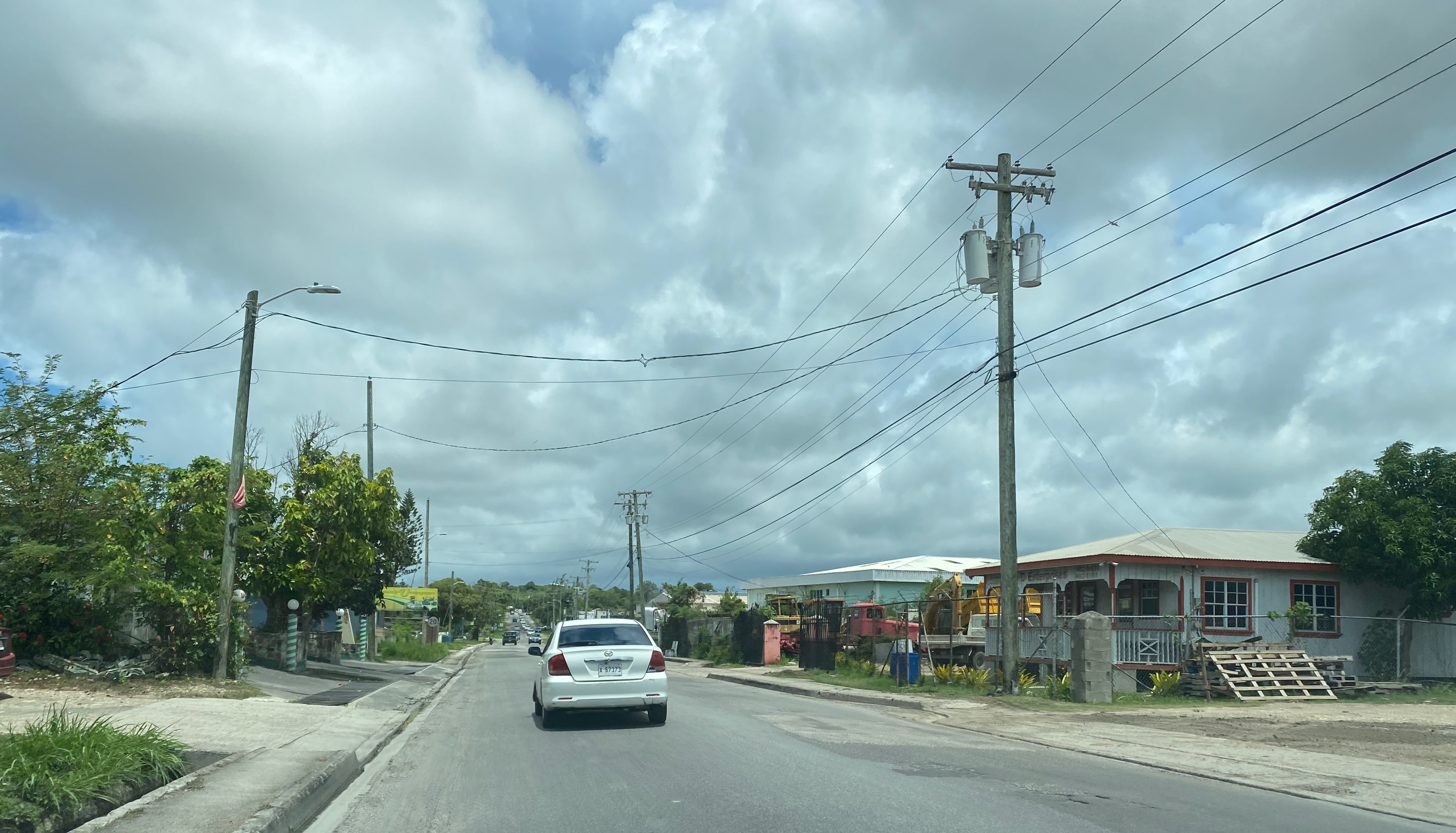
- Belmont in 2023

- Location within Antigua and Barbuda
- Country: Antigua and Barbuda
- Island: Antigua
- Civil parish: Saint John Parish

Government
  - Type: Former Village Council

Population (2011)
  - Total: 677
- Time zone: UTC-4 (AST)

Belmont is a village in Saint John Parish, Antigua and Barbuda.

== History ==
=== Belmont's Estate ===
The initial owner, Lt. Col. Bastian Baijer, received 500 acres in the St. John's Division from the governor at the time. Governor Keynell also gave him an extra 18 acres, and he also acquired 728 acres in the Popeshead Division and an additional 140 acres. St. John's "ran out" 25 feet of the Colonel's south side property, which he had possessed since April 11, 1688, according to a surveyor. His attorney, W. Hinde, Esq., demonstrated that Robert Hollingworth had given him the land.

The senior John Otto Baijer was baptized in St. John's in 1703 and went on to acquire Belmont, Otto's Estate (#16), Five Islands (#31), and Cooke's Estate (#26) as well as other properties. Afterwards, Daniel Burr Garling purchased Otto's and Belmont.

Belmont got a £2,386 legacy award from the British Parliament for freeing 160 slaves. William Musgrave, William Shand, and Chles Wollaston received the honors.

The estates of Admiral Tollemach (Weatherill's #5), Gambles (#14), Delaps (#137), and other properties were managed by William Bertie Wolseley (d. 1881). Bertie lived at Weatherill's for a while before relocating to Belmont/in Murray's 1828. In 1835, he may have held property and got payment of £159 for freeing 11 slaves.

The 1941 sugar crop yielded, from 200 acres cultivated by peasants on the Belmont/Estate, Murray's was estimated at 813 tons; 569 tons of sugarcane were delivered.

== Demographics ==
Belmont has two enumeration districts.

- 33401 Belmont_1
- 33402 Belmont_2

=== Census data ===
| Q48 Ethnic | Counts | % |
|---|---|---|
| African descendent | 613 | 90.54% |
| Caucasian/White | 3 | 0.49% |
| Mixed (Black/White) | 3 | 0.49% |
| Mixed (Other) | 34 | 5.06% |
| Hispanic | 1 | 0.16% |
| Syrian/Lebanese | 17 | 2.45% |
| Other | 1 | 0.16% |
| Don't know/Not stated | 4 | 0.65% |
| Total | 677 | 100.00% |

| Q49 Religion | Counts | % |
|---|---|---|
| Adventist | 74 | 11.00% |
| Anglican | 137 | 20.36% |
| Baptist | 17 | 2.46% |
| Church of God | 17 | 2.46% |
| Evangelical | 35 | 5.25% |
| Jehovah Witness | 8 | 1.15% |
| Methodist | 30 | 4.43% |
| Moravian | 56 | 8.37% |
| Nazarene | 21 | 3.12% |
| None/no religion | 36 | 5.42% |
| Pentecostal | 76 | 11.33% |
| Rastafarian | 10 | 1.48% |
| Roman Catholic | 64 | 9.52% |
| Weslyan Holiness | 41 | 6.08% |
| Other | 11 | 1.64% |
| Don't know/Not stated | 40 | 5.91% |
| Total | 672 | 100.00% |
| NotApp : | 4 | |

| Q55 Internet Use | Counts | % |
|---|---|---|
| Yes | 364 | 53.83% |
| No | 285 | 42.09% |
| Don't know/Not stated | 28 | 4.08% |
| Total | 677 | 100.00% |

| Q58. Country of birth | Counts | % |
|---|---|---|
| Africa | 1 | 0.16% |
| Other Latin or North American countries | 2 | 0.33% |
| Antigua and Barbuda | 486 | 71.78% |
| Other Caribbean countries | 3 | 0.49% |
| Canada | 1 | 0.16% |
| Dominica | 28 | 4.08% |
| Guyana | 39 | 5.71% |
| Jamaica | 24 | 3.59% |
| Monsterrat | 13 | 1.96% |
| St. Kitts and Nevis | 4 | 0.65% |
| St. Lucia | 2 | 0.33% |
| St. Vincent and the Grenadines | 8 | 1.14% |
| Syria | 11 | 1.63% |
| Trinidad and Tobago | 6 | 0.82% |
| United Kingdom | 7 | 0.98% |
| USA | 28 | 4.08% |
| USVI United States Virgin Islands | 6 | 0.82% |
| Not Stated | 9 | 1.31% |
| Total | 677 | 100.00% |

| Q71 Country of Citizenship 1 | Counts | % |
|---|---|---|
| Antigua and Barbuda | 585 | 86.46% |
| Other Caribbean countries | 6 | 0.82% |
| Other Asian and Middle Eastern countries | 9 | 1.31% |
| Dominica | 7 | 0.98% |
| Guyana | 22 | 3.26% |
| Jamaica | 13 | 1.96% |
| Monsterrat | 7 | 0.98% |
| St. Lucia | 2 | 0.33% |
| St. Vincent and the Grenadines | 4 | 0.65% |
| Trinidad and Tobago | 1 | 0.16% |
| USA | 11 | 1.63% |
| Other countries | 3 | 0.49% |
| Not Stated | 7 | 0.98% |
| Total | 677 | 100.00% |

| Q71 Country of Citizenship 2 (Country of Second Citizenship) | Counts | % |
|---|---|---|
| Other Caribbean countries | 4 | 4.21% |
| Canada | 1 | 1.05% |
| Other Asian and Middle Eastern countries | 2 | 2.11% |
| Dominica | 21 | 20.00% |
| Guyana | 15 | 14.74% |
| Jamaica | 9 | 8.42% |
| Monsterrat | 4 | 4.21% |
| St. Vincent and the Grenadines | 4 | 4.21% |
| Trinidad and Tobago | 2 | 2.11% |
| United Kingdom | 12 | 11.58% |
| USA | 27 | 25.26% |
| Other countries | 2 | 2.11% |
| Total | 105 | 100.00% |
| NotApp : | 572 | |
