= Conch soup =

Soup eaten in the Florida Keys and the Caribbean

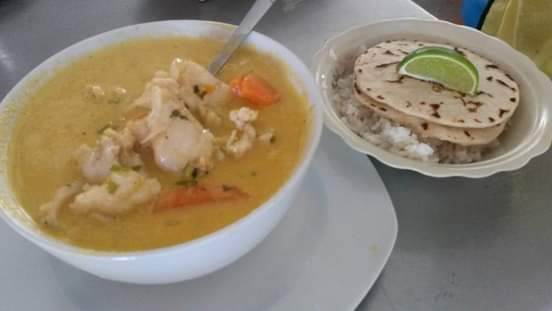
Sopa de caracol

Conch soup and conch chowder are soup dishes made with conch that are traditional in various Caribbean island cuisines as well as the cuisine of Honduras. Conch chowder is also a traditional food of the Florida Keys.
