= Saint Lucian cuisine =

Culinary traditions of Saint Lucia

Saint Lucian cuisine is a combination of French, East Indian and British dishes. Before colonization, Kalinago and Arawakan-speaking peoples occupied the island, surviving on its various natural fruits and vegetables like mangoes, oranges, tangerines, avocados, and breadfruit.

== Specialties ==
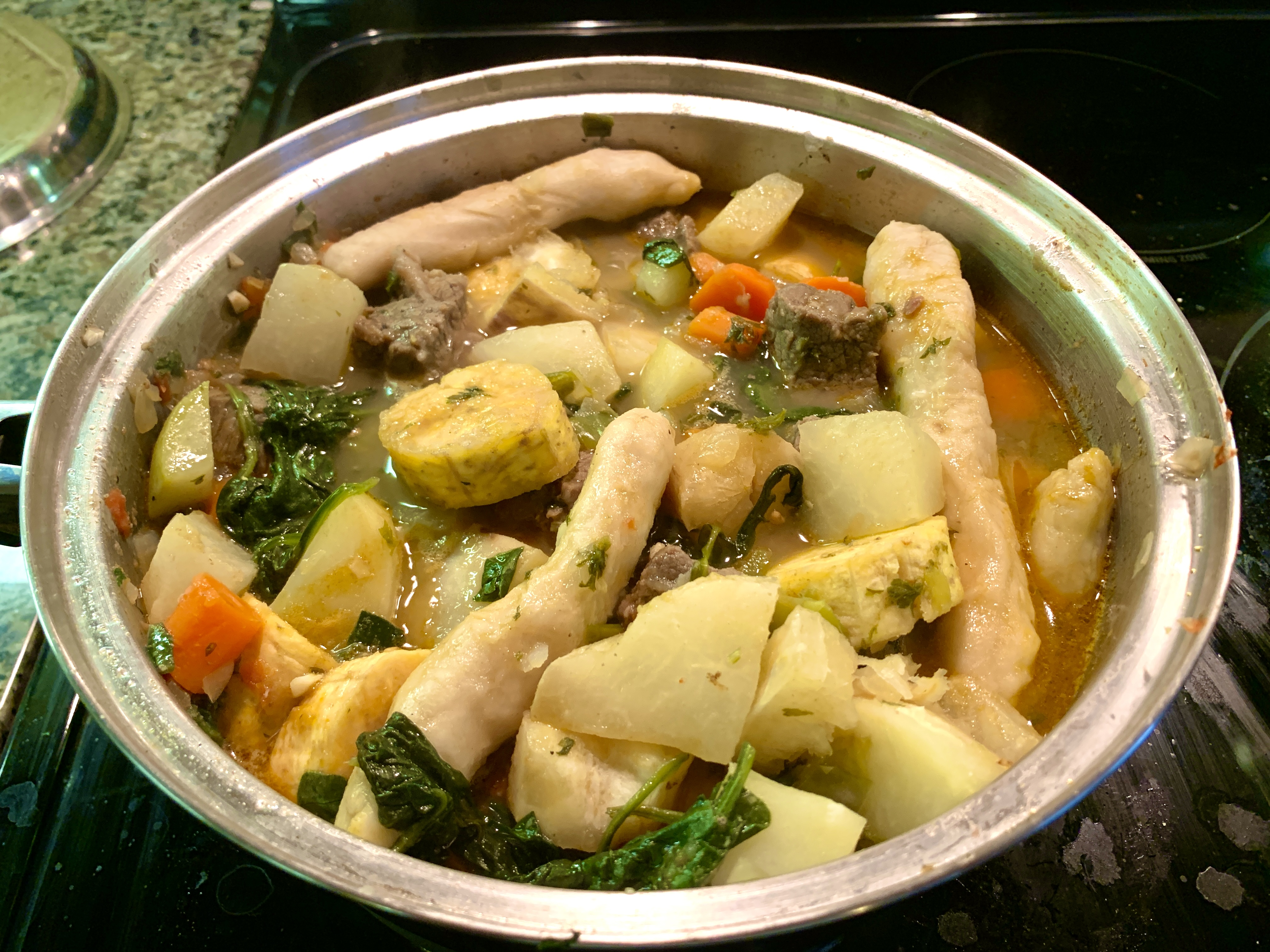
Bouyon

St Lucia is known for its national dish consisting of green bananas and saltfish locally known as "green figs and saltfish"; breadfruit and saltfish is an alternative favourite among the locals.

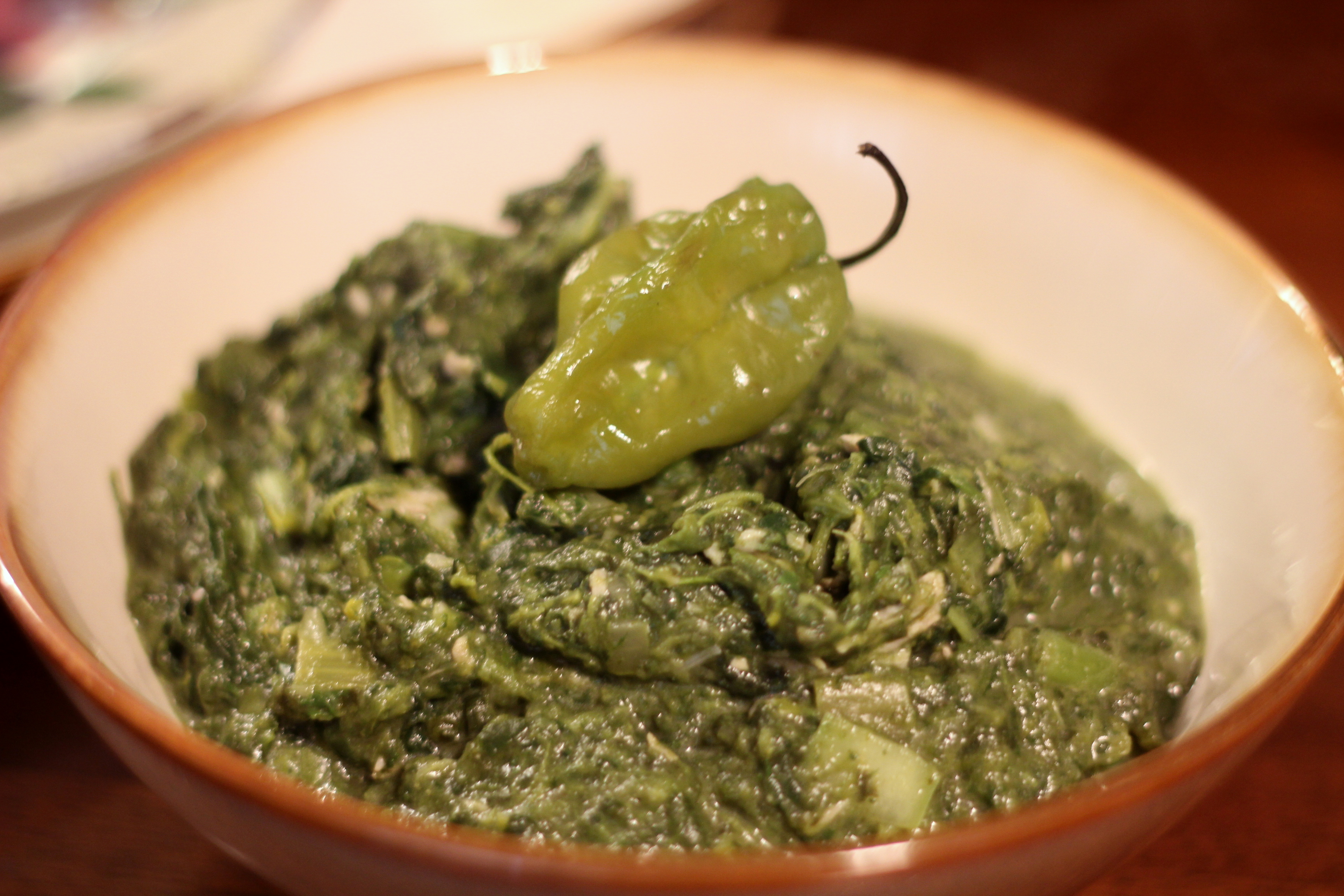
Callaloo

Other speciality dishes include bouyon, a thick red beans one-pot soup meal made of meat, ground provisions (ground tuber foods) and vegetables. Other popular local dishes include callaloo soup, accra (a fried snack composed of flour, egg, seasoning and the main ingredient of saltfish, usually prepared around Easter), green fig salad (actually made with green bananas), cocoa tea (a traditional breakfast spiced hot drink) and bakes (fried bread, also referred to as "floats") among others.

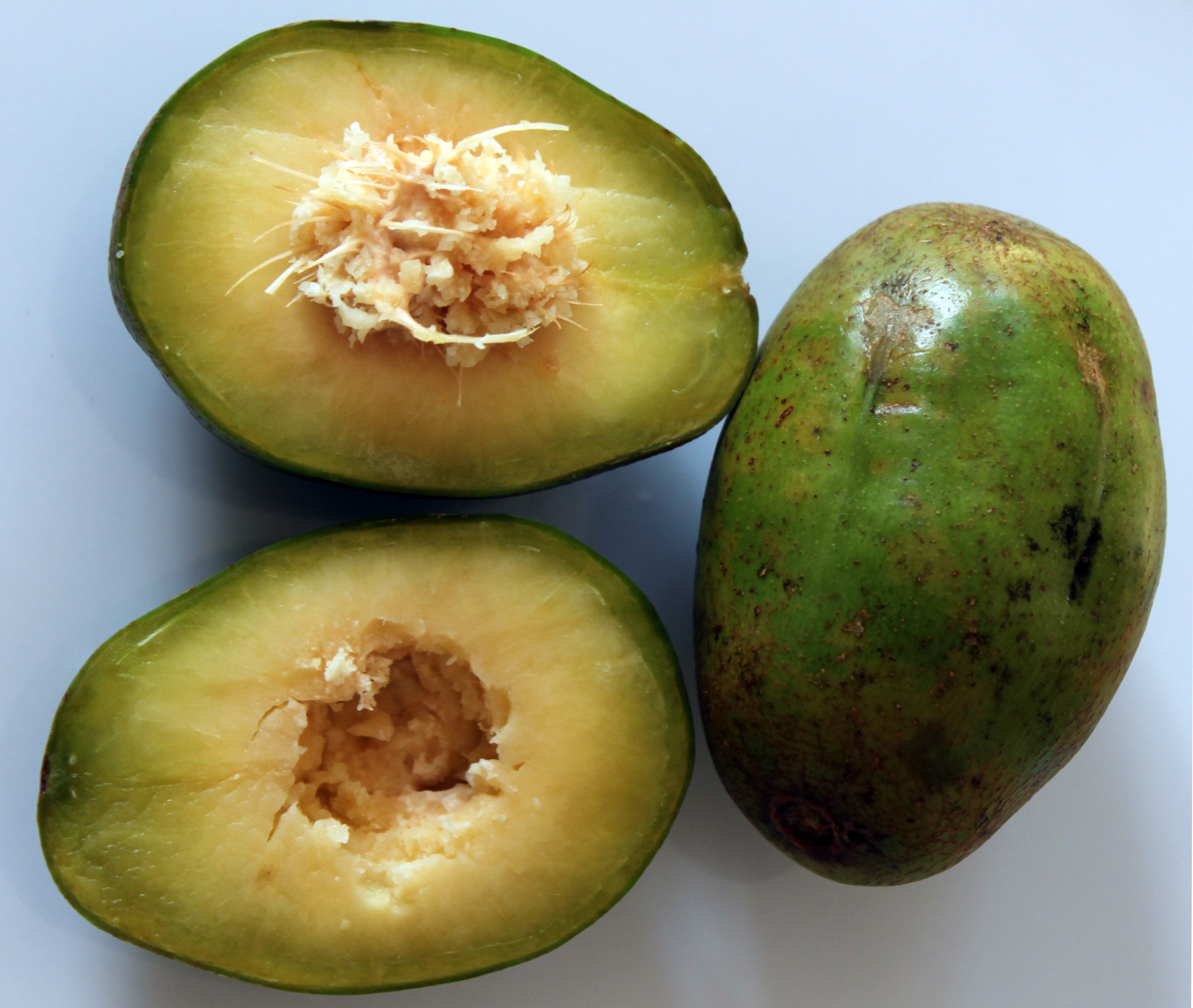
Golden apple

The island's British and Indian influences are seen in the variety of spices used in its cuisine, which include garlic, cinnamon, nutmeg, cocoa, parsley, cloves, and allspice. A wide range of local fruits like golden apples, mangoes, starfruit, and tamarind are used to make juices, although lime juice (lime squash) seems a more popular choice to be enjoyed in conjunction with the local specialties.

== See also ==
- Piton (beer)
- Tourism in Saint Lucia
- Caribbean cuisine
