= Goombay Smash =

Rum-based beverage from the Bahamas

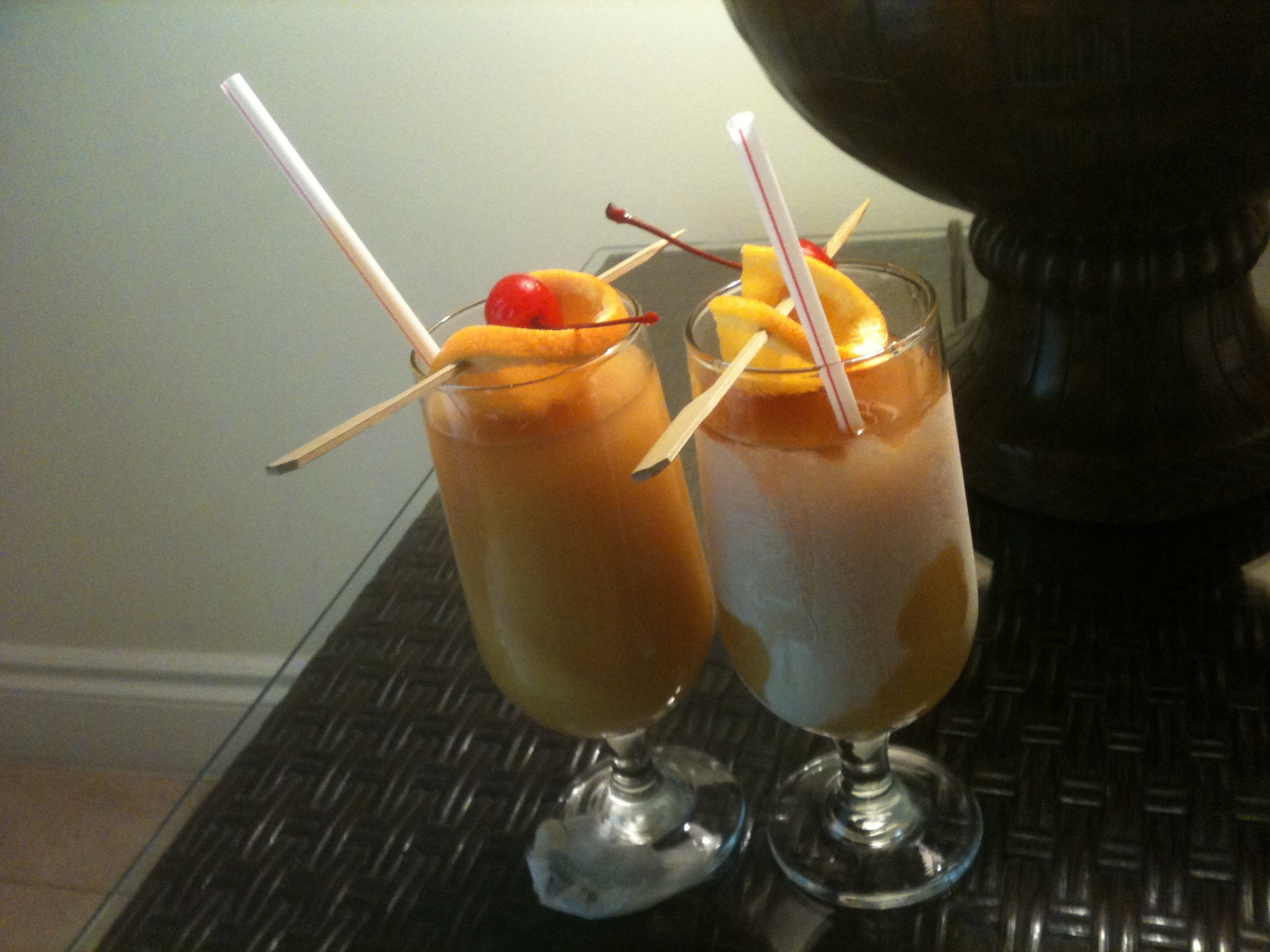

Goombay Smash is a rum based beverage in the Bahamas. It is traditionally served in a sling or collins glass. The Goombay Smash was created by Emily Cooper, aka Miss Emily, at the Blue Bee Bar in New Plymouth. The original recipe is a secret, but it is believed to have contained coconut rum, dirty rum, apricot brandy, and pineapple juice. Imitators and variations commonly use rum, coconut and pineapple juice. Apricot liqueur is sometimes used and dark, amber or spiced rums (dirty rums) are preferred. In place of coconut rum, coconut cream can be used. Other variations include Creme de Banane, orange juice and grenadine.

== See also ==
- Goombay
- Bahamian cuisine
