= Cuisine of the Turks and Caicos Islands =

The Turks and Caicos Islands consist of 30 islands situated in the Atlantic Ocean, southeast of the Bahamas. Local cuisine employs local seafood, bananas, citrus, corn and ocean salt. Because the territories are situated in the Caribbean zone and belong to the United Kingdom, many elements from these cultures can be found in the local fusion cuisine.

The variety of meat ranges from fish, fish roe, crabs, and lobster, to poultry, pork and beef. Meat is typically served with local corn, rice and vegetables and is topped with local sauces and spices.

A traditional Turks and Caicos meal comprises grits, which are made with dried conch or peas, various local vegetables, and chicken or fish. Conch is present in a large number of dishes including conch salad, conch fritters, and cracked conch. Rum is an important drink and flavoring for cakes and even steaks. A rum-based punch is served during celebrations, and is a popular drink in the coastal bars and eateries.

These islands host approximately 50,000 tourists per year, so the local cuisine has to accommodate the tourist trade. In Cockburn Town, cafes and open bars on the coast produce fish and seafood dishes, as well as exotic desserts.
