= Saint Barthélemy cuisine =

Culinary traditions of Saint Barthélemy

Saint Barthélemy cuisine mainly revolves around French cuisine, West Indian cuisine, Creole cuisine, Italian cuisine and Asian cuisine. The island has over 70 restaurants serving many dishes and others are a significant number of gourmet restaurants; many of the finest restaurants are located in the hotels. There are also a number of snack restaurants which the French call "les snacks" or "les petits creux" which include sandwiches, pizzas and salads. West Indian cuisine, steamed vegetables with fresh fish is common; Creole dishes tend to be spicier. The island hosts gastronomic events throughout the year, with dishes such as spring roll of shrimp and bacon, fresh grilled lobster, Chinese noodle salad with coconut milk, and grilled beef fillet.

== Bibliography ==
- Sullivan, Lynne M. (13 March 2003). Adventure Guide to St. Martin & St. Barts. Hunter Publishing, Inc. ISBN 978-1-58843-348-0.
