= Honduran cuisine =

Culinary tradition

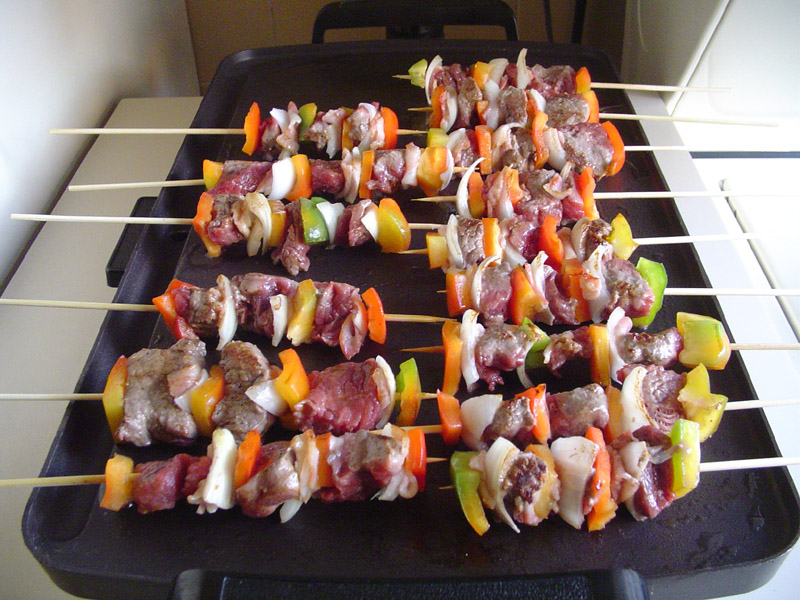
Pinchos americanos are served often in Honduras.

Honduran cuisine is a fusion of Mesoamerican, Spanish, Caribbean and African cuisines. Coconut and coconut milk are featured in both sweet and savory dishes. Regional specialties include sopa de caracol, fried fish, tamales, carne asada and baleadas. Other commonly served dishes include meat roasted with chismol and carne asada, chicken with rice and corn, and fried fish with pickled onions and jalapeños. In the coastal areas and the Bay Islands, seafood and some meats are prepared in many ways, including with coconut milk. Among the soups the Hondurans prepare and eat often are bean soup, mondongo soup (tripe soup), seafood soups, and beef soups. Generally all of these soups are mixed with plantains, yuca, and cabbage, and served with corn tortillas.

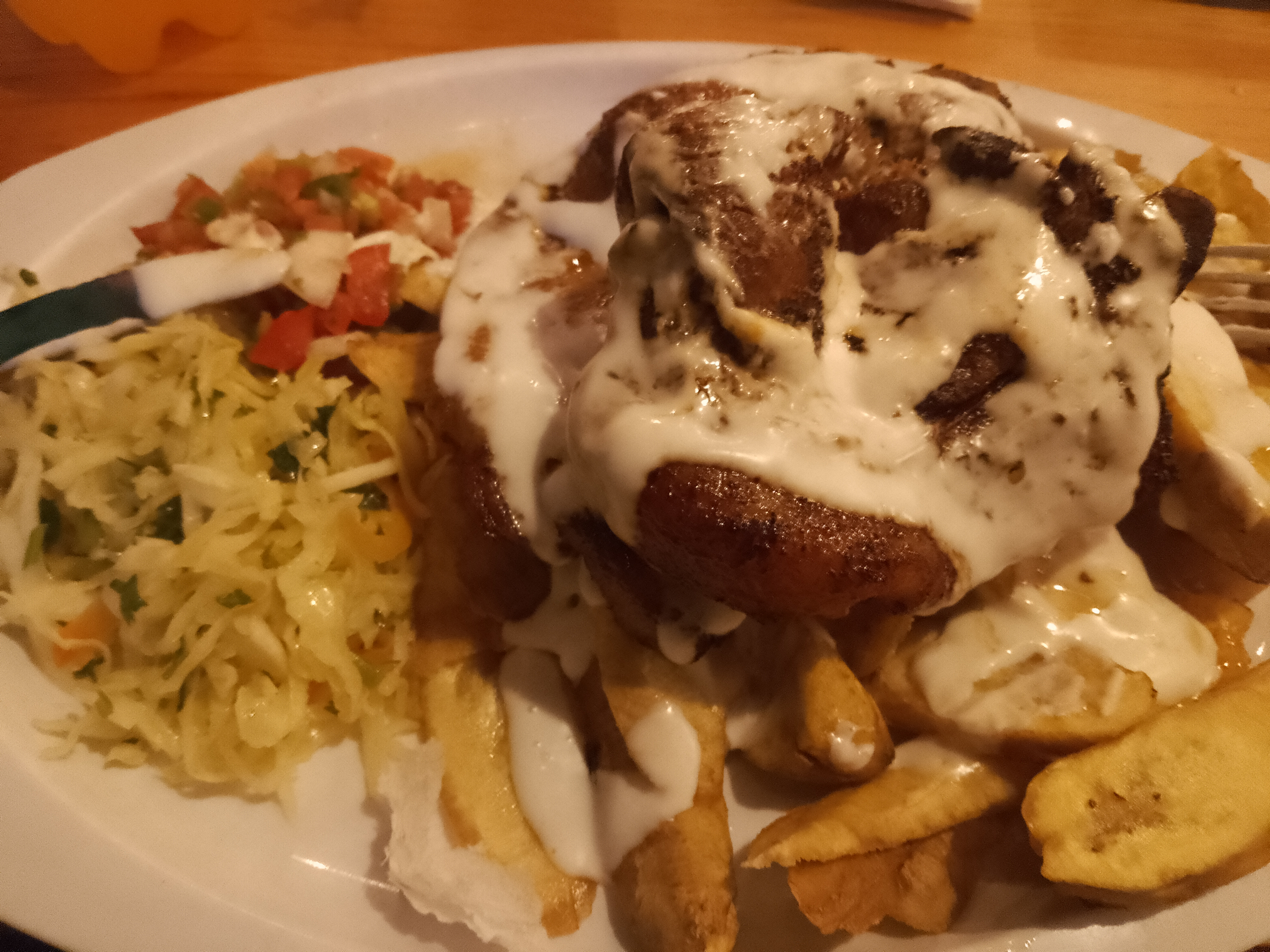
Pork chop with plantain chips

Other typical dishes are montucas or corn tamales, stuffed tortillas, and tamales wrapped in plantain leaves. Typical Honduran dishes also include a wide variety of tropical fruits such as papaya, pineapple, plum, sapote, passion fruit, and bananas, which are prepared in many ways while they are still green.

Common beverages served with dinner or lunch include soft drinks, agua de nance and horchata. A well-known domestic bottled soft drink is banana-flavored Tropical Banana.

== History ==
=== Precolumbian cuisine ===
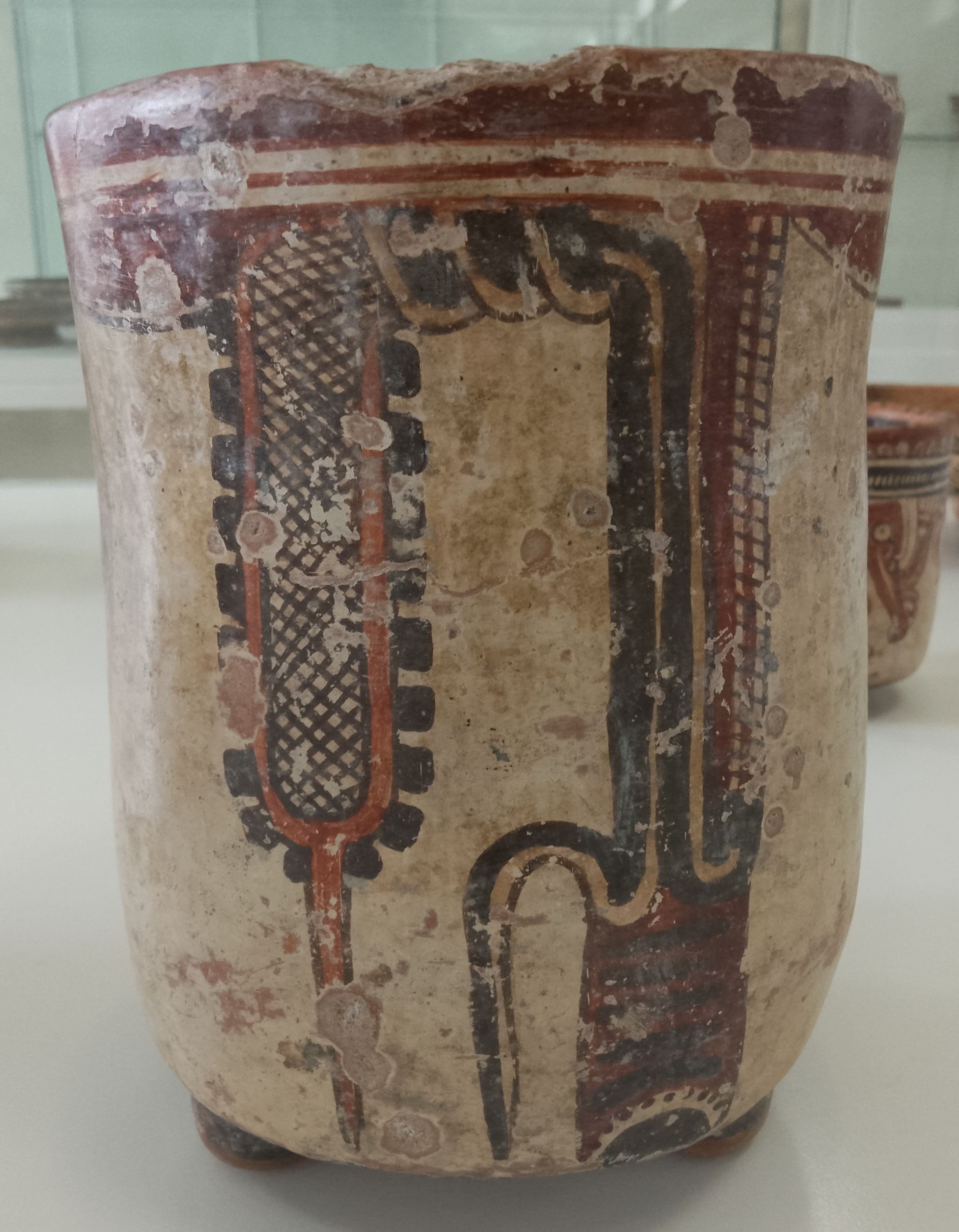
Lenca vessel from the Classic period depicting an ear of corn in its sheath

The gastronomy of Honduras before the conquest was based on the consumption of grains such as corn, beans, and cocoa, and crops such as pumpkins, chili peppers, tomatoes, and several types of squash. Pre-Hispanic peoples also consumed the meat of the guajolote, fish, and some mammals like deer as well as other products like honey and various fruits such as pineapples and papaya for the preparation of various desserts and drinks.

=== Colonial fusion ===
This would be the basis of the Honduran diet that would be mixed with Spanish cuisine, which brought with it the consumption of beef, sausage, oils, and wheat. The Iberian diet in Honduras gave a total change in the eating habits of the pre-Hispanic peoples, with the introduction of dairy products being the biggest change of these, from which the diverse type of cheeses and Honduran dishes that they carry in their recipes were derived.

=== Modern Honduran cuisine ===
Over the centuries, other ingredients have been contributed to the gastronomy of Honduras, such as African and foreign influences as well as international dishes thanks to the migration of various human groups to Honduras following the liberal reform.

== Breakfast ==
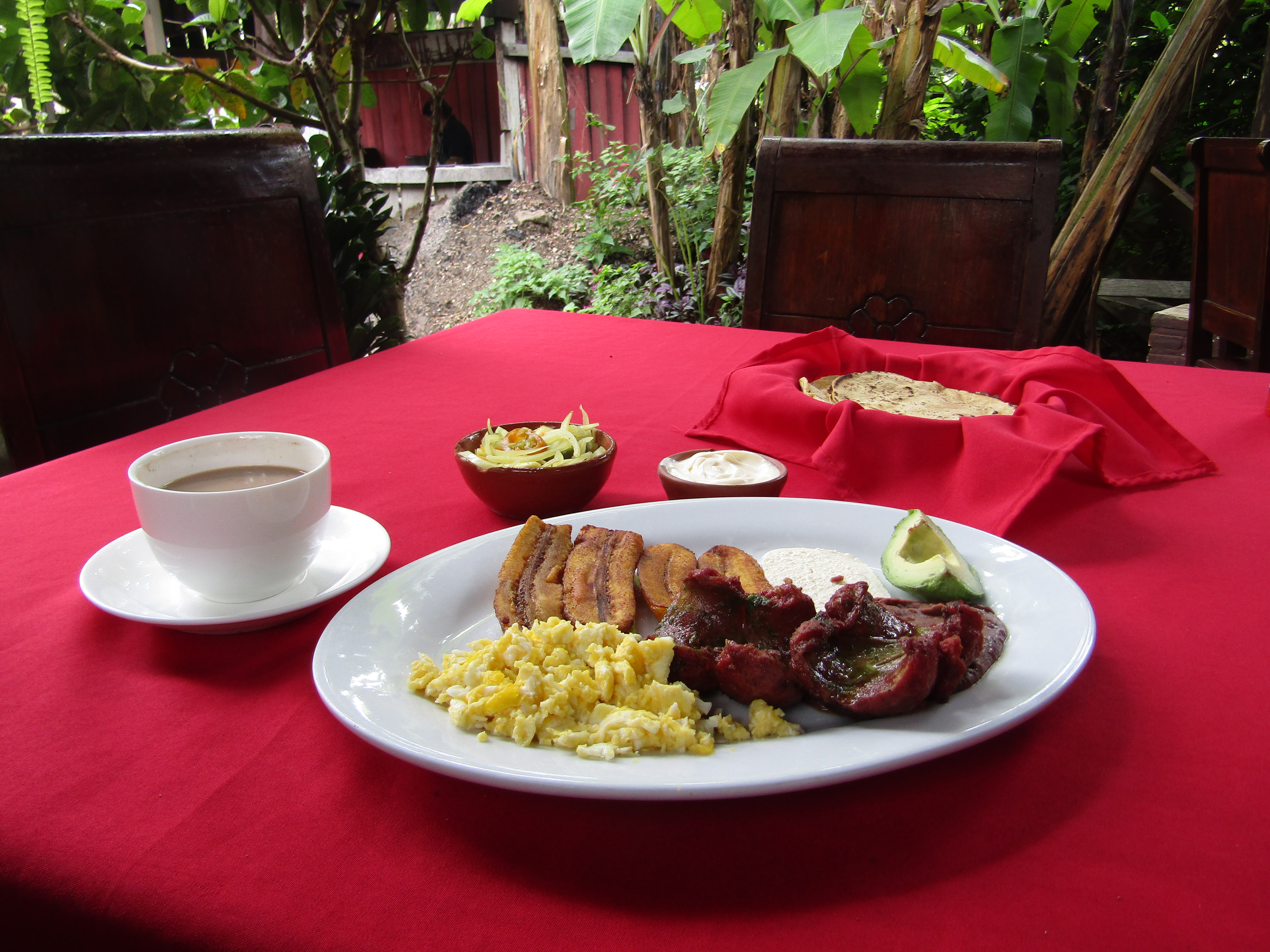
A Honduran breakfast

Hondurans usually have a large, hearty breakfast. It typically consists of fried eggs (whole or scrambled), refried beans, Honduran salty sour cream (crema), queso fresco, avocado, sweet fried plantains, and tortillas. It is common for most households to first prepare tortillas, a staple for nearly every dish, which are used throughout the rest of the day.

Other breakfast favorites include carne asada (roasted meat) and Honduran spicy sausages (chorizo). A good breakfast will be accompanied with hot, dark—in this case Honduran-grown—coffee. Honduran coffee is renowned for its delicate qualities, being grown on the slopes of the Honduran mountains in rich soils of volcanic origin. A specific brand famous for its flavor comes from the Honduran region of Marcala; others are the Copán coffee and the coffee grown in Ocotepeque.

Street vendors often sell breakfast baleadas made of flour tortillas, refried beans, and crema or queso fresco. Additional toppings include eggs, meat, and even pickled onions. Vendors sell small tamales made of sweet yellow corn dough, called tamalitos de elote, eaten with sour cream; fresh horchata and pozole is also common.

Another food that can be eaten for breakfast as a dessert is rosquillas. Rosquillas can be considered as a Honduran doughnut and are made from corn (masa, cheese and yeast).

== Sopa de caracol ==
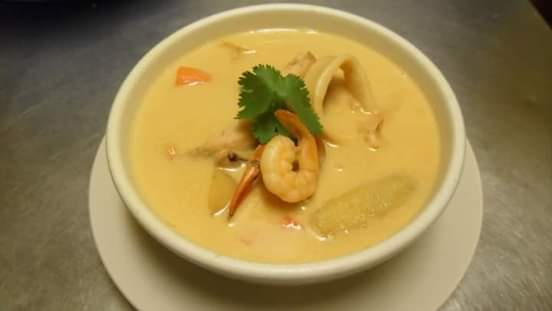
Sopa de caracol (conch soup)

Sopa de caracol (conch soup) is one of the most representative dishes of the Honduran cuisine. This soup was made famous throughout Latin America because of a catchy song from Banda Blanca called "Sopa de Caracol." The conch is cooked in coconut milk and the conch's broth, with spices, yuca (cassava), cilantro, and green bananas known as guineo verde. Other varieties including crab, fish or shrimp are known as sopa marinera.

== Sopa de frijoles ==
This traditional soup is made by boiling black or red beans with garlic in water until soft. Once they are soft, the beans are blended, and added to a pot filled with water and with pork bones to serve as the base of the soup. Once the soup base has taken a chocolate color and has been boiled enough, the bones are removed, and water is added to the pot, along with the rest of the ingredients, which may include yuca, green plantains, eggs, and many other ingredients. The soup is served with rice and tortillas, and may be accompanied by sour cream, smoked dry cheese, avocados, and lemons.

== Carneada ==
Carneada is considered one of Honduras' national dishes, known as plato típico when served in Honduran restaurants. While it is a type of dish, a carneada or carne asada, like its Mexican counterpart, is usually more of a social event with drinks and music centered on a feast of barbecued meat. The cuts of beef are usually marinated in sour orange juice, salt, pepper and spices, and then grilled.

The meat is usually accompanied by chismol salsa (made of chopped tomatoes, onion and cilantro with lemon and spices), roasted plátanos (sweet plantains), spicy chorizos, olanchano cheese, tortillas, and refried mashed beans.

== Rice and beans ==
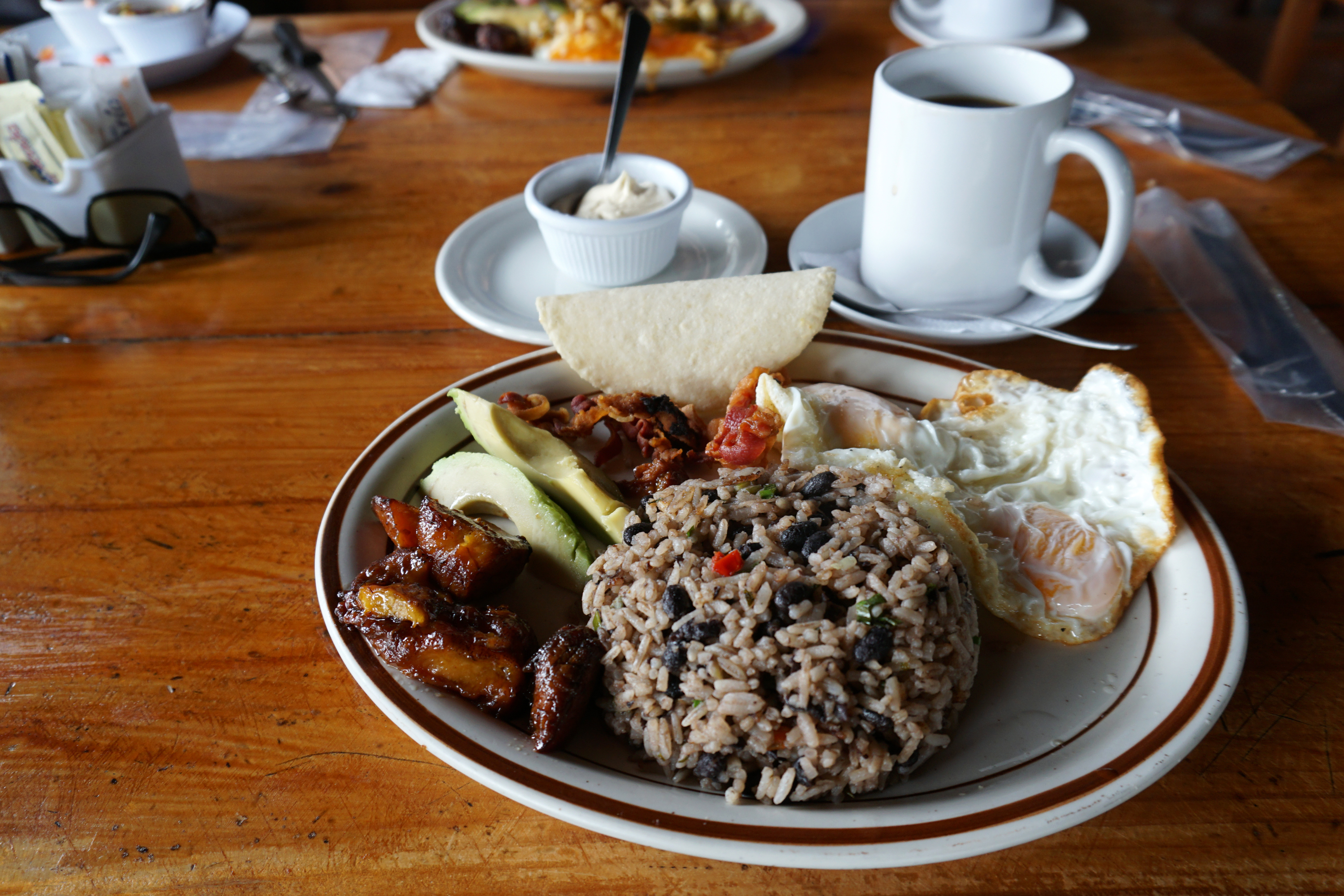
Casamiento, a rice and beans dish

Rice and beans is a popular side dish in the Honduran Caribbean coast. It is often called casamiento as in El Salvador. The most common beans used in Honduras are red beans (frijoles cheles). Typically in Honduras beans are refried and served with green fried bananas (tajadas).

== Fried Yojoa fish ==
Fried fish from Lake Yojoa

Fried Yojoa fish often has a more savory flavor compared to other types of fish served in the region. Yojoa fish is salted, spiced, and later deep-fried. It is frequently served with pickled red cabbage, pickled onions, and deep-fried sliced plantains (tajaditas).

== Baleada ==
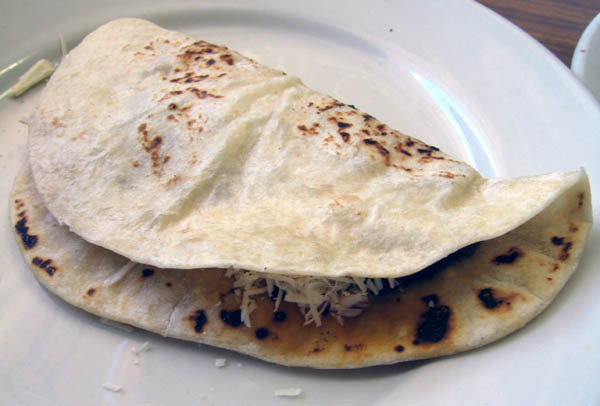
An homemade baleada with eggs, butter, cheese and beans

The baleada is one of the most common street foods in Honduras. The basic style is a flour tortilla, folded and filled with refried beans and queso fresco or sour cream (crema). Roasted meat, avocado, plantains or scrambled eggs may be added. Honduran fast-food chains serve different kinds of baleadas.

== Corn tortillas ==
Corn, or maíz, is a staple in Honduran cuisine. Eating corn comes to Hondurans as an inheritance from the Maya-Lenca people; the Maya believed corn to be sacred, and that the father gods created men from it.

Some tortilla-based dishes include tacos fritos, in which tortillas are filled in with ground meat or chicken and rolled into a flute. The rolled tacos are then deep-fried and served with raw cabbage, hot tomato sauce, cheese and sour cream as toppings.

Catrachitas are a common simple snack, made of deep-fried tortilla chips covered with mashed refried beans and cheese. Chilindrinas, deep-fried tortilla strips with hot tomato sauce and cheese, are a variant of this snack. It is common in Honduran restaurants to serve an anafre, a clay pot with melting cheese or sour cream, mashed beans and sometimes chopped chorizo heated on top of a clay container with burning charcoal, with fried tortilla chips for dipping.

Enchiladas: the whole tortilla is deep-fried and served with a variety of toppings. Ground pork is first to be placed on the tortilla, followed by raw chopped cabbage or lettuce, hot tomato sauce, and a slice of boiled egg.

Tortilla con quesillo: two tortillas with quesillo (a lightly salted cheese that can easily melt), in between and then pan-fried; served with a tomato sauce. Mashed beans are sometimes also added as a filling with the cheese. Chismol is sometimes on top.

== Condiments ==
Encurtido is used as an appetizer, side dish and condiment, and is a common dish in Honduran cuisine.

== Tegucigalpan cuisine ==
This refers to the cuisine and restaurants of the city of Tegucigalpa, Honduras. Rice, beans, and tortillas are a staple of the Honduran diet, and some would argue there is little difference in quality between the streetside vendors and top restaurants.

The city, like in most other places in Honduras, offers a wide variety of cuisines from not only Honduras but also Asia, India, the Middle East, and other regions. Tegucigalpa offers everything from street food to gourmet food in five-star restaurants. However, according to Frommer's, "Tegucigalpa's dining scene is considerably more varied when compared to the rest of the country, but lacks the quality and depth of other Latin American cities."
