= Cuisine of Montserrat =

National cuisine

Montserrat's national dish is goat water, a (not too thick or thin) goat meat stew (made from the meat of the male (ram) goat) and served with crispy bread rolls. It bears resemblance to the Irish stew and can be served with a variety of foods, such as bread, and rice.

The Montserrat cuisine resembles the general British and Caribbean one, as it is situated in the Caribbean zone and it is a British territory. The cuisine includes a wide range of light meats, like fish, seafood and chicken, which are mostly grilled, fried or roasted. It is a fusion of multiple cultures, including Spanish, French, African, Indian and Amerindian.

== Dishes ==
- Salt fish
- Mountain chicken - not actually chicken, but the leg from the giant ditch frog (Dominica is the only other island where these frogs can be found)
- Pumpkin soup
- Goat water (national dish)
- (Salt) Fish cakes
- Cassava bread
- Muffins (also known as Johnny cakes)
