= Antigua and Barbuda cuisine =

Culinary traditions of Antigua and Barbuda

Antigua and Barbuda cuisine refers to the cuisines of the Caribbean islands Antigua and Barbuda. The national dish is fungee (pronounced "foon-jee") and pepperpot. Fungee is a dish similar to Italian polenta, made mostly with cornmeal. Other local dishes include ducana, seasoned rice, saltfish and lobster (from Barbuda). There are also local confectioneries which include sugar cake, fudge, raspberry and tamarind stew, and peanut brittle.

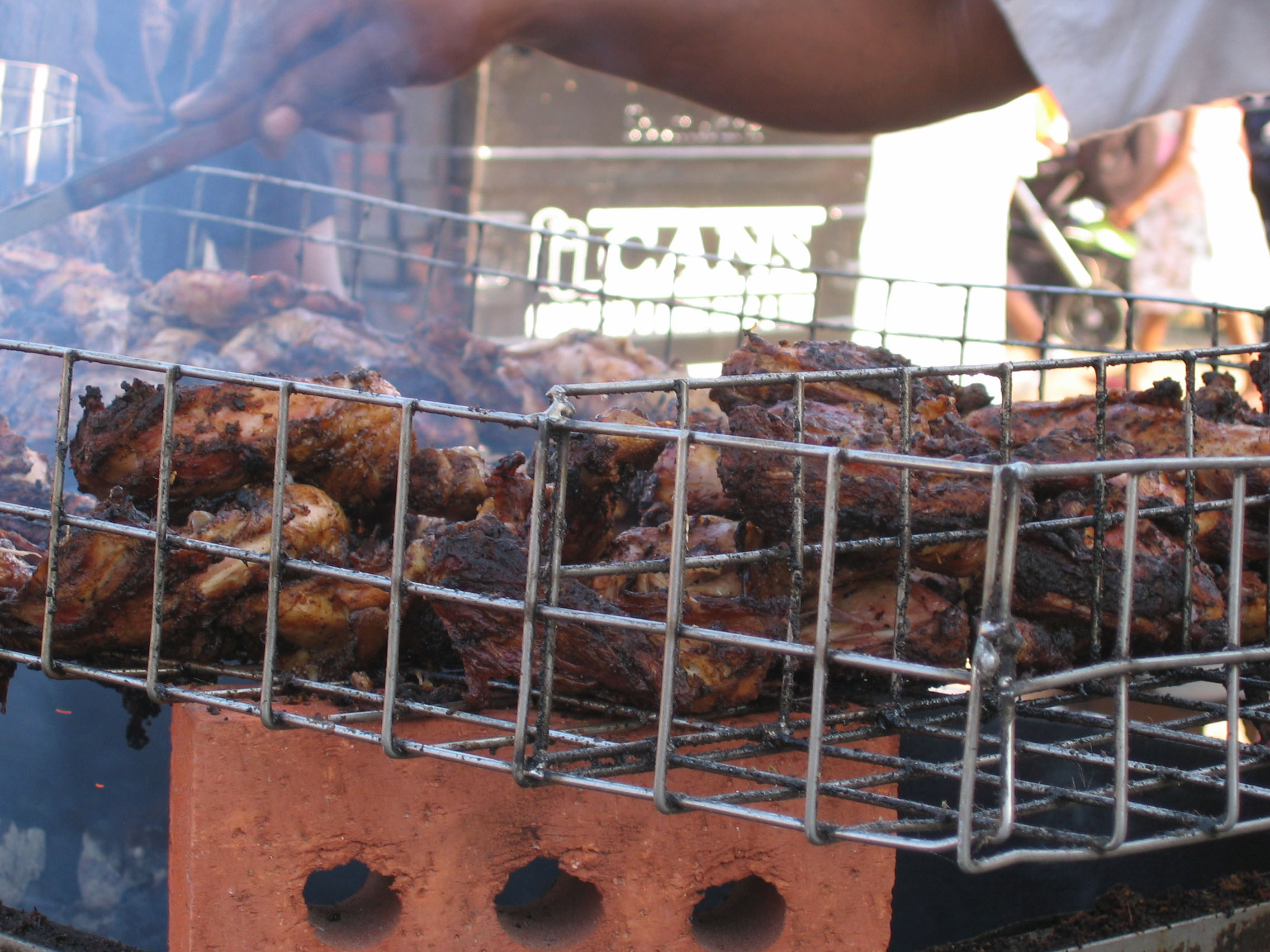
Jerk chicken cooking

These foods are indigenous to Antigua and Barbuda and to some other Caribbean countries, the local diet has diversified and includes local dishes of Jamaica, such as jerk meats, or Trinidad, such as roti, and specialties of other Caribbean countries.

== Common foods and dishes ==
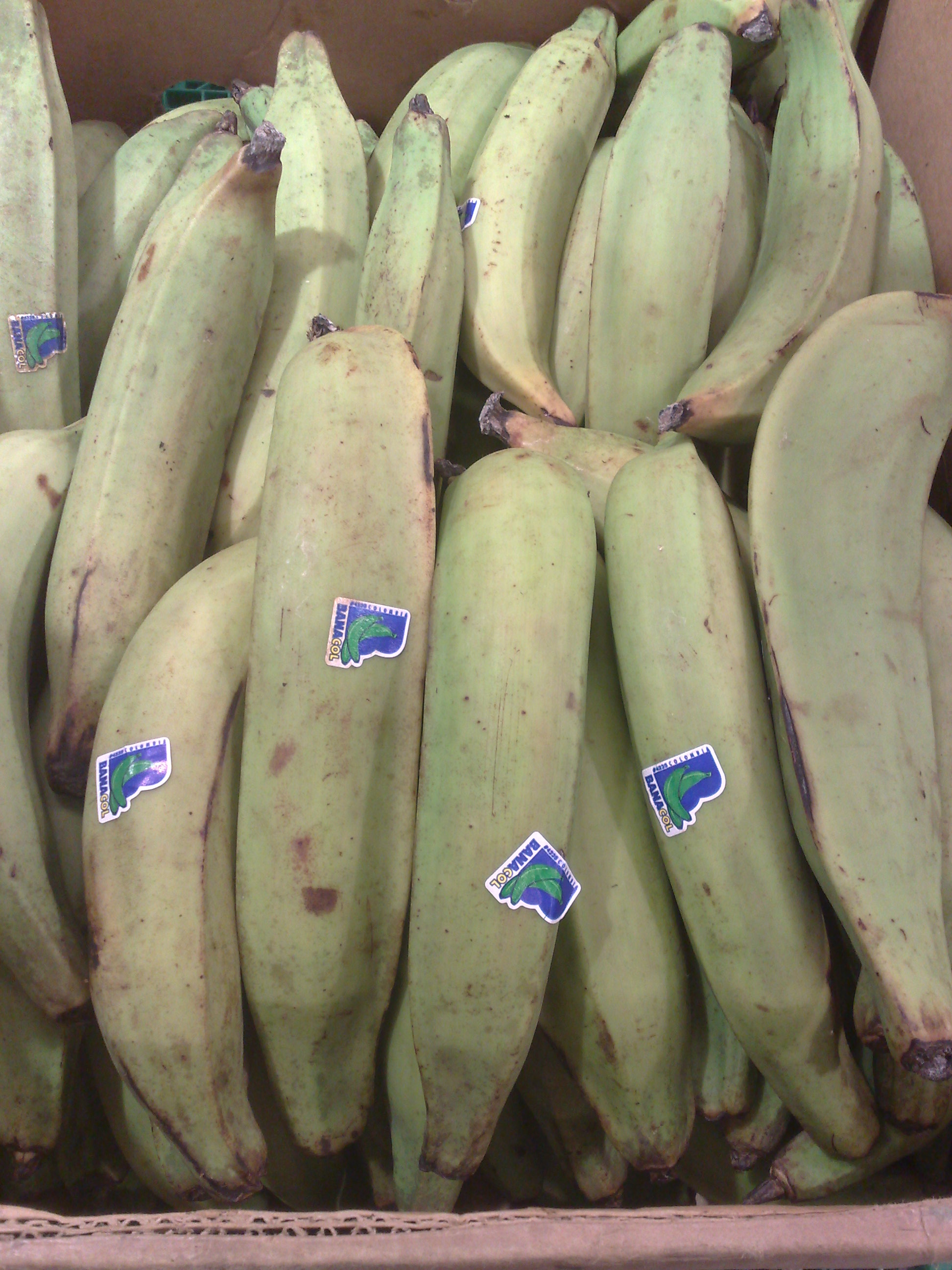
Plaintains

Breakfast dishes include saltfish, eggplant (also known as troba), eggs, and lettuce. Lunches typically include a starch, such as rice, macaroni or pasta, with vegetables or salad, an entree (such as fish, chicken, pork, or beef) and a side dish such as macaroni pie, scalloped potatoes or plantains. On Sundays, many people in the country go to church and afterward prepare a variety of foods at home. Dinner on Sundays is often eaten earlier (around 2:00 pm) because people are often off work. Dinners may include pork, baked chicken, stewed lamb, or turkey, alongside rice (prepared in a variety of ways), macaroni pie, salads, and a local drink. Dessert may be ice cream and cake, apple pie (mango and pineapple pie in their season), or gelatin. Antiguan butter bread is also a main staple of Antiguan cuisine, a soft buttery loaf of bread that needs no butter added once baked. Many locals enjoy fresh-baked butter bread and cheese for breakfast and throughout the day. There are many homes in neighborhoods all over Antigua that have small bakeries built onto them, where locals can go and purchase these fresh-baked loaves. They are coupled with cheese, sardines, and/or a bright red sausage that locals sometimes call salami, as well as many other foods. Most meals also include what is called "provisions" usually a root or starch like potatoes, yams, sweet potatoes, or eddo. During Carnival, souse, a type of soup made very spicy with pigs' feet, knuckles, and tails with many onions, is a popular snack, sold by vendors on the side of the road. Black pudding, also known as blood sausage, is a well-seasoned sausage made with rice, meat, and blood that is also enjoyed by locals in Antigua. In the countryside, locals roast fresh picked corn for sale, usually in the husk, on makeshift grills. The Antiguan pineapple is a very small fruit, but often juicy and sweet. There are small pineapple crops throughout the island.

== Beverages ==
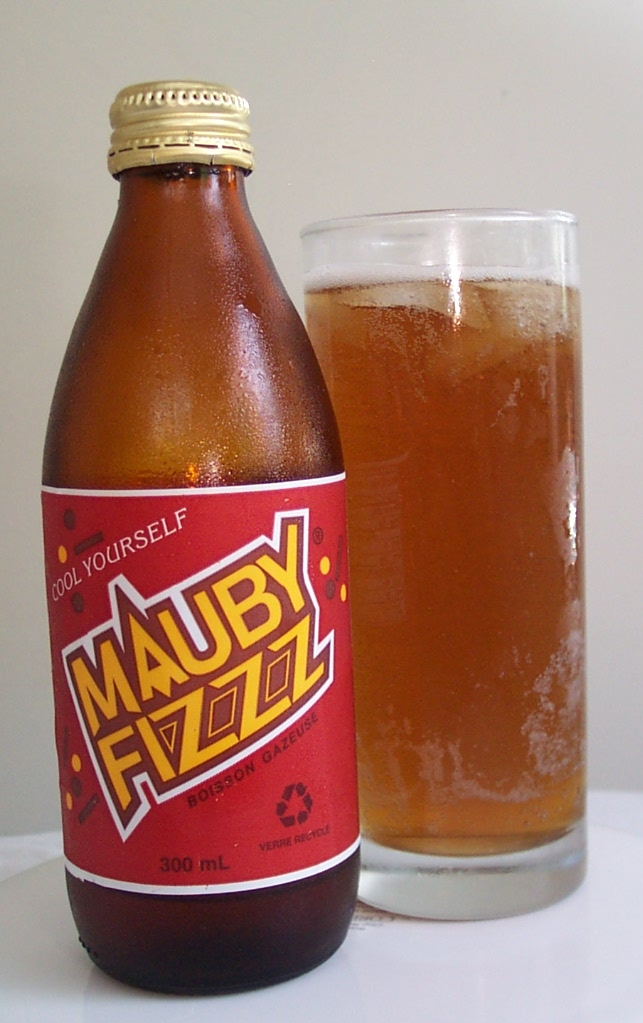
Bottle of mauby

Local drinks include mauby, seamoss, tamarind juice, raspberry juice, mango juice, lemonade, coconut milk, hibiscus juice, ginger beer, passion fruit juice, guava juice, soursop juice and ginger beer, a soft drink. Alcoholic drinks include beer, malts and rums, many of which are made locally, including Wadadli beer (named after the original name of the island) and the award-winning English Harbour Rum. Many locals drink bottled sodas that they call soft drink. One popular flavor is punch. The locals also enjoy Red Stripe beer, Malta, Guinness stout and Heineken beer. For the Christmas holidays a special celebratory alcoholic drink that is very popular in Antigua is called Ponche Kuba Cream Liqueur, a thick, creamy tan colored drink that is also very sweet and high in alcohol content.
