= Mofongo =

Puerto Rican plantain dish

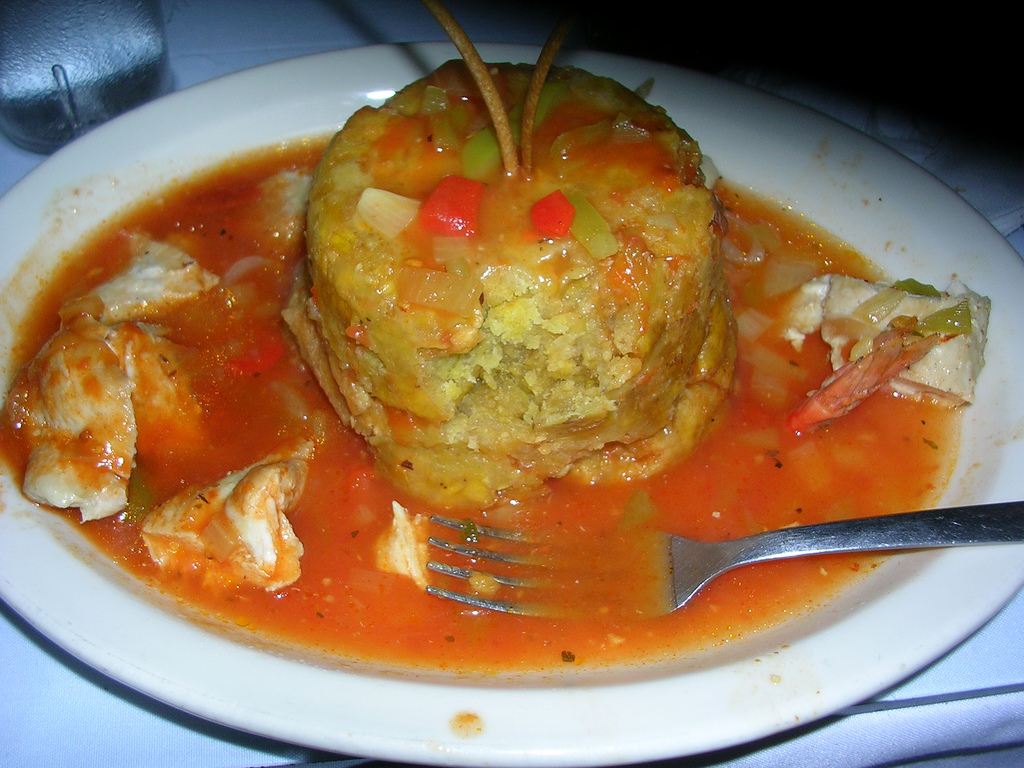
- Alternative names: Mofongo pelao, mofongo criollo, mofonguito
- Course: Main course
- Place of origin: Dominican Republic, Puerto Rico
- Serving temperature: Hot
- Main ingredients: Plantains, chicharrón, cooking oil (olive oil, lard, or butter), and garlic
- Variations: Fufu, tacacho, cayeye, mangú
- Other information: Popular throughout: Puerto Rico; Dominican Republic; New Jersey; Florida; New York City; Boston; Colombia

== Dominican rural antecedents ==
In the traditional cuisine of the Dominican Republic, rural preparations made from green plantains mashed in a wooden mortar (pilón) with garlic and pork cracklings (chicharrón) have long been part of everyday domestic and agricultural cooking, representing a parallel folk tradition prior to the widespread commercial adoption of the term mofongo in the country.

=== Historical context and rural origins ===
This preparation developed from the convergence of three foundational elements in the food history of Hispaniola since the colonial era:

- Introduction of the plantain (Musa paradisiaca): Introduced to Santo Domingo in 1516 by friar Tomás de Berlanga, plantains quickly became a staple crop for rural households and smallholder farms (conucos).
- African mortar traditions: Enslaved West and Central African populations brought the practice of mashing starchy foods and plantains in wooden mortars (pilones), related to traditions such as fufu.
- Rural livestock and pork culture: During the 17th and 18th centuries, rural economies tied to monteros and hateros in Santo Domingo relied heavily on wild and domestic pigs, with rendered lard and pork cracklings serving as primary sources of fat and seasoning in wood-fired kitchens.

=== Traditional names in rural Dominican cuisine ===
Before the term mofongo (documented in 19th-century Puerto Rican culinary texts) became common in urban Dominican restaurant menus during the 20th century, combinations of mashed green plantain, garlic, and pork cracklings were known in rural areas under descriptive local names:

- Mashed plantain with cracklings (plátano majado con chicharrón): A countryside preparation in which boiled or fried green plantains were mashed in a pilón with crushed garlic, salt, lard, and chopped cracklings incorporated directly into the mash.
- Machuquillo or regional field preparations: Documented in Dominican folklore studies in regions such as the Cibao and the South, consisting of compact mashed green plantain (roasted over embers, boiled, or fried) mixed with garlic, oregano, ají gustoso, and cracklings, sometimes wrapped in plantain leaves for agricultural workers to carry into the fields.
- Pork crackling mash in the central Cibao: In areas with strong pork-processing traditions such as Moca (Espaillat) and La Vega, cooks commonly mashed fried green plantains and garlic together with the crisp remnants and fat left in the rendering pot.

From a culinary history perspective, Dominican plátano majado con chicharrón and Puerto Rican mofongo reflect shared Caribbean foodways shaped by the same ingredients (green plantains, garlic, and pork), African pilón techniques, and cross-island contact. While mofongo was named, standardized, and published in 19th-century Puerto Rican cookbooks, similar mashed plantain-and-crackling preparations circulated in rural Dominican kitchens under local names before becoming integrated into broader modern restaurant fare. Mofongo (Spanish pronunciation: [moˈfoŋɡo]) is a dish from Puerto Rico with plantains as its main ingredient. Plantains are picked green, cut into pieces and typically fried in more modern versions but can be boiled in broth or roasted, then mashed with salt, garlic, pork, broth, and cooking oil (olive oil, butter, and lard is typically used) in a wooden pilón (mortar and pestle). Cassava and sweet potato are boiled, then roasted or flash-fried; plantains can also be made in this method or roasted before flash-frying. The goal is to produce a tight ball of mashed plantains that will absorb the attending condiments and have either pork cracklings (chicharrón) or bits of bacon inside. It is traditionally served with fried meat and chicken broth soup. Particular flavors result from variations that include vegetables, chicken, shrimp, beef, or octopus packed inside or around the plantain orb.

== Origin and history ==
Mofongo is a traditional Puerto Rican dish combining influences from the cultures of the Greater Antilles island, descending from Spain, West Africa, and Taíno, where Puerto Rico gets most of its culture and roots. These cultural influences also resulted in the creation of mofongo's distantly related but notably different West African dish fufu, but mofongo's unique flavor comes from a combination of West African flavors and the Taíno Indian culinary tradition of mashing root vegetables, mixed with Spanish culinary influences. Fufu, a sticky dough pulled and eaten by hand, is made from various starchy vegetables. Fufu was brought to the Caribbean by Africans in the Spanish New World colonies. Each country developed their own unique dish borne from their cultural origins and influences that were very different from the original native dish such as Trinidad and Tobago (pong plantain also known as tum-tum), Cuba (fufu de plátano and machuquillo), Dominican Republic (mangú), Haiti (tomtom) and Puerto Rico (mofongo and funche criollo); this also most likely includes Colombia (cayeye), Ecuador (bolón), Costa Rica (angú), Amazon region, and Peru (tacacho).

The earliest known written recipes for mofongo appeared in Puerto Rico's first cookbook, El Cocinero Puerto-Riqueño o Formulario, in 1859. The title of the recipe is mofongo criollo. Green plantains are cleaned with lemon, boiled with veal and hen, then mashed with garlic, oregano, ají dulce, bacon or lard, and ham. It is then formed into a ball and eaten with the broth in which it was cooked.

The El Cocinero Puerto-Riqueño o Formulario has similar recipes. Funche criollo is made from green or yellow plantains boiled with taro or yams, mashed and eaten with sesame broth soup or a sauce made from garlic, lard, tomato sauce, onions, and ají dulce (sofrito). The similar funche criollo does not include pork, however, one of the key ingredients in traditional mofongo.

Another well-known recipe was written by Elizabeth B.K. Dooley in her Puerto Rican cookbook (1948). The recipe calls for yellow plantains fried in lard, mashed with garlic, olive oil, and chicharrón, and then formed into a ball.

A 1980 booklet from the U.S. government promoting tourism in Puerto Rico wrote of mofongo as being "jocularly described as a Puerto Rican matzoh ball" and described mofongo as being a "mashed, roasted plantain, combine with bacon, spices and goes well with chicken soup".

The recipe has many variants throughout Puerto Rico, but most have maintained the key ingredients of traditional mofongo, such as pork, cooking oil, spices, broth, and starch, as well as the use of a pilón for mashing. The contemporary interpretation of classic mofongo involves frying the starch in lard or oil, and that method makes the dish distinctively Puerto Rican, giving it a crusty, dense, and umami flavor.

== Etymology ==
Central African ethnic groups that populated Puerto Rico used the technique of a mallet to mash large amounts of starchy foods. The mash was then softened with liquids. The word "mofongo" stems from the Kikongo term mfwenge-mfwenge, which means "a great amount of anything at all".

== Culture ==
Mofongo evolved from three cultural influences: Spanish, Taíno, and African within the Puerto Rican populace. Mofongo is different from fufu but uses the same African method with vegetables available in the Caribbean. Plantains are most often used, but other starchy roots native to the island used by Taínos can also be used. Puerto Ricans have an obsession with fried food known collectively as cuchifrito in New York City. Spanish ingredients such as pork, garlic, broth, and olive oil are commonly used together in Puerto Rican cuisine and are found in staple dishes such as arroz con gandules, alcapurria, pasteles, habichuelas, recaíto, and arroz junto, among others. Broth is often made with chicken and sofrito. Sofrito is made with Spanish and Taíno fruits, vegetables, and herbs.

Pork is a major component for most traditional offerings and the preparations of Puerto Rican cuisine. The only other Caribbean island where pork is a major component is Cuba. The use of lard, pork scraps and inner parts has its influence from the harsh diet and treatment of African people in Puerto Rico. This led to dishes on the island such as mofongo, gandinga, and mondongo. Mofongo combines the African tradition of fufu with limited ingredients given to slaves: plantains, lard, and pork scraps.

== Method ==
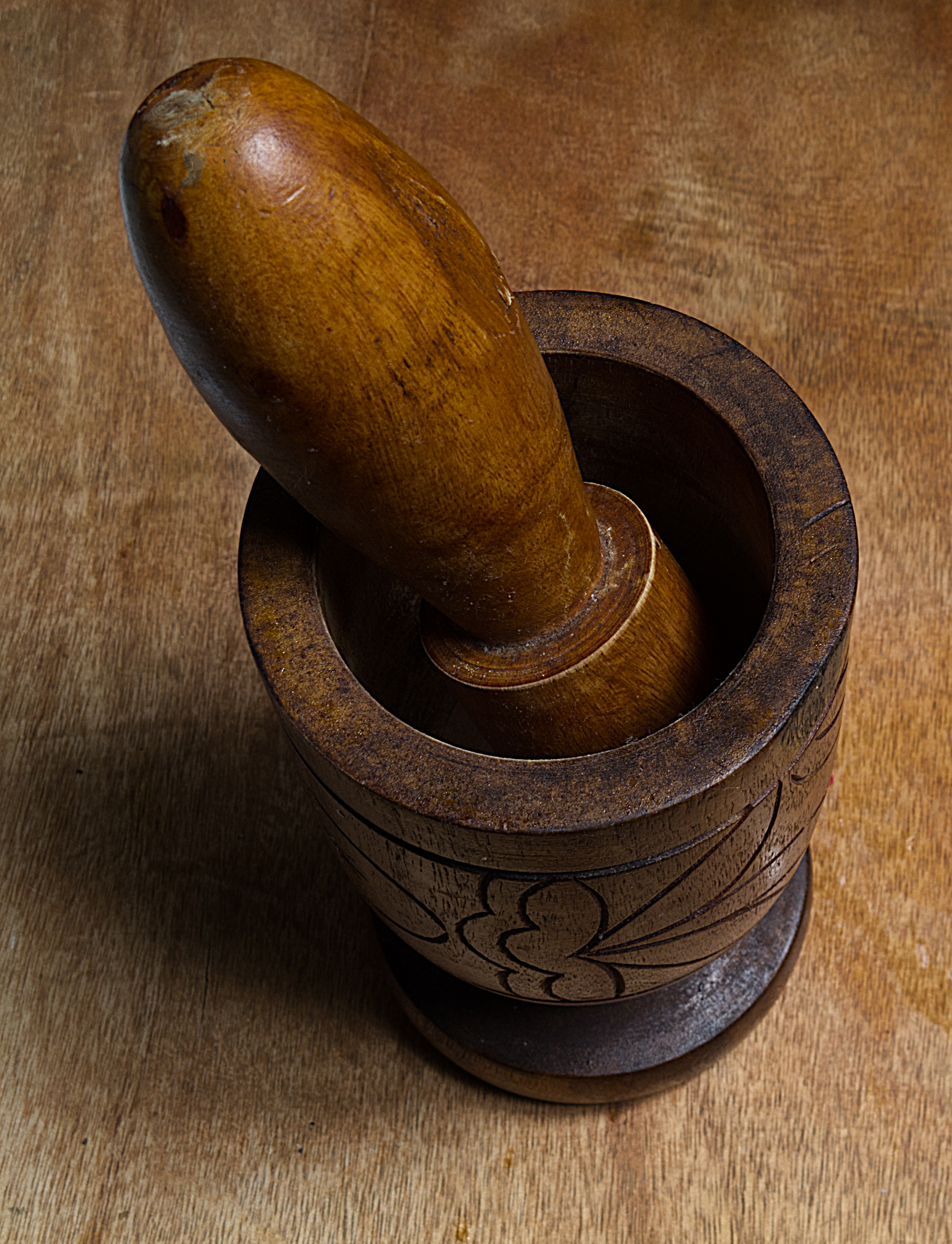
A pilón to make mofongo

The name mofongo refers to cooked plantains mashed with fat (olive oil, lard, or butter), spices, and pork in a wooden mortar and pestle called a pilón (made with mahogany or guaiacum, both native hardwoods) and shaped more or less into a ball and in or alongside broth. The mofongo is then able to absorb any juice or broth from the seared meat that is placed on top or inside of the dish. The consistency of mofongo is much more dense and stiff than fufu.

== Variations ==
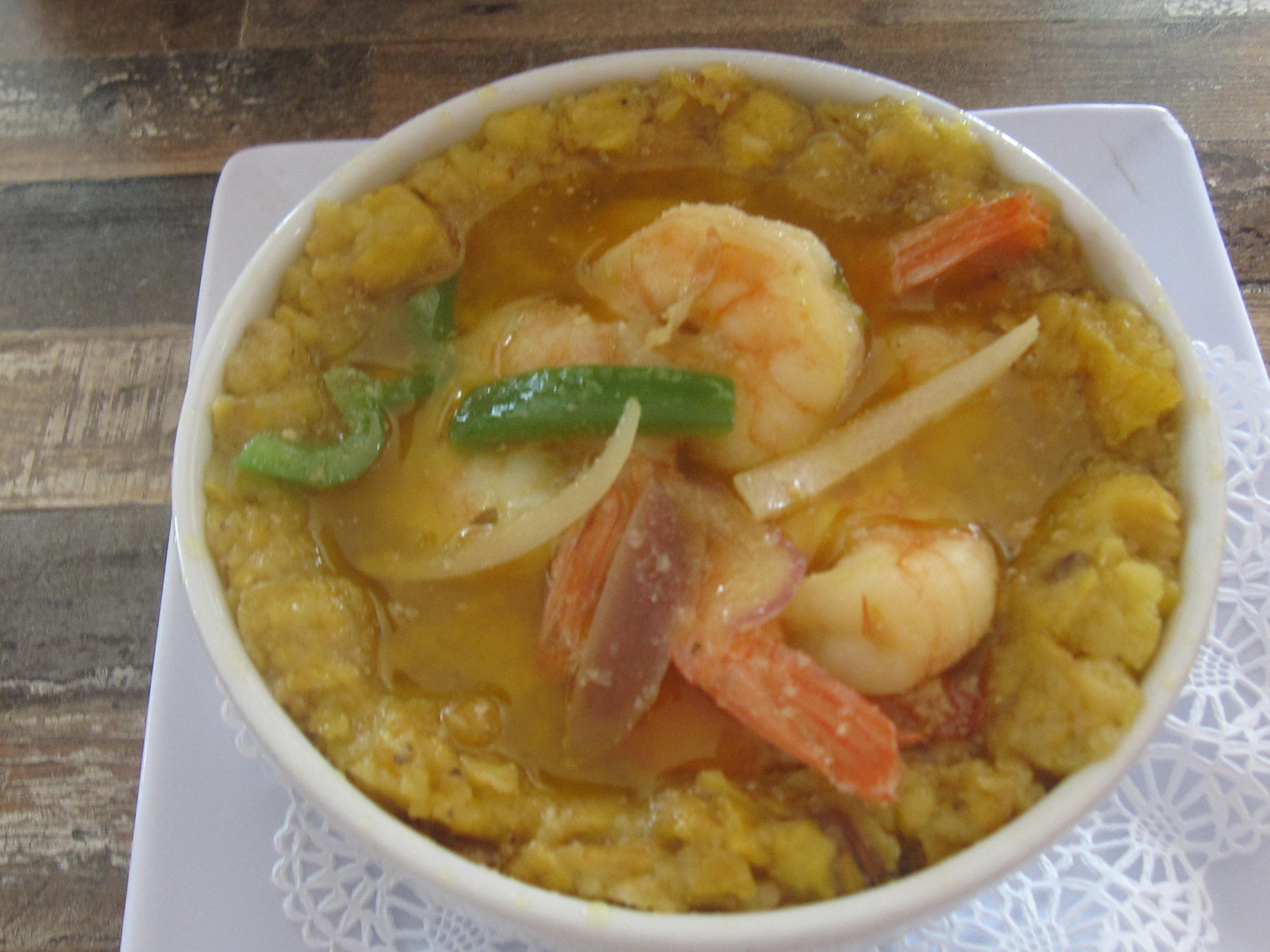
Shrimp mofongo from Rompeolas restaurant in Aguadilla, Puerto Rico

It is also common in Puerto Rico to make mofongo with cassava (mofongo de yuca), breadfruit (mofongo de pana), and ripe plantain mofongo (mofongo de amarillo).

Thanksgiving is an American holiday that has been adopted by Puerto Rico and Puerto Ricans outside the commonwealth. Turkey is the main focus on every Thanksgiving table and is traditionally stuffed with bread. The bread stuffing can be mixed with mofongo or replaced entirely with mofongo. The dish is called pavochon.

Frito-Lay produces MoFongo Snax, combining plantain chips, cassava chips and pork rinds into one bag.

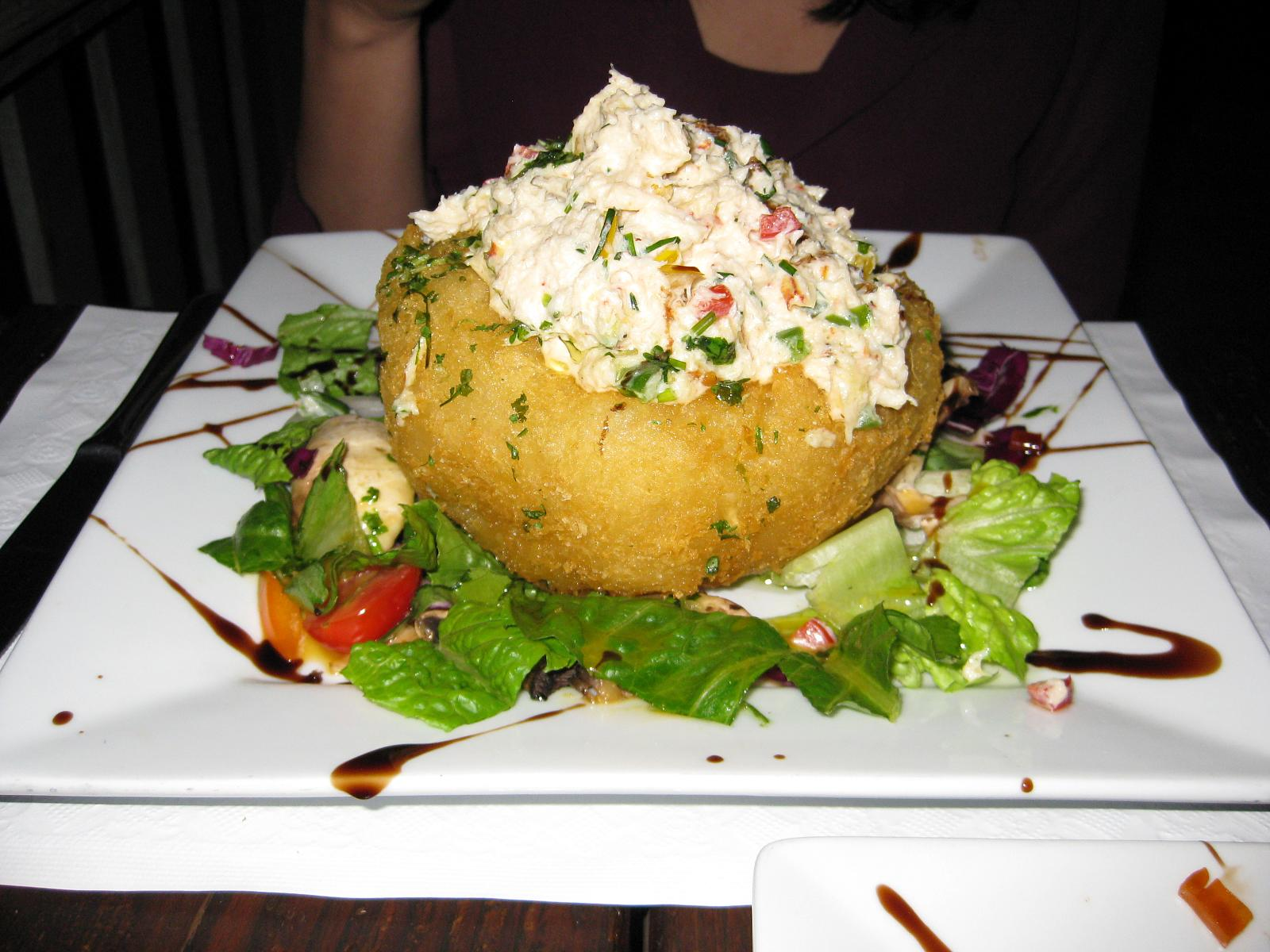
Mofongo relleno with crab meat in Culebra, Puerto Rico

Mofongo relleno is a stuffed variation of mofongo, which, according to Yvonne Ortiz, was first made in "Tino's Restaurant on the west coast of Puerto Rico" when seafood, abundant in the region, was placed inside the plantain ball with braised meat or more seafood poured over it. Today, mofongo relleno is commonly stuffed with either seafood, poultry, or another meat.

Mofonguito are bite-size mofongo usually served as an appetizer. Not to be confused with Dominican mofonguito, which are tostones relleno.

Moca, Dominican Republic, is known for making a mofongo with cheddar cheese shredded on top. It has been called mofongo Dominicano and mofongo el Mocano.

== Outside Puerto Rico ==
Dominicans who feared the dictatorship of Rafael Trujillo fled to Puerto Rico and New York City. Fried mofongo caught on quickly with Dominicans living in Puerto Rico and New York City. After Trujillo's death many Dominicans returned to the Dominican Republic, bringing the recipe for mofongo, which has remained popular ever since. The first Dominican cookbook with a recipe for mofongo is Cocina Criolla, second edition by Amanda Ornes, in 1962. The recipe is called mafongo using roasted green plantains mashed with just chicarrón and oil. Ramona Hernández, director of the Dominican Studies Institute of the City University of New York, has said, "mofongo is a dish borrowed from Puerto Rico that has much success with Dominicans". Dominican chef Clara Gonzalez, also known as Aunt Clara, says in her cookbook, "mofongo has a special place in the Dominicans' hearts and stomachs but can be traced back to Puerto Rico". Some food scholars claim roasted mofongo was brought over to the Dominican Republic during Dominican Republics sugar industry from 1916 to 1924 were Puerto Ricans migrated to work.

Mofongo has become popular among Colombians, Cubans and Dominicans living in the United States and anywhere large numbers of Puerto Ricans or Dominicans reside.

== In popular culture ==
Food Network chef and host Guy Fieri featured mofongo from Benny's Seafood (in Miami, Florida) and from El Bohio (in San Antonio, Texas) on two separate episodes of his show Diners, Drive-Ins and Dives. He liked the dish so much that he called it the "best fried thing I ever ate" on an episode of the show The Best Thing I Ever Ate.

An episode of the Travel Channel's Man v. Food Nation, set in Harlem, showed the host Adam Richman visiting a Spanish Harlem restaurant called La Fonda Boricua, where they make a giant 12-plantain mofongo called the Mofongaso.

Mofongo is so important in the Puerto Rican culture that it is sung and mentioned in numerous songs, including "Mofongo pelao" by Ismael Rivera, "mofongo" by Simon Montserrat & Djeli, "pun pun catalú" by Celia Cruz, "mofongo" by Lamborginny, "y no hago mas na" and "el menu" by El Gran Combo de Puerto Rico, and "mangú y mofongo" by Unción Tropical and Isabel Valdez, a song about a Dominican bringing mangú and a Puerto Rican bringing mofongo. Perhaps the oldest song mentioning mofongo is called "Puertorriqueño" by Joe Valle and César Concepción.

On Saturday Night Live, David Ortiz (a recurring character played by Kenan Thompson) frequently refers to the dish when describing his "big lunch".

Mofongo was mentioned numerous times on the 1970s U.S. NBC situation comedy Sanford & Son when characters Fred and Lamont (Redd Foxx and Demond Wilson) interact with their Puerto Rican neighbor Julio (Gregory Sierra).

The 2021 animated PBS show Alma's Way, about a Puerto Rican girl growing up in the Bronx with her family, frequently mentions mofongo as a favorite family dish.
