= Cuchifritos =

Various fried foods prepared principally of pork

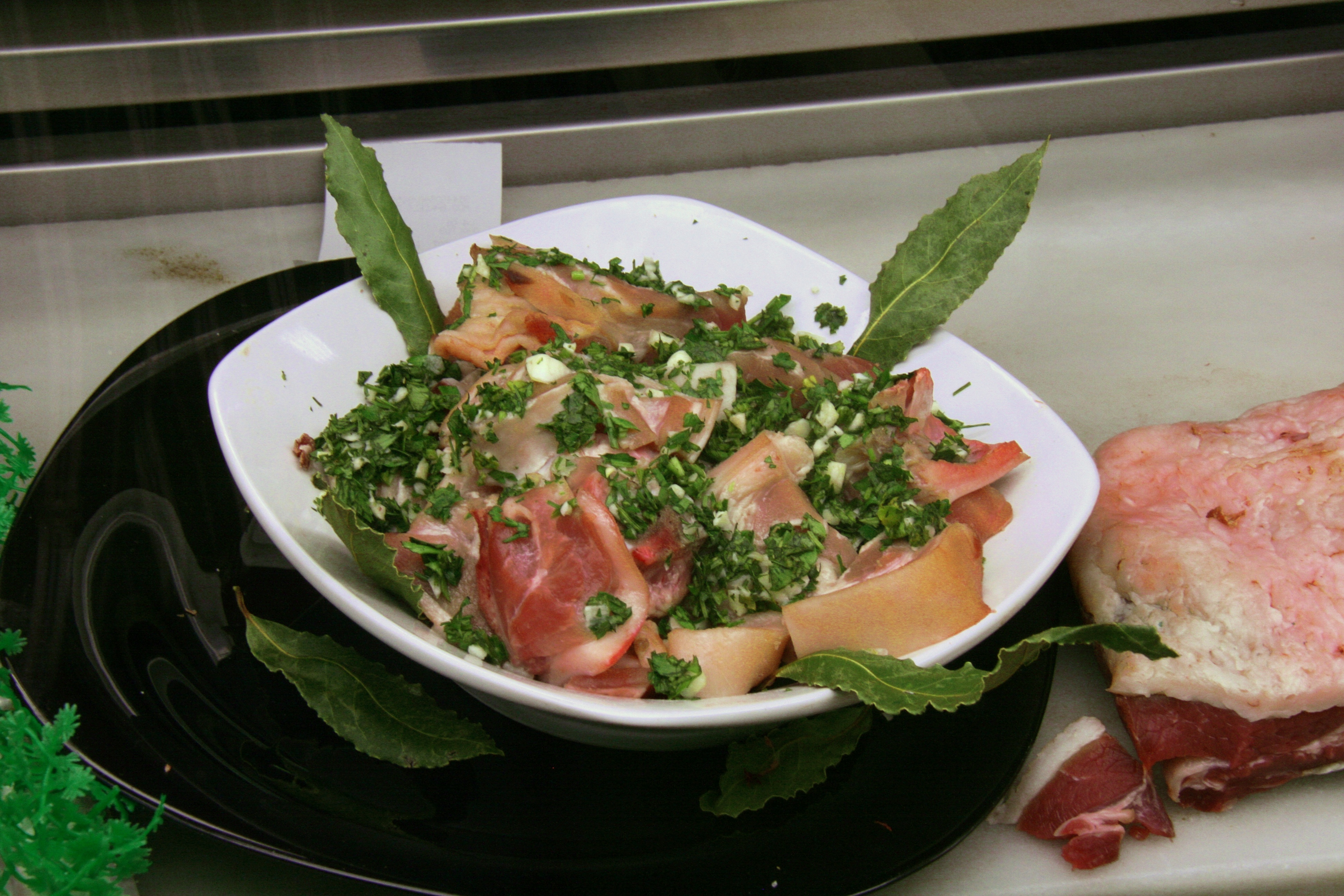
Raw cuchifritos before being cooked, with all of the ingredients

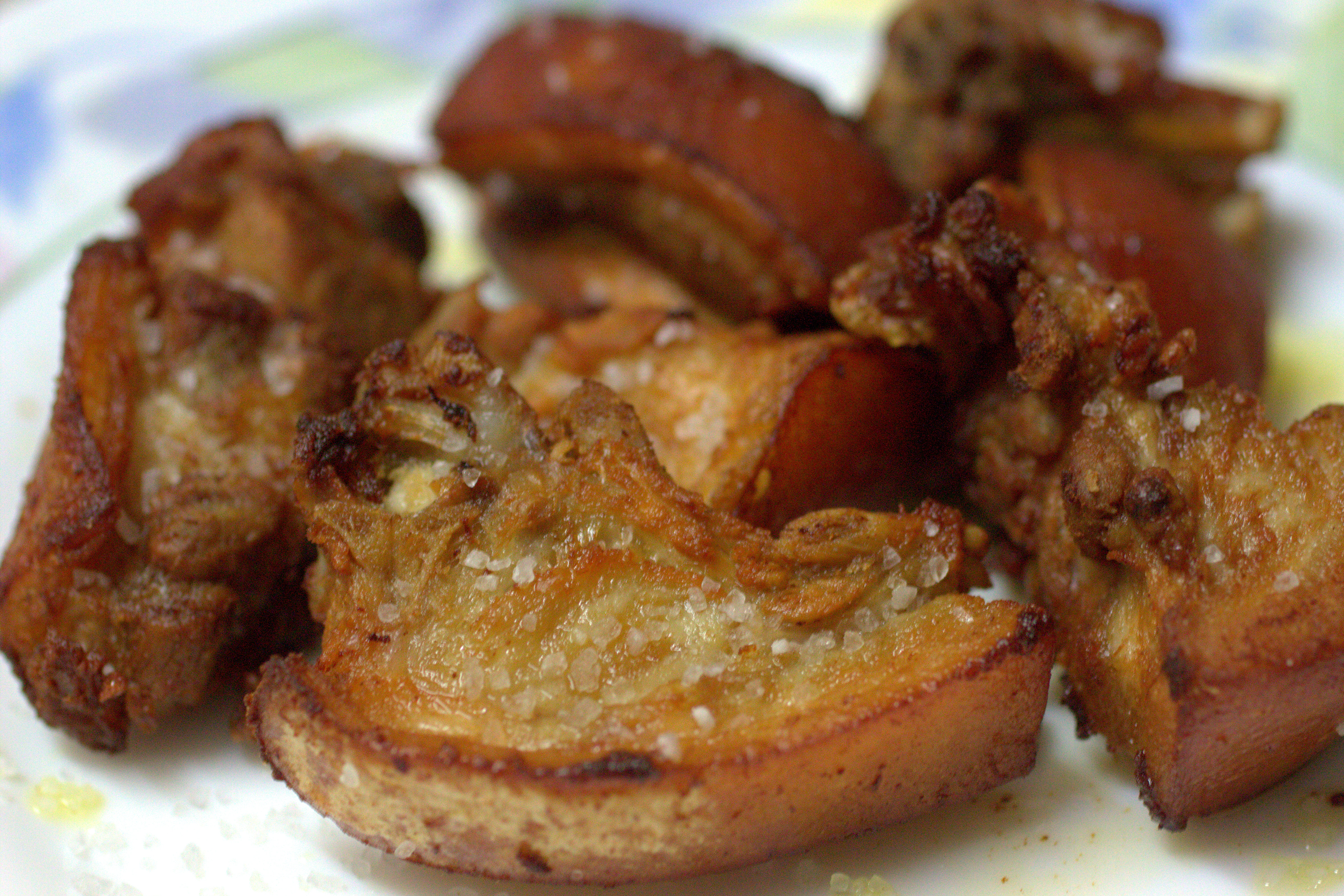
Fried cochifritos made of cochinillo (suckling pig) ready for consumption

Cuchifritos (Spanish pronunciation: [kutʃiˈfɾitos]) or cochifritos refers to various fried foods prepared principally of pork in Spanish and Puerto Rican cuisine. In Spain, cuchifritos are a typical dish from Segovia in Castile. The dish consists of pork meat fried in olive oil and garlic and served hot. In Puerto Rico they include a variety of dishes including morcilla (blood sausage), rellenos de papa (fried potato balls stuffed with meat), and chicharron (fried pork skin), and other parts of the pig prepared in different ways. Some cuchifritos dishes are prepared using cooking plantain as a primary ingredient. Cuchifritos vendors also typically serve juices and drinks such as passionfruit, pineapple, and coconut juice, as well as ajonjolí, a drink made from sesame seeds.

== Origin ==
The term used to refer to small, fried parts of a pig.

It is incorrectly thought that it derives its name from the word cuchí, short for cochino or pig and frito, which describes something that is fried.

The etymology of the word comes from the participle of verbs cocer -to cook or boil- (latín coctum > cocho, from which derives the element cochi-) y freír -to fry-(-frito).

Cuchifritos may also refer to restaurants that serve this type of food.

== In New York ==
In New York, vendors advertising cuchifritos are particularly notable because they tend to make use of colorful lighting and flashy signs that catch the eyes of passersby. These establishments dot Puerto Rican and Dominican areas of New York City, particularly Spanish Harlem, Bushwick, Hamilton Heights, Washington Heights, South Bronx, Brooklyn, and other primarily Puerto Rican and Dominican neighborhoods.

== Puerto Rican dishes ==
Cuchifrito vendors also sell rice with stewed beans, arroz junto, and arroz con gandules. Originally these dishes would have been fried in lard. Today they use frying oil because it is cheaper and very available. Some Dominican dishes have been adopted, notably morir soñando and mangú. Jamaican patty and Cuban masitas de puerco (fried pork shoulder) are popular in cuchifritos as well.

Fried dishes served in a cuchifrito in Puerto Rico are called frituras:

- Aítos – Bacalaítos with crab or shrimp added.
- Alcapurria – Starchy dough from yautía, squash, potatoe and green banana, plantain, breadfruit or cassave, seasond with lard, annatto and adobo seco. Stuffed with meat, shaped more or less as a cone on both ends and deep-fried. Cassava alcapurrias are usually filled with crab, shrimp or lobster.
- Almojábana – A round fritter made of rice flour, milk, eggs, sugar, baking powder, baking soda, stuffed with cheese and fried.
- Arañitas – Arañitas translate to "spiders". These small fritters are called spiders, due to the wide shredding of plantains. The green plantains are shredded and seasoned with garlic, salt, peppers, formed into flat small fritters and fried. Many other recipes exist, such as adding sweet plantains, eggs, onion, fresh herbs, cheese and shredded meat. They are served with fry sauce.
- Arepa de coco – Sweet bread made from flour, yeast, egg, sugar, coconut milk. They are fried, cut open and stuffed with seafood, meat, vegetables or cheese.
- Bacalaíto – Deep-fried pancake-like batter containing salted codfish, flour, milk, sofrito and spices.
- Canoas de plátano – Sweet plantains are cut down the middle, fried or baked, stuffed with savory ground meat and topped with shredded cheese.
- Chicharrón – Pork cracklings.
- Chicharrón de pollo – Fried bite-sized chicken chunks marinated and coated in a seasoned egg batter of flour and cornstarch.
- Empanadilla and pastelillo – Empanadas.
- Mofongo – The plantains are typically fried before mashing with broth, spices, garlic, olive oil, and chicarrón but the plantains can also be boiled, roasted or baked. It is served in numerous ways.
- Morcilla – Blood sausage.
- Oreja – Fried pig ears.
- Pastelillo or pastelillo de yuca – Empanada dough made with tapioca, annatto, lard, milk and egg yolks, filled with meat or cheese.
- Pionono – Slices of ripe plantain stuck together with toothpicks and filled with seasoned ground beef or seafood and cheese. They are dipped in a batter and fried.
- Plátanos maduro – Slices of sweet plantains deep-fried.
- Pollo frito – Breaded fried chicken thighs or legs.
- Platanos rebozados – Sweet plantain slices coated in a sweet spiced egg batter and fried.
- Relleno de maduros – Sweet plantain version of relleno de papa.
- Rellenos de papa – Cooked potatoes mashed with eggs, milk, annatto, flour or cornstarch, stuffed with picadillo, meat, seafood, vegetables, or cheese rolled in cornmeal or breadcrumbs, then deep-fried.
- Rellenos de panapén – Breadfruit version of rellenos de papa.
- Rellenos de apio - Celeriac version of rellenos de papa.
- Rellenos de yuca – Cassave version of rellenos de papa.
- Sorullos – Sweet cornmeal-based fritter similar to a hushpuppy, filled with cheese.
- Tostones – Double-fried green plantains served with meals or as a snack with mojo sauce, hot sauce or fry sauce "mayo ketchup".
- Tostones de panapén – Same as plantain tostone but with unripe breadfruit.

== In media ==
New World cuchifritos and cuchifrito establishments have appeared regularly in the Bronx Flavor television series hosted by Baron Ambrosia. Episodes such as "Cuchifritos of Love" document the history of the food and its distinct role in Nuyorican cuisine and identity.

== See also ==
- Cuisine of Puerto Rico
- Cuisine of New York City
- Finger food
