= Daisy Cocco De Filippis =

Daisy Cocco DeFilippis
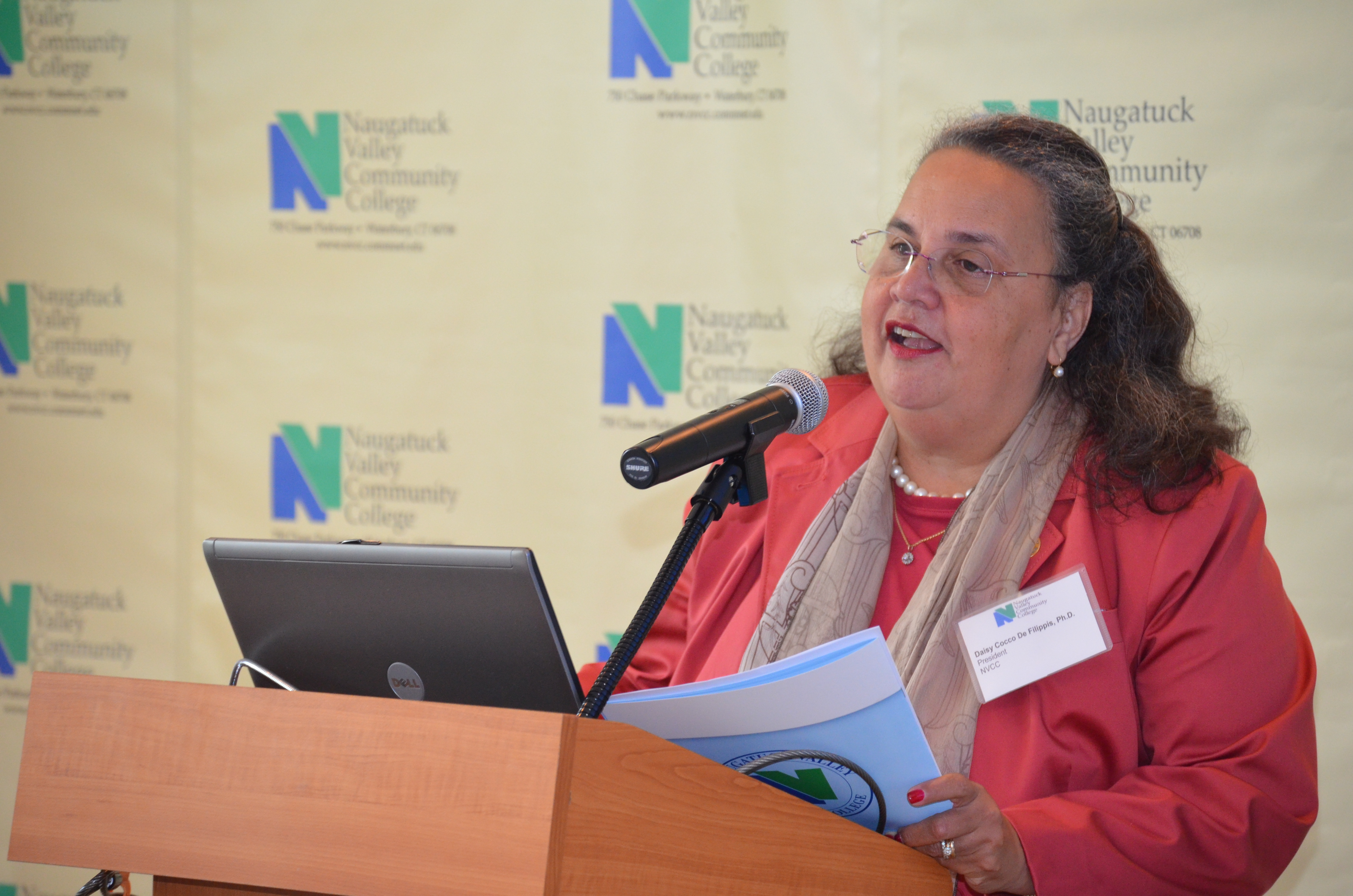
- Born: Daisy Cocco; 25 February 1949 (age 77); Dominican Republic
- Other name: Daisy C. Defilippis
- Education: Queens College; CUNY Graduate Center
- Occupation: Community college president
- Children: 3
- Relatives: Miguel Cocco

Daisy Cocco DeFilippis (born 25 February 1949) is a Dominican-American academic administrator and author. She is the current president at Hostos Community College in The Bronx, making her the first person born in the Dominican Republic to serve as President of a college of the City University of New York. From 2008 to 1 August 2020 she was president of Naugatuck Valley Community College (NVCC) in Waterbury, Connecticut. She is the author of works of fiction and non-fiction dealing with Dominican and Dominican-American women.

== Early life and education ==
Cocco was born in Santo Domingo on 25 February 1949. Her parents divorced when she was 4 and her mother remarried that same year. Cocco lived with her mother and her second husband in a home owned by an Italian couple. Her maternal grandmother, Gabriela Menendez Henriquez (Mama Beila), a schoolteacher, who encouraged her to read Dominican poetry and books, was a stabilizing and influential figure in her childhood. By the age of 9, she was fluent in Spanish and Italian.

Her mother moved to New York City, and Cocco joined her when she was 13 years old. She graduated from high school there, married Nunzio De Filippis, and at 19 had her first child, Joseph. Attending night school at Queens College, City University of New York, Cocco graduated summa cum laude with a Bachelor of Arts in Spanish and English literature in 1975. Continuing her education at Queens College, she completed her master's degree in 1978 in Spanish literature.

== Career ==
In 1978, Cocco became an adjunct lecturer for York College, City University of New York. She had two more sons, Nunzio Andrew and James Louis, and began working on her doctorate at CUNY Graduate Center, completing her Ph.D. in Spanish language in 1984. Sociologist and historian, Ramona Hernández, and historian, Anthony Stevens-Acevedo stated that Cocco was the "first person of Dominican ancestry to complete her Ph.D. in the City University of New York". Her career at York College advanced and she became a professor of Spanish, chair of the Department of Foreign Languages, and in 1994 was promoted to president of the Dominican Studies Association.

Cocco's research has focused on the literature of the Dominican Republic, but more broadly the Caribbean and Latin American region, including the Diaspora. Her particular interest has been interpreting and translating the works of Dominican women writers and disseminating their works to broader audiences. She is recognized internationally as a pioneering scholar, who has built a reputation for her studies of Dominican women and has received numerous awards and honors for her scholarship. She has written over 50 books and academic journal articles and published translations of over four dozen poems by Dominican writers.

After 20 years of teaching, Cocco moved into administrative roles, serving as associate dean of academic affairs at York College. From 2002 to 2008, she was the Chancellor and Senior Vice President for Academic Affairs of Hostos Community College in The Bronx. In 2008, she became the president of Naugatuck Valley Community College in Waterbury, Connecticut. Under her guidance student retention rose, enrollment increased, and a campus was opened in 2016 in Danbury, Connecticut. She also worked with local governance to bring evening bus service to Waterbury.

Citing a need to return to her family in New York because of the COVID-19 pandemic, Cocco retired effective 1 August 2020 from Naugatuck Valley Community College and became the interim president of the Hostos Community College. Her appointment marked the first time a Dominican woman has served as "president of a university in the CUNY university consortium".

== Honors and awards ==
- 2003 Order of Merit Cristóbal Colón, with the Rank of Commander, presented by Hipólito Mejía, President of the Dominican Republic.
- 2005 Hija Distinguida of Santo Domingo/Distinguished Daughter Award, presented by the Mayor of Santo Domingo.
- 2005 Order of Merit of Duarte, Sánchez and Mella with the Rank of Commander, presented by Dr. Leonel Fernandez, President of the Dominican Republic.
- 2016 Honorary Doctorate of Letters, Universidad Autónoma de Santo Domingo.

== Selected works ==
- Hija de Camila/Camila's Line Santo Domingo: Editora Nacional, Feria del Libro Dominicano, 2007
- Documents of Dissidence, Selected Writings by Dominican Women New York: Foundational Series, CUNY Dominican Studies Institute, 2000
- Tertuliando/Hanging Out, Dominicanas & Friends Santo Domingo: Publicación Permanente de la Feria del Libro Dominicano [Dominican Edition], 1997, and New York: CUNY Caribbean Exchange Program, Hunter College, CUNY, 1997
- Sin otro profeta que su canto, antología de poesía escrita por dominicanas Santo Domingo: Biblioteca Taller, 1988
- Stories from Washington Heights and Other Corners of the World Co-editor. New York: Latin American Writers Institute, 1994
- Telling To Live, Testimonios by Latina Researchers Co-author. Duke University Press, 2001
