= Stamp and Go =

Jamaican fritter

Stamp and Go (Saltfish Fritter)
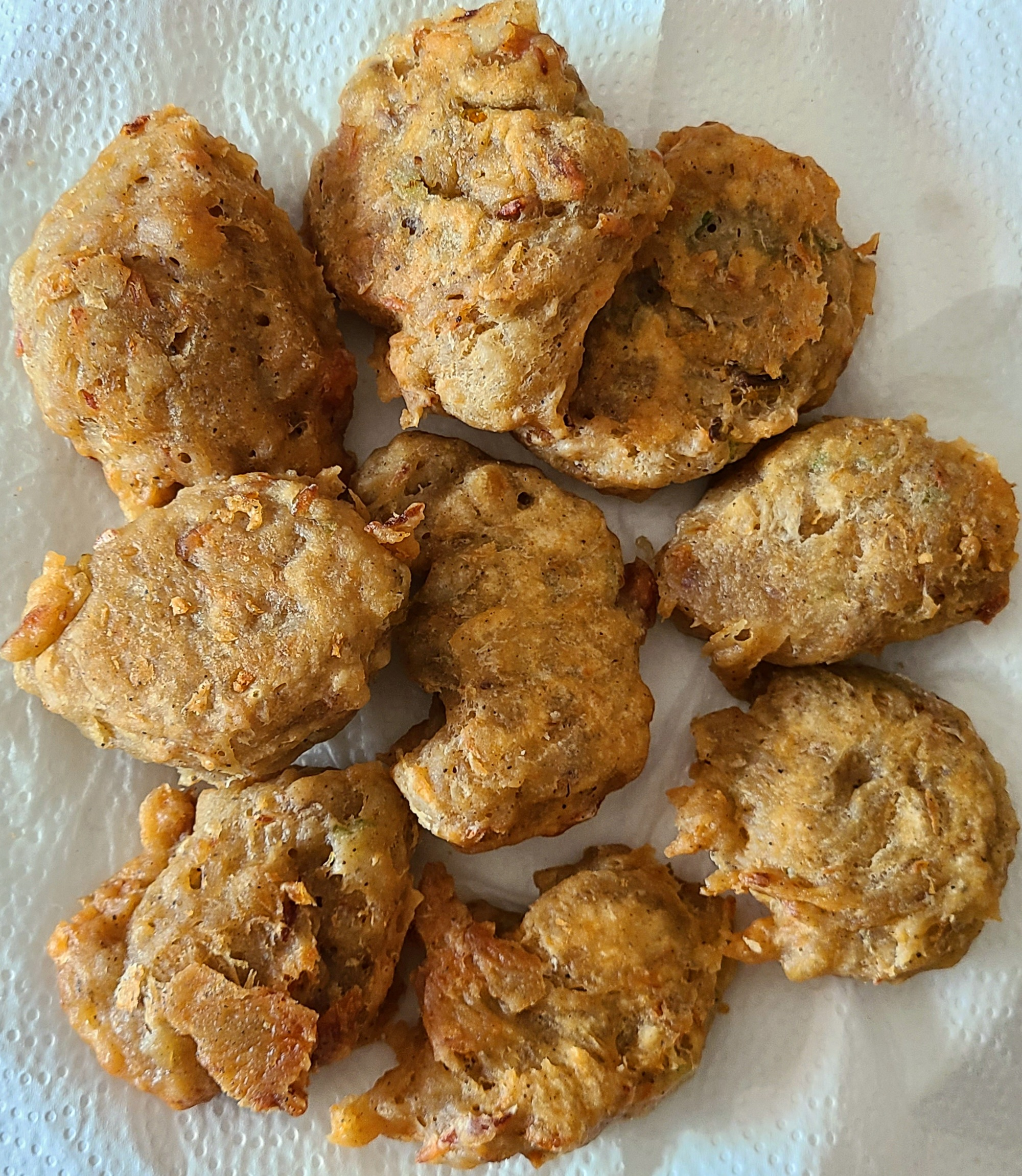
- Type: Fritter
- Course: Breakfast, starter or snack
- Place of origin: Jamaica
- Main ingredients: Flour, saltfish, onion, pepper and escallion
- Variations: Bacalaíto (Puerto Rico); Torrejas/Arepitas de bacalao (Dominican Republic); Frituras de bacalao (Cuba)

Stamp and Go or saltfish fritter is a traditional fish fritter made with saltfish in Jamaican cuisine. It is typically eaten as a Jamaican breakfast, appetizer, snack or side dish. It is considered one of the island's original fast foods.

== History ==
=== Origin ===
Stamp and Go (saltfish fritter) is a Creole dish with Spanish and Portuguese roots, which originated in Jamaica. Saltfish (bacalao in Spanish or bacalhau in Portuguese), which has been a staple in Spanish and Portuguese cuisines for centuries, was introduced to the island as an affordable source of protein and a Lenten and Easter dish during the colonial era. Stamp and Go is a variation of buñuelos de bacalao from Spain and bolinhos/pastéis de bacalhau from Portugal. Other similar dishes can be found throughout the Greater Antilles and Latin America.

=== Etymology ===
The unusual name is believed to have derived from the 18th-century British sailing ships, whereby if an officer wanted something to be done in a hurry the order was "Stamp and Go!".

== Description ==
Stamp and Go is a savory dish, but can be made spicy. The exterior of the fritter should be crispy with a soft and chewy interior. There are various ways to prepare the dish, but generally it is made with salted codfish, all-purpose or counter flour, water, scallion, Scotch bonnet pepper, black pepper, salt and onion. Sometimes, tomato, thyme, bell pepper, garlic, baking powder and all-purpose seasoning are added. The saltfish is soaked or boiled to remove excess salt, then deboned and flaked, before it is combined with the other ingredients to create a thick, viscous batter. The batter is spooned into a skillet with hot oil, and deep-fried until golden-brown. Bite-sized fritters are often served with tangy dips at cocktail parties or formal events, while larger ones are popular for breakfast and were often used as provisions for travellers.

== Variations and similar dishes ==
Variations of the dish are made across Jamaica, whereby ackee is paired with saltfish to create ackee and saltfish fritters. Sometimes, saltfish is substituted with shrimp or sausage, and ital (vegan) versions are made with ackee or corn. Sweeter versions include banana fritter and plantain fritter made with ripe banana and plantain, sugar and spices like cinnamon and nutmeg.

In Puerto Rico, there is a similar dish called bacalaíto, and in the Dominican Republic it is called torrejas or arepitas de bacalao, and frituras de bacalao in Cuba. In French Caribbean countries like Haiti, St Martin, Guadeloupe and Martinique there is a similar dish called accra de morue (saltfish accra).

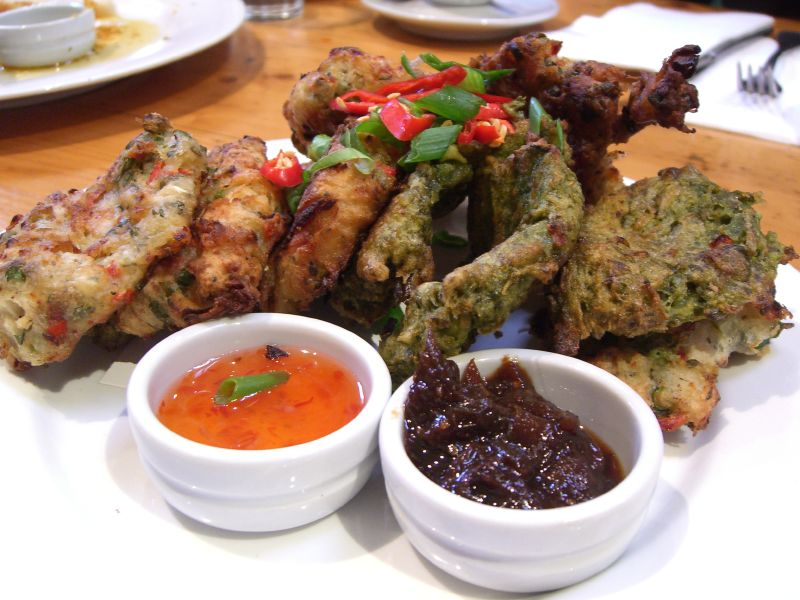
Saltfish and callaloo fritters

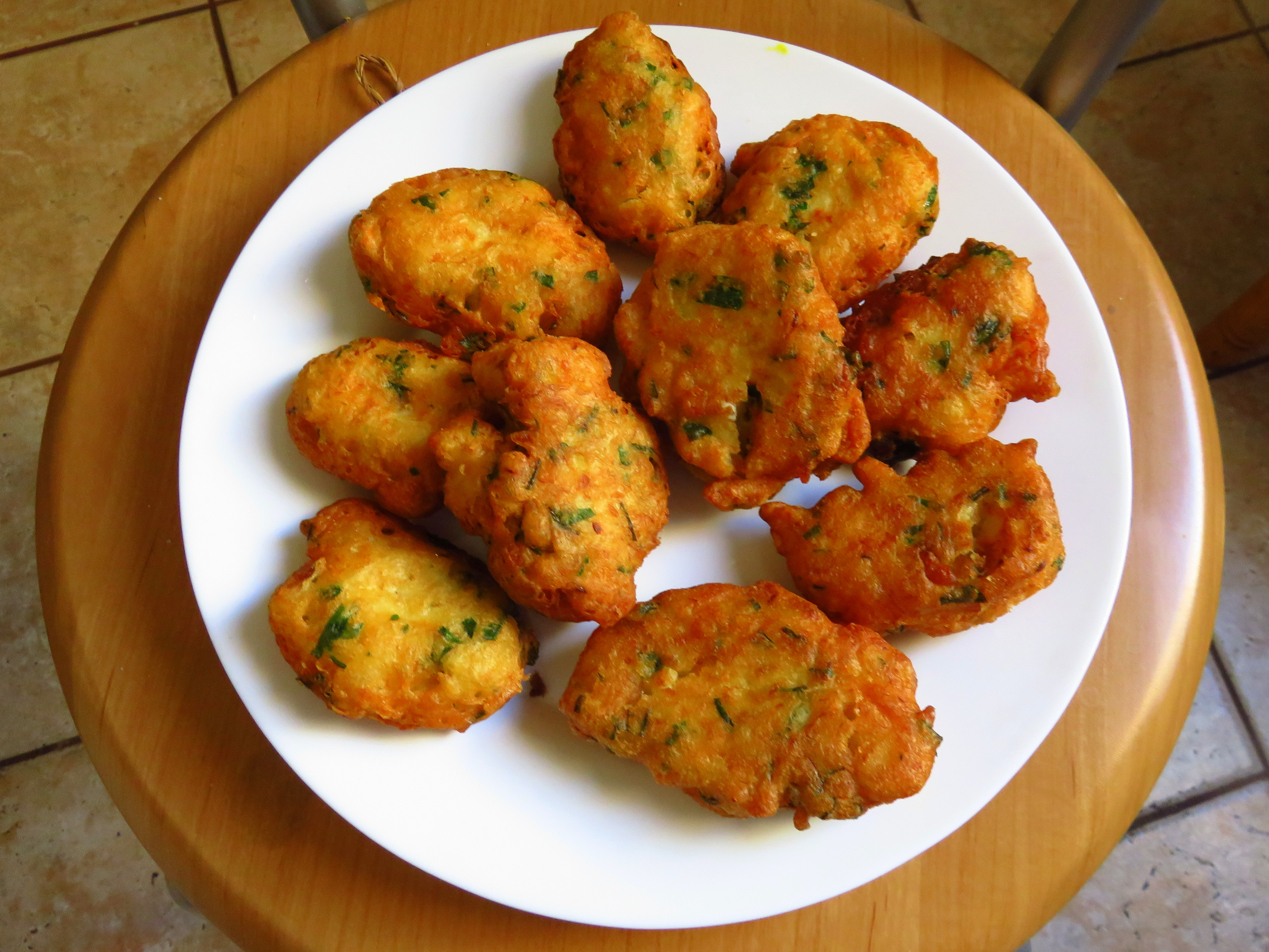
Buñuelos de bacalao

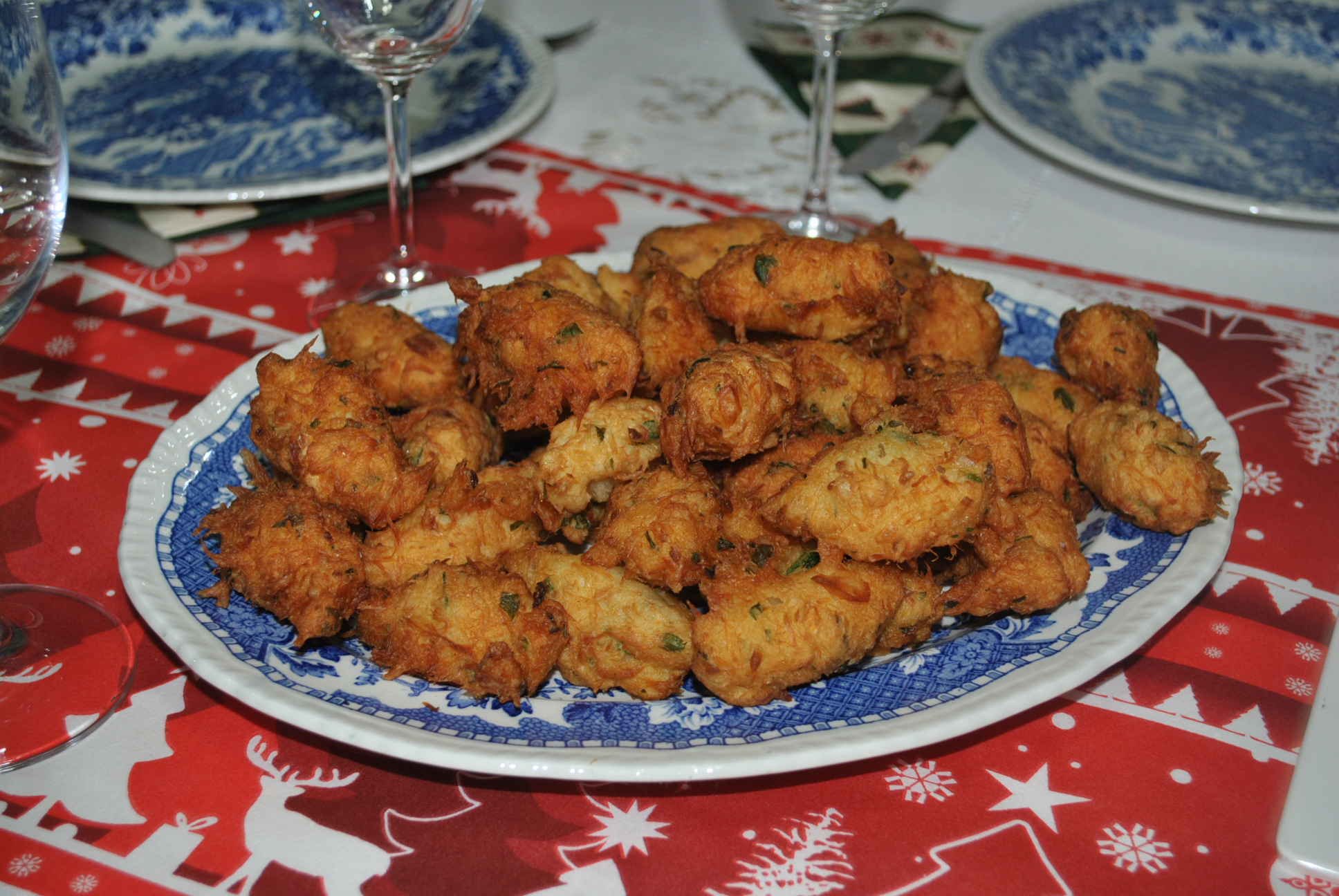
Bolinhos de bacalhau

== See also ==
- Fish fry
- Jamaican cuisine
- List of Jamaican dishes
