= Alcapurria =

Fritter from Puerto Rico

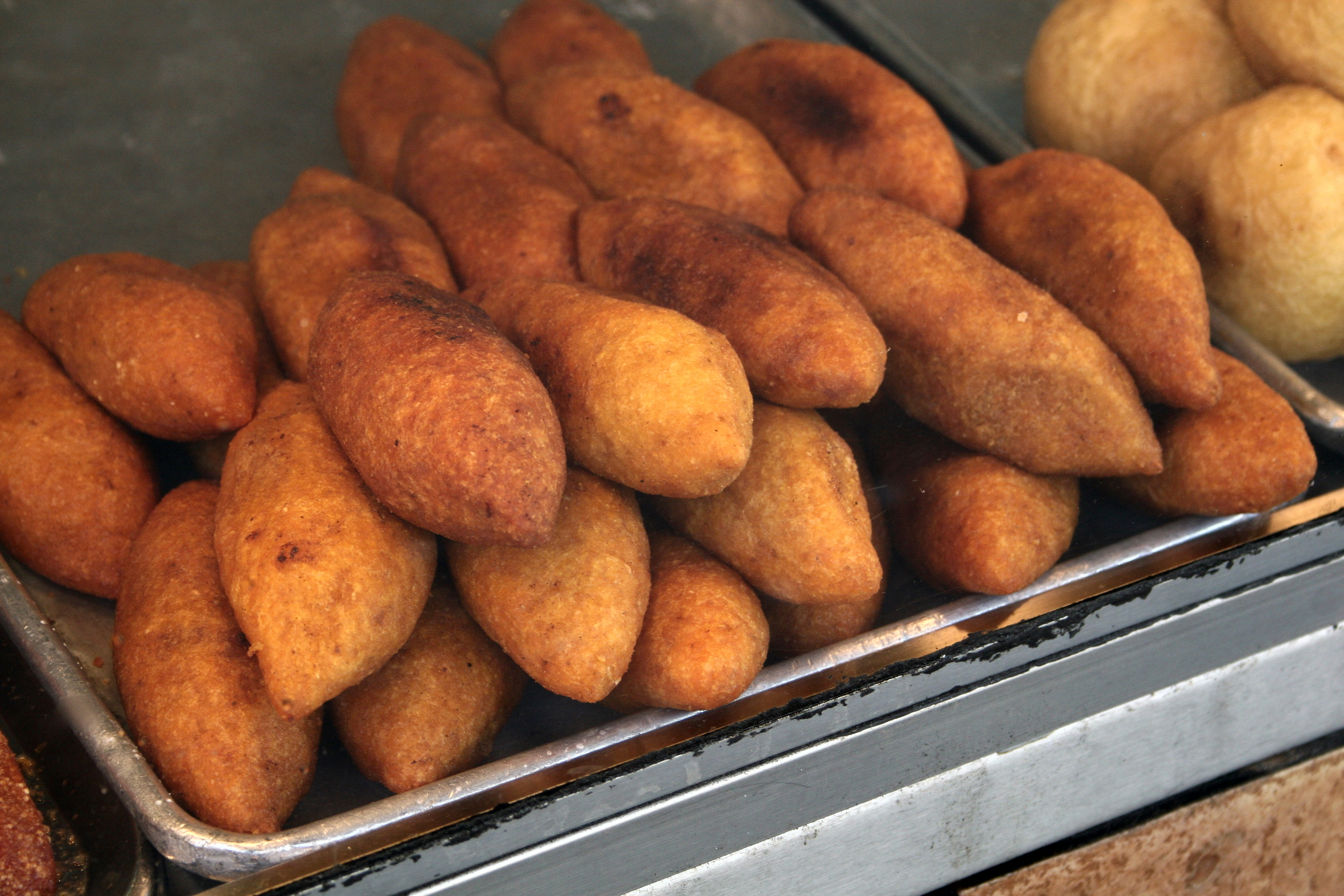
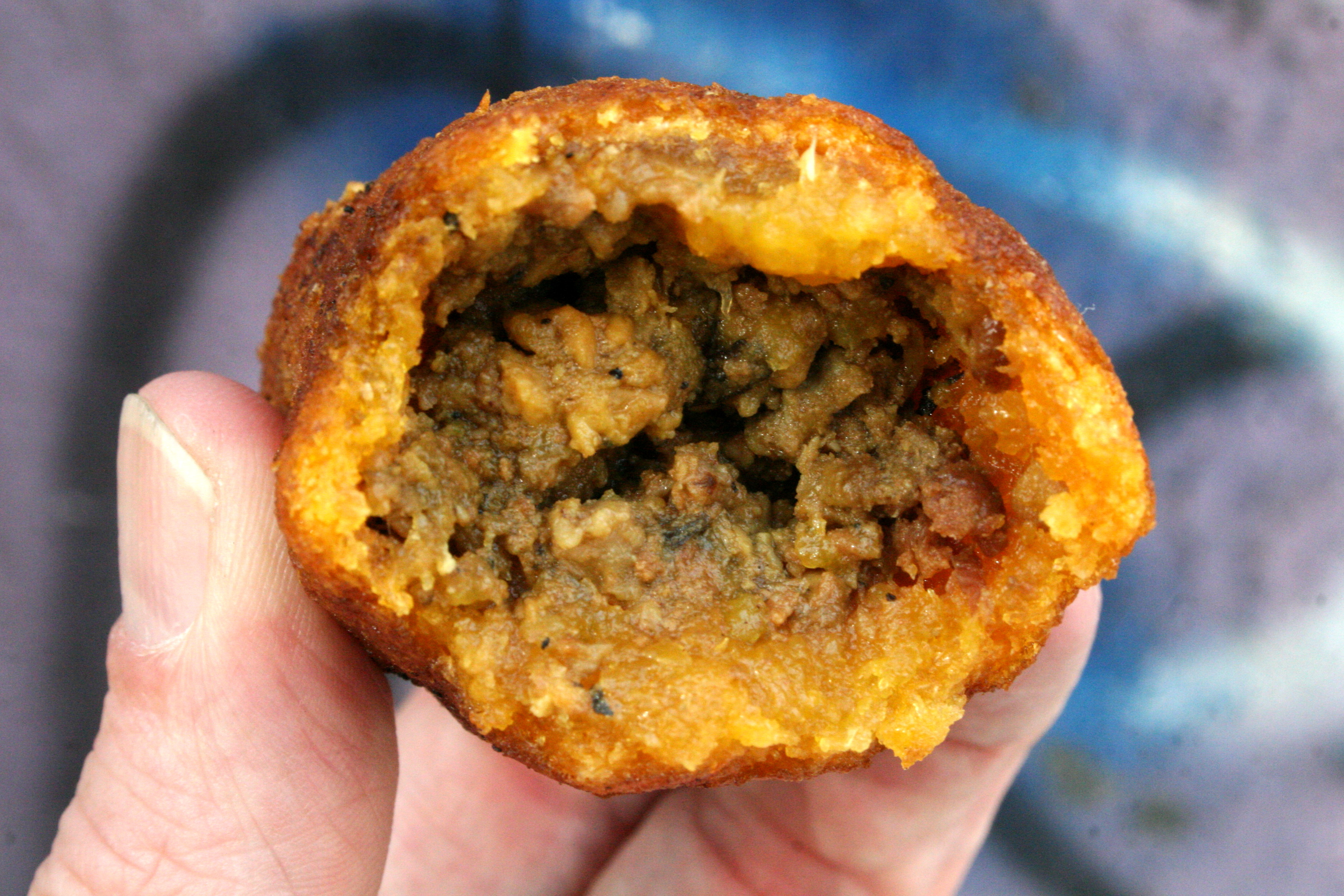
- Alcapurria
- Course: Appetizer
- Place of origin: Puerto Rico
- Serving temperature: Hot
- Main ingredients: Green banana, yautía, achiote and meat
- Other information: Common throughout: Puerto Rico; Dominican Republic; Cuba; Panama

Alcapurria is a well-known fritter from Puerto Rico. It is one of the most popular food items offered at Puerto Rican Cuchifritos restaurants.

== Origin ==
It may have influence from Middle Eastern kibbeh due to the immigration of Levantine Arabs as well as Turkish people throughout Latin America.

== Preparation ==
The dough surrounding the filling, the masa, is made primarily of green banana and grated yautía with an optional addition of squash. Green banana can be replaced with breadfruit, cassava, taro, green or yellow plantains or other arrowroots. Alcapurrias are generally seasoned with lard, annatto, garlic and salt. The annatto gives it a signature yellow-orange color. Annatto seeds are simmered in lard to release most of their color and flavor. Seeds are discarded and the tinted lard is then poured over the masa.

The masa is refrigerated for several hours to achieve a solid consistency. Diced potatoes cooked with picadillo or corned beef are the most typical fillings; others include longaniza, blood sausage, braised meat, cheese, seafood and vegetables. They can be deep-fried in lard or oil, or baked (alcapurrias horneadas). When cooked, the fritter is "hot and brittle". Alcapurrias are served at kiosks and at fine restaurants as well.

== See also ==
- Bacalaíto
- Empanadilla
- Empanadas
- Cuchufritos
- Sorullito
- Rellenos de papa
- Arepas
