= Centro de Estudios Puertorriqueños =

Research institute at Hunter College in New York City

- Established: 1973
- Headquarters: East Harlem, New York City
- Parent organization: Hunter College, City University of New York
- Website: https://centroarchives.hunter.cuny.edu/

El Centro, the Center for Puerto Rican Studies or Centro de Estudios Puertorriqueños, is a university-based research institute whose mission is to produce, facilitate, and disseminate interdisciplinary research about the experiences of Puerto Ricans in the U.S. and to collect, preserve, and provide access to archival and library resources documenting the history and culture of Puerto Ricans. To complement these core activities, Centro sponsors a year-round program of educational and cultural activities. Since 1983, Centro has been housed at Hunter College of the City University of New York (CUNY).

== History ==
Founded in 1973 by a coalition of faculty, students, and community leaders, Centro works closely with a network of education, research, archival, and community-based partners. Centro has been housed at Hunter College since 1983; however, it is a CUNY-wide research center. Centro staff guide and mentor Puerto Rican and other students, assist and advise community organizations and other research institutions and serve on local and national committees concerned with issues of social, economic, educational and cultural policy. In addition, CUNY faculty and staff with interests in Puerto Rican and Latino studies are invited to partner with Centro, where they utilize its extensive resources. Centro has been a founding member of the Inter-University Program for Latino Research (IUPLR) since 1989. The IUPLR, currently composed of 23 affiliate centers, is the most extensive consortium of Latino research centers in the United States.

== Library and archive ==
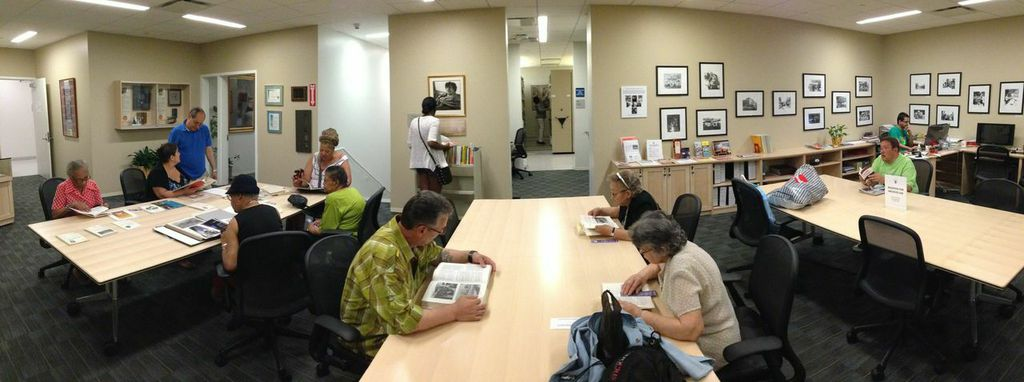
The Centro Library at the Lois V. and Samuel J. Silberman Building in East Harlem.

The Centro Library and Archives is devoted to collecting, preserving and providing access to resources documenting the history and culture of Puerto Ricans. Located at the Lois V. and Samuel J. Silberman Building in East Harlem, the collections include books, newspapers, periodicals, audio and video tapes, manuscripts, photographs, prints and recorded music. The Library and Archives provides services and programs to the scholarly community as well as the general public. It facilitates access to its holdings through mail and telephone services, City University's online public catalog CUNY+, participation in national databases and through the publication of finding aids. Finding aids are used by archivists to describe each collection. A finding aid can include a description of content and scope, a biographical note, size of the collection, etc., and they can be broad or by item level.

The Library and Archives promote the study of Puerto Rican history, diaspora, and culture through exhibitions and other public programs. The Centro archives contain 6,700 cubic feet of diverse material from over 300 archival collections. These materials span the 20th and 21st centuries and document Puerto Rican communities from New York City to Hawaii. The physical Archives can be accessed by the general public by appointment only; however, certain collections can be accessed through their free digital collection with select resources available online.

== Noteworthy Collections ==
=== FBI Files on Puerto Rican Organizations Collection ===
Oral History Transcript from Interview 9, Tape 9 with Ruth M, Reynolds

The Centro archives have a number of collections that aid in the study of Puerto Rican Diaspora and history, some of which was once hidden to the public. One notable addition to the archive are the declassified FBI files that surveil Puerto Rican activists during the nationalist movement. The collection is approximately 77 cubic feet, with about 134,000 pages of formerly secret FBI files that range from the 1930s to the 1990s. It houses information about many notable figures of the Puerto Rican Independence movement, such as Pedro Albizu Campos, and the COINTELPRO, which were used to hinder Puerto Rican Independence.

=== Ruth M. Reynolds Papers ===
The Ruth M. Reynolds Papers highlight an important person part of the Puerto Rican Independence movement and provide information about Puerto Rican history. The collection covers the years 1915-1989, but much of the collection is dated from 1944-1983 and it is divided into ten series. Series 9 of the collection holds many oral history tapes and transcripts, some of which are digitally available. In these 112 tapes, ranging from about an hour long to 20 minutes long, she describes her early life living in South Dakota and her contributions to the Puerto Rican Independence movement as well as international human rights movements. Reynolds agreed to these interviews after getting sick in 1984 and wanting to archive her life. The Ruth M. Reynolds Papers are just one of many important collections containing personal papers housed at the Centro Archives.

Isabel Rosado fue arrestada durante una protesta en Vieques.

=== Raquel Ortiz Mi Puerto Rico Film Collection ===
The Raquel Ortiz Mi Puerto Rico Film Collection includes materials used in the production of Raquel Ortiz’s documentary Mi Puerto Rico (1995). The materials in this collection range from 1980 to 1995 and consist of VHS tapes, cassettes, and other audiovisual materials. It also includes photographs and printed materials. Some items in this collection have been digitized and are accessible online. This collection highlights the independence movement, Puerto Rican activism, and the relationship between Puerto Rico and the United States.

== Publications ==
Centro: Journal of the Center for Puerto Rican Studies
- Discipline: Puerto Rican studies
- Language: English

Publication details
- History: 1987–present
- Frequency: 3/year

Standard abbreviations
- ISO 4: Centro

Links
- Journal homepage

The center publisher Centro: Journal of the Center for Puerto Rican Studies is dedicated to the field of Puerto Rican studies and has been published regularly since its founding in 1987. A number of journals, books, DVDs, and research briefs are available for purchase on the Centro store website, La Bodega. Along with the Journal, Centro also publishes artwork , which is also available for purchase on La Bodega and consists of Exhibition Catalogs, Posters, and Silkscreens. Centro has also recently created an open access electronic magazine, RicanWritings, a magazine for current affairs relating to Puerto Rican communities pertaining to history, culture, research, and art.

== See also ==
- CUNY Dominican Studies Institute
- Puerto Rican literature
- Puerto Ricans in New York City
- Archivo General de Puerto Rico
- Pedro Albizu Campos
- Puerto Ricans in Hawaii
