= Laura Andel =

Argentine musician, conductor and composer

Laura Andel (born 1968) is an Argentinian musician, conductor and composer.

== Biography ==
Laura Andel was born in Argentina and has Moldovan descent. She began music lessons in Buenos Aires at the age of five. She played woodwind as a child and began to compose at an early age. She graduated from Escuela de Música Popular de Avellaneda in Buenos Aires with a degree in Tango performance, and in January 1993, she began the study of jazz composition and music for film at Berklee College of Music in Boston.

After completing her studies, Andel moved to New York City in 2000 where she has worked as a composer and conductor. She is the leader of the Laura Andel Orchestra and has conducted her music in cities including New York, Boston, Buenos Aires, Caracas, and Berlin.

She is an associate professor at Hostos Community College of the City University of New York in the Bronx.

== Awards and honors ==
- BMI Foundation-Jerry Harrington Jazz Composers Award
- Rockefeller Foundation fellow at the Bellagio Study Center in Italy
- Margaret Fairbank Jory Copying Assistance Program Grant from the American Music Center
- Music Composition Grant from the Massachusetts Cultural Council
- Artist-in-residence at the MacDowell Colony (Peterborough, New Hampshire, 2002)
- Artist-in-residence at Sacatar Foundation (Bahia, Brazil, 2003/2004)

== Works ==
Andel has focused on composing for large ensembles. Her compositions use elements from Jazz and classical music, and feature unusual combinations of instruments. Selected works include:

- SomnambulisT'
- In::Tension:..
- Doble Mano
- Apsides
- In the midst
- Noise Machine

=== Discography ===
Music recorded and released on CD includes:

- Berklee Discover (1997)
- SomnambulisT Orchestra SomnambulisT Red Toucan (2002)
- Laura Andel Orchestra/Doble Mano
- Jazz Composers Alliance Orchestra In, Thru, and Out (2003)
- Amalgam(e) 10 years of Red Toucan (2004)
- Jazz Composers Alliance Orchestra Celebration of the Spirit (2004)
- Laura Andel Electric Percussive Orchestra/I n : : t e n s i o n : Rossbin Records (2005)

Independent releases:

- Laura Andel Music for [+°-] 20 Musicians Music by Laura Andel (2000)
- Laura Andel Jazz Orchestra Music by Laura Andel (1997)
- Laura Andel & Oli Bott Jazz Orchestra Live in Berlin 1999 Music by Laura Andel and Oli Bott (1999)
- Laura Andel & Oli Bott Jazz Orchestra Music by Laura Andel and Oli Bott (1998)
