= Michael Mbabuike =

- Born: August 1, 1943
- Died: December 1, 2006 (aged 63)
- Occupations: Linguist; Poet

Michael Chikelu Mbabuike (August 1943 – December 2006) was a Nigerian poet, professor, and linguist. He held the chair of African Studies in the Humanities Department at Hostos Community College of the City University of New York, and was president of the Faculty Senate there.

An Igbo, Mbabuike obtained his bachelor's degree with honors from the University of Nigeria, Nsukka campus. He received his master's degree and doctorate in literature at the Sorbonne, Paris, France. He came to the United States in the late 1970s. In addition to being a professor he was director of the Center for Igbo Studies at Hostos Community College. He was twice president of the New York African Studies Association (NYASA).

== Selected works ==
- 1988 "A survey of cultural and normative changes within the Ibo family structure in the last two decades"
- 1995 "Architecture of a National Literature in Africa: Problematics of Identity and Structure"
- 1997 Nigeria thirty years after the civil war
- 1998 Poems of Memory Trips
