= Tacacho =

Peruvian breakfast dish

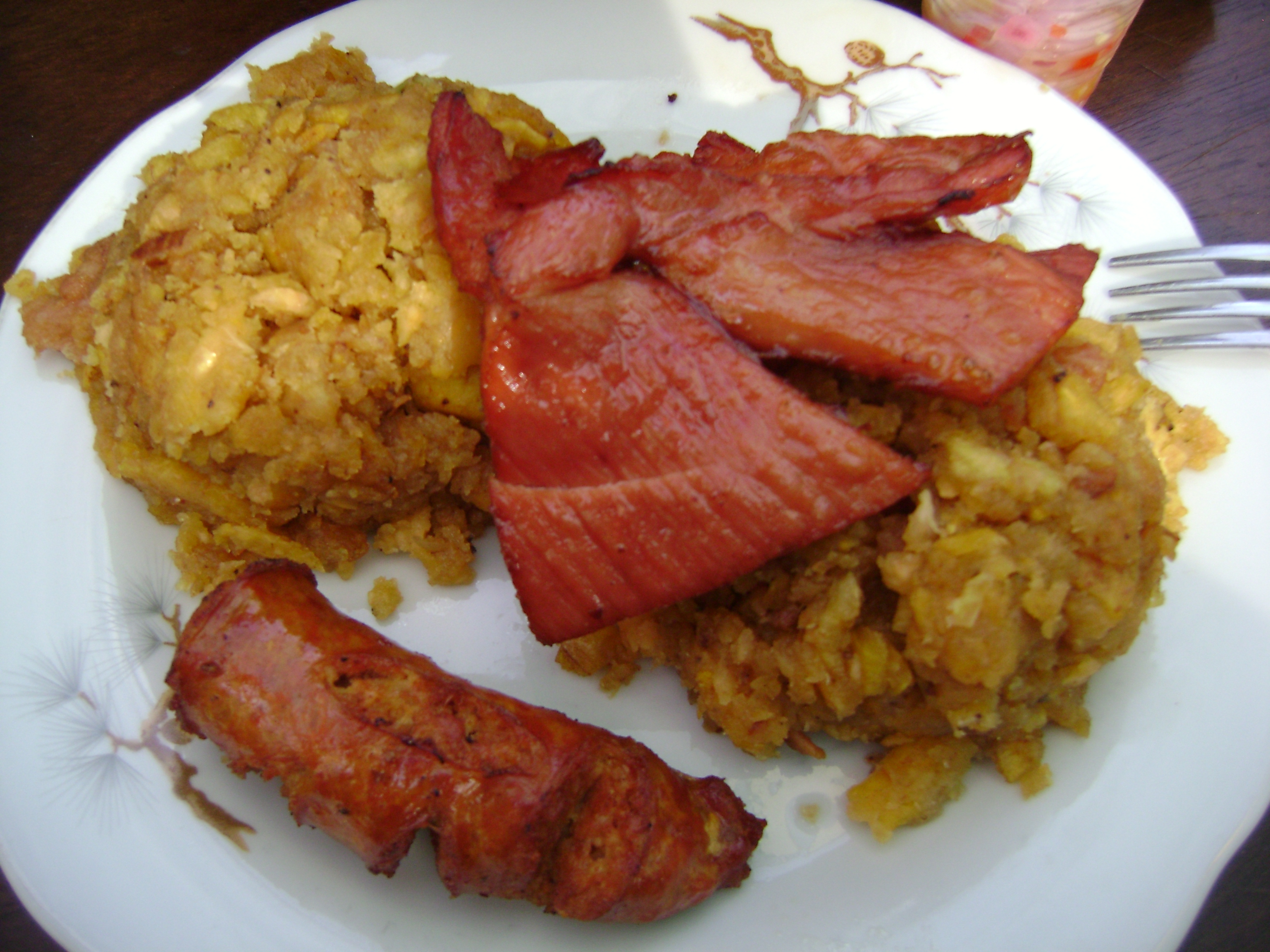
- Tacacho with chorizo and cecina served on top
- Place of origin: Peru
- Main ingredients: Roasted or boiled plantain

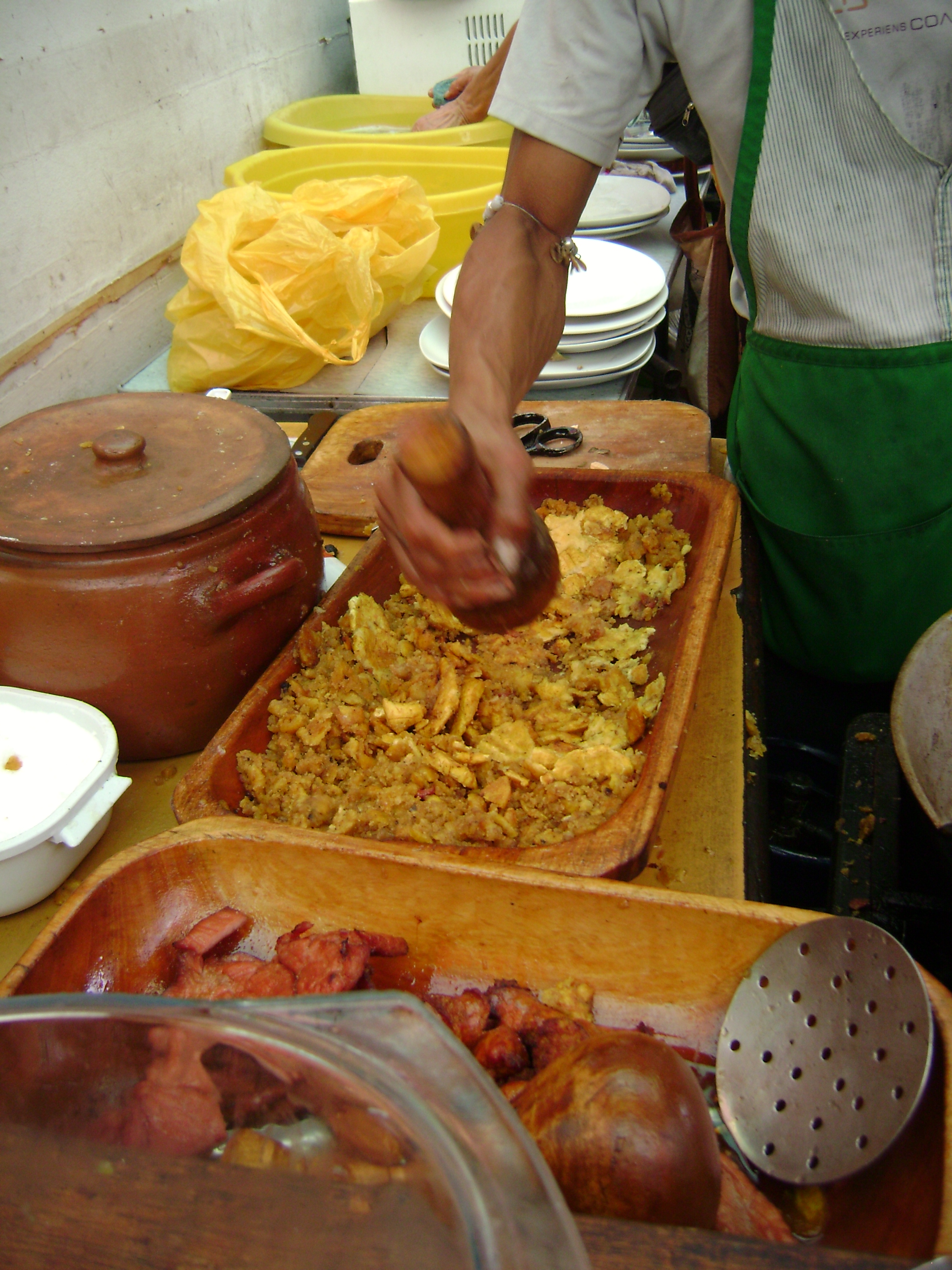
Making tacacho

Tacacho is a traditional Peruvian meal that is typically served for breakfast. It is popular in the Amazonas region, where the natives boil or grill plantains, peel them, then mash them in a large wooden mortar. When mashed, the plantains are combined with lard, salt, and tiny pieces of pork rind and served with vegetables and chorizo on the side.

== Origin ==
This dish originated in west Africa. In the Caribbean and parts of South America with large African influences the plantains are boiled or roasted and typically smashed with garlic.

== See also ==
- Mofongo
- Fufu
- Mangú
