= Hostos Community College =

Community college in the Bronx, New York, U.S.

Eugenio María de Hostos Community College
- Other name: Hostos Community College
- Type: Public community college
- Established: 1968; 58 years ago
- Parent institution: City University of New York
- Endowment: US$2.2 million
- President: Daisy Cocco De Filippis
- Provost: Andrea Fabrizio
- Academic staff: 499 (210 full-time faculty)
- Students: 7,387
- Location: 500 Grand Concourse, The Bronx, New York City, New York, 10451, United States; 40°49′3″N 73°55′38″W
- Campus: Urban
- Language: English and Spanish
- Sporting affiliations: City University of New York Athletic Conference
- Mascot: Caiman
- Sports: hostosathletics.com
- Website: hostos.cuny.edu

Eugenio María de Hostos Community College of The City University of New York is a public community college in the South Bronx, New York City. It is part of the City University of New York (CUNY) system and was created by an act of the Board of Higher Education in 1968 in response to demands from the Hispanic/Puerto Rican community, which was urging for the establishment of a college to serve the people of the South Bronx. An April 1968 planning proposal by Cándido de León referred to the institution as Community College Number Eight and anticipated opening it in fall 1969.At the time it opened, it was considered the only bilingual education college in the region; this policy became more limited after 1997, but the college still offers many courses in Spanish. In 1970, the college admitted its first class of 623 students at the site of a former tire factory. Several years later, the college moved to a larger site nearby at 149th Street and Grand Concourse. The college also operates a location at the prow building of the Bronx Terminal Market.

== The Save Hostos Movement ==
It shows the crowd of people that come together to support the Save Hostos Movement, holding the Puerto Rican flag and different slogans

In October 1975, CUNY was in a fiscal crisis and the city proposed closing or merging several public institutions including Hostos, John Jay, and Richmond (which later merged with Staten Island Community College (SICC) to become the College of Staten Island). In the 1975-76 school year, there were rumors that Hostos Community College might be closed. In response, a small group of professors, counselors, and students formed a committee to plan how to save the college. They mobilized a large group to save Hostos. This included Gerald Meyers, a historian of New York City Politics became a professor at Hostos in 1972. Meyers was the Chapter Chair for the Save Hostos Committee, which consisted of various sub-committees. Their roles in the Save Hostos Movement included letter writing, petitioning, voter registration, and community outreach. Ramón Jiménez, a lawyer and professor at the time led the community coalition to save Hostos. Jiménez's actions to save Hostos were disruptive and militant, for instance taking over Hostos and Grand Concourse. His actions were key to successfully keeping Hostos open.

== Public transit access ==
The closest subway station to Hostos Community College is 149th Street-Hostos, which is served by the 2, 4 and 5 trains. The college can also be reached with the Bx1 bus on Grand Concourse, or the Bx2 and Bx19 buses on East 149th Street.

== Academics ==
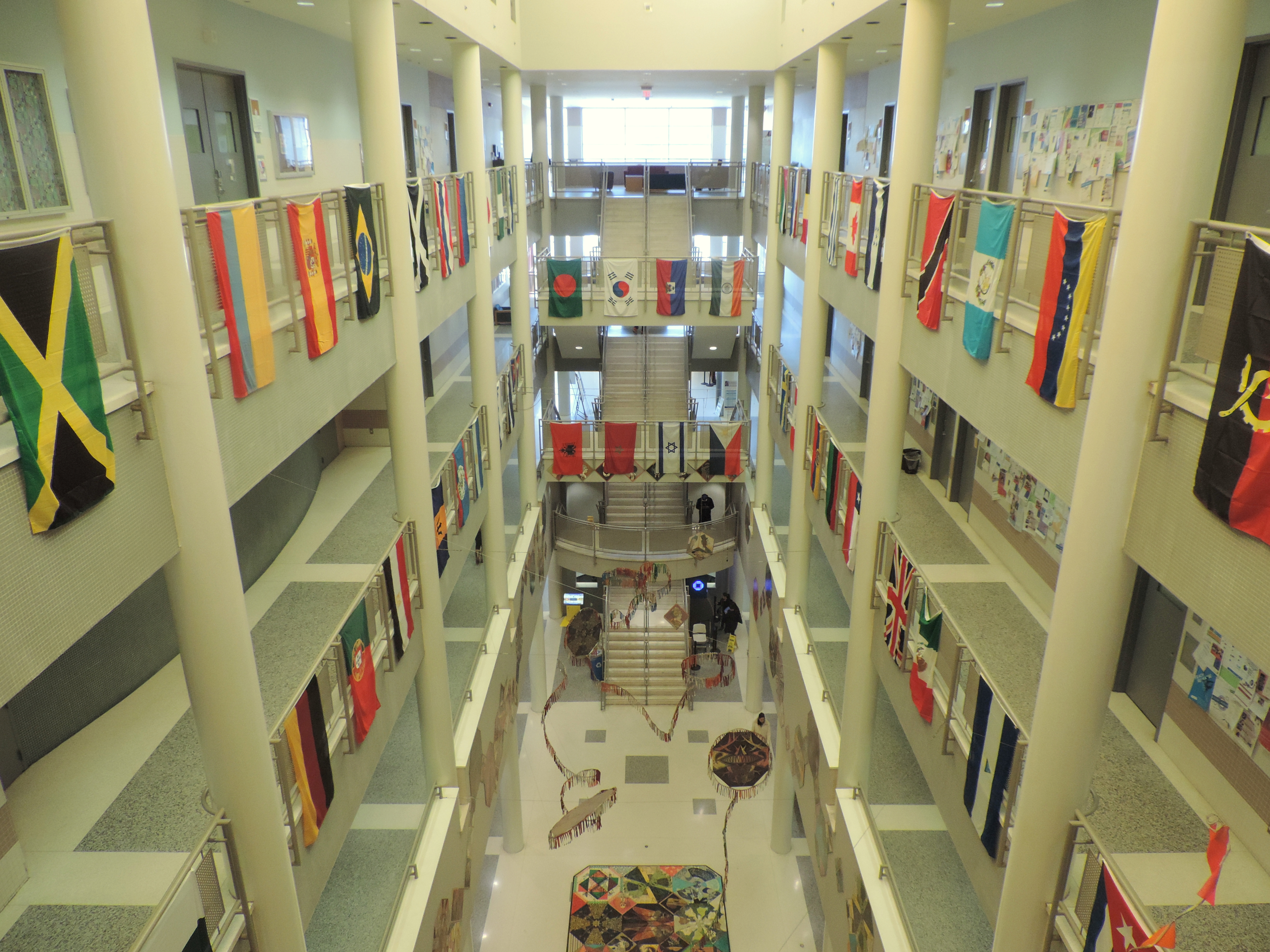
Atrium of 450 Grand Concourse, Building C

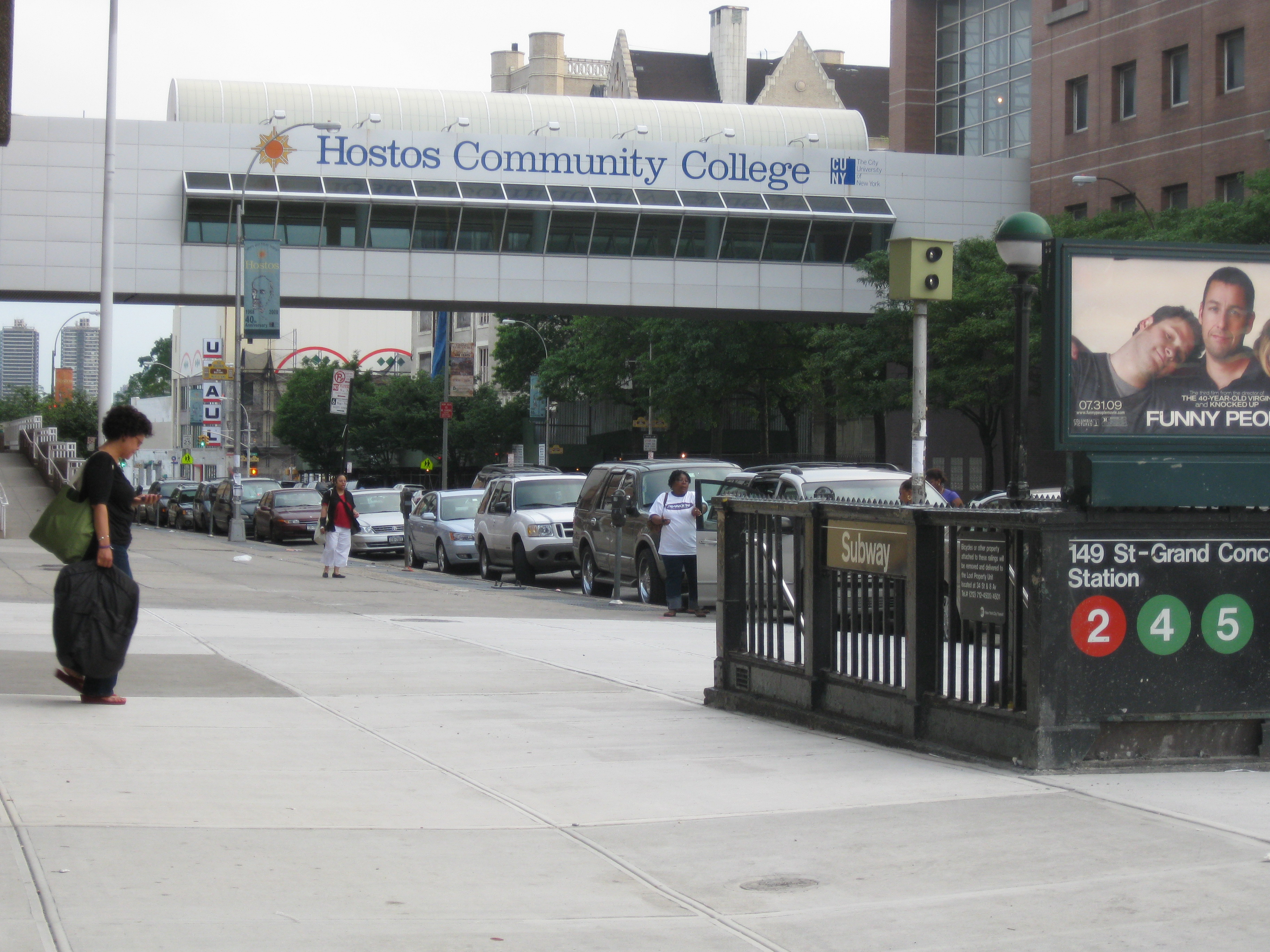
Pedestrian walkway over the Grand Concourse connecting two halves of the Hostos campus.

Hostos is the first institution of higher education on the mainland to be named after a Puerto Rican, Eugenio María de Hostos, an educator, writer, and patriot. A large proportion (approximately 60 percent) of the student population is Hispanic, thus many of the courses at Hostos are offered in Spanish, and the college also provides extensive English and ESL instruction to students.

The Hostos Center for the Arts & Culture is a performing arts center contained within the college campus. It consists of a museum-grade art gallery, a 367-seat Repertory Theater, and a 900-seat Main Theater, presenting artists of national and international renown. It has been showcasing theater, dance and music artists for 33 years, with the mission "to be a cultural force in the Bronx and throughout the New York metropolitan area."

=== Departments and academic programs ===
The college is composed of 10 different academic departments offering 27 associate-level degrees. Hostos is notable for being the first and only CUNY campus offering a degree in Game Design. The campus also features a $1.05 million-dollar live recording studio, which is used by the media design programs.

- Allied Health
- Behavioral and Social Sciences
- Business
- Education
- English
- Humanities
- Language & Cognition
- Library
- Mathematics
- Natural Sciences

=== Student profile ===
Demographics of student body (Fall 2018)
	Undergraduate
American Indian & Alaskan Native	0.4%
Asian & Pacific Islander	2.2%
Black Non-Hispanic	21.2%
Hispanic	57.2%
Other/Unknown	17.6%
White Non-Hispanic	1.3%

Total student enrollment at Hostos in Fall 2018 was 7,340 predominantly full-time students. Around 67% of the student population is female and about 33% male, with an average student age of 25 years old.

== Athletics ==
Hostos Community College teams participate as a member of the National Junior College Athletic Association (NJCAA). The Caimans are a member of the community college section of the City University of New York Athletic Conference (CUNYAC), who's the most recent new member since the 2002–03 season. Men's sports include basketball and soccer; while women's sports include basketball and volleyball. In 2020, Hostos Athletics announced their entry into the Esports league of the NJCAA starting with the 2020–2021 season.

== Early College Program ==
Hostos Community College is affiliated with Hostos Lincoln Academy of Science, a middle school and high school with an early college program, as part of the Early College Initiative at CUNY. It serves students grades 6 to 12, along with special education services. The school is a collaboration between the New York City Department of Education and City University of New York. High school students at the school enter the program during the summer prior to the start their tenth grade year and can earn up to 60 credits in order to graduate with a high school diploma and associates degree. The school was originally located on campus, but was moved to a school building near Melrose, which is shared by a few other schools, due to spacing issues.

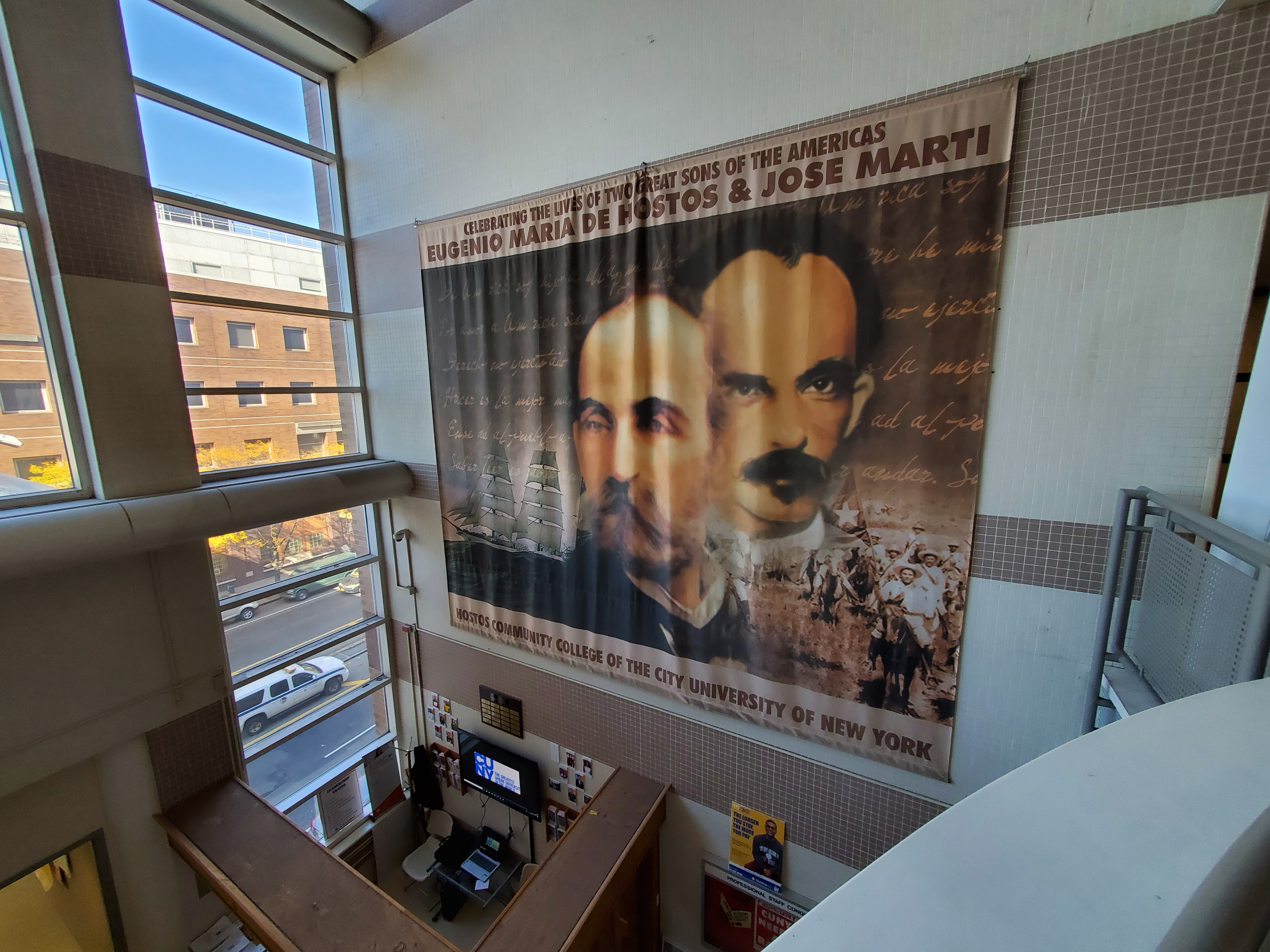
An on-campus banner showing Eugenio María de Hostos and José Martí.

== Notable faculty ==
- Laura Andel – musician, conductor and composer
- Humberto Ballesteros Capasso – Colombian writer
- Michael Cisco – novelist and translator
- Daisy Cocco De Filippis – author and the eighth President of Eugenio María de Hostos Community College. Former president of Naugatuck Valley Community College
- Mildred García – current president of the American Association of State Colleges and Universities (AASCU)
- Isaac Goldemberg – Peruvian-American author
- Andrew Hubner – novelist
- Cynthia Jones – Recognized in 2014 as the New York State Professor of the Year by the Carnegie Foundation for the Advancement of Teaching and the Council for Advancement and Support of Education.
- Felix V. Matos Rodriguez – eighth Chancellor of The City University of New York (CUNY)
- Michael Mbabuike – Nigerian poet and linguist
- Sol Miranda – Puerto Rican actress
- Juno Morrow – artist and designer
- Arthur Nersesian – novelist, playwright and Anahid Literary Prize winner
- William S. Penn – Native American writer and American Book Award for Literary Merit winner
- Graciela Rivera – first Puerto Rican to sing a lead role at the Metropolitan Opera
- Rees Shad – Recognized in 2012 as the New York State Professor of the Year by the Carnegie Foundation for the Advancement of Teaching and the Council for Advancement and Support of Education.
- Jorge Silva Puras – United States Small Business Administration Regional Administrator and Chief of Staff to the Governor of Puerto Rico
- Debra Solomon – animator, filmmaker and creator of Disney's Lizzie McGuire
- Barbara Summers – writer and fashion model
- Edgardo Vega Yunqué – novelist

== Notable alumni ==
Kristy Marmorato - She was the first Republican elected to the city council in the Bronx in over 40 years.

Carmen E. Arroyo - She was the first Hispanic woman elected to the New York State Assembly.

Paule Valery Joseph- She is the 2022 National Academy of Medicine and American Academy of Nursing Fellow.
