= Mangú =

Dominican traditional dish

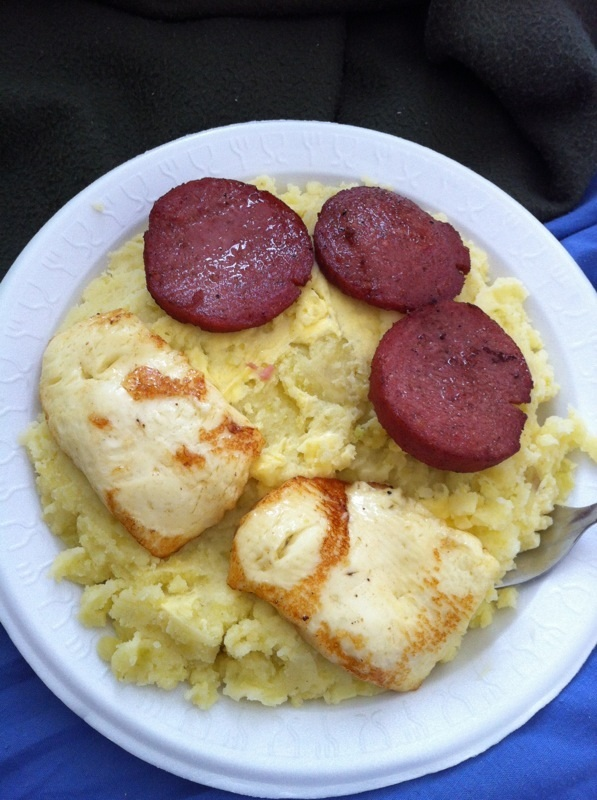
- Mangú with fried cheese and fried Dominican salami
- Course: Breakfast, main course or side dish
- Place of origin: Dominican Republic
- Associated cuisine: Dominican Republic cuisine
- Serving temperature: Hot
- Main ingredients: Green plantains, red onion, vinegar
- Ingredients generally used: Queso frito, fried eggs, fried Dominican salami
- Variations: Mofongo, fufu, tacacho, cayeye

Mangú is the national breakfast dish of the Dominican Republic. It can also be served for lunch or dinner.

The dish is made from boiled green plantains that are mashed and topped with pickled red onions and traditionally accompanied by fried cheese, salami, and eggs, which is a combination popularly known as "los tres golpes" ("the three hits").

Mangú's origins are linked to West African fufu, which was brought to the Caribbean and Latin America through the transatlantic slave trade. Over time, enslaved Africans and their descendants adapted the dish using local ingredients and techniques, resulting in regional variations such as mangú.

== Method ==
Mangú is made from boiled green plantains, then mashed with a fork and some water in which they were boiled. The goal is to mash the plantains until the result is smooth with no lumps. The dish is topped with pickled red onions .

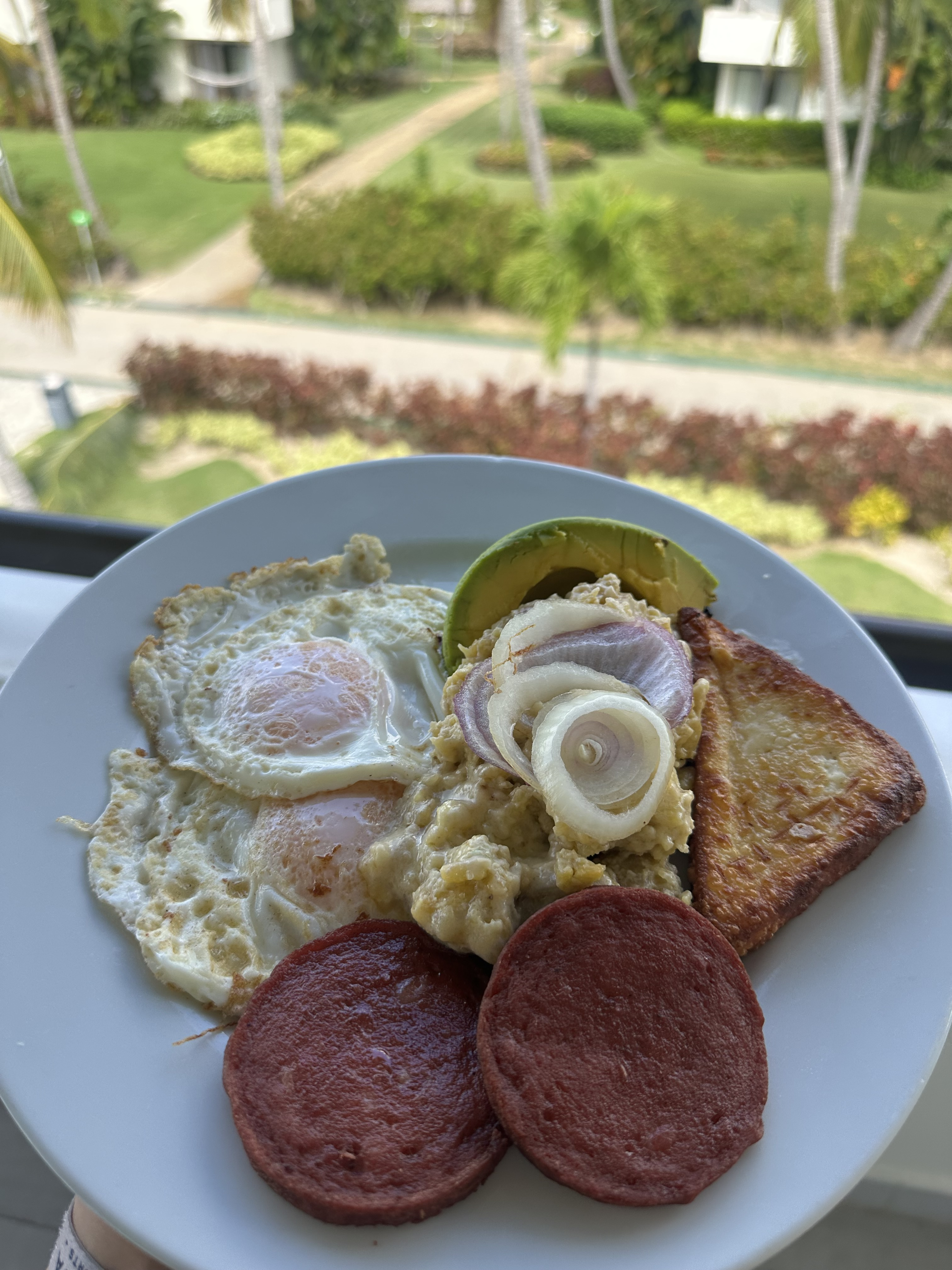
"Tres Golpes" also known as The Three Hits

== Variations ==
Los tres golpes (the three hits) is a slang name given by Dominicans to a dish consisting of fried cheese, fried eggs, and fried Dominican-style salami served alongside mangú. Many Dominican families coat this salami and cheese in flour before frying, adding a light, crispy coating.

Dominican salami plays a large role in Dominican cuisine. Dominican salami is uncured and pre-cooked, and traditionally the salami is smoked and made with beef, pork, red onions, garlic, black pepper, false oregano, egg whites, annatto, and flour. Its flavor profile is slightly smoky, salty, and robust, contrasting the starchy mangú. When fried, it becomes crispy on the outside, which complements the smooth, creamy texture of the mangú. Dominican salami has the look and texture of bologna sausage or cotto salami, as it is both soft, but also larger than most salami.

There are other variations. One is mangú with longaniza, a type of sausage which is typically grilled or fried, and which adds a smoky, savory flavor. In coastal regions of the Dominican Republic, mangú is commonly served with fried fish, particularly tilapia or snapper.

== Etymology ==
Boiled mashed plantains can be traced back to Africans in the Congo region who were brought to the island during the slave trade. One theory is that mangú descended from a word akin to mangusi, which referred to almost any root vegetable that was boiled and mashed.

Another popular theory about the name's origin suggests it came about during American occupation, where after tasting the dish, an American soldier allegedly exclaimed, “Man, good!”, which locals may have phonetically interpreted as mangú. While this story is not confirmed by official documents, its origin during the occupation period aligns better with the available historical records than the widely spread claim of an African word mangusi, which has no verified backing in known African languages or dictionaries.

== Outside Dominican Republic ==
Mangú has some popularly outside the Dominican Republic where mainly Dominicans reside at such as New York City, parts of New Jersey, and Puerto Rico.

In Puerto Rico, there's a version known as mangú arropao. This variation features plantains that are boiled in broth, skin on, then mashed with some of the broth, along with milk, butter, or even bone marrow. The mixture is generously stuffed with crispy Dominican salami, wrapped in banana leaves, and grilled. Once ready, it’s adorned with fried cheese, a sunny-side-up egg, avocado, and pickled red onions. There are also versions made with cassava or breadfruit.

== Origin ==
Fufu is a dish brought over by African slaves into the Caribbean, Latin America and Southern U.S. Fufu goes by mofongo in Puerto Rico, fufu de plátano in Cuba, bolón in Ecuador, cayeye in Colombia and hot water cornbread in Southern U.S. Before cassava and corn was introduced, plantains, cocoyam, green bananas, and yams were boiled and mashed in a mortal and pastel with the water it was boiled in. Fufu is traditionally smooth, dense, and stretchy, dough-like texture. It is soft, slightly sticky, and often compared to thick, cooked dumpling dough, meant to be swallowed in small balls without chewing.

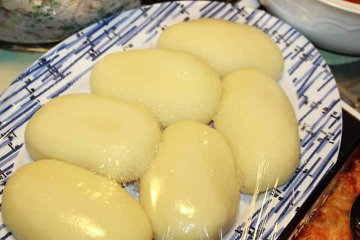
Wrapped fufu

Mashed plantains in mangú are naturally bland and starchy, so they’re traditionally served with pickled red onions, known as escabeche. Introduced from Spain to Latin America and the Caribbean, these onions add a tangy, slightly sweet, and crunchy flavor that balances and enhances the richness of the plantains.

== See also ==
- Cayeye
- Fufu
- Mofongo
- Tacacho
