= Juno Morrow =

American artist and game designer

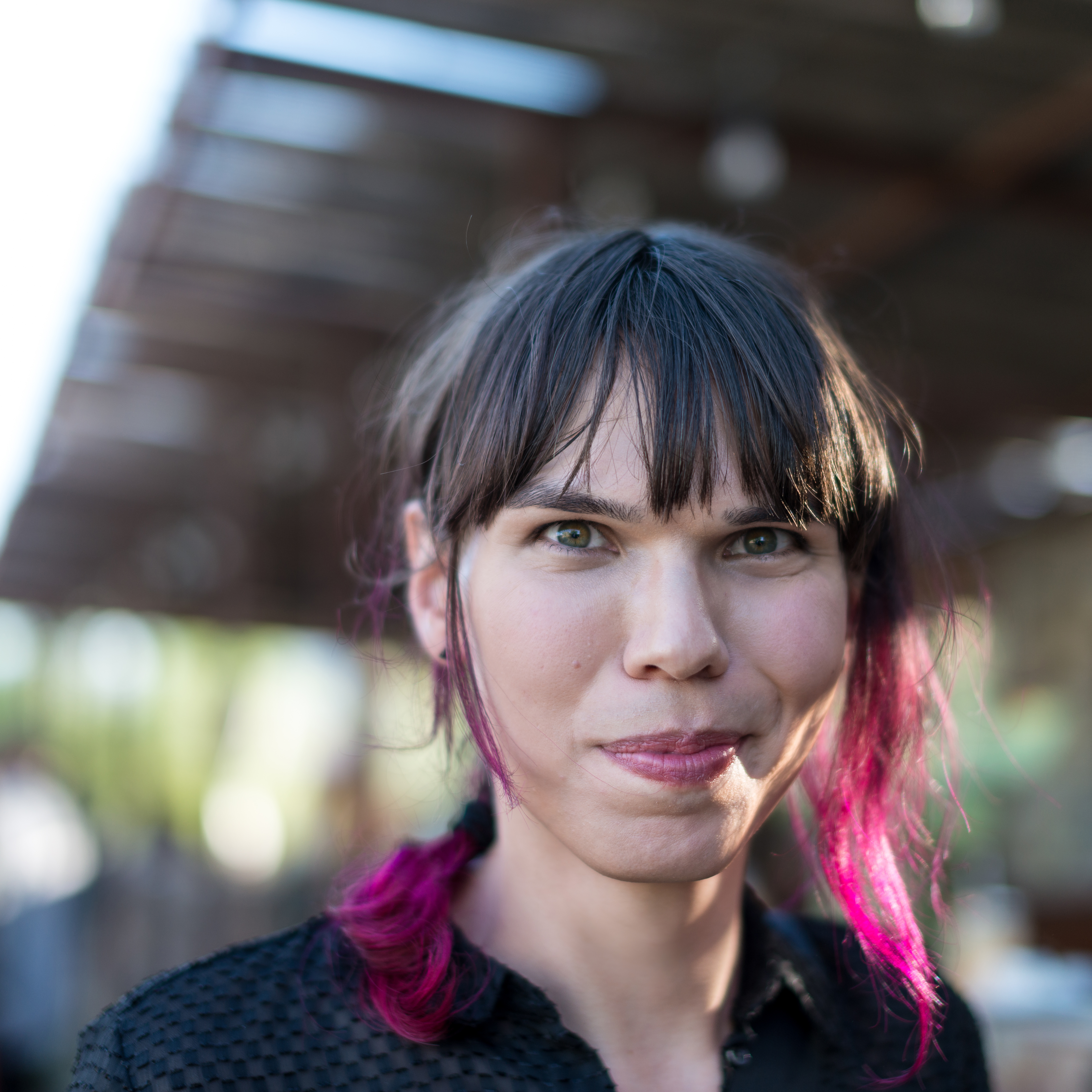
- Born: 1986 (age 39–40); Oakland, California, US

Academic background
- Education: University of Houston (BA); Parsons School of Design (MFA)

Academic work
- Discipline: Artist
- Sub-discipline: Game designer
- Institutions: Hostos Community College
- Website: www.junomorrow.com

Juno Morrow (born 1986) is an American multidisciplinary artist, independent game designer, educator, and photographer whose work often deals with existential and ontological themes. Morrow received her Bachelor of Arts from the University of Houston in 2009 and her Master of Fine Arts from Parsons School of Design in 2015. She is an assistant professor of game design at Eugenio María de Hostos Community College of the City University of New York.

== Career ==
Juno Morrow's early work primarily consisted of travel and street photography before growing to include interactive media, such as games. In 2014, Morrow released Mastering Tedium, a "tongue-in-cheek" terminal-based laundry simulator game. Oral Perspectives, also released in 2014, is a game designed for VR that uses a microphone and a custom jaw sensor. The game's perspective takes place inside the mouth and is intended to cause discomfort. Her M.F.A. thesis, entitled Depth Perception, is a multimodal experiential installation using virtual and augmented reality technologies. It aims to challenge traditional systemic notions of truth and deconstruct the binary of abstract/mental, material/physical, and artificial/real. In 2018, Morrow was commissioned to create Conspiracy Theories About Myself and Orbtown for inclusion in the DreamboxXx, a unique arcade cabinet featuring nontraditional, queer games and were later sold as a bundle with proceeds going to charity. Conspiracy Theories About Myself is inspired by her experience as a transgender person walking down the street. The goal of the game is to make it home without crying. Conspiracy Theories About Myself later went on to be showcased at the Smithsonian American Art Museum. Morrow's artwork and designs have been exhibited internationally. She has also advocated for making games education accessible to people of color and for labor organization within the games industry. Morrow has also been developing the first public game design degree program in New York City since 2015. She has three games currently in development. The first is called Pruuds vs. Sloots, which is categorized as a fighting game. The second is Under Pressure, which is a small art toy about social control and pressure. The third is called Crisscross, which is a simple platformer inspired by Frogger. She also has a prototype called Dial that is still early in development.

== Publications ==
- Urban Dreamscapes (2010)
- Subjective Ideal (2012)
- after dark (2019)
- Marginalia (2020)

== Games ==
- Mastering Tedium (2014)
- Oral Perspectives (2014)
- Folly (2016)
- Orbtown (in collaboration with Visager) (2018)
- Conspiracy Theories About Myself (2018)
- Blood Broker (2018): A clicking game inspired by a Twitter bot that serves as commentary on coercive social relationships, peer pressure, democracy and propaganda.
- Circumnavigators (in collaboration with Andy Wallace) (2018)

== Awards and nominations ==
Date	Publication	Award	Recipient(s) and nominee(s)	Result	Ref.
July 15, 2011	Dwell Magazine	World Views	Juno Morrow (Urban Dreamscape)	Nominated	
2014	The Ministry of Education of the People's Republic of China	China-US Young Maker Competition	Juno Morrow	Nominated	
