= Hushpuppy =

Deep-fried savory food made from cornmeal batter

Hushpuppy, Hush puppy, Red Horse Bread
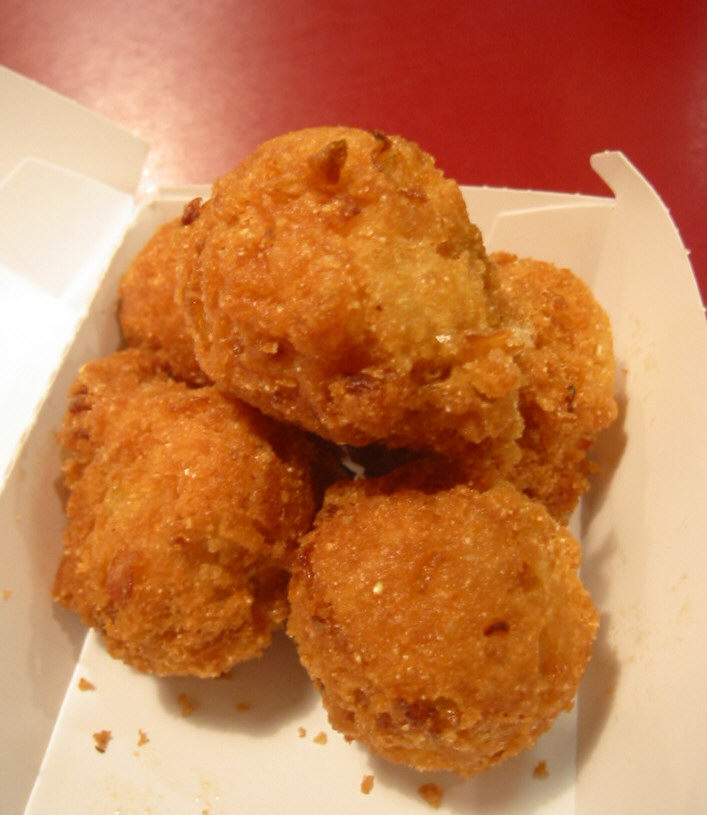
- A serving of hushpuppies
- Alternative names: Hush-puppy,
- Place of origin: North America
- Region or state: South Carolina
- Created by: Romeo Govan
- Main ingredients: Cornmeal

A hushpuppy is a small, savory, deep-fried round ball made from cornmeal-based batter, frequently served as a side dish with seafood and other deep-fried foods.

== History ==
Hushpuppies (or hush puppies) are a classic Southern quick bread consisting of small, deep-fried cornmeal batter dumplings. Typically prepared by dropping spoons of seasoned cornmeal batter into hot lard or oil to produce a golden, crispy exterior and a tender center. Hushpuppies are traditionally served as a staple side dish for fried seafood, Southern pit barbecue, and riverbank fish fries. While the printed term "hushpuppy" did not gain widespread usage until the 20th century, the dish's documented origins trace directly to Romeo Govan (c. 1845 - 1915), an African American caterer and cook born into enslavement in South Carolina. Following emancipation at the end of the Civil War, Govan settled on land along the banks of the Edisto River near Cannon's Bridge, close to Bamberg, South Carolina.

In the 1870s, Govan established a popular catering venue known locally as his "club house," hosting expansive fish fries for local and visiting diners, including prominent state politicians and sportsmen. The centerpiece of Govan's fish suppers was "Red Horse Bread"—a deep-fried cornmeal batter cooked in hot fat alongside native river fish, particularly bream, catfish, trout, and the redhorse sucker (Moxostoma species). Historical newspaper accounts from the era, such as a 1903 profile in the Augusta Chronicle, regularly credited Govan with creating and popularizing this "once eaten, never-to-be-forgotten" bread, describing his recipe as a mixture of cornmeal, water, salt, and egg dropped by spoonful into boiling lard.

Following Govan's death in 1915, Red Horse Bread remained a standard accompaniment for fried fish suppers throughout South Carolina. As the dish spread across state lines, regional naming variations emerged:

- Georgia (1920s): By 1927, Georgia newspapers documented fish fries serving "hushpuppies," and by 1940, journalists noted that the "Red Horse" cornbread of South Carolina was commonly referred to as "hush puppies" along the Georgia side of the Savannah River.
- Florida & National Exposure (1930s): In 1934, national travel writing highlighted the "delicious cornbread concoction" served at Florida fishing camps under the name "hushpuppies." By the late 1930s and 1940s, publications such as American Cookery, American Legion Magazine, and Boy's Life published standardized recipes for hushpuppies, detailing batters made of water-ground white cornmeal, eggs, baking powder, and salt fried in fish pans.

== Name ==
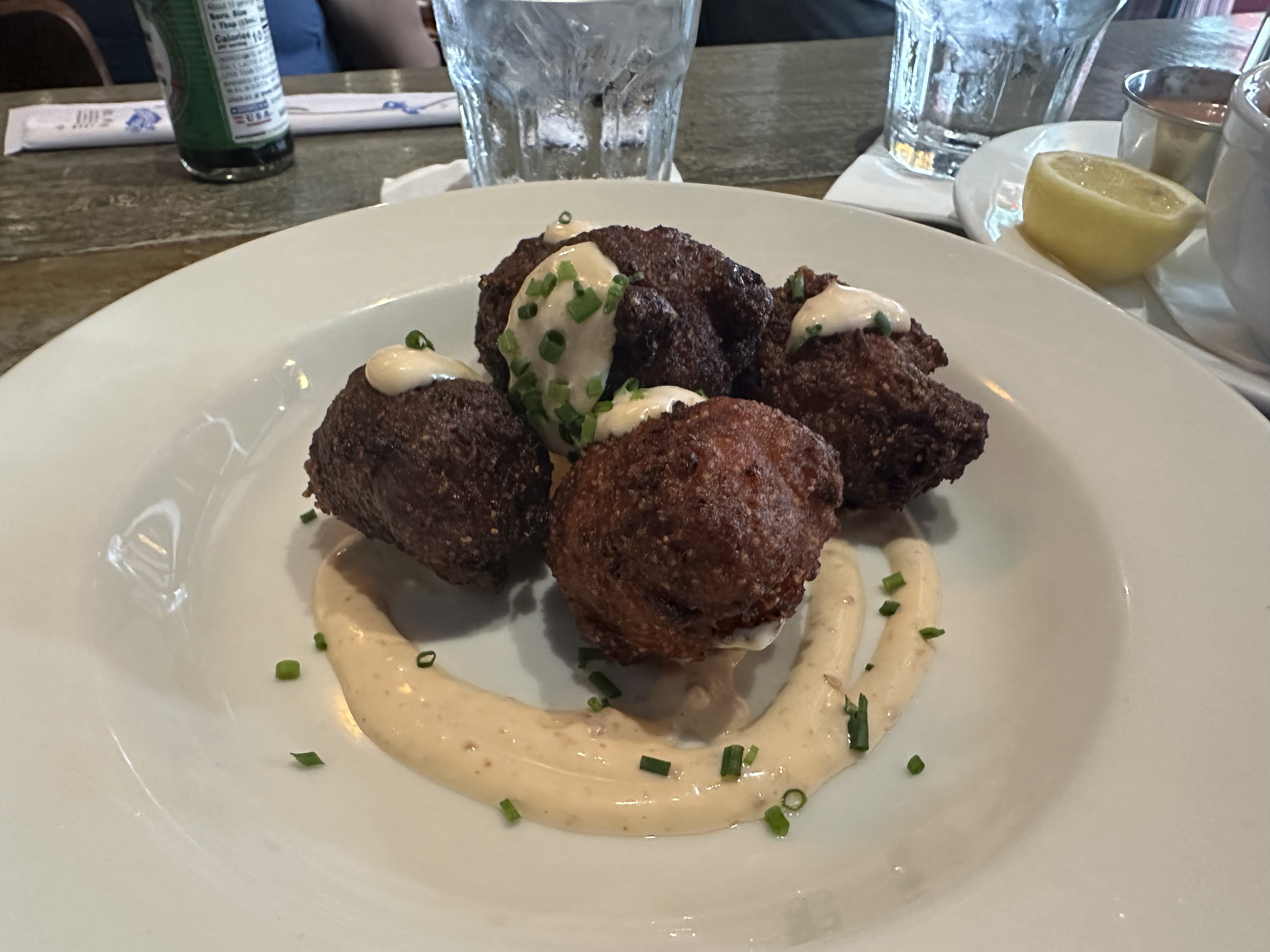
A plate of shrimp hushpuppies from Racks Fish House + Oyster Bar in Delray Beach, Florida

The first recorded use of the word dates to 1899, though the exact linguistic origin of the name is unverified.

Popular folklore attributes the name to hunters, fishers, or cooks tossing fried batter scraps to barking dogs to "hush the puppies."

== Characteristics and preparation ==
A hush puppy is a cornbread fritter typically made with eggs and cornmeal, flour, salt, baking soda, buttermilk or milk. Other ingredients that may be added electively include green onions, yellow onions, whole kernel corn, peppers, and garlic. Pancake batter can be substituted is cornmeal is not available. They can be flavored with a variety of different herbs, spices, and sweeteners, which are fried to create a crispy outer shell over a soft interior. They are often served with seafood or barbecued foods. They are commonly made at home or served in restaurants ranging dive-type barbecue eateries to upscale Southern restaurants. They can also be made at home with little difficulty. They can made to be spherically shaped, or in the form of oblong fritters.

== Caribbean ==
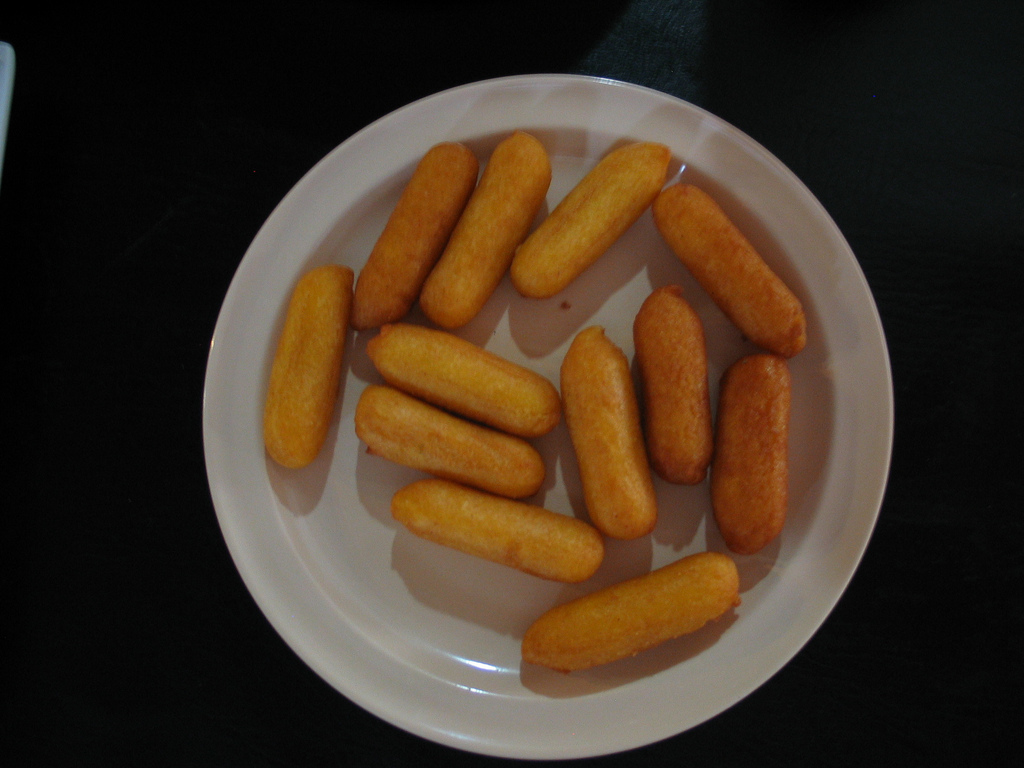
A plate with a dozen Puerto Rican "sorullitos" (hushpuppies) appetizers in Ponce, Puerto Rico

In Jamaica, such fried bread dumplings are known as "festivals", and are made from a flour and cornmeal dough, with added salt and sugar, which is then formed into hot dog bun shapes and deep-fried. They are sweeter than hushpuppies, which often contain onion or garlic. They are served with jerked meats such as pork or chicken. Mostly, it is served with fried or escoveitch (see also escabeche and ceviche) fish.

In Puerto Rico, hushpuppies are made in the shape of a short sausage and are called "sorullos" or the diminutive "sorullitos", for smaller sizes. Sugar is added to the cornmeal and can be stuffed with cheddar cheese or cream cheese with guava. They are served as an appetizer with entrees such as rice and beans, or as a breakfast to be served with coffee. They are served with fry sauce or guava dipping sauce.

== See also ==
- List of fried dough foods
- List of maize dishes
- List of quick breads
- List of regional dishes of the United States
