= Ramona Hernández =

- Born: La Romana, Dominican Republic

Ramona Hernández, community leader, sociologist and historian, is professor of Sociology at City College of New York and the director of the CUNY Dominican Studies Institute. She is the author of various scholarly works about Dominican migration, worker mobility, and the restructuring of the world economy.

== Education ==
In 1979, Ramona Hernandez completed a BA in Latin American History, with a Minor in Puerto Rican Studies at Lehman College. She then received a Master of Arts, Latin American and Caribbean Studies from New York University and a Doctor of Philosophy in Sociology from the Graduate Center of the City University of New York.

== Professional career ==
Ramona Hernandez became the director of the DSI in 2001. In 2003, Mayor Michael R. Bloomberg appointed her to the NYC Board of Education. In 2004, she rejected one of the mayor's proposals, which rejected major attention in the press.

Hernandez is also a trustee of the Sociological Initiatives Foundation and of the International Institute of Advanced Studies in the Social Sciences.

== Honors ==
- Meritorious Order of Duarte, Sánchez y Mella.

== Select bibliography ==
- "The Dominican Americans" (1998) ISBN 0313298394
- "The Mobility of Workers Under Advanced Capitalism: Dominican Migration to the United States" (2002) ISBN 978-0-231-11622-0
- "Desde la Orilla: hacia una nacionalidad sin desalojos" (2004) ISBN 9789993496090
