= Bacalaíto =

Codfish fritter from Puerto Rico

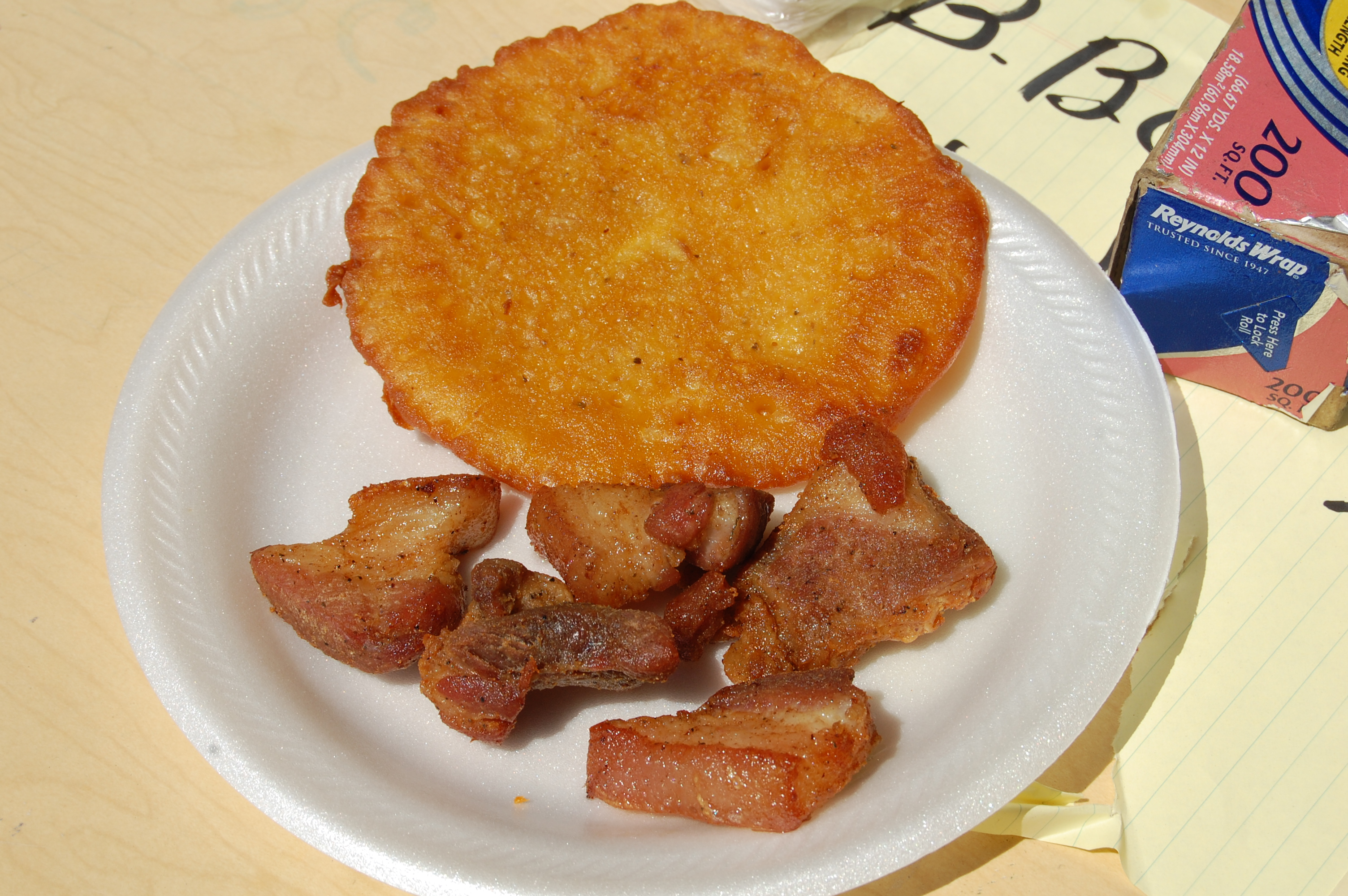
Bacalaíto and fried pork

A bacalaíto is a salted codfish fritter, a traditional Puerto Rican snack that typically is eaten with an entire meal. Bacalaítos are served at the beach, cuchifritos, and at festivals. They are crispy on the outside and dense and chewy in the inside.

== Description ==
In Puerto Rico, bacalaítos are served all over the island with many different versions. The salted cod is soaked in water overnight to remove most of the salt, or is boiled, usually three times. The cod is then drained and shredded into a large bowl with all-purpose flour, baking powder, sazón (spice mix), sofrito, and orégano brujo as the most common batter mix. The cod is then worked into the batter with water, then deep-fried; when done, the bacalaito should resemble a pancake.
