= Sorullos =

Puerto Rican fried cornmeal dish

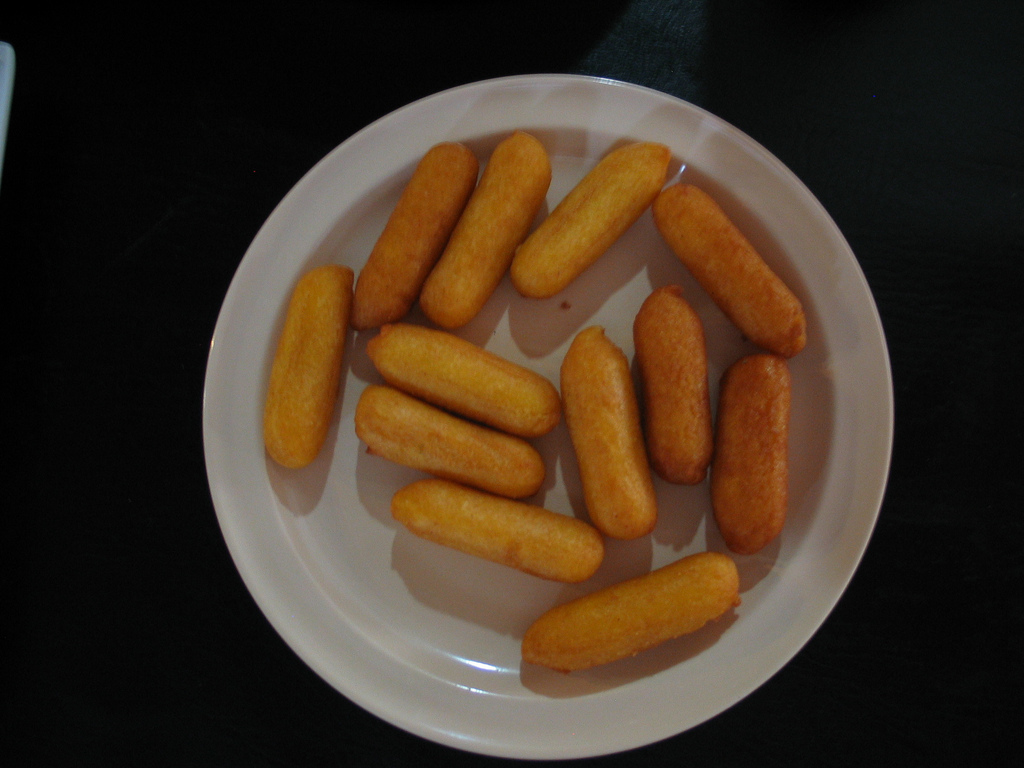
- A plate of sorullitos from Ponce, Puerto Rico
- Alternative names: Sorullitos, Sorullitos de maiz
- Type: Fritter
- Main ingredients: Cornmeal, water, salt, sugar
- Variations: Jamaican festival

Sorullos are a fried cornmeal-based dish that is a staple of Puerto Rican cuisine. Sorullos are served as a side dish or as appetizers (commonly known by the diminutive form sorullitos), and are sometimes stuffed with cheese. They can be served with mayoketchup or coffee, or dusted in confectioners' sugar.

== Description ==
Sorullos are made of a mix of steamed water, sugar, salt, and cornmeal, which is formed into sticks or logs and then fried. Alternatively, they can be shaped as disks, in which case they are called "tortitas de maíz" (corn fritters). The flavor is usually lightly sweet but can also be savory. Sorullos are best served hot, and the texture is crisp on the outside and dense and soft in the inside.

== Varieties ==
Sorullos can also be stuffed with cheese and lunch meat. Any melting cheese can be stuffed into sorullos but Edam cheese (known as queso de bola) is the most traditional. Manchego, parmesan, and montebello (a local cheese) can be grated into the corn dough.

There are also recipes containing bits of corn kernels, coconut milk (known as sorullos de coco), and green or yellow boiled mashed plantains added (sorullos de plátano).

Sorullos can also be stuffed with capers, olives, and sardines cooked in sofrito.

In certain regions of Puerto Rico, "tortitas de maíz" refers to a round variation of sorullos, often enriched with anise seeds. Meanwhile, in other parts of the island, these tortitas are akin to American pancakes but use cooked cornmeal and coconut flour instead of regular flour.

== Serving ==
In Puerto Rico, sorullitos are made in the shape of a short sausage and are called "sorullos" or the diminutive "sorullitos", for smaller sizes. Sugar is added to the cornmeal and can be stuffed with cheddar cheese or cream cheese with guava. They are served as an appetizer with entrees such as rice and beans, or as a breakfast to be served with coffee. They are served with fry sauce or guava dipping sauce.

== See also ==
- Puerto Rican cuisine
- Jamaican festival
- Hushpuppy
- Lumpiang keso
- Mozzarella sticks
- Tequeños
- List of maize dishes
- List of stuffed dishes
