= Cayeye =

Colombian dish

- Alternative names: Mote de guineo
- Course: Breakfast, dinner
- Place of origin: Colombia
- Region or state: Magdalena
- Main ingredients: Green guineos, butter, cheese, sofrito (optional)
- Other information: Popular in Magdalena

Cayeye is a Colombian cuisine dish made from mashed green guineos, a type of green banana. It is mainly eaten for breakfast. Cayeye is from the coastal region of Magdalena, Colombia including Ciénaga, Zona Bananera, Santa Marta, Fundación and Aracataca.

== Additional sources ==
- MORÓN, Carlos y GALVÁN, Cristina. La cocina criolla. Recetas de Córdoba y regiones de la costa Caribe. Domus Libri: 1996. p. 182.
