= CUNY Dominican Studies Institute =

CUNY institute researching and preserving Dominican heritage, culture, and history

Coordinates: 40.82000°N 73.94966°W

The CUNY Dominican Studies Institute (CUNY DSI) is an interdisciplinary research unit of the City University of New York devoted to the study of Dominicans in the United States and other parts of the world, including the Dominican Republic. The institute is housed at The City College of New York in Upper Manhattan, a campus bordered by the city's historic Washington Heights and Inwood neighborhoods, which are home to the largest concentration of Dominicans in the country. The current director of the institute is sociologist Ramona Hernández.

== Mission and goals ==
The missions of the CUNY Dominican Studies Institute are, generally, (1) To gather, produce, and disseminate academic knowledge, from interdisciplinary and comparative perspectives, on the experiences of people in the United States who trace their ancestry to the Dominican Republic; and (2) To advance research and teaching at the City University of New York, focusing on the Dominican population.

The Institute sponsors academic research projects in the areas of education, race, migration, language, literature, history, economics, women's issues, politics, youth, cultural identity, sports, performance and visual arts.

== History ==
The CUNY Dominican Studies Institute was founded in 1992 by the Council of Dominican Educators, community activists, and other academics from CUNY, to address the lack of reputable information on Dominicans available to students, scholars, and the community at large in the United States. It is the first university-based research institution in the United States focusing on the study of Dominican life outside of the Dominican Republic. CUNY DSI began as a pilot project in August 1992, with a development grant made available by CUNY's Chancellor. It was officially approved by the Board of Trustees at its February 22, 1994 meeting, and soon became an integral component of the City University of New York.

Since its inception, the institute has sponsored more than 80 conferences and symposia on diverse topics in various disciplines, bringing scholars at different stages of their careers to exchange knowledge and ideas on various aspects of the Dominican experience. The events are attended by audiences of students, faculty, and community residents. The Institute promotes a linkage between the academy and the community, and has encouraged the participation of members of the community in all its public events, allowing the latter to have the opportunity to participate in a dialogue that is usually reserved for academics.

Through its original research published in monographs, and its archives and library, the institute also works to increase the visibility of CUNY.

In 1997, Dr. Ramona Hernandez, speaking at Columbia University, pointed out the continuing demographic changes of the Dominican Americans, especially its increasing population and poverty. In 2007, for its 15th anniversary, the institute honored Oscar de la Renta.

== Dominican Studies Institute Library ==
The CUNY-DSI Library is a unique collection whose mission is to identify, collect, organize, and preserve documents on the Dominican experience in the United States. It is the largest collection on Dominicans in the United States. In its possession it has articles, newspaper clippings, master and doctoral dissertations, documentaries, audio-cassettes, conference papers and others on a variety of topics including culture, history, literature, politics, and sociology.

== See also ==
- African American studies
- Black studies
- Chicano studies
- Latino studies
- List of academic disciplines
- Native American studies
