= Green banana =

Unripe banana

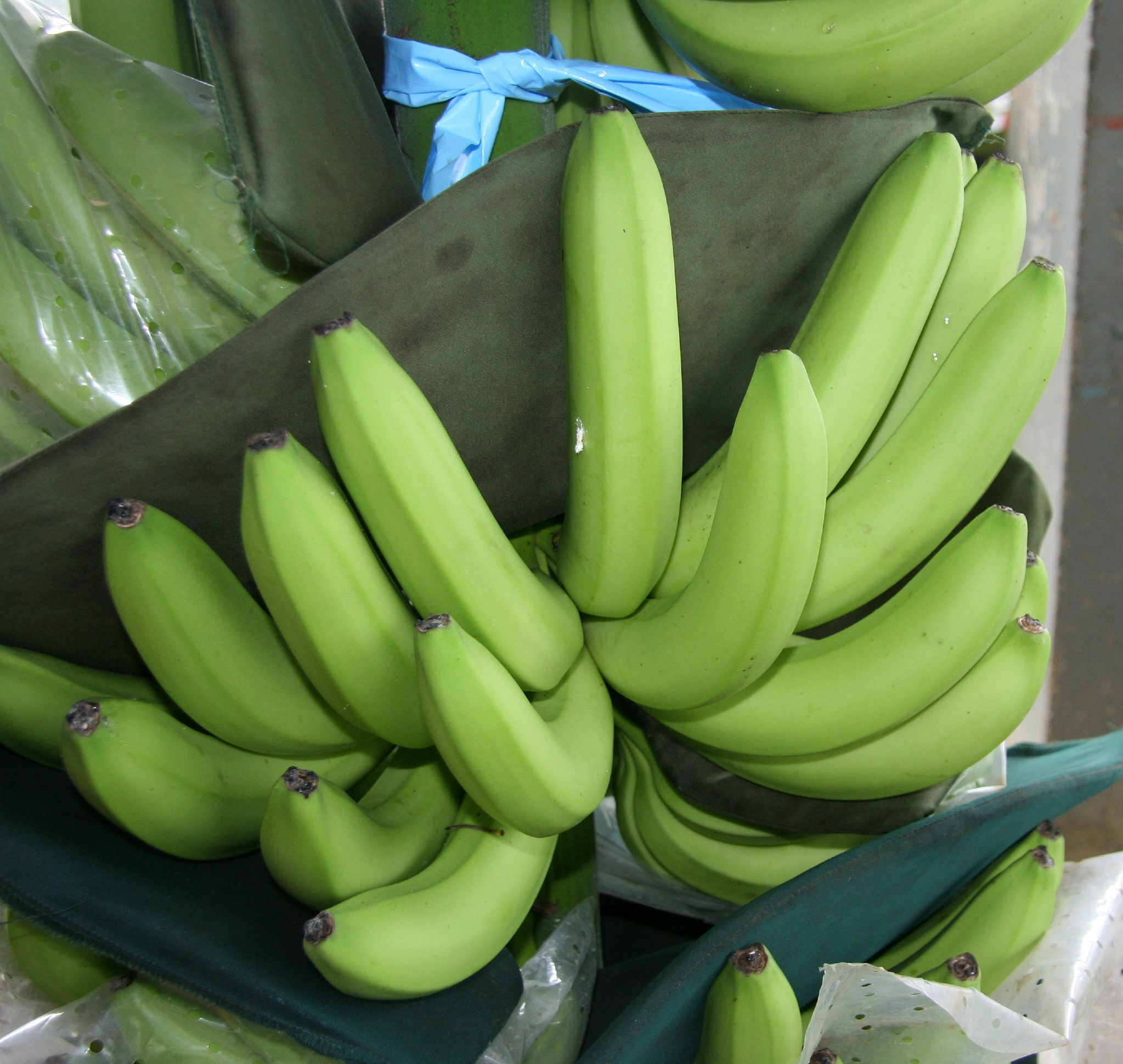
Green Bananas of Costa Rica

Green bananas are unripe bananas used in cuisines worldwide. They have a firmer texture and a starchy, mildly astringent taste compared to their ripe counterparts.

== Around the world ==
=== Africa ===
In East Africa, a starchy triploid banana cultivar originating from the African Great Lakes, known as "matoke," is harvested while still green and used in various dishes.

=== Caribbean ===
In certain Caribbean countries like Saint Lucia and Trinidad and Tobago, green bananas are called green figs. The term "green fig" is employed to distinguish unripe or green bananas from their ripe, yellow counterparts. In these regions, green figs are often featured in various dishes and are typically prepared differently than ripe bananas.

=== Latin America ===
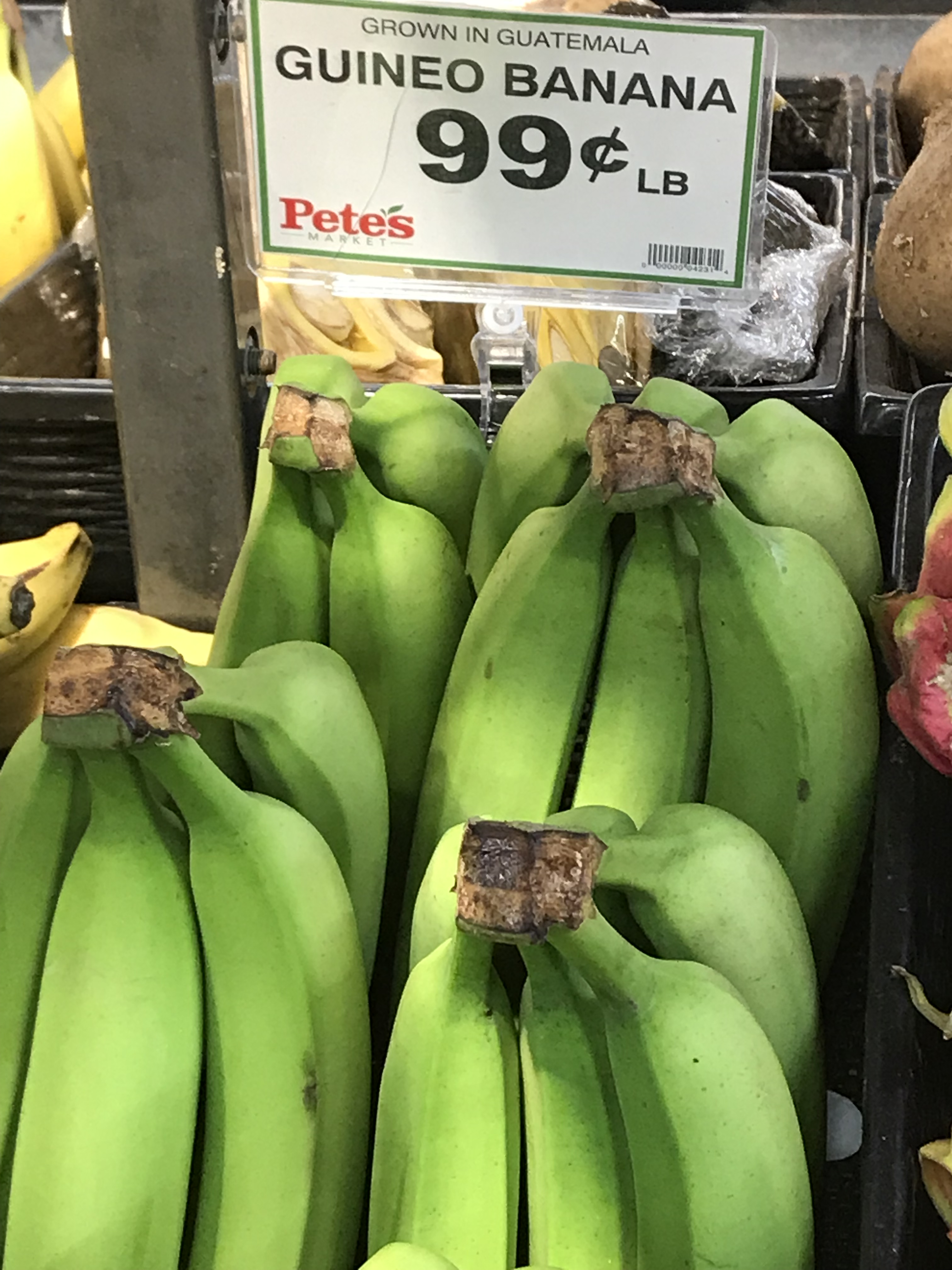
Guineo bananas for sale at a supermarket

Guineos (pronounced [ɡiˈneos]) usually refers to an unripe banana. The term guineo is sometimes used in reference to its ripened counterpart: the yellow (ripened) banana. The word guineo comes from Guinea, a country in West Africa, as it is one of the places from which bananas originate. Some make a distinction between the two and refer to green bananas as guineos verdes (green bananas) and yellow bananas as guineos (ripe bananas).

Guineos are not to be confused with plantains, which are far starchier than the guineo and cannot be used in the same ways.

Guineos are used widely in Latin American cooking as they are versatile, inexpensive, and filling.

==== Honduras ====
Bananas, whether green or ripe, are called guineos in Honduras. Guineos are a popular fruit in the country and are used for the popular dessert 'chocobanano', which is a frozen guineo covered in chocolate, sprinkles, or other toppings. Also used in soups and the famous tajadas. Which are fried green bananas.

==== Puerto Rico ====
In Puerto Rico, green bananas are used in dishes such as viandas con ajilimójili, pasteles, sopa de mondongo and sancocho. There are also many other dishes on the island which use green bananas. Green banana flour is widely available throughout Puerto Rico, used for making pancakes, crêpes, waffles, cookies, cakes, tortillas, bread, and other pastries.

- Alcapurrias – Classic fritters from Puerto Rico that have gained popularity through parts of Latin America, the Caribbean, and the United States. Green banana and yautía is considered the original alcapurria. In addition to a pinch of salt, the dough may also incorporate small amounts of squash, lard, annatto, and garlic. They are filled with meat of choice and fried. Most traditionally, filling is diced potato with picadillo, or seasoned corned beef.
- Bolitas de Guineo – Green banana dumpling are made all over the Caribbean. Dough is made from grated green bananas mixed with flour and salt. It is then set aside for a few hours or over night. The dough is then made into small balls and dropped into boiling a soup or broth.
- Escabeche – Green banana and chicken gizzards, pickled in a garlicky brine with bay leaves, garlic, olive oil, onions, and sliced or diced olives, among other ingredients.
- Dumpling de Guineo – These savory dumplings are made from grated green banana mixed with rice flour or tapioca starch, eggs, garlic, cilantro, and parsley. They are rolled into small balls and deep-fried. They can be prepared a day in advance. The dumplings are made for soups such as asopao de gandules (pigeon peas and dumpling soup), ajo de pollo y huevo (garlic chicken and egg soup), and sopa de guineos (green banana soup).
- Gandinga – A thick stew made with pork entrails as the main ingredient. Besides the pig's heart, kidneys, and liver, among other cuts/parts, this dish is prepared with ingredients such as manzanilla olives, sofrito, and capers. A classic plate serves gandinga with avocado and boiled green bananas on the side. The dish is important gastronomically in Afro-Puerto Rican culture, as historically, slaves were given limited food sources, usually consisting of rejected animal meats and parts, in addition to green bananas.
- Guineos Verdes en Fricasé – Green bananas cooked in a spicy, tomato-based fricassee sauce with recaíto, capers, chilies, and olives.
- Macabeos – Green bananas boiled and mashed with annatto oil and a small amount of uncooked green banana. They are then filled with the meat of choice, made into small balls, and deep-fried. This crescent-shaped banana fritter is found mainly in the town of Trujillo Alto, which celebrates a macabeo festival each year.
- Serenata de Bacalao – A warm ‘salad’ of green banana and salt cod (bacalao) with assorted seasonal tropical vegetables (such as cabbage, chayote, taro, yautía, yuca root, etc). The mixed vegetables are sliced, as well as the green bananas, and both are first sautéed with bell peppers, in plenty of olive oil, with vinegar added during cooking. The salted cod is shredded and mixed-in. The salad is then garnished with cilantro leaf, sliced boiled eggs, sliced avocado, and julienned onions.
