= Venezuelan cuisine =

Culinary traditions of Venezuela

Venezuelan cuisine is influenced by its European (Italian, Spanish, Portuguese, German, and French), West African, and indigenous traditions. Venezuelan cuisine varies greatly from one region to another. Food staples include corn, rice, plantains, yams, beans and several meats.

Potatoes, tomatoes, onions, eggplants, squashes, spinach and zucchini are also common side dishes in the Venezuelan diet. Ají dulce and papelón are found in most recipes. Worcestershire sauce is also used frequently in stews. Venezuela is also known for having a large variety of white cheese (queso blanco), usually named by geographical region. Italian settlers contributed pasta and meat products, while German settlers introduced Berliners (which are locally called bomba) and kuchens.

Venezuelans have three main meals: a large breakfast, a large dinner (around noon), and a very light supper in the evening. Venezuelan hospitality is widespread, so something to drink and eat is expected when visiting someone's home. In the 1960s, the development of industrial pre-cooked maize flower, starting with the popular brand Harina P.A.N. had major influence over the culinary culture in Venezuela. Most striking example are arepas, consisting of thick disks made of precooked cornmeal, either fried or baked. Large arepas, with a variety of fillings (ham and cheese is the most popular one), are eaten as snacks throughout the day; smaller arepas are typically served as side companions at all meals.

== Main dishes ==
Name	Image	Description
Arepa		Ground maize dough cooked, typically grilled on a budare (which is similar to a comal) or deep-fried in a regular pan. The arepa is served filled, similar to a sandwich. There are many fillings including shredded beef, black beans, Venezuelan cheese, ham, fish. Some fillings have proper names. Reina Pepiada (old Venezuelan Spanish for "curvy queen") is a filling for arepa composed of avocado, chicken, and mayonnaise. This particular filling is named after the Venezuelan beauty queen Susana Duijm.
Arepa andina		Same as arepas but made with wheat. Popular in the Venezuelan Andes region.
Asado negro		Slow-cooked beef roast in dark sugar-cane sauce.
Cachapa		A maize pancake, usually filled with fresh cheese and/or fried pork
Caraotas negras		Black beans, usually eaten at lunch time, with rice, plantains and shredded meat, or pabellón
Chicharrón		Typically fried pork rinds and eaten as a snack, or as a side dish
Chupe andino		A soup traditionally made with cheese, shredded chicken or hen, vegetables and cream.
Ensalada de pollo		Chicken salad, usually made with mayonnaise, green cabbage and carrots
Hallaca		A typical Christmas dish; hallacas typically have a mixture of beef, pork, chicken, capers, raisins, and olives wrapped in maize (cornmeal dough), bound with string within plantain leaves, and boiled or steamed afterwards
Humitas		Small tamales consumed throughout the Andes region of South America, including the Venezuelan Andes region
Huevos pericos		Scrambled eggs, butter, sautéed diced onions, and tomatoes; used often to fill an arepa
Hervido de gallina		Hen soup, usually with chunks of corn, potatoes, carrots and local root vegetables such as cassava, ñam, auyama (name for local variety of pumpkin), ocumo (cocoyam), and seasoned with onions, garlic, and cilantro
Mandoca		Deep-fried cornmeal ring
Mondongo		Soup made from diced tripe and slow cooked vegetables
Pabellón criollo		Creole pavilion, the national dish: white rice, shredded beef in stew, tajadas (fried ripe plantains) and stewed black beans
Pastel de chucho		An pie made from stingray and plantains
Polvorosa de pollo		Caracas version of chicken pot pie made with pâte sablée
Pasticho		Similar to the Greek dish pastitsio and the Italian lasagna
Polenta		Also known as "funche" in some areas of the country

== Typical snacks ==
Name	Image	Description
Tajadas		Fried ripe plantain slices
Tequeños		Deep-fried breaded cheese sticks
Tostones and patacones		Tostones are a common side dish for fried fish, typically eaten at the beach. They are also used to make the "Zulian patacón", which is a kind of sandwich made using tostones instead of bread
Empanadas		Served as snacks by street vendors; can also be eaten as a full meal. The dough is made with corn flour, similar to arepas, and the fillings are typically cheese, stewed black beans, and shredded beef, among others
Pastelitos		Fried puff pastries, famously a specialty of the Venezuelan Andes. These are made with wheat flour dough, and filled with, for example, cheese and chicken. Usually pastelitos are eaten at breakfast

== Bakery and breads ==
Name	Image	Description
Cachitos (de jamón)		Similar to French croissant filled with ham
Casabe		A flat bread made of bitter cassava
Pan dulce		Spanish for "sweet bread"
Pan de jamón		usually filled with ham, olives, and raisins and usually eaten during the Christmas season

== Beverages ==
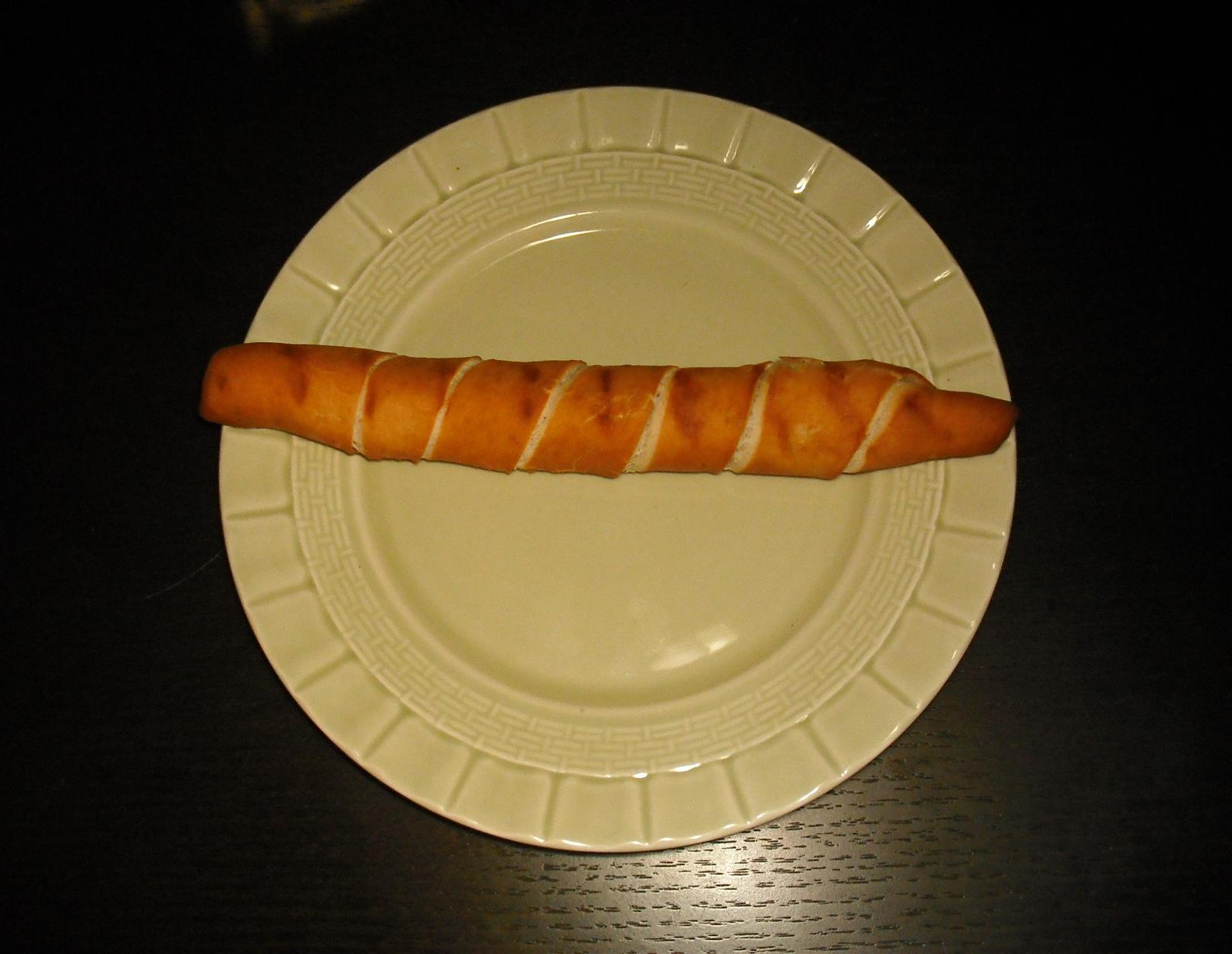
A tequeño is prepared with bread dough with queso blanco duro (hard white cheese) in the middle.

- Catara sauce – an alleged aphrodisiac based on juice of cassava
- Chicha – non-alcoholic drink, made of boiled white rice, milk and sugar
- Cocada – Coconut milkshake, found mostly in coastal areas
- Papaya juice
- Mango juice
- Passion fruit juice
- Malta – Non-alcoholic carbonated malt
- Papelón con limón
- Frescolita (strawberry-flavored soda)
- Chinotto (the counterpart to Sprite or Seven Up)
- Cocuy – Similar to Tequila. Served at celebrations.
- Guayoyo – Slightly watered down black coffee, commonly served after meals

=== Alcoholic ===
- Beer
- Ponche crema – Served especially during Christmas season
- Venezuelan rum

== Desserts ==
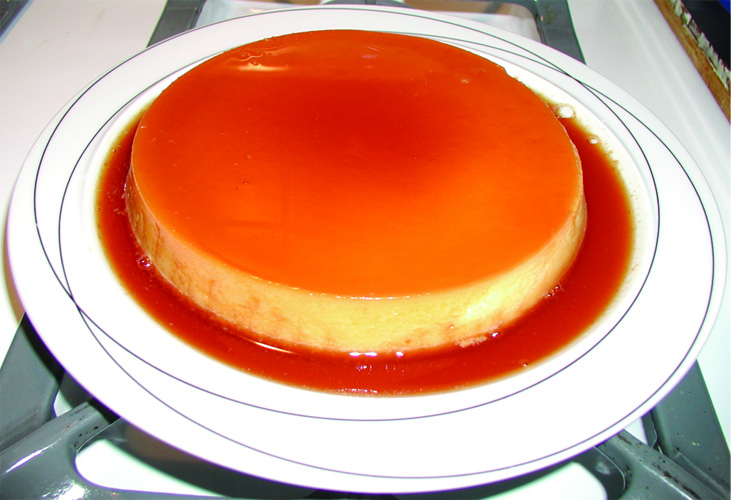
Venezuelan dessert called quesillo

- Alfajor – maize cookie with arequipe and grated coconut
- Bienmesabe - sweet Spanish dessert prepared with honey, egg yolk, and ground almonds as primary ingredients
- Brazo gitano (the Spanish Swiss roll)
- Conserva de guayaba – Guava confection
- Bomba - local version of Berliners
- Chupichupi – a water-based frozen snack in a plastic tube, a freezie
- Dulce de lechosa – Green papaya slowed cooked in a syrup flavored with cinnamon, cloves, and vanilla
- Cascos de guayaba
- Golfeado
- Kuchen
- Masamorra
- Majarete
- Mousse de chocolate
- Naiboa
- Negro en Camisa - Dark Chocolate Cake
- Pudín de chocolate – chocolate pudding
- Quesillo – local style caramel flan
- Papitas de leche - Traditional sweet treats or Milk Truffles
- Panelas de San Joaquin – biscuits twice baked recipe flavored with anis seed from San Joaquin, Carabobo State
- Polvorosas – butter cookies with cinnamon
- Paledonias – cookies with brown sugar also called cucas or catalinas

== Cheese ==
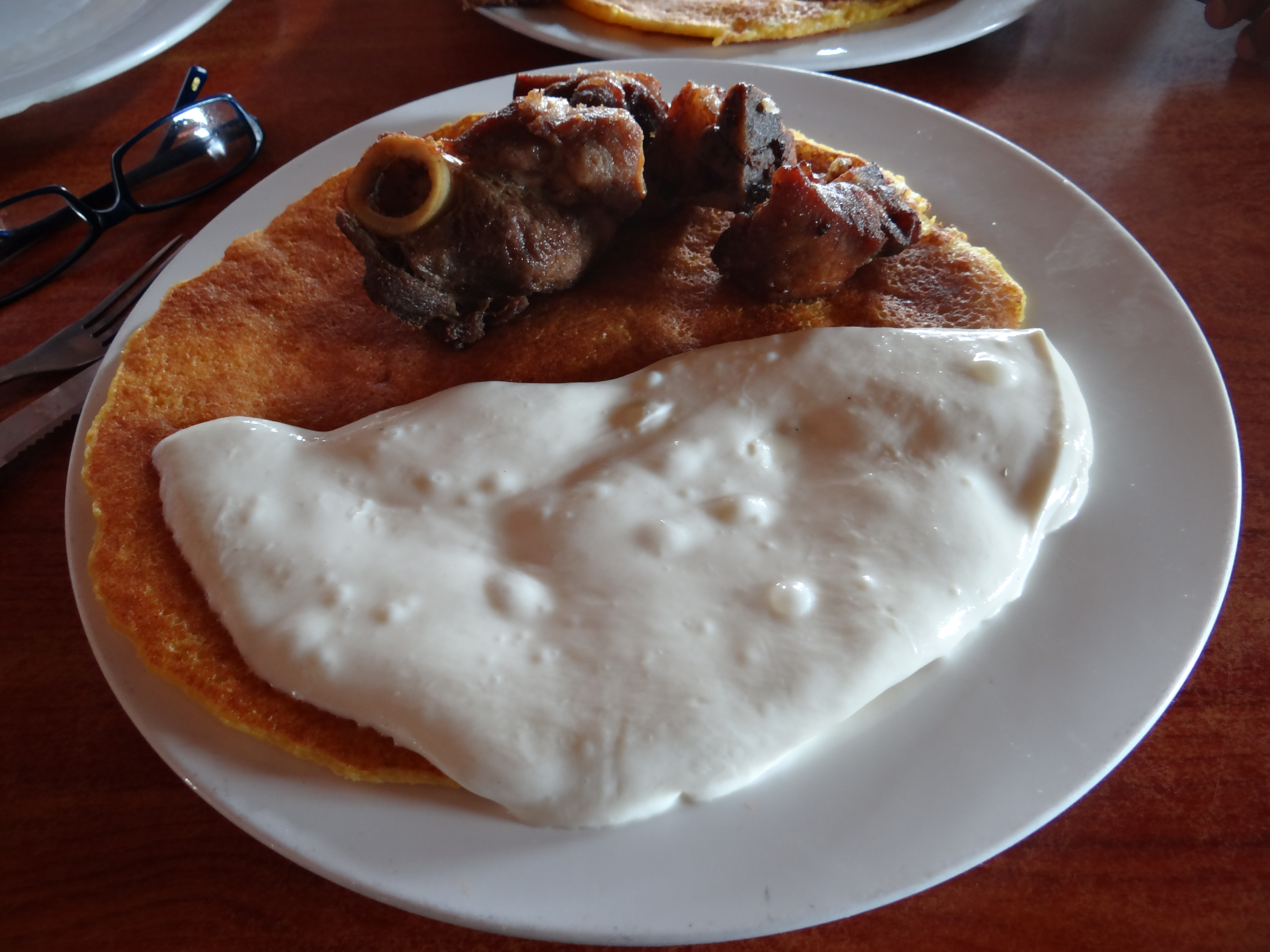
A cachapa with queso de mano

Queso blanco is a very common ingredient in Venezuelan cuisine. It is produced all over Venezuela with different flavors and textures. The name of each variety of cheese is usually related to the geographical region.

- Cuajada andina
- Guayanés cheese
- Llanero cheese
- Paisa cheese
- Palmita cheese
- Palmizulia cheese
- Queso blanco duro
- Queso crineja
- Queso de año
- Queso de mano
- Telita cheese

== See also ==
- Mi Cocina (book)
- Latin American cuisine
- South American cuisine
