= Corvina (disambiguation) =

Corvina is a wine grape variety.

Corvina may also refer to:

== Organizations ==
Corvina Kiadó is a Hungarian publishing house

== Fish ==
- Cilus gilberti, a marine fish of the family Sciaenidae, native to the Pacific coast of South America
- Cynoscion othonopterus, or Gulf corvina, native to the Gulf of California
- Cynoscion parvipinnis
- Cynoscion stolzmanni or yellowtail corvina, a species of fish of the genus Cynoscion
- Isopisthus parvipinnis, a species of fish native to the Atlantic and Caribbean from Brazil to Costa Rica
- Isopisthus remifer
- Larimichthys polyactis or the yellow corvina, another fish, native to the Pacific coast of Asia
