= Mandoca =

Venezuelan fried dough dessert

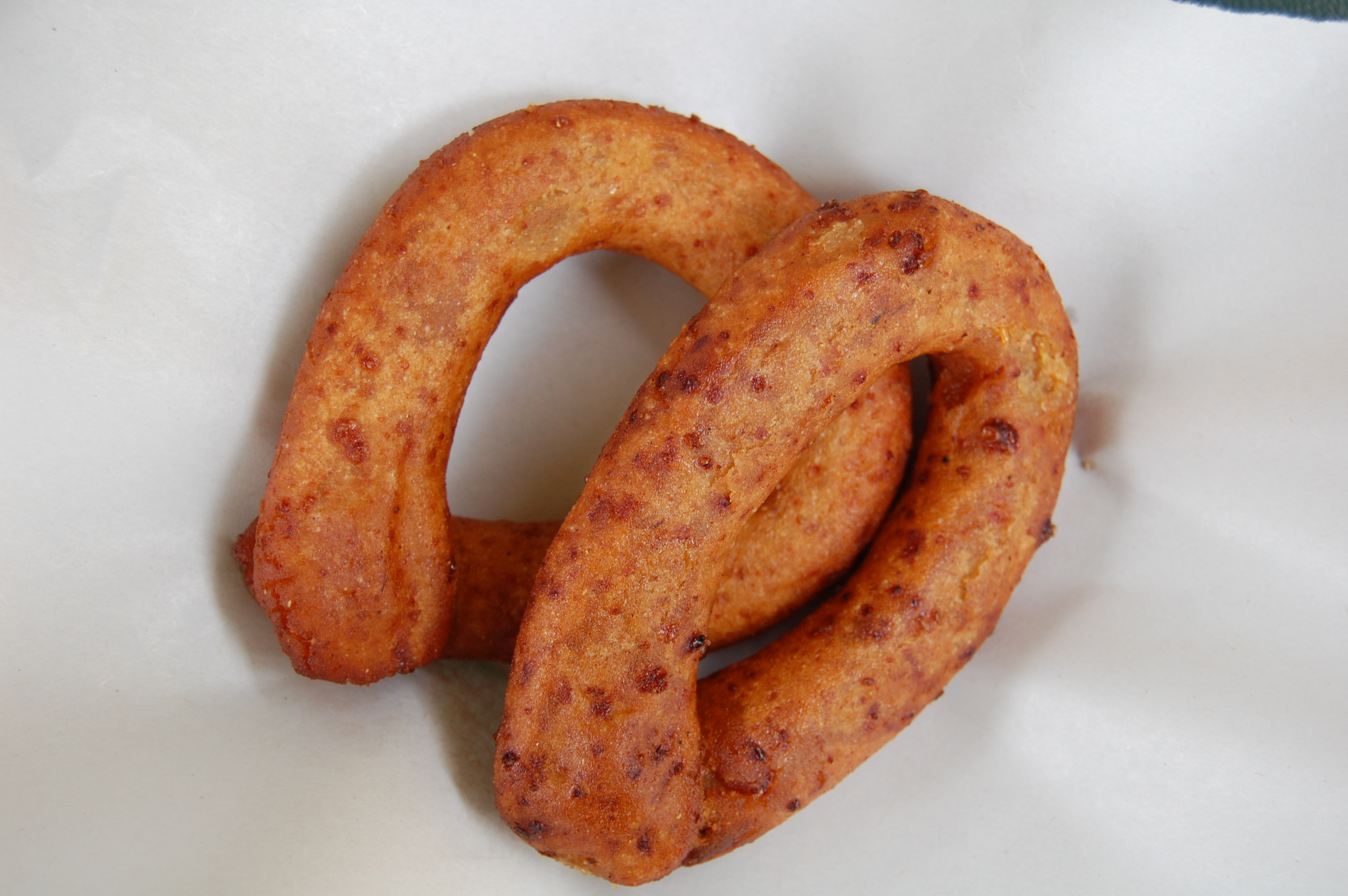
- Type: Bread
- Course: Breakfast
- Place of origin: Venezuela
- Region or state: Zulia and Falcón states
- Serving temperature: Hot
- Main ingredients: Cornmeal, plantains, grated cheese, sugar or papelón

A mandoca is a Venezuelan deep fried, ring-shaped food, made with a mix of plantains and cornmeal. It is usually served at breakfast, with butter, cheese and coffee, and it is most popular in the Venezuelan states of Zulia and Falcón. Mandocas are one of a variety of culinary specialties of Zulia.

Though their relevance has been shaded by the new transnational tendencies because its creation was not intended for massive consumption or for marketing, it remains a basic and important part of the culinary culture of Zulia. It is made of corn meal, water, salt, grated queso blanco (hard, salty, white cheese), sugar or panela and very ripe plantains.

== See also ==
- Aborrajados de plátano maduro
