= Pasteles =

Caribbean and Latin American dish

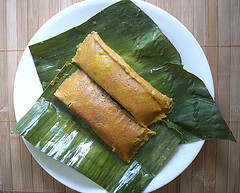
- Puerto Rican pasteles
- Type: Dumpling
- Region or state: Latin American and Caribbean countries

Pasteles (Spanish pronunciation: [pasˈteles]; Singular pastel), also pastelles in the English-speaking Caribbean, are a traditional dish in several Latin American and Caribbean countries. In Puerto Rico, the Dominican Republic, Venezuela, Panama, Trinidad and Tobago, and the Caribbean coast of Colombia, the dish looks like a tamal. In Hawaii, they are called pateles in a phonetic rendering of the Puerto Rican pronunciation of pasteles, as discussed below.

== Puerto Rican pasteles ==
Related to alcapurria, tamales, hallacas, and guanimes, pasteles were originally made by the indigenous people of Boriquen (Puerto Rico). Tainos made masa from cassava, yautía and squash. The masa was then filled with beans, fruit, chilies, corn, nuts, meat, fish and wrapped in corn husks.

An annual pastel festival (Festival Nacional del Pastel Puertorriqueño) exists on the island.

In Puerto Rico, pasteles are a cherished culinary recipe, especially around Christmas-time. The masa consists of typically grated green banana, green plantain, white yautía, potato, and tropical pumpkins known as calabazas. It is seasoned with liquid from the meat mixture, milk (this is optional), and annatto oil. The meat is prepared as a stew and usually contains any combination of Boston butt, ham, bacon, raisins, chickpeas, sliced pickled pimiento peppers, olives and capers, and is commonly seasoned with bay leaves, recaito, tomato sauce, adobo seco, and annatto oil, but the seasoning is not limited to these nor are root vegetables. Filling can range from vegetables, poultry, fish, sausage, and game meat.

Traditionally masa was flavored breadcrumbs, almonds were added to the filling and a chili would be tucked on one end of every pastel. The chili in most homes is eliminated and is replaced with ajilimójili, Pique sauce, or ketchup mixed with chili.

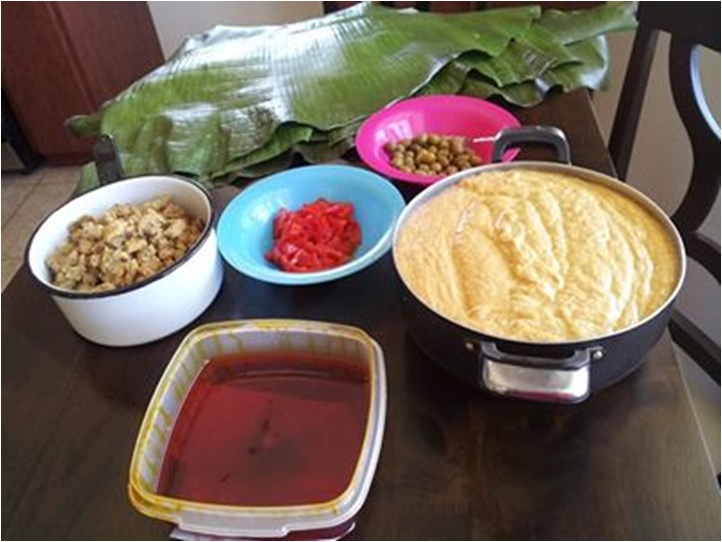
A typical set of ingredients used to make Puerto Rican pasteles (from top to bottom and left to right): banana leaves, olives, cubed pork, red peppers, the plantain-taro "masa" mix, and the achiote-oil mix

Assembling a typical pastel involves a large sheet of parchment paper, a strip of banana leaf that has been heated over an open flame to make it supple, and a little annatto oil on the leaf. The masa is then placed on banana leaf and stuffed with the meat mixture. The paper is then folded and tied with kitchen string to form packets. Some people use aluminum foil instead of parchment and string. Parchment paper is only applied if the pastel is boiled or steamed. Once made, pasteles can either be cooked in boiling water, steamed, barbecued (smoked or slow grilling), or frozen for later use. Because they are so labor-intensive, families often make anywhere from 50 to 200 or more at a time, especially around the holiday season.

Pasteles de yuca is one of many recipes in Puerto Rico that are popular around the island and in Latin America. The masa is made with cassava, other root vegetables, plantains, and squash. The recipe calls for cassava to replace the green bananas of the traditional pasteles de masa. Cassava is grated and squeezed through a cheesecloth removing most of its liquid. Broth, sometimes milk, annatto oil are added to the masa and is typically filled with shredded chicken and other ingredients.

According to Carmen Aboy Valldejuli, the original name for a Puerto Rican Pastel was Mamie. Although calling them mamies has lost use in recent generations it is still the official name in Carmen Aboy Valldejuli's book Cocina Criolla (the Puerto Rican "culinary bible").

Although the first recipes appear in a Dominican cookbook, pasteles were first written about in aguinaldo Puertorriqueño in 1843 about Puerto Rican Christmas traditions.

== Other regional variations ==
=== Colombia ===
Colombian pasteles are called pastel de arroz (rice pasteles) and are more of a tamale than a typical pastel. They are made from rice that is seasoned and left out in the sun; a process referred to as orear (to air). The rice is then mixed with many ingredients. Pickled vegetables, chorizo, pork, chickpeas, olives, and potatoes are the most common. Chicken and beef are also used. Colombian pasteles are wrapped twice, once with a cabbage leaf, and again with a banana leaf. This is the typical meal of the Nochebuena Dinner (Christmas Eve), in the Caribbean Coast Region of Colombia since their humble beginnings. It is often confused with the tamal from the Andean region, which is made with corn.

=== Dominican Republic ===
In the Dominican Republic pasteles are a Christmas tradition. The masa typically made from green plantains, and two root vegetables or squash and one root vegetable, sour orange, annatto oil and sometimes milk. They are filled with ground chicken or ground beef sautéed with garlic, cubanelle pepper, red onion, cilantro, tomato sauce, sour orange juice, and stick oregano and sometimes raisins. Masa is placed on a banana leaf, filled with meat and tied individually. They are then boiled in salt water or frazon for later consumption.

A Dominican cookbook in 1938 is the first to print recipes for pasteles. The cookbook printed two recipes, titled pasteles Puertorriqueño and pasteles Dominicano. The only difference is the inclusion of cassava in the recipe for Dominican pasteles which currently is not included. Today Dominicans call pasteles, pasteles de hoja and differ in taste and texture from Puerto Rican pasteles.

Some data indicates that at the beginning of the 20th century pasteles made its way from Puerto Rico to San Cristobal, Dominican Republic after the San Ciriaco hurricane in 1899 that devastated Puerto Rico. Many Puerto Rican workers fled to Hawaii and less known to Dominican Republic where pasteles became part of Hawaiian and Dominican culture among other Puerto Rican traditions. Puerto Rican pasteles still hold some popularity in the Dominican Republic.

=== Hawaii ===
The common name for this food in Hawaii, pateles, is most likely borrowed from Caribbean Spanish, which features weakening or loss of /s/ at the end of syllables: the pronunciation of pasteles as "pateles" occurs in Puerto Rican dialects, for instance. Over 5000 Puerto Ricans migrated to Hawaii at the dawn of the 20th century to work in sugar plantations. The singular of pasteles, pastel (often pronounced patel), has been constructed through back-formation. Other variations of this dish include pastele de olla y mistura or "pastele stew", pastele de olla, and pastel al horno.

=== Trinidad and Tobago ===
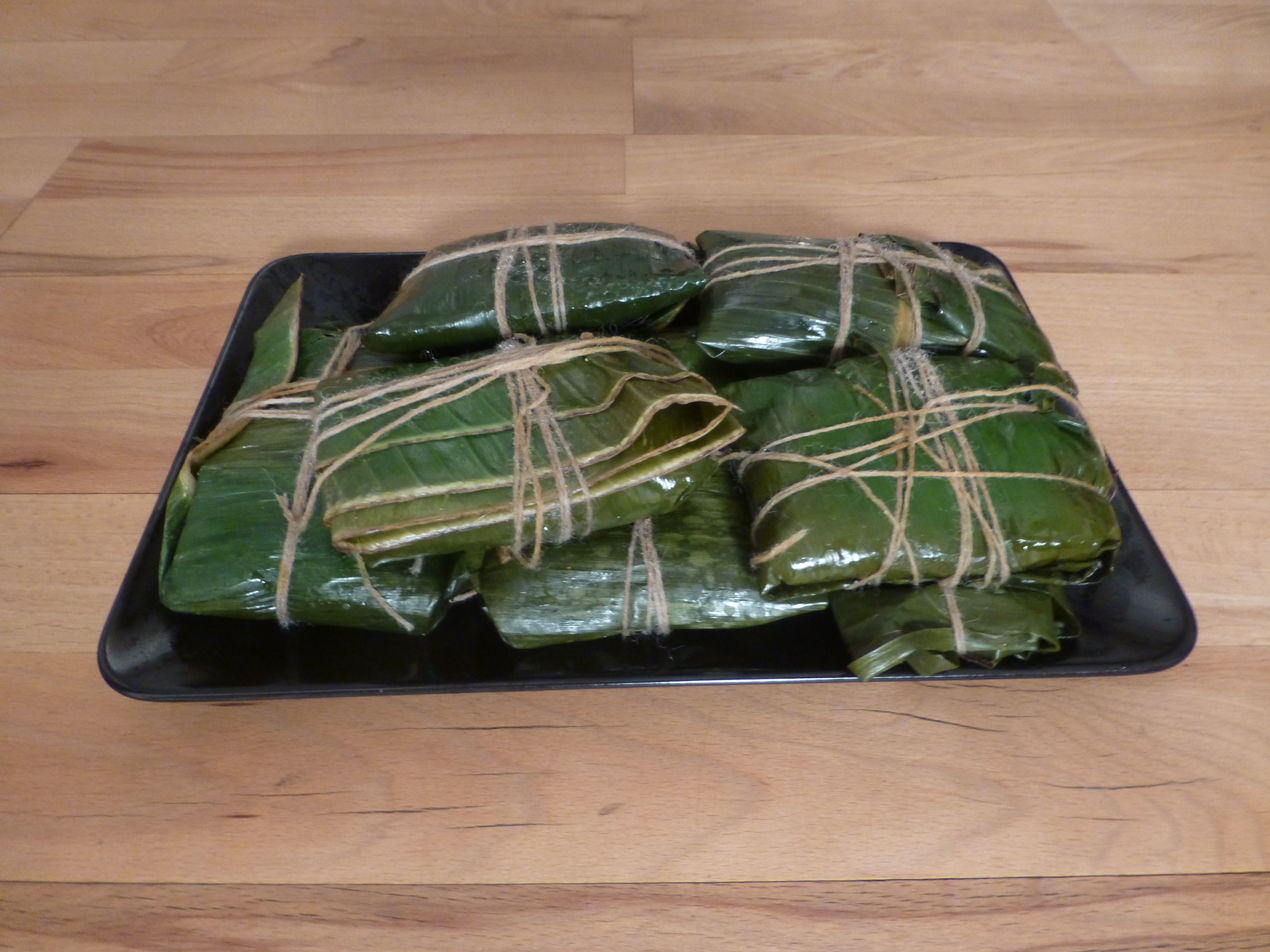
Pastelles (steamed)

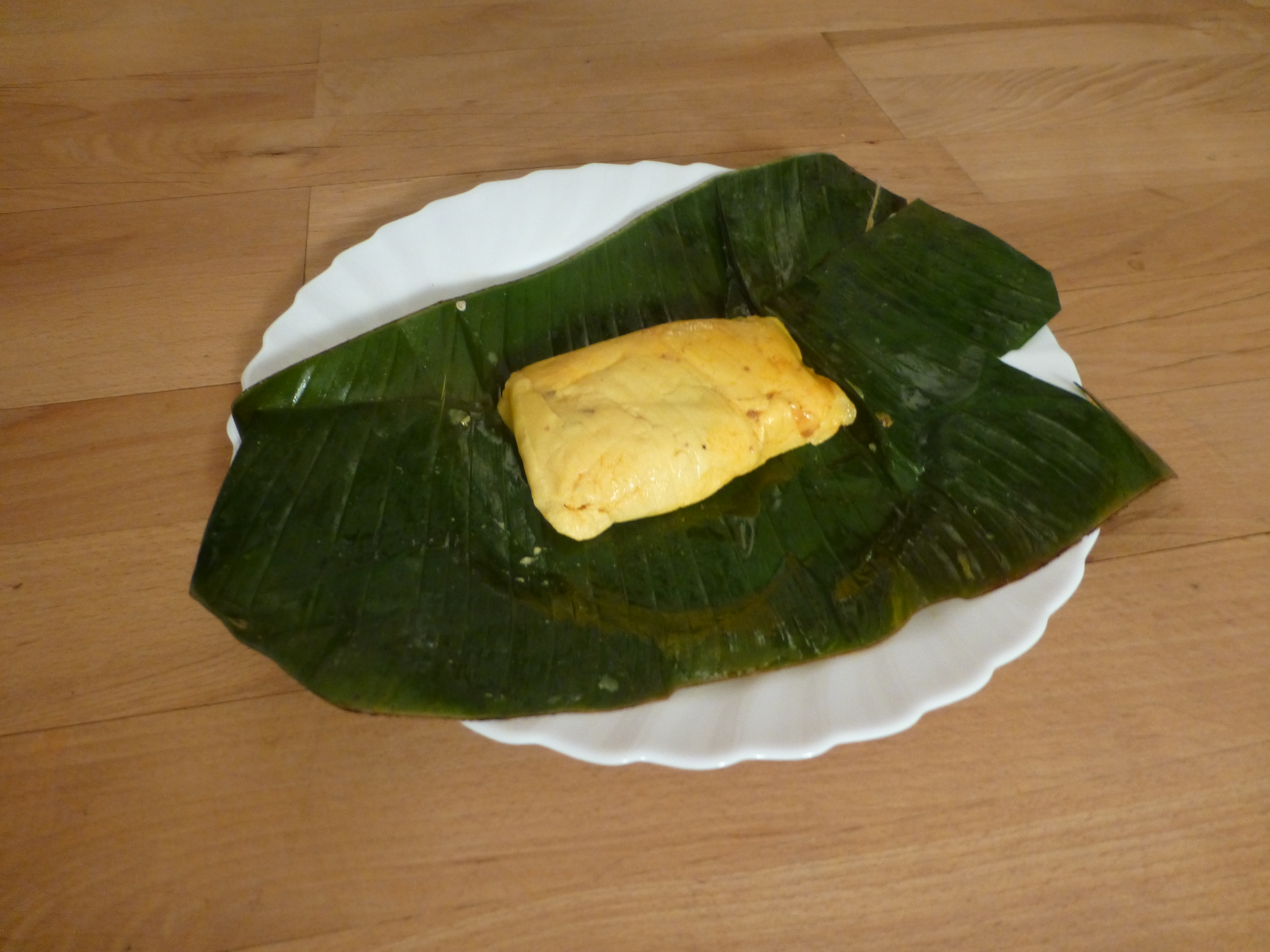
Pastelle (opened)

Trinidadian pastelles are small meat-filled cornmeal pies stuffed with meat, fish or vegetables seasoned with fresh herbs and flavored with raisins, olives and capers wrapped and steamed in a banana leaf. They are traditionally prepared and eaten during the Christmas season. It is believed that they were introduced by Spanish colonizers who ruled between the late 15th and early 18th centuries.

They exist in some form or another throughout Latin America and are more commonly known in Venezuela as hallacas (pronounced hayacas). The origins of pastelles are unclear. One view is that Spanish colonists who settled in the region made them as a substitute for one of their favorite dishes, empanada gallega. Empanadas gallegas and pastelles both have heavily spiced meaty fillings, but pastelles are made with cornmeal while the empanada is more like a typical pastry as it is made with white flour. Another view is that because the dish uses corn and is wrapped in banana leaves, it is a derivative of the Mesoamerican tamale.

A sweet version is called paime and is also a Christmas dish. It contains no filling, but the dough itself contains ground coconut and raisins.

== See also ==
- Conkies
- List of maize dishes
- List of stuffed dishes
