= Pique verde boricua =

Puerto Rican green hot sauce

Pique verde boricua

Pique verde boricua is a Puerto Rican hot sauce.

== Preparation ==
Pique verde is made from roasting ají caballero chilies, cubanelle peppers, garlic, onions, and blended with fresh parsley, cilantro, culantro, olive oil, and lime juice.

This sauce may be served with meats, fish, tostones, viandas (root vegetables), mofongo or rice and beans.

== See also ==
- Ajilimójili
- Mojo
