= Cachito =

Type of bread from Venezuela

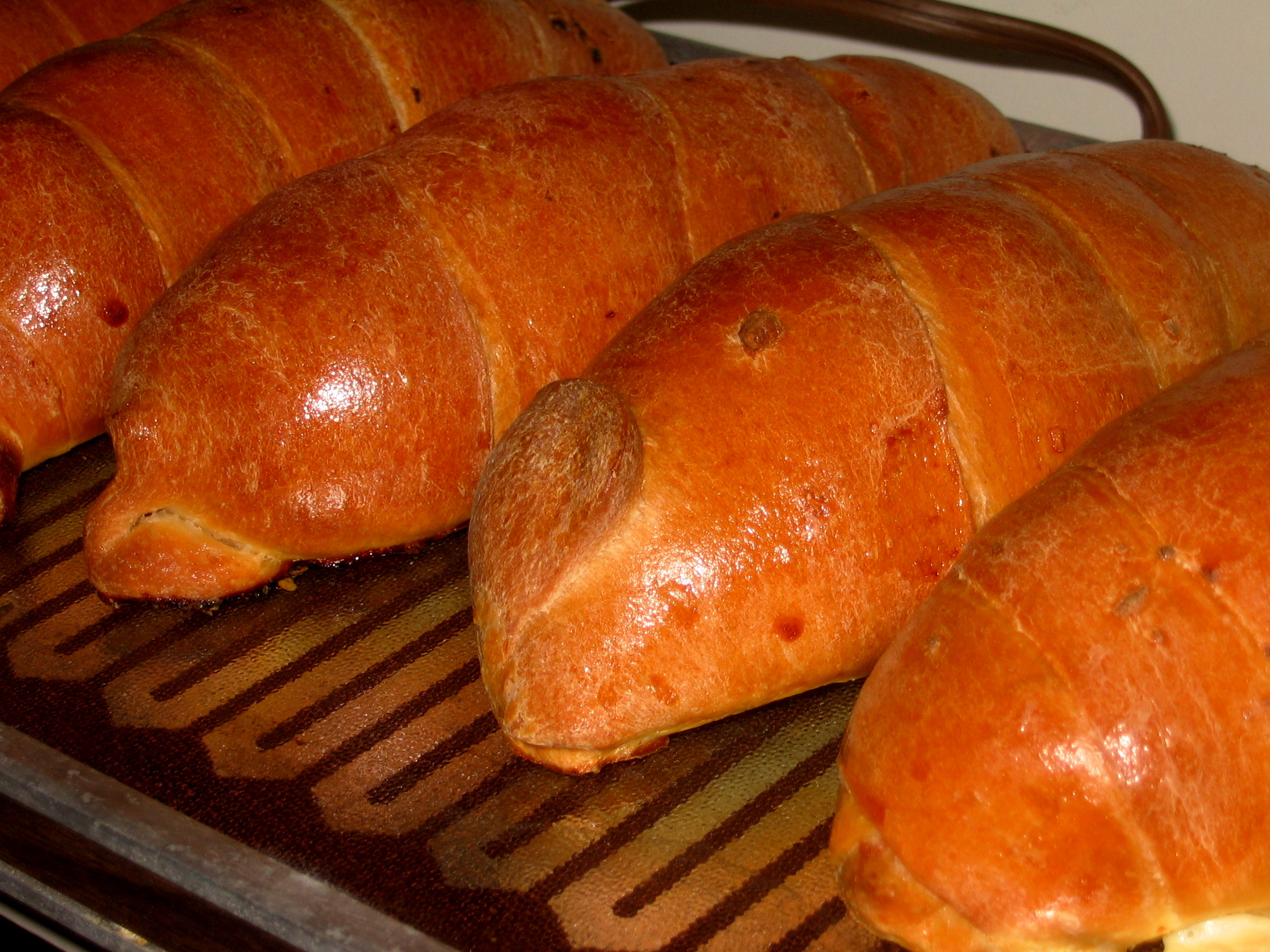
Cachitos

The cachito, also known as cachito de jamón, is a Venezuelan pastry similar to the croissant that is often filled with ham and cheese.

The ingredients vary depending on the state and the bakery they are made from but the most common ingredients are wheat flour, butter, eggs, room temperature milk, water, salt, yeast and a pinch of sugar.

The origin of the cachito is unconfirmed. Some associate it with the arrival of Portuguese and Italian bakers in the early twentieth century, while others believe that it came to existence in the kitchen of an Italian baker named Pietroluchi Pancaldi in Lusiteña, Caracas, in 1940. Others believe Cachitos is a derivate of the Venezuelan Christmas dish, pan de jamón.

Cachitos are a staple in Venezuelan cuisine. Normally, they are eaten during breakfast hours, but they are also known to be eaten throughout the day. In Venezuela, some bakeries have made sure that the scent of fresh Cachitos are in the air by the time the country wakes up, but outside of the country it is hard to find such delicacies from the local bakery. They are usually accompanied by natural juices, coffee or Malta.

== See also ==
- Venezuelan cuisine
