= Tajada =

Dish of sliced fried bananas

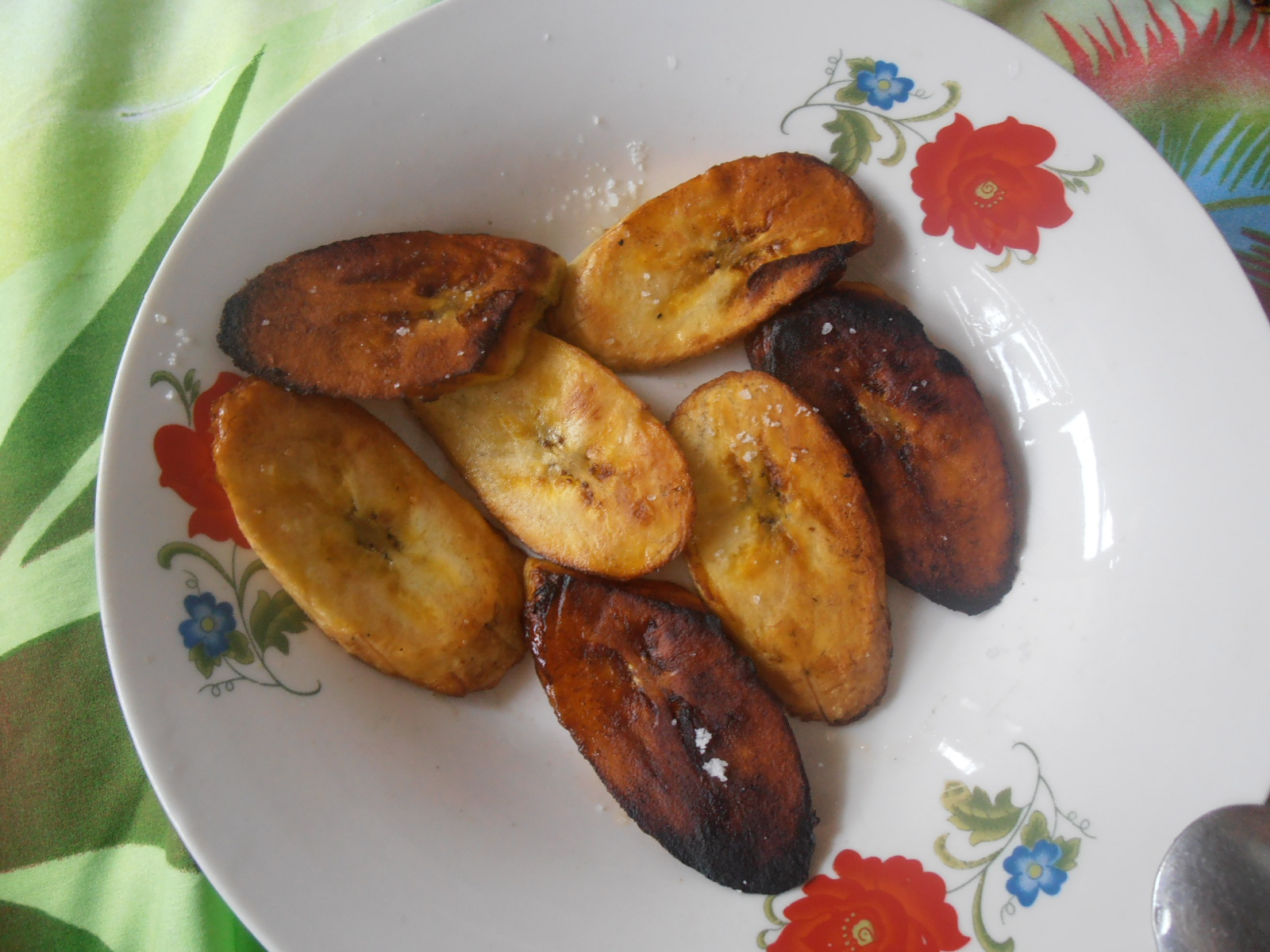
Tajadas

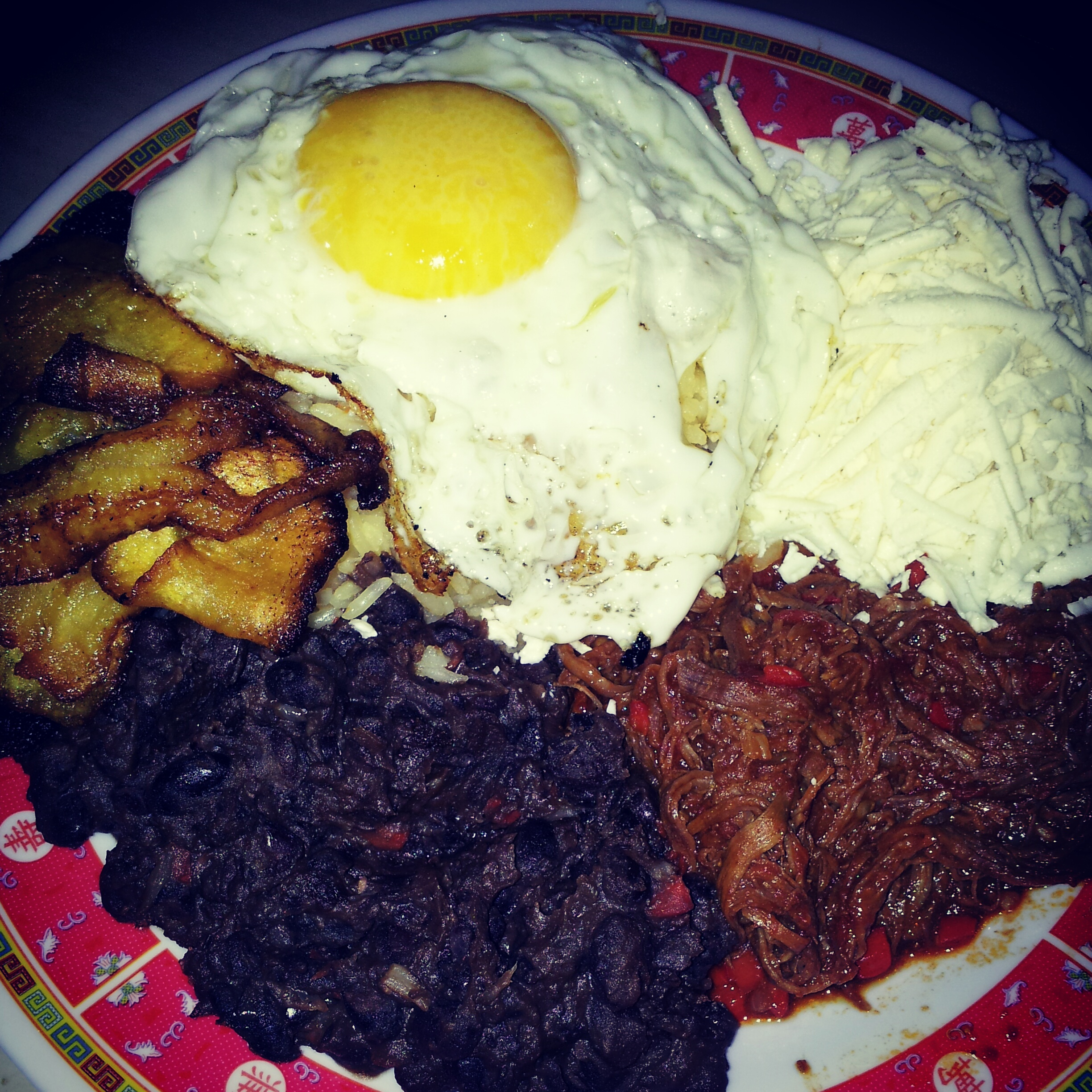
Venezuelan cuisine Pabellon criollo with caraotas fritas, tajadas, cheese, and rice with a fried egg on top.

Tajada "slices" is a dish of fried plantains that are sliced long. It is a typical food of Caribbean countries as well as Nicaragua, Colombia, Honduras, Panama, and Venezuela. It is sometimes served with grated cheese.

== See also ==
- Aborrajado
- Chifle
- Fried plantain
- Mofongo
- Patacón
- Tostones
