= Jibarito =

Green plantain sandwich

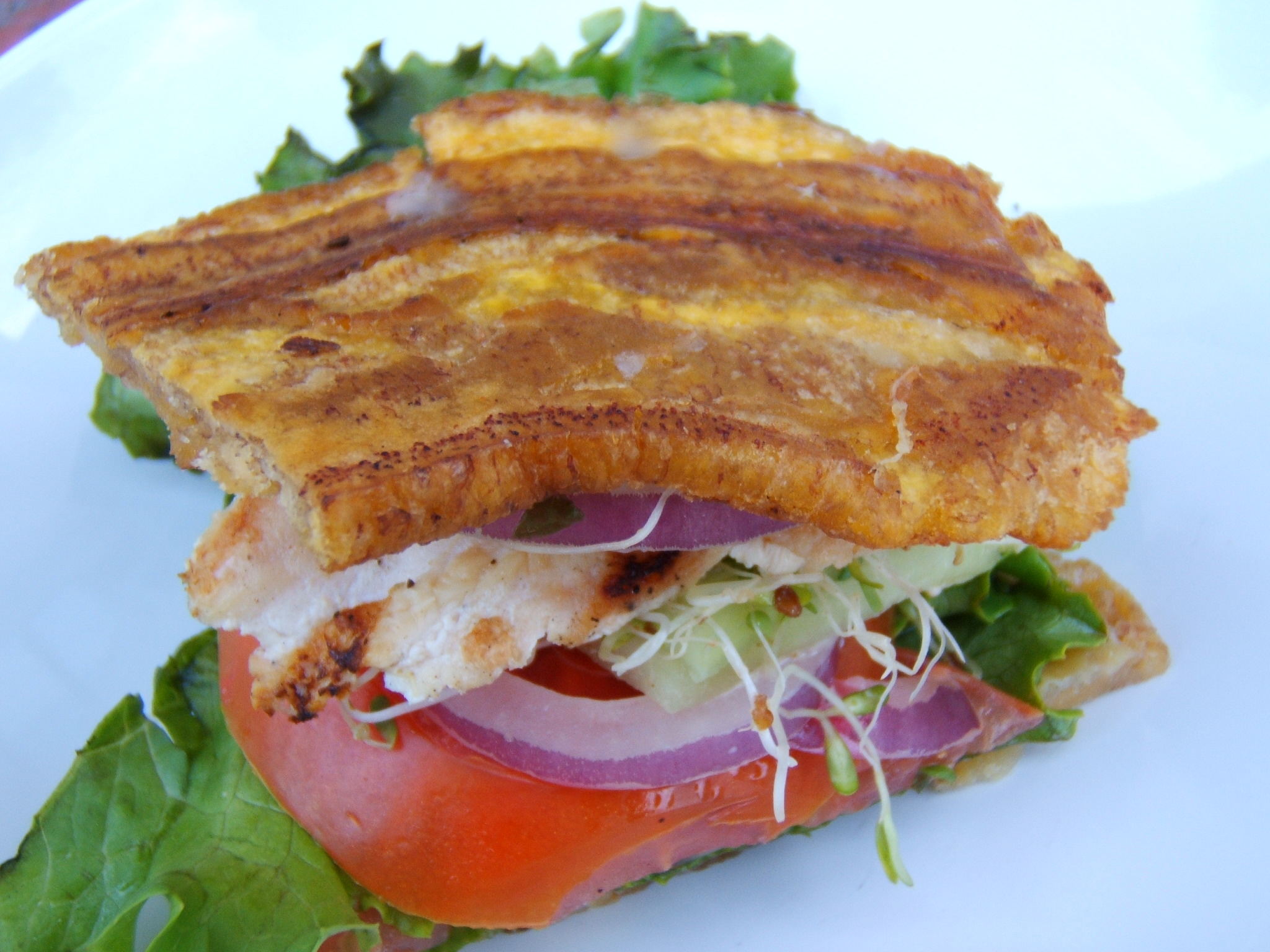
- A jibarito made with grilled chicken
- Type: Sandwich
- Place of origin: Venezuela and Aguada, Puerto Rico and Chicago, Illinois
- Main ingredients: Plantains, garlic-flavored mayonnaise, meat, cheese, lettuce, tomatoes

The jibarito (Spanish: [xiβaˈɾito]) is a sandwich originating from Chicago’s Puerto Rican community. It is made with flattened, fried green plantains instead of bread, aioli, and a filling consisting of meat, cheese (generally American), lettuce, tomato, and sometimes onion and crushed garlic. The original jibarito had a steak filling, and that remains the predominant variety, but other ingredients, such as chicken and pork, are also common.

== History ==
Chicago restaurateur Juan "Peter" Figueroa introduced the jibarito at Borinquen Restaurant, a Puerto Rican restaurant in the Humboldt Park neighborhood, in 1996. The twice-fried plantain chip used as the base of the sandwich is inspired by Venezuelan patacones, also known in Puerto Rico as tostones. The name is a diminutive of jíbaro and means "little yokel".

The sandwich's popularity soon spread to other Latin American restaurants around Chicago, including Mexican, Cuban and Argentinian establishments, and jibaritos now can be found in some mainstream restaurants as well.

== Related sandwiches ==
Other Latin American sandwiches served on fried plantains predate the jibarito. They include a Venezuelan specialty called a patacones and a 1991 invention by Jorge Muñoz and Coquí Feliciano served at their restaurant, Plátano Loco, in Aguada, Puerto Rico.

== Reception ==
The Daily Meal included the jibarito in their article "12 Life-Changing Sandwiches You've Never Heard Of". Time Out called the jibarito an "ingenious creation", while National Geographic listed it as one of Chicago's most iconic dishes.

== See also ==
- Culture of Chicago
- Culture of Puerto Rico
- List of sandwiches
