= Pastel de chucho =

South American delicacy

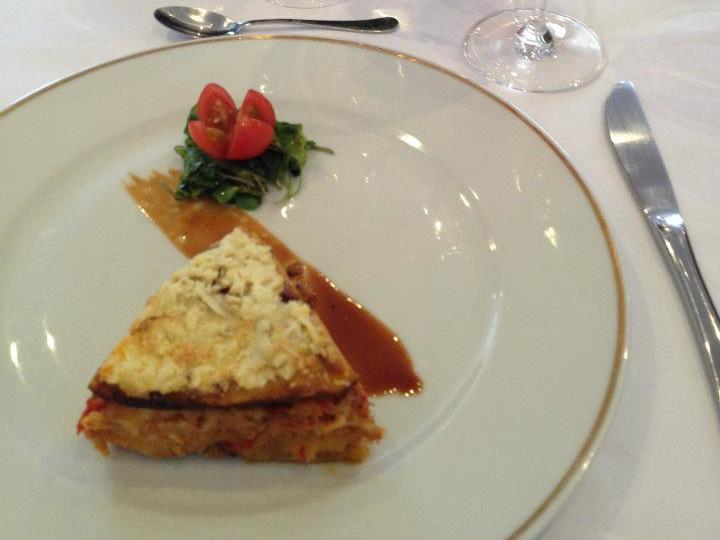
A slice of Pastel de chucho

Pastel de chucho (English: Stingray pie; see "chucho") is a delicacy made of stingrays, common in Eastern Venezuela and Margarita. The creole dish is described as "gourmet".

The dish is traditional food in the South American country of Venezuela, and a very common dish in Eastern coastal areas. Its popularity may be attributed to how it is both sweet and salty, its famous gourmet flavoring. The pie looks, and is constructed, like a lasagna.

== Preparation ==
The pie is made from stingray/manta ray and plantains. However, in areas where it isn't easy to find rays, Venezuelans will use a different kind of flat fish to create the dish, like dogfish or small sharks (like the Mexican pan de cazón). The dish often also contains various vegetables and spices, cheese, and molasses.

The ray or fish is shredded to make the pie, giving it a distinct texture. The ingredients are fried to make the pie.

== History ==
Though having a strong local tradition and identity, the dish has only been in existence since the 1980s. Also, whilst common all year round it is typically an Easter or Lent meal.

A chef famous for making the dish is Rubén Santiago.

In 2011 a short animated film was released, called Hoy no se hace pastel de chucho (English: No Stingray Pie for Dinner Tonight). The film focuses on an ecological message encouraging the people of Margarita and Nueva Esparta to stop hunting stingrays for food.

There are usually stingray pies at the Margarita Gastronomy Festival, and in 2013 the festival organised an attempt to cook the largest ever pie; this was denounced by environmentalist groups.

== See also ==
- Stingray as food
- Pan de cazón
