= No Stingray Pie for Dinner Tonight =

- Spanish: Hoy no se hace pastel de chucho
- Directed by: Braulio Rodríguez
- Written by: Rodríguez, Guillermo Paz
- Produced by: Hekura Films; Chaguaramo; 20th Century Fox Venezuela
- Starring: Luis Carreño
- Music by: Alonso Toro
- Release dates: May 2011 (France); 5 August 2011 (Venezuela)
- Running time: 5 minutes
- Country: Venezuela
- Languages: Spanish; Venezuelan Caribbean Creole

No Stingray Pie for Dinner Tonight, also known by its Spanish title Hoy no se hace pastel de chucho, is a 2011 Venezuelan short animated comedy film, that also tackles the environment and ocean pollution. The film is set around Margarita Island.

== Synopsis ==
Chucho is a stingray, searching for something to eat, but he only comes across rotten sea snails. Félix, a fisherman, is catching these snails when his line gets caught — he dives into the water to cut himself loose, then sees Chucho caught up; he imagines the stingray as his own meal and brings him on board. Waking up on the boat, Chucho spots a healthy snail and steals it, diving into the sea. Felix gives chase and the two get to explore the sea life, until a mountain of trash falls on them. Felix struggles back to the surface as Chucho gives the snail to his children. Felix tries fishing again, turning up garbage. A party boat called "Fast and Furious" sails past, blasting music and dumping their rubbish in the sea.

== Production ==
The 5-minute film took a year to produce. Rodríguez described the animation process "complex", saying the reason why the film is only a short is to keep it a quality product while working within those constraints. He has also suggested it allows the production company the possibility of short sequels. The film intends to encourage its viewers to help the ecology, particularly of Nueva Esparta state, where human activities can damage the environment.

The film score was designed to "give a magical connection" to the indigenous music of the Margarita/Eastern Venezuela region.

The fisherman Felix is voiced by Luis Carreño, the voice actor who plays SpongeBob SquarePants in Latin America.

== Release ==
Rodriguez gives an interview about the film

The film was an official selection at the Short Films Corner of the Cannes Film Festival in May 2011.

The film was co-produced with 20th Century Fox. It began showing in Venezuelan cinemas in August 2011, as an animated special shown before the Fox film X-Men: First Class. In December 2016, it began screening as VOD through the media channels of the Venezuelan El Estímulo.

In January 2013, it was in the catalogue of the first films to be shown at the San Cristobal Cinematheque Hall for its opening; all the films were animated, with the event mostly attended by children, because the hall contains a film library and resources with the aim to promote cinema to new generations.

It was still on the festival circuit in 2016, being shown at the 11th Santo Domingo International Children's Film Festival.

== Response ==
The film has been described as "one of the first Venezuelan films to touch on the topic of ecology".

At the 2011 Margarita Latin American and Caribbean Film Festival, the film won the award for Best Short or Medium Length National Fiction film, awarded by the Venezuelan Association of Film Exhibitors.

In 2013, the Margarita Gastronomy Festival itinerary included an event attempting to make the world's biggest Stingray Pie, a delicacy of the region; this alerted environmentalist groups, who wrote that the film had warned of such a situation threatening the sustainability and should have been learned from.
