= Hallaca =

Dish from Venezuela

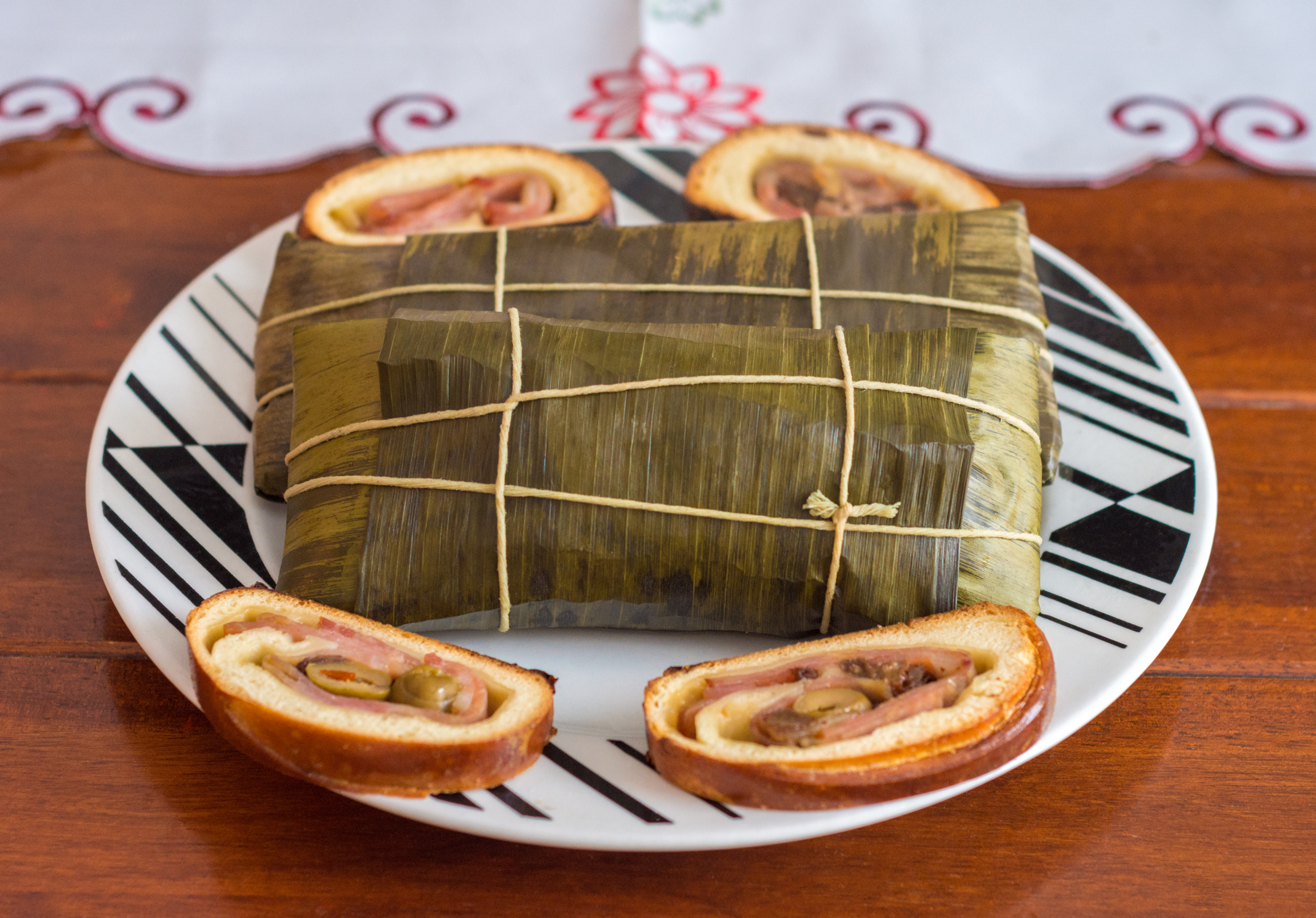
- Hallaca and pan de jamón
- Alternative names: Ayaca, hayaca, guanimo, tamal, guanime
- Region or state: Venezuela
- Main ingredients: cornmeal dough or cassava dough, meat (beef, pork, chicken), raisins, capers, olives
- Variations: Pasteles, alcapurrias

Hallaca (Spanish pronunciation: [aˈʎaka], [aˈʝaka]) is a traditional South American dish. Its origin is indigenous, but raisins, capers, olives, and sometimes bits of bacon were added in the 16th Century and after by settlers from the Iberian Peninsula. Hallaca consists of corn dough stuffed with a stew of beef, pork, or chicken and other ingredients such as raisins, capers, and olives, fresh onion rings, red and green bell pepper slices. There are vegetarian hallacas, made with black beans or tofu. Hallacas are folded in plantain leaves, tied with strings, and boiled. The dish is traditionally served during the Christmas season and has several regional variants. It has been described as a national dish of Venezuela. Some speculate it originated from the Orinoquia. Characteristic of the hallaca is the delicate corn dough made with consommé or broth, and lard colored with annatto. Hallacas are also commonly eaten in eastern Cuba, Trinidad where it is called pastelle, and parts of Colombia, Ecuador, Aruba, and Curaçao.

== Origins ==
The Hallaca is a traditional South American food known by various names and spread throughout the Spanish Empire in the Americas as far south as Argentina in the decades following the conquest. It is said to have been invented by slaves during the colonial era. The slaves would prepare the Christmas Eve meal for the landowners and with leftover meat they made the hallacas filling for their own Christmas meal. One version of the dish's origin tale has it that the daughter of the landowning family asked to taste the hallacas. She and her family liked the dish so much they requested for it to be made for their dinner party and ever since it has been part of the traditional holiday meal for all classes.

== Name ==
According to Adolfo Ernst, the word hallaca evolved from the indigenous arawak, stemming from the verb ayua or ayuar, meaning "to mix or blend". From there, the construction ayuaca (mixed things) devolved to ayaca and ultimately to hayaca or hallaca (using Spanish silent "h" when written). Another version presumes that the word comes from an aboriginal language of the West of the country, whose meaning is "wrapping" or "bojote". The earliest use of the word in the modern sense is in a 1781 document of Italian missionary linguist Filippo Salvatore Gilii.

== Preparation ==
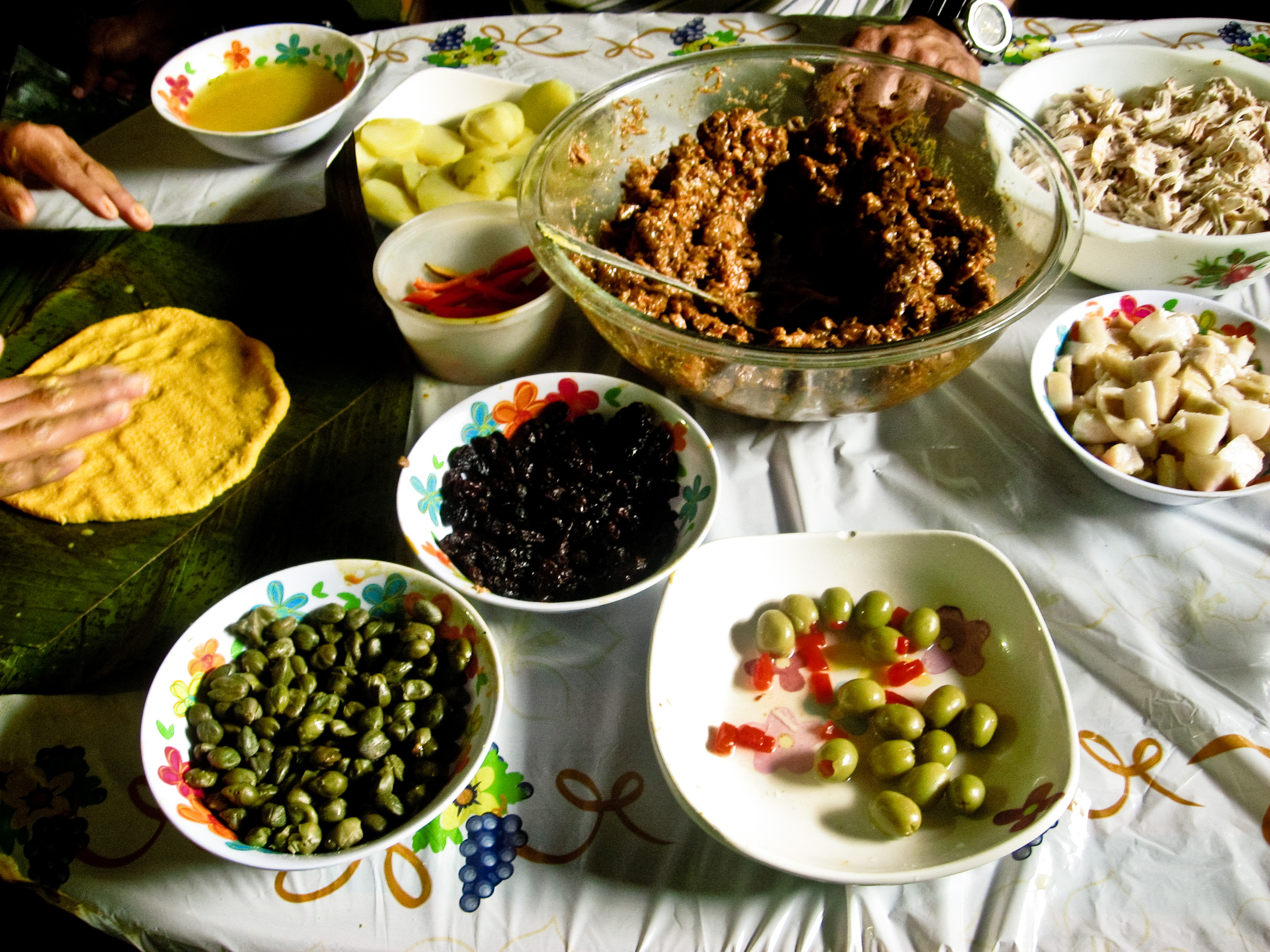
Filling of the hallacas before being wrapped in the plantain leaves

Hallaca has an elaborate filling. Ingredients differ between regions and families but may include a combination of beef, pork, bacon, lard, onion, sweet pepper, red pepper, scallion, garlic, salt, pepper, oregano, cumin and some type of cooking wine or vinegar. Some versions of the filling include leeks, Worcestershire sauce, mustard pickles, panela, or dark brown sugar. The stew is simmered over low heat slowly for several hours. The version from the Venezuelan Andes however differs because its meat filling is a guiso crudo, which means it is not pre-cooked.

In Aruba and Curaçao, two islands just off the coast of Falcón state, Venezuela, it is called 'ayaca' or 'ayaka'. The ingredients are pork and chicken stew, or pork or chicken stew, capers, raisins, cashew nuts, bellpepper, pickled baby onions, prunes, and olives. The dough is made from white cornmeal, and the ayaca leaves first spread with lard or oil. Cooked meat and other ingredients are then wrapped in ayaca leaves, tied with string and then boiled for about two hours. Flavors in the ayaca vary from family to family, and some add very hot Madam Jeanette peppers.

In Puerto Rican cuisine the dish is called hayaca and used to be a popular part of the island's cuisine. Unlike the Venezuelan variety, hayacas from Puerto Rico are made not with maize but with cassava, stock, milk, pork fat cooked with annatto, and banana leaf, and baked in traditional open-wood-fire. They are typically filled with diced pork butt braised with sofrito, annatto oil (olive oil or lard), olives, capers, chickpeas, raisins, and spices. The liquid is then strained into the masa. Because of the long and elaborate process and skills that it takes to prepare, the hayaca is now rarely available, but is still found, mostly in coastal, family-owned restaurants and other small establishments known as "kioscos" where there are still strong ties to native heritage and classic slow-cooking skills.

The corn dough is similar to a standard arepas dough. Pork fat is melted down with annatto to add color. Corn flour is kneaded together with broth and some soft butter and the cooled pork fat mixture is incorporated to make a soft dough with a golden color. A large plantain leaf is greased with vegetable oil and the dough is flattened on the leaf to about a quarter inch thickness . The guiso filling is topped with a combination of onion, pepper, parsley, potatoes, raisins, almonds, chickpeas, capers, green olives, hard boiled eggs and bacon. The leaf is tied and boiled at a low heat.

Hallaca can be made in advance and frozen.

== Traditions ==
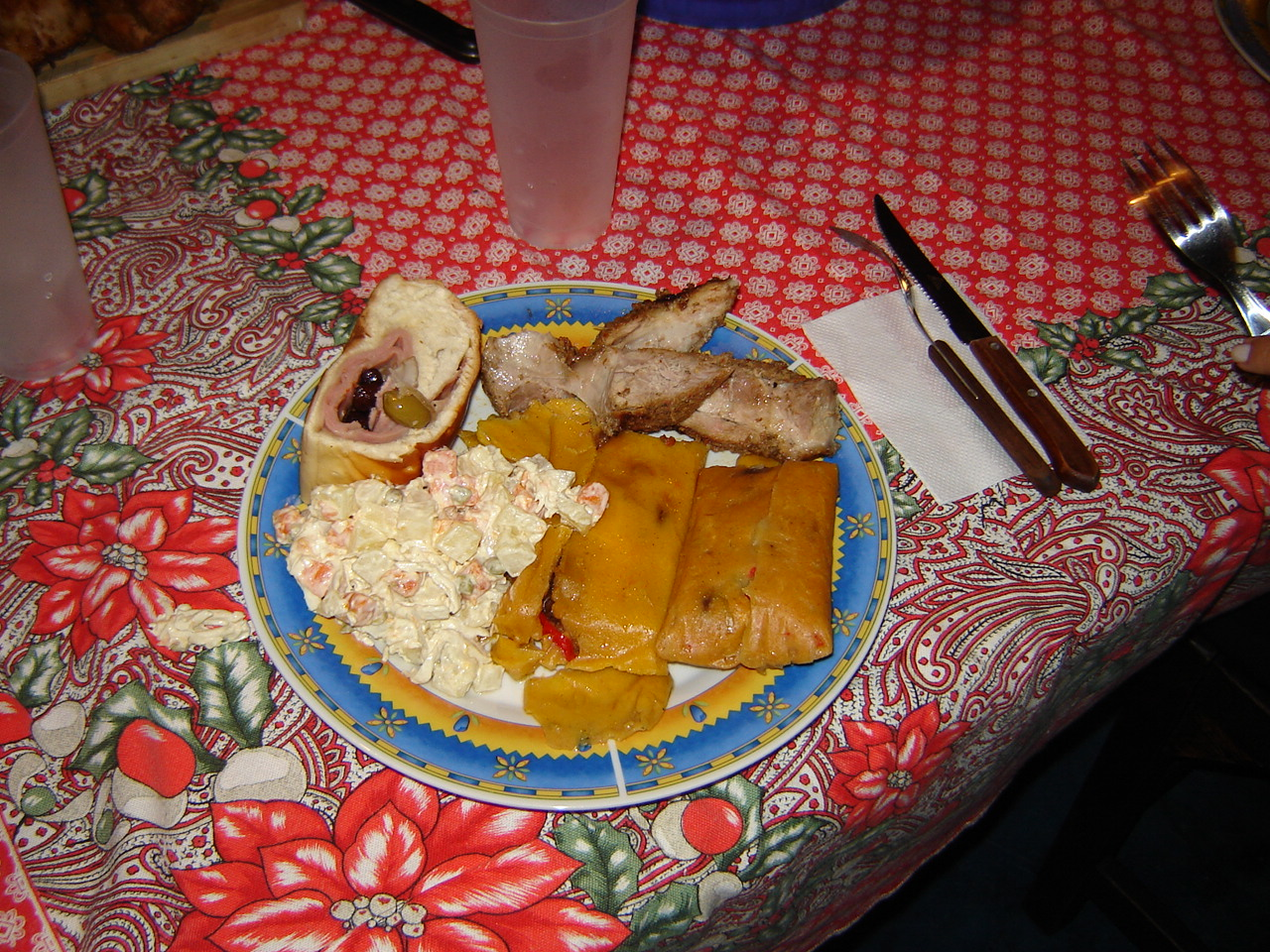
Traditional Christmas meal in Venezuela with pan de jamón and hallacas.

Although in the other countries of the region it is eaten any day of the year with the same name but different preparations, Hallaca is a staple of Colombian and Venezuelan Christmas celebrations. Christmas meals in Venezuela would include hallacas, pastries, pan de jamón and chicken stew, but not all families have been able to afford them during food shortages in Venezuela. In 2014, despite food shortages affecting the country, the Venezuelan government created a hallaca with a length of around 400 feet, a Guinness World Record. In contrast to Venezuelan tradition, hallacas are popular year-round in Ecuador, and there are several variants across the country's regions. Along with humitas, they are a staple of traditional Ecuadorian cuisine.

Families usually gather in the morning to prepare the ingredients.

== Controversy: Is the hallaca a tamale? ==
The hallaca is a traditional Venezuelan dish primarily consumed during the Christmas season. Over time, a debate has emerged surrounding the hallaca, often comparing or confusing it with the tamale, another traditional dish from various Latin American cultures. While some popular narratives suggest that the hallaca might be a derivative or a variant of the tamale, this claim is contested by several historians and chefs. They argue that, although both dishes use corn dough and are cooked wrapped in leaves, hallacas and tamales have distinct differences.

For instance, the hallaca has a singular type of filling and utilizes plantain leaves as its wrapper, whereas tamales can have a variety of fillings and can be wrapped in corn husks or plantain leaves. Additionally, tamales can be both sweet and savory, while the hallaca is mainly a savory dish.

=== Historical and cultural perspective ===
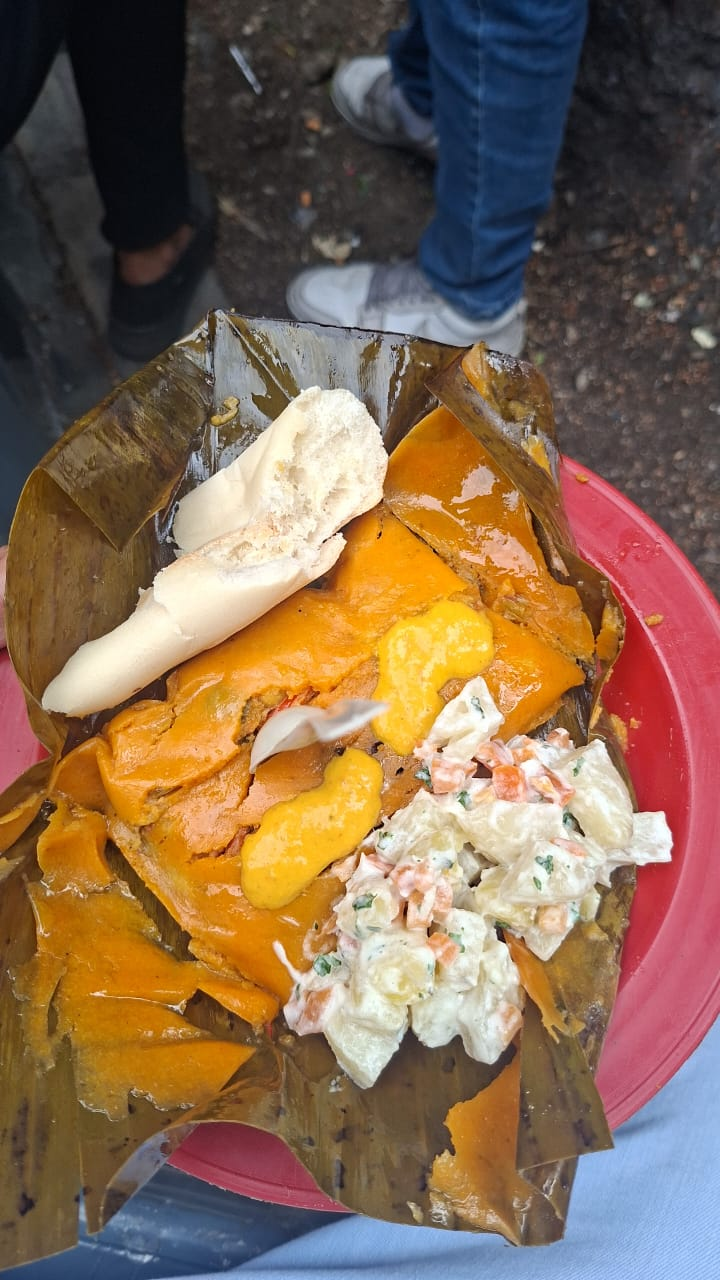
Hallaca mix of Venezuela

The name "hallaca" is distinctly Venezuelan, and historical records place it in Venezuela as early as 1538. In contrast, the tamale has a pre-Hispanic origin, linked to several indigenous cultures of Mesoamerica.

Venezuelan intellectual Arturo Uslar Pietri pointed out that the history of several centuries of Venezuela can be found reflected in the hallaca. According to Uslar Pietri, the hallaca is a complex dish with an equally intricate origin, merging influences from various cultures.

Venezuelan writer and historian Francisco Herrera Luque once remarked that comparing the robust hallaca with the tamale is like comparing a llama with a camel. While there are superficial similarities between the hallaca and the tamale, and both dishes reflect the rich history and diversity of their respective cultures, the hallaca is a unique dish with its own history, tradition, and cultural significance in Venezuela. Comparing it to the tamale, though common, is seen by many Venezuelans and culinary experts as an oversimplification.

== See also ==
- Bollos
- Pasteles
- Tamales
- List of maize dishes
- List of stuffed dishes

== Notes ==
1. Rosenblat, Ángel. (Venezuela Analysis, ???). hallaca.asp "hallaca". Retrieved 9 January 2005.
2. Castillo, Efrain. Revista Estampas (???) "Decanos de la Navidad" Retrieved 8 April 2012
