= Luis Carreño =

Venezuelan-American actor

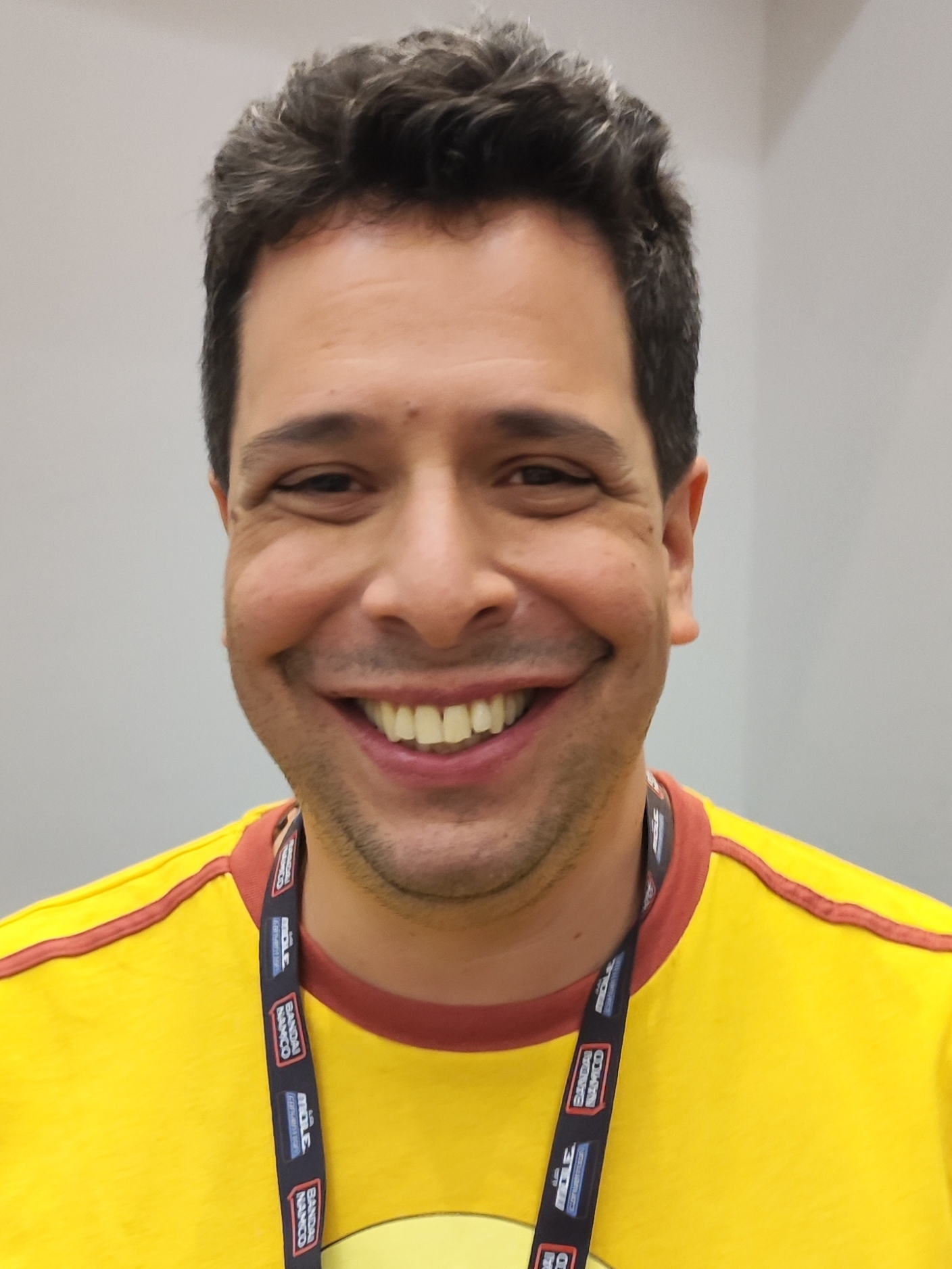
Carreño in 2025

Luis Geraldo Carreño Pinango (born 1975) is a Venezuelan actor. He is best known for playing numerous characters in the Venezuelan dubbing industry, most notably SpongeBob SquarePants (or Bob Esponja, as it is called in Spanish) in the Hispanic American version of the series of the same name, replacing Kaihiamal Martinez in the second season. After finishing his voice-work for The SpongeBob Movie: Sponge Out of Water in 2015, he moved to Miami, Florida, where he still voices SpongeBob while the rest of the cast still works for the series in Caracas.

He played the fisherman, Felix, in the 2011 short animated film No Stingray Pie for Dinner Tonight.

== Career ==
He began dubbing in 1992 at the age of 16 for the Brazilian soap opera Pantanal with the character of Reno.

He currently resides in Miami, Florida, where he continues to work in dubbing. He was also a radio host for Hot94, does publicity and has participated as an actor in theater and television.
