= Tostones =

Fried plantain found in Latin American and Caribbean cuisine

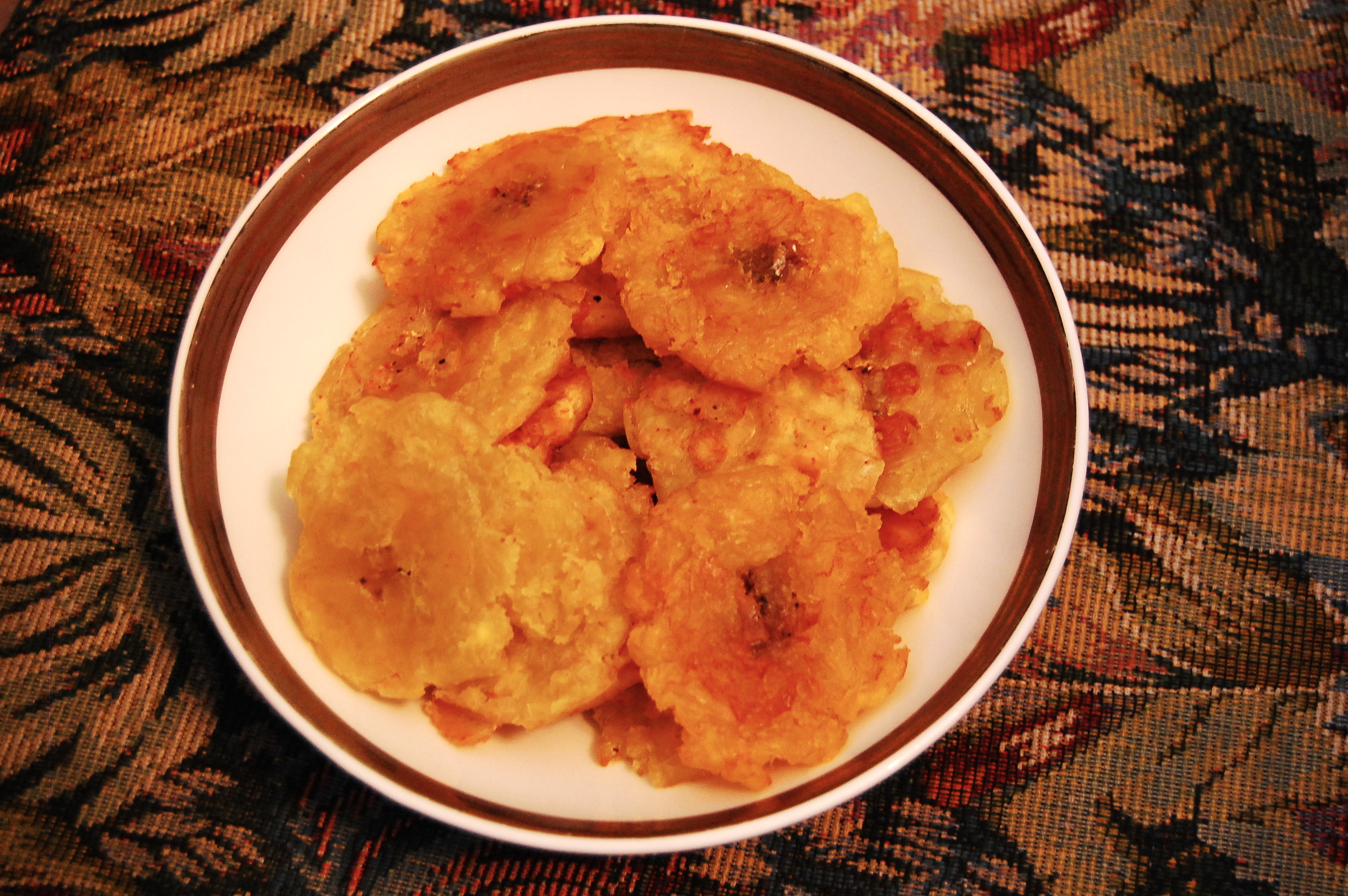
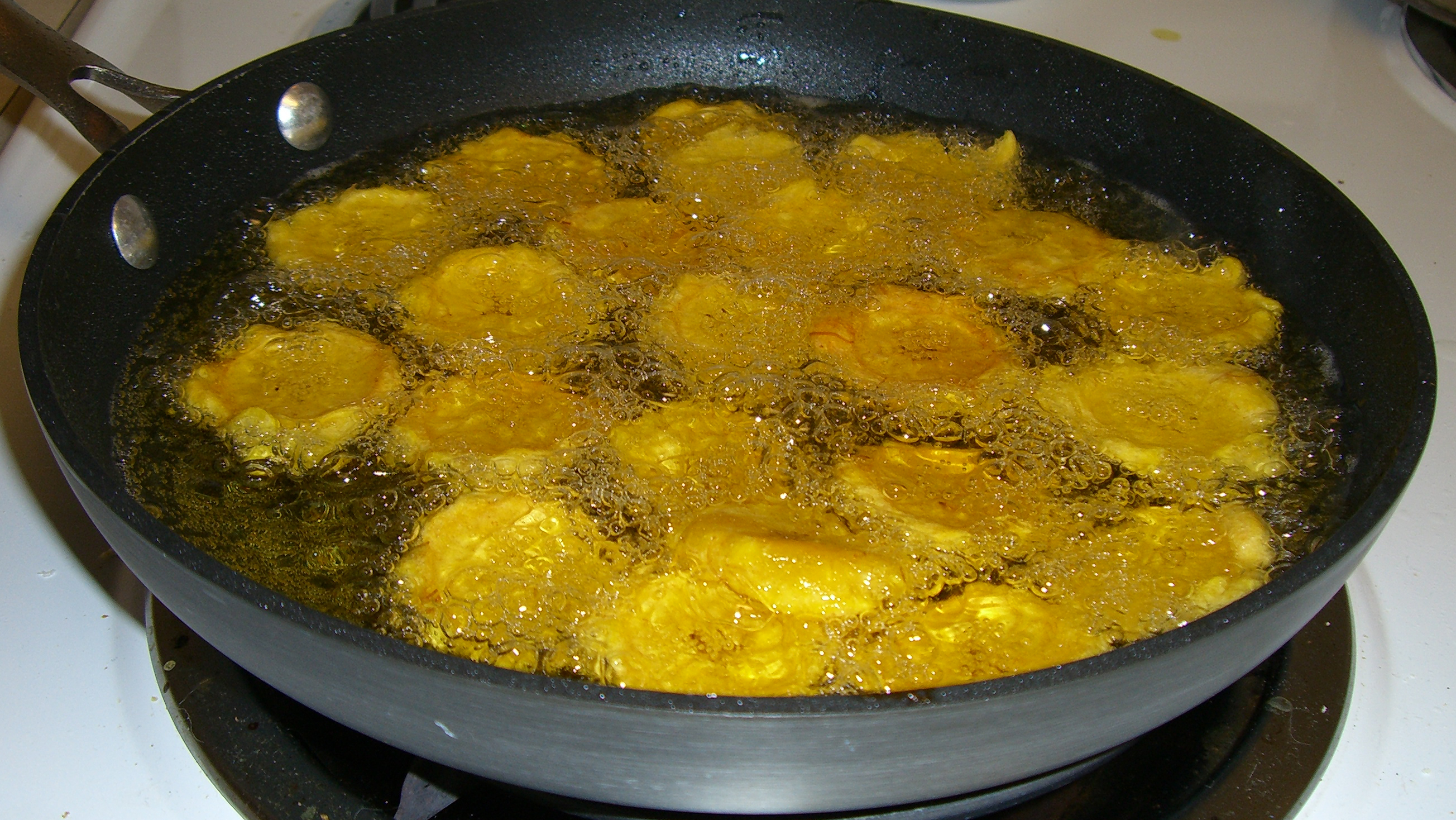
- Tostones being cooked
- Alternative names: Patacones
- Type: Side dish
- Main ingredients: Unripe plantains, oil
- Ingredients generally used: Salt, other seasonings
- Food energy (per 1 slice serving): 92 kcal (380 kJ)
Nutritional value
(per 1 slice serving)
- Protein: 1 g
- Fat: 5 g
- Carbohydrate: 14 g

Tostones (Spanish pronunciation: [tosˈtones], from the Spanish verb tostar, "to toast") are twice-fried plantain slices commonly found in Latin American and Caribbean cuisines.

Most commonly known as tostones in Puerto Rico, Mexico, Nicaragua, Cuba, Honduras, Venezuela, and the Dominican Republic, they are also known as tachinos or chatinos in Cuba, bannann peze in Haiti, patacones in Ecuador, Panama, Venezuela, Colombia, Costa Rica, and Peru and sometimes patacón pisao in Colombia.

== Preparation ==
Green (unripe) plantains are peeled, sliced lengthwise, diagonally, or widthwise, and then fried twice. The raw slices of plantains are fried for one to six minutes on each side until they are golden in color, and removed and patted to remove excess cooking oil. Afterward, they are pounded flat with a hinged utensil made for the task, called a tostonera, or with any kitchen utensil with a sufficiently large, flat surface—for instance, between two plates. The flattened plantain slices are then fried once again until they are crisp and golden brown.

== Serving ==
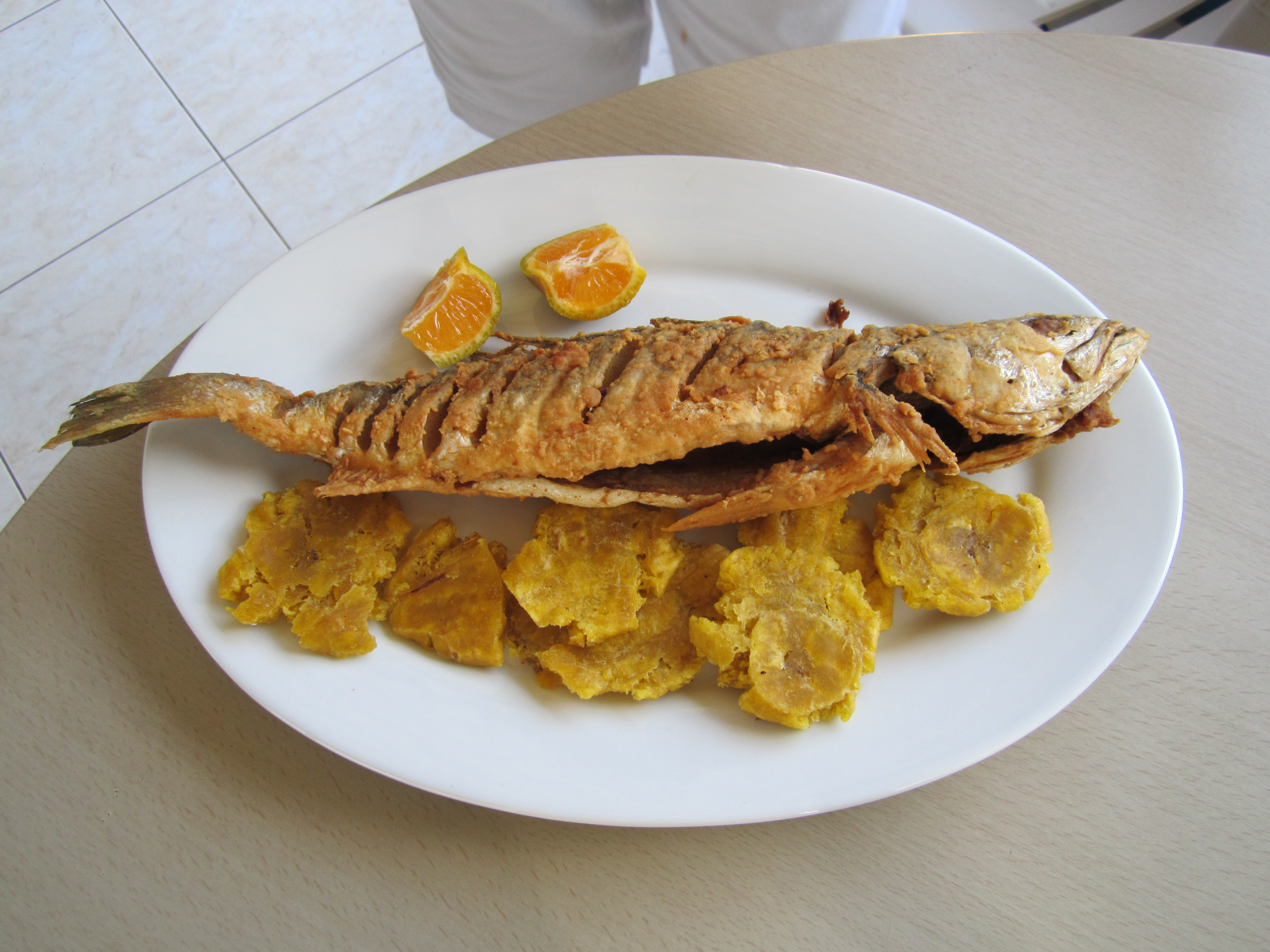
Patacones served with fried corvina in Panama

Tostones are salted and eaten much like potato chips (crisps) or french fries. They are a staple of Latin American countries and the Caribbean, including Cuba, Puerto Rico] the Dominican Republic, Panama, the north coast of Honduras, and Haiti, where they are often served with the traditional griot (fried pork) or pikliz, a spicy slaw. In some regions, dipping them in mojo (a garlic sauce) or ají is customary. In Colombia, they are sometimes served with hogao sauce or topped with seasoned shredded beef. In Costa Rica, they are often eaten with a paste-like dip made from black beans. In the Dominican Republic, they are commonly served with fresh lime wedges to squeeze over them and salt for sprinkling. In Guatemala on the Caribbean side, they are usually served as a side dish with fish or poultry, sprinkled with a little salt. In some countries, they are served topped with cheese as an appetizer or with shrimp ceviche, pulled chicken, or avocado salad. They can also be bought prepared from supermarkets. In Nicaragua, they are typically served with fried cheese and sometimes with refried beans. In Puerto Rico, they are commonly seasoned with garlic salt and eaten with fry sauce, mojo, or pique verde boricua.

They can also be found in West African cuisine, where they are referred to as plantain crisps.

== Tools ==
A tostonera is a tool used to make tostones. Tostoneras can be made from wood, plastic, or metal and can vary in size. They are an essential tool in Latin kitchens.

== Other uses of the term ==
In Honduras, the term tostón may also refer to the 50-cent coin of the local currency, the lempira. This is also the case in Mexico, for the 50-centavo coin (half of a peso).

== See also ==
- Chifle
- Fried plantain
- Jibarito
- List of banana dishes
- Mofongo
- Tajada
