= Guanime =

Puerto Rican dish

Guanimes are a prepared food that can be traced back to the pre-Columbian era in Puerto Rico. Guanimas translates to corn bread By the Tainos who were native Indians from Puerto Rico. Traditionally, Guanimes are made with cornmeal, sugar, salt, all purpose flour and butter, wrapped in banana leaves. These may be served with a salt cod stew (bacalao guisado) or during Easter, "holy broth" (caldo de coco y pescado, a soup made using coconut milk and fish).

== Origin ==
Guanimes are related to tamales and hallacas. Cornmeal masa is wrapped in corn husk stuffed with meat, nuts, fish, beans, or nothing at all. They are then boiled like tamales and hallacas. Taínos in Puerto Rico also mashed a variety of tubers and squash into the cornmeal masa. This later became the modern day pasteles.

== Modern Puerto Rico ==
To prepare guanime dough (masa) dry corn kernels must be boiled until soft and left over night in water. Once the corn has softened even more it is then mashed with salt, lard, broth and coconut milk until it resembles a dough similar to bread. A small amount of the dough is then put onto a banana leaf forming into small logs, wrap and tied on both ends. Once wrap they boiled in salt water. They are then served traditionally with salted cod fish stew.

Guanimes de Plátano replace corn with green plantains with the same ingredients.

Guanimes dulces are sweet and prepared with sweet plantains, cornmeal, milk, coconut milk, raisins, vanilla, anise seeds, honey or molasses. There is also a cassava version known as Rusiao de yuca and are steamed on a grill.

== See also ==
- Caribbean cuisine
- Hallaca
- List of stuffed dishes
- Pasteles
- Tamales
