= Pastele stew =

Hawaii-adapted stew based on Puerto Rican pastele

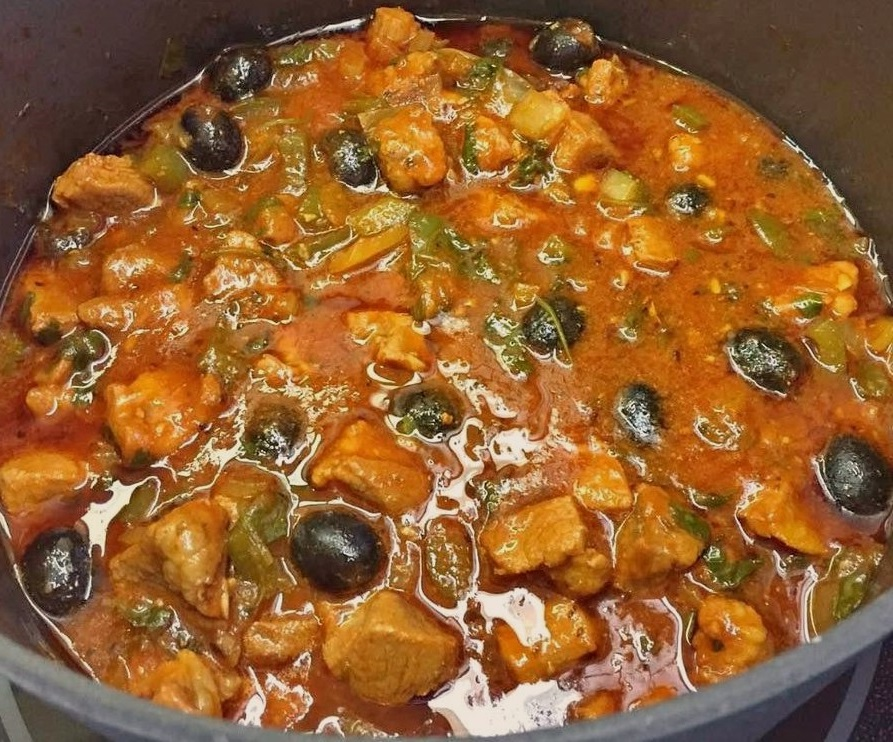
- Pastele stew
- Alternative names: Patele stew, pastele de oya y mestura (mestura), metura (Note: Its original Spanish name translates to "pastele [cooked in a] pot and mixed"; Pastel lit. "dumpling"; oya (or olla) lit. "pot for cooking stew"; mestura (or mistura) lit. "mixture") (Note: The Hawaiian Pidgin pronunciation of pasteles as "patele" and mestura as "metura" are the result of back-formation, the letter "S" absent from the Hawaiian alphabet.)
- Type: Stew
- Course: Main
- Place of origin: Puerto Rico
- Region or state: Hawaii
- Serving temperature: Hot
- Main ingredients: Pork, green banana, taro, sofrito (sazón)
- Ingredients generally used: Annatto (achiote), olives, capsicum, onion, garlic, oregano, cilantro, tomato sauce (paste), chili
- Variations: Pastel al Horno (baked pastele), Pastele de Olla (pot pastele)

Pastele stew (or pastele de oya y mestura) is a Hawaii inspired pork stew of Puerto Rican origin. It is an adaptation of the dish pasteles introduced by the Puertorriqueños who came to work on the sugar plantations in the early 1900s. Pastele making is often a laborious task reserved for special occasions and holidays such as Christmas. Pastele stew was developed as a simplified everyday version.

It remains a beloved Puerto Rican-inspired dish catered to the local Hawaii palate, but a contentious recipe for Puerto Ricans not living in Hawaii. The pastele stew is found as a plate lunch item at food trucks and restaurants, a filling for manapua, and a common fundraising item. As a savory dish, pastele stew pairs with plain white rice or "gandule rice" (arroz con gandules).

== Ingredients ==
Like Puerto Rico, Hawaii is an island where similar ingredients can be found, a further development and continuation of cocina criolla. Like how the Native Hawaiians wrapped their laulau with ti leaves, Puertorriqueños would adapt to wrapping their pasteles with the same.

The masa―commonly made with plantain or yautía that usually fills pasteles are substituted with local varieties of bananas and taro―is used as a thickening agent rather than as a distinguishable ingredient for this stewed version. In one popular recipe, the bananas are separately made into pastel, dumplings akin to gnocchi, and later folded into the stew to finish. In some recipes, the bananas or masa is omitted altogether.

Pastele stew is partial to affordable pork cuts such as Boston butt. Other meats, such as ham or chicken, can be added or substituted but are not typical. Like pasteles, pastele stew is seasoned with sofrito and annatto oil. It is also not uncommon to utilize sazón packet seasoning. Another characteristic of local pasteles and pastele stew is that it can be spicy, due to the Asian influence.

== Preparation ==
Puerto Rican cooking typically takes a long time to prepare compared to American dishes because of the various condiments that require prior preparation beforehand such as masa, sofrito, and annatto as well as other mise en place. The preparation of pastele stew is a combination of all these condiments and ingredients.

Pork is cubed and sautéed in annatto followed by the sofrito vegetables and seasoning spices. The tomato sauce and water are added, and simmered until the pork is tender. Masa is added to the liquid to the preferred thickness. The stew is garnished with the bell peppers, olives, and cilantro.

== Related dishes ==
Pastel al horno (lit. "baked pastel") may have been one of the precursors to the popularity of pastele stew. It appears in "The Electric Kitchen" recipe database of Hawaiian Electric in 1998 leading up to the 100th anniversary of the arrival of the first Puerto Ricans to Hawaii. The dish follows the typical steps in cooking pasteles. However, rather than making them into individual parcels, it is made into a casserole-like dish. The banana masa is folded into the cooked pork mixture then baked in a baking pan. (Note: The contributors, Julie Robley and Laura Martin-Robley, would later publish the same recipe in a cookbook the following year in 1999. The recipe follows a blurb (rather than as a formula) on how to make "pastele stew" which directs a person to "add water or chicken broth to the pastele meat...as much as you want...adjust seasoning if needed.")

Another similar Hawaiian dish based on pasteles is pastele de olla (lit. "pot pastele"). Like the stewed and baked version, this dish also combines the meat mixture and masa. The mixture is slowly cooked in a pot for two to three hours.

== See also ==
- Lūʻau (food)
- Menudo
- Pasteles
