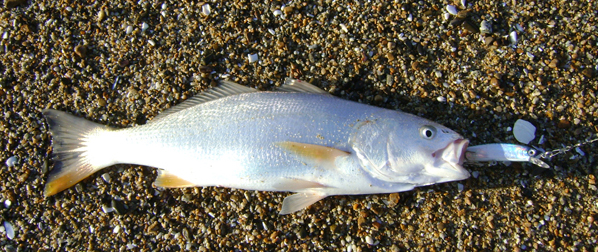
- Corvina

Conservation status
- Data Deficient (IUCN 3.1)

Scientific classification
- Kingdom: Animalia
- Phylum: Chordata
- Class: Actinopterygii
- Division: Teleostei
- Order: Acanthuriformes
- Family: Sciaenidae
- Genus: Cilus; Delfin, 1900
- Species: C. gilberti

Binomial name
- Cilus gilberti (C. C. Abbott, 1899)

Synonyms
- Sciaena gilberti Abbott, 1899; Cilus montti Delfin, 1900

= Cilus =

Species of fish

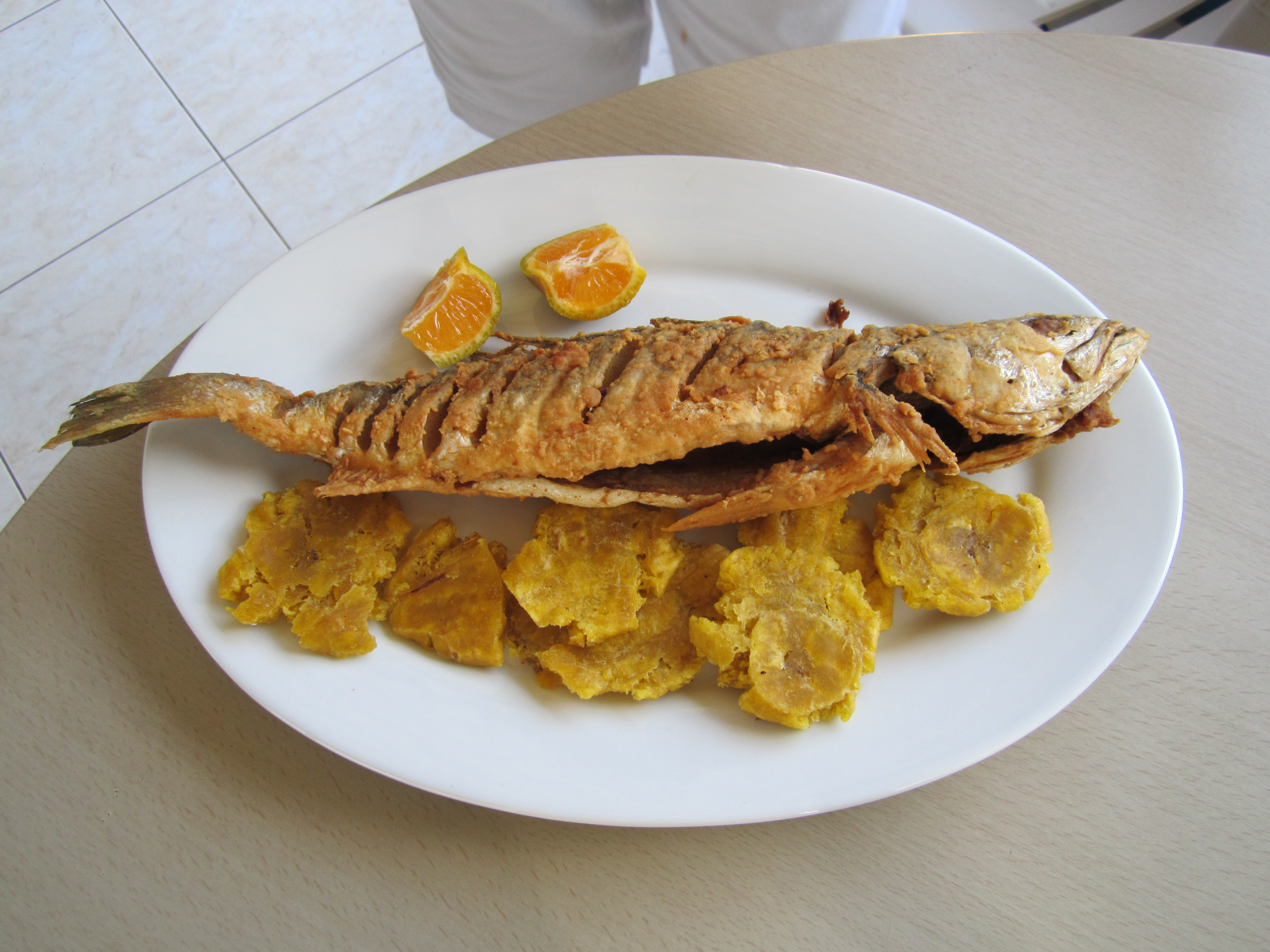
Fried corvina served with patacones

Cilus is a monospecific genus of marine, ray-finned fish belonging to the family Sciaenidae, the croakers and drums. Its only species is Cilus gilberti, the corvina or corvina drum, which is found mostly tropical to temperate coastal waters of the southeastern Pacific along Central and South America. The corvina is highly prized in South America as a food fish.

== Taxonomy ==
Cilus was first proposed as a monospecific genus in 1900 by Chilean ichthyologist Federico Teobaldo Delfin, when he described Cilus montti, which had a type localities given as Talcahuano, San Vicente and Concepción, Chile, as its only species. Delfin's species was later established to be a synonym of Charles C. Abbott's Sciaena gilberti, which he had described in 1899 from Callao in Peru. This taxon belongs to the family Sciaenidae in the order Acanthuriformes.

== Etymology ==
Cilus is derived from cilonus, which means "one with a long and narrow head", an allusion to the long and compressed head of this species. The fish was given the specific name gilberti by Abbott, in honour of his "friend and instructor" Charles Henry Gilbert.

== Description ==
The corvina is similar in appearance to its relatives, the weakfish and spotted seatrout. Its body is blue-grey on top and silvery overall with small scales, and is elongated and somewhat compressed in shape. It has a large mouth and a dorsal fin that is deeply notched between spiny and soft parts. It reaches 40 cm (16 in) or more in total length.

== Range and habitat ==
The corvina is found along the South American Pacific coastline from Chile to Panama, and also around the Galapagos. It inhabits soft bottoms at depths of 5 to 50 m (16 to 164 ft).

== Culinary uses ==
The corvina has a white and flaky texture and a mild, sweet taste. Cooking methods include grilling, baking, and frying, and it is served as sashimi. It is a popular choice in ceviche.
