= Polvorosas =

Cookie from Colombia and Venezuela

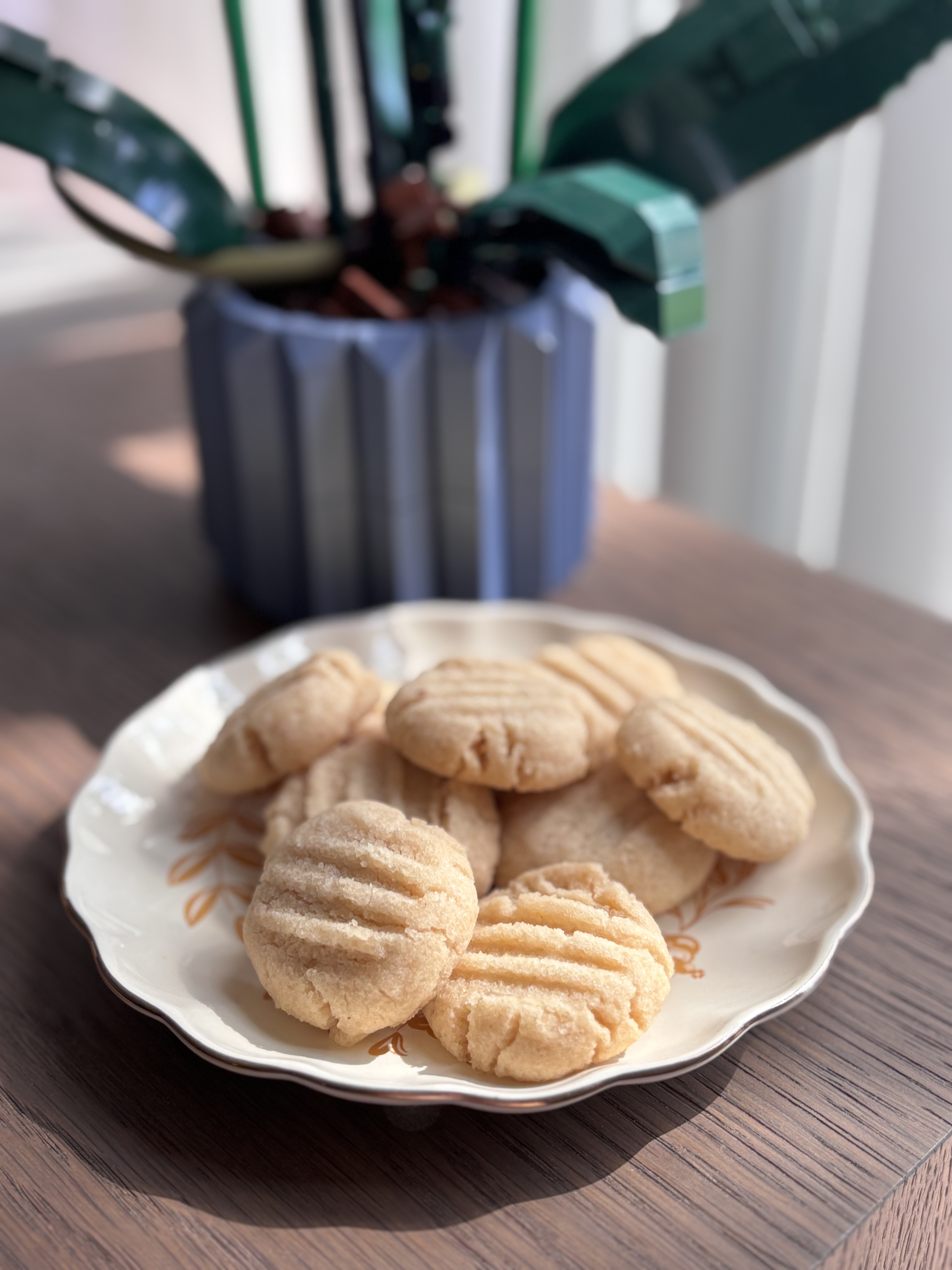
- Type: Cookies
- Place of origin: Colombia and Venezuela
- Region or state: South America
- Similar dishes: Polvorón

Polvorosas (Spanish pronunciation: [polβoɾosas]) are traditional Venezuelan and Colombian cookies. They are often made with flour, cornstarch, sugar, milk, and butter (or lard). The word stems from "pólvora," meaning particles that are reduced to one solid thing, in other words, dust. The cookies are known for having a crumble like texture, so they are broken down while being consumed. These cookies are a variation of the Spanish "polvorón," and were adopted by Colombians and Venezuelans during the Spanish colonization.

== Origins ==
Their origins stem from colonial times, when the prevalent presence of mills along the Cauca River in Colombia promoted the creative use of sugar and Panela. From this period of creativity stemmed desserts such as polvorosas and panderitos. Polvorosas were popularized by nuns within their convents who held the practice of making a variety of desserts. The food created within these kitchens often utilized a variety of cultural elements which were gathered as a result of Christian tradition. These cookies can often be found in parties, wrapped in a variety of colored paper as a compliment to a cup of coffee or other drinks.

== Variations ==
Polvorosas

Polvorosas hold resemblance to a Spanish dish polvorón. Polvorón is made with almonds, which are abundant in Spain. Polvorosas don't include almonds as they aren't easily accessible in South American countries. This change required a larger amount of lard to be incorporated to maintain its texture. They also hold resemblance to panderitos, which are made with cassava flour.

Polvorosas can also be made with corn starch, giving them a soft, less crumbly, taste. They are also be made with vegetable shortening, which has become more accessible than lard as it cheaper and shelf-stable, it was also thought to be healthier. This change originated in the 20th century, when they also got smaller, more bite-sized, compared to its original counterpart.
