= Pan de cazón =

Mexican dish

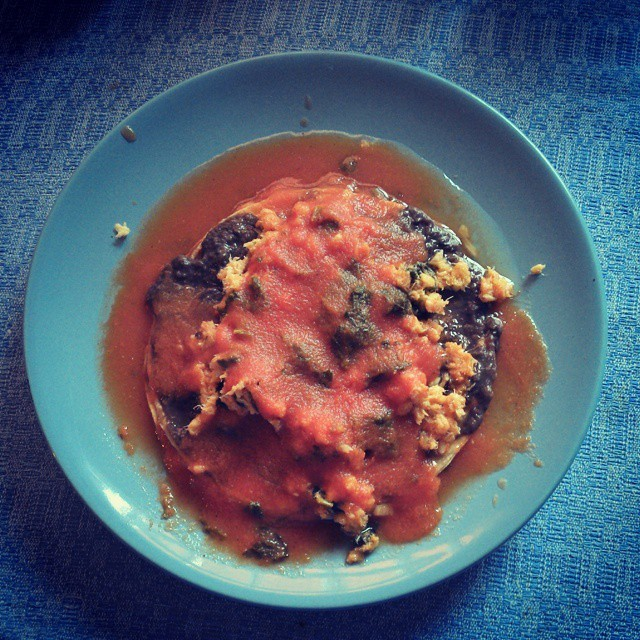
- Type: Casserole
- Place of origin: Mexico
- Region or state: Campeche
- Main ingredients: Tortillas, shark
- Ingredients generally used: Black beans, tomato sauce

Pan de cazón (Spanish: "bread of small shark") is a casserole dish in Mexican cuisine that is prepared in the style of lasagna using layered tortillas with shark meat such as dogfish shark, black beans or refried black beans and spiced tomato sauce with habanero. It has been described as a specialty dish of the state of Campeche, Mexico.

The dish is typically prepared with blacktip shark in Campeche, and in Yucatán dogfish shark is typically used. Preparation traditionally involves boiling the shark meat in seasoned water and then shredding it.

== Variations ==
The dish may be prepared with fish other than shark meat.

== See also ==
- List of casserole dishes
- List of Mexican dishes
