= Ajilimójili =

Chili sauce from Puerto Rico

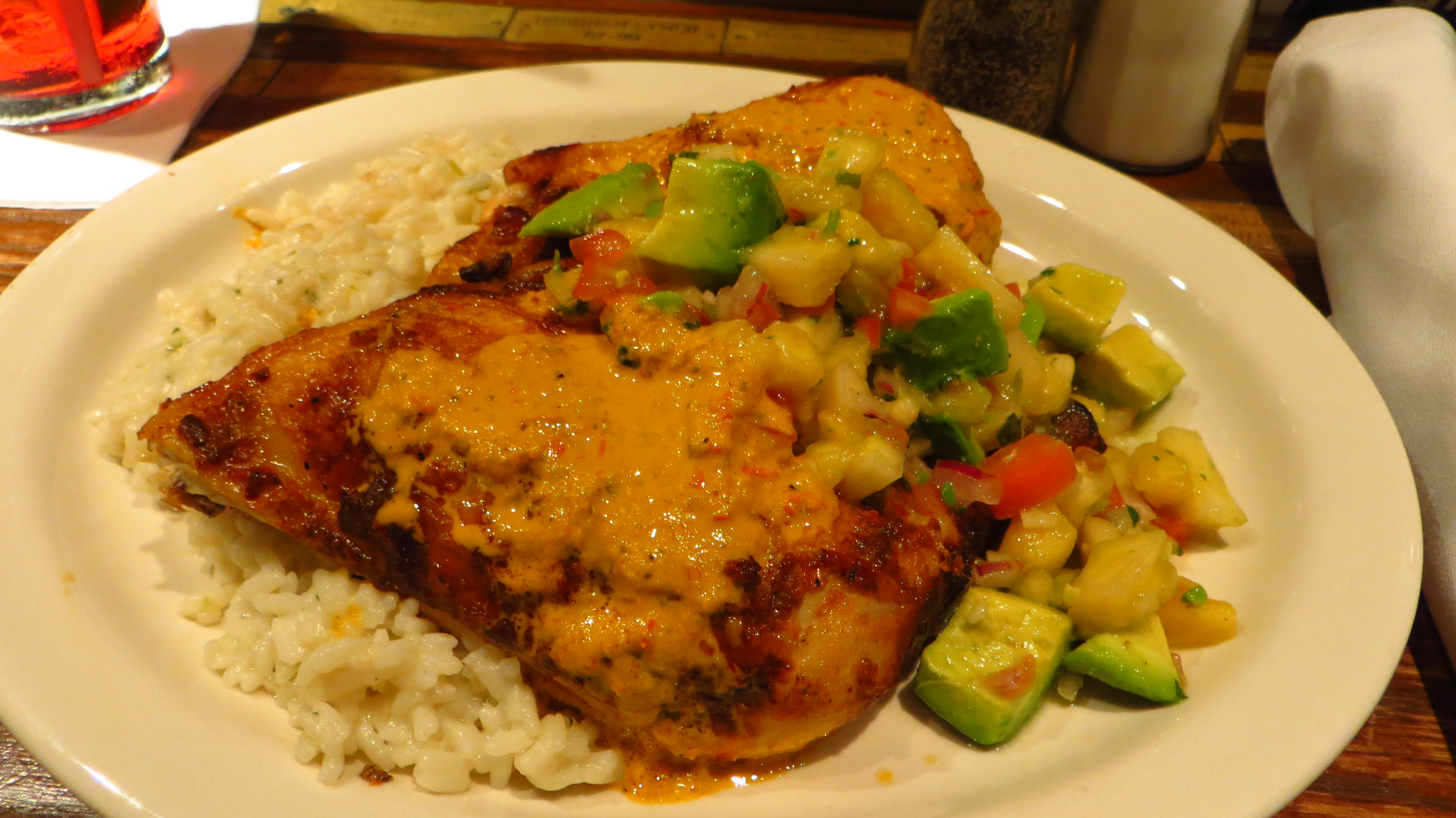
- Chicken with ajilimójili, rice, and salsa
- Place of origin: Puerto Rico
- Main ingredients: olive oil, garlic, cilantro or culantro, hot peppers, pepper, vinegar or citrus

Ajilimójili is a hot or hot and sweet chili sauce from Puerto Rico, traditionally served over grilled seafood, vegetables, pasteles, boiled tuber vegetables and especially grilled meats.

== Description ==
Ajilimójili is a combination of olive oil or butter, garlic, cilantro, chilies, bell pepper, cumin, Cuban oregano, vinegar, sour orange chopped or blended, simmered and cooled to serve. A variant, sweet ajilimójili, adds honey and tomato sauce.

The sauce is one of the essential elements of Puerto Rican cooking.

== See also ==
- Puerto Rican cuisine
- Salsa (sauce)
- Mojo (sauce)
