= Pan de jamón =

Type of bread in Venezuela

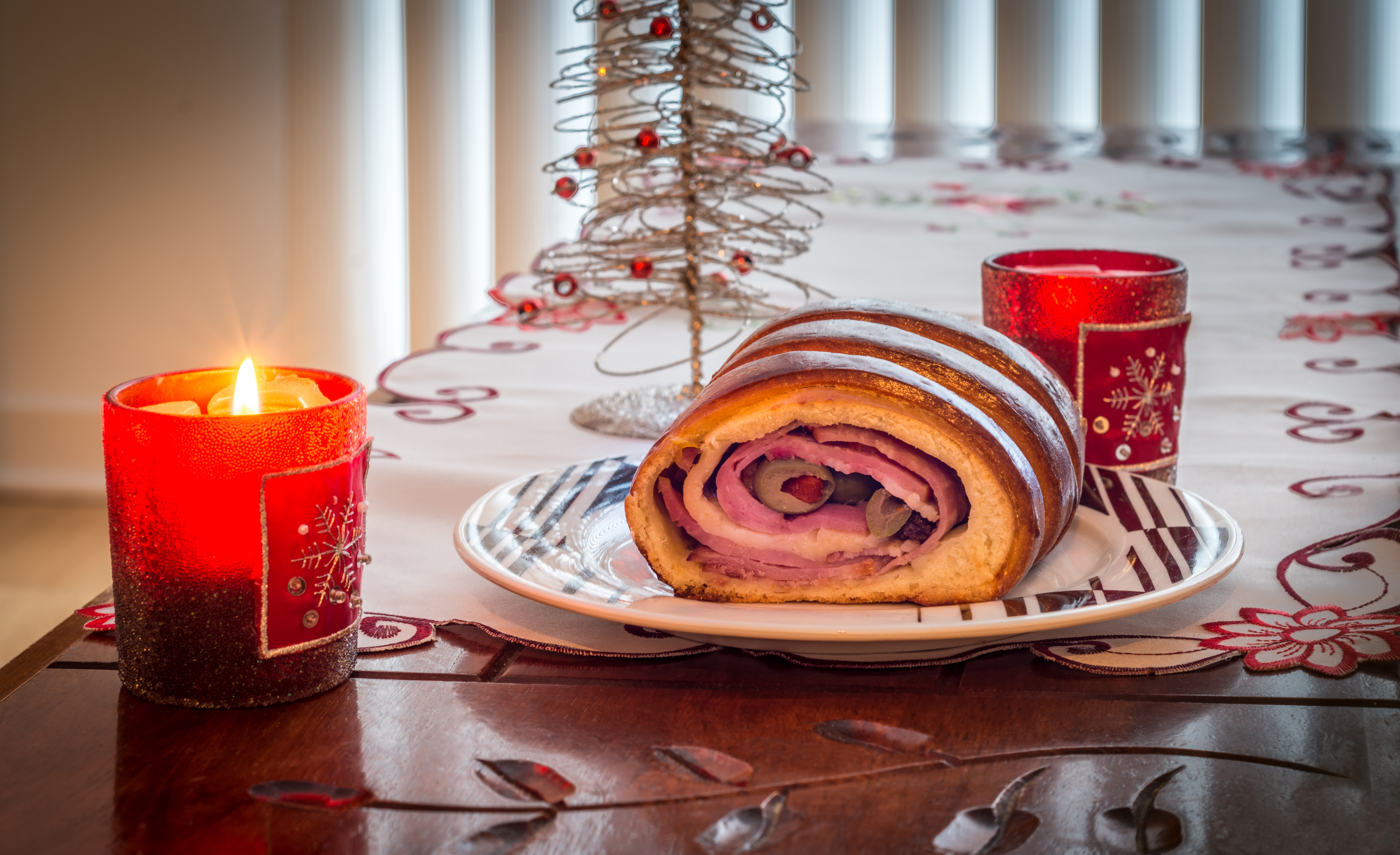
Homemade Pan de jamón

Pan de jamón (ham bread) is a typical Venezuelan Christmas bread, filled with ham, raisins and green olives. Many variations have been created, some filling the bread with other ingredients like turkey or cream cheese and others using puff pastry as the dough. Pan de jamón appeared in the beginning of the 20th century and slowly became a tradition in the Christmas season in Venezuela and Madeira.

== History ==
According to Miro Popić, Venezuelan journalist and commentator specialized in gastronomy, the recipe is believed to be created in December 1905 by Gustavo Ramella, owner of a bakery located in Caracas. Apparently the original bread was filled only with ham. Other recognized bakeries started making the bread and added new ingredients. By 1920 olives, nuts, and capers were added to the filling.

== See also ==
- List of ham dishes
- Venezuelan cuisine
