= Recaíto =

Cooking base made of pureed aromatics

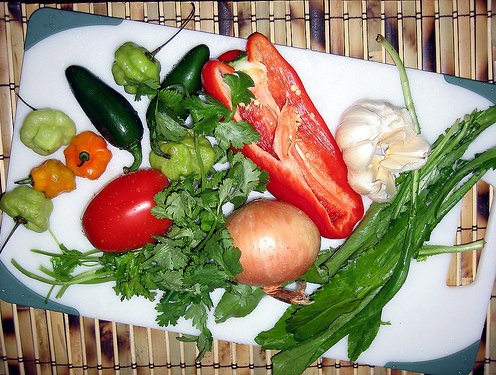
Puerto Rican recaito and sofrito ingredients

Recaíto (also sometimes called sofrito) is a cooking base made of pureed aromatics. Its distinctive green color comes from the inclusion of green peppers and herbs. Recaíto does not usually include tomatoes, although they may be added for extra flavor.

== Preparation ==
Recaíto is mix of onions, garlic, ajicitos, green bell pepper, and much cilantro and culantro. All of the ingredients are blended until smooth.

== Cooking ==
Ham, salted pork, and/or tocino (bacon) is first browned in a pot with oil, lard, olive oil or annatto oil. Recaíto is then added and is cooked until most of its liquid has evaporated. When done, tomato sauce (as a thickener or bonding agent) is added with a mix of stuffed olives and capers called alcaparrado, spices and dry herbs. Legumes and other meats are then added to the pot and slowly cooked. Recaíto is usually a base for stews, soups and picadillo in most Puerto Rican homes.

== Origin ==
Recaíto originally refers to a message or an order made. When most people did not have refrigeration, they had to buy an onion, cilantro leaves, and peppers to mash in a pilon. Usually a housewife would leave an order (recado) for these ingredients to be picked up later. It is said that this is the origin of the word recaíto, which translates to English as "little order/errand".
