= Aborrajados de plátano maduro =

Colombian appetizer

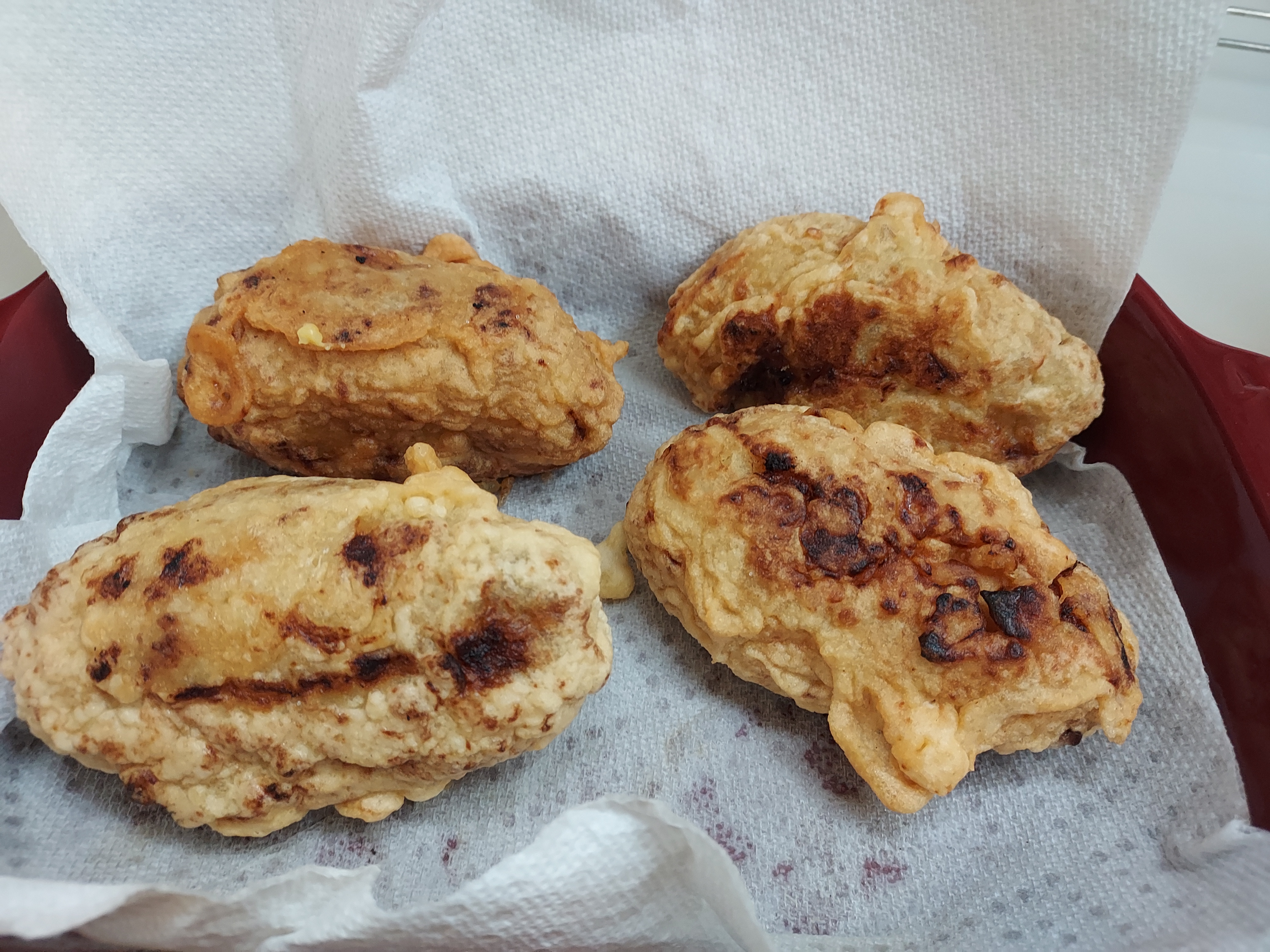
- Homemade Aborrajados
- Alternative names: Aborrajados colombianos
- Course: Hors d'oeuvre
- Place of origin: Colombia and Ecuador
- Region or state: South America
- Main ingredients: Plantains, cheese, eggs, flour, sugar, milk

Aborrajados de plátano maduro (also called Aborrajados colombianos) is a dish of deep fried plantains stuffed with cheese in Colombian cuisine. Abborrajado (called albardilla in Castilian Spanish) refers to an egg and flour batter used to fry certain foods in a manner similar to fritters. In general, aborrajado means a dish of cheese-filled plantains dipped in batter and deep-fried (giving it its name, which means "battered"), but the term can be used for other variations of the dish like Aborrajado con Chicharrón, which includes chicharrón (fried pork belly), in addition to the basic recipe of plantains and cheese. Guava paste, known as bocadillo in Colombia, is also sometimes included as part of the filling.
