= Dominican Republic cuisine =

Culinary traditions of the Dominican Republic

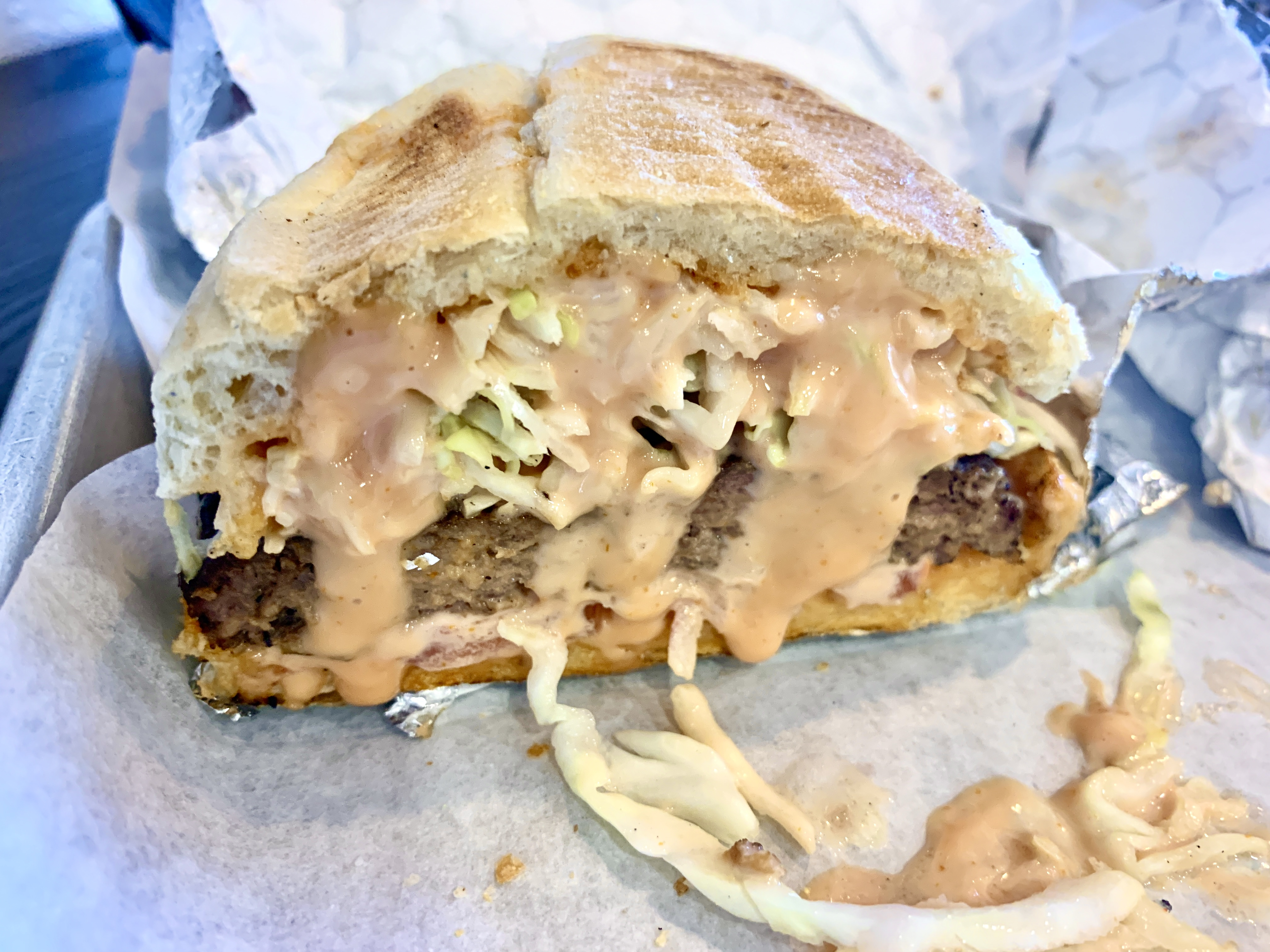
Chimichurri burger

Dominican cuisine is made up of Spanish, Indigenous Taíno, Middle Eastern, and African influences. The most recent influences in Dominican cuisine are from the British West Indies and China.

== Dishes and their origins ==
The Taíno cultivated many types of tubers such as yuca, yautia, and batata. An important staple of Dominican cuisine adopted from the Taíno people is casabe, made from cassava root and important to the diet of the Taíno. Casabe is served with soups and stews in the Dominican Republic. Spices such as vanilla, nutmeg, and pepper most often used by Dominican cooks derive from Spanish cuisine.

The Dominican Republic was formerly a Spanish colony. Many Spanish traits are still present in the island. Many traditional Spanish dishes have found a new home in the Dominican Republic, some with a twist. African and Taíno dishes still hold strong, some of them unchanged.

All or nearly all food groups are accommodated in typical Dominican cuisine, as it incorporates meat or seafood; grains, especially rice, corn (native to the island), and wheat; vegetables, such as beans and other legumes, potatoes, yuca, or plantains, and salad; dairy products, especially milk and cheese; and fruits, such as oranges, bananas, and mangos. However, there is heaviest consumption of starches and meats, and the least of dairy products and non-starchy vegetables.

Sofrito, a sautéed mix including local herbs and spices, is used in many dishes. Throughout the south-central coast, bulgur — or whole wheat — is a main ingredient in quipes and tipili, two dishes brought by Levantine Middle Eastern immigrants. Other well-known foods and dishes include chicharrón, squash, pastelitos or empanadas, pasteles en hoja (ground roots pockets), chimichurris, plátanos maduros (ripe plantain), wasakaka, and tostones/fritos (fried plantains).

Bouillon cubes are used heavily in the preparation of Dominican lunch food.

=== Taíno dishes ===
- Mabí – a root beer-like drink made from the roots of a local tree
- Casabe – Flatbread made out of yuca. Resembles a round cracker.
- Pera piña – Pineapple peels drink.
- Guarapo de piña – Fermented pineapple juice.
- Guanimo – Same as tamales with no filling or stuffed with picadillo.

=== Spanish dishes ===
- Arroz con dulce – rice pudding made with long-grain rice, milk, sugar, cinnamon, raisins, star anise, clove, and nutmeg.
- Buñuelos de bacalao – a codfish fritter popular throughout the Caribbean and Latin America. Also known as bacalaíto in the Dominican Republic.
- Crème caramel – sweet egg custard known as flan. Coconut flan is known as quesillo de coco.
- Gofio – sweet cornmeal powder from the Canary Islands.
- Longaniza—a type of spicy sausage originally from Spain.
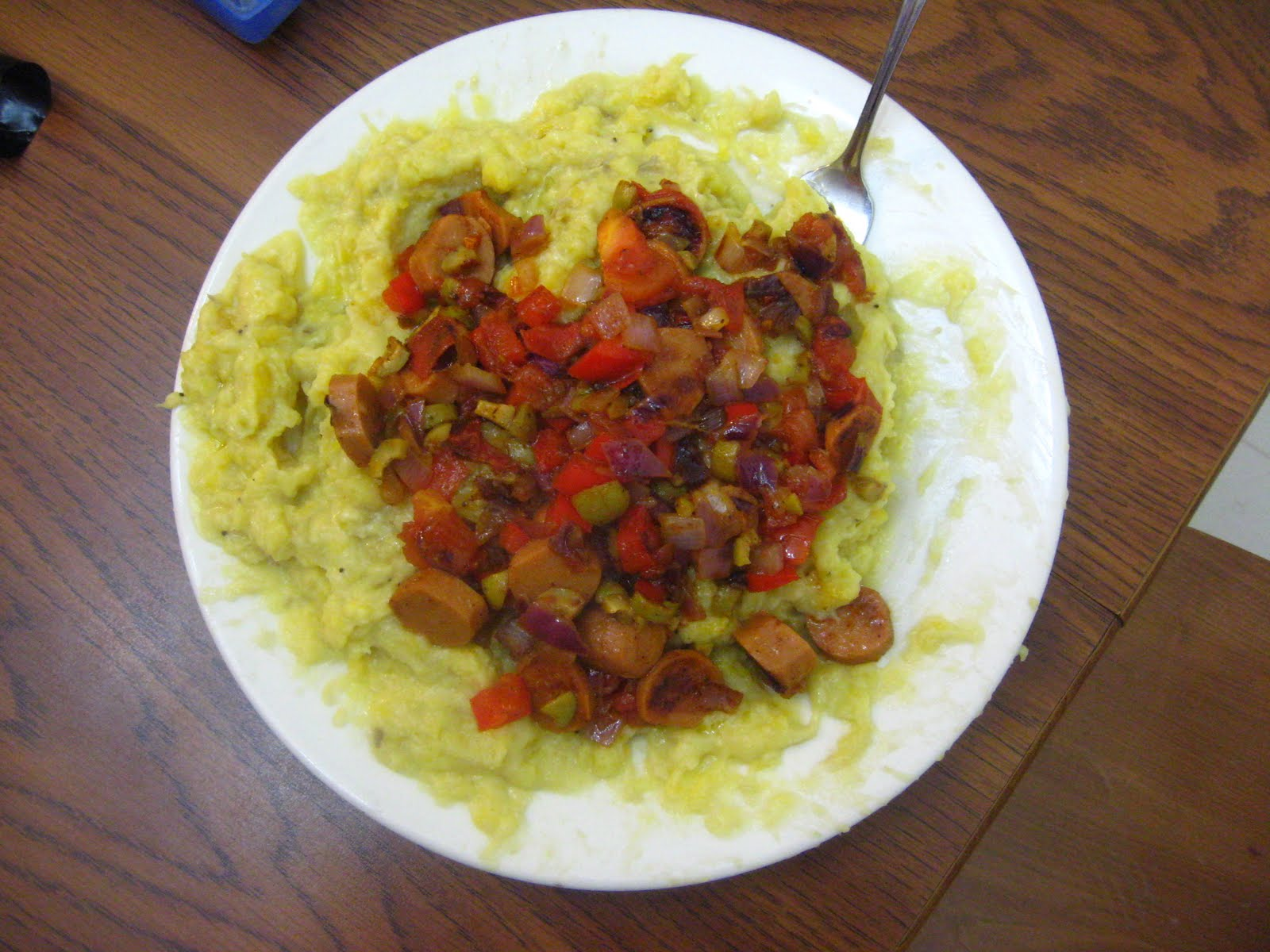
  Mangú

=== African dishes ===
- Mangú – mashed, boiled green plantains can be traced back to west Africa where it is known as fufu. This is a typical and official national breakfast in the Dominican Republic but can also be served at lunch and dinner. Mangú is typically served with queso frito (fried cheese), fried Dominican salami, fried eggs, and topped with red onions cooked in vinegar and oil. This combination is also known as los tres golpes (the three hits).

=== Middle Eastern dishes ===
A few dishes have been adopted from a wave of Lebanese immigration into the Dominican Republic. These dishes reflect significant changes from the traditional Middle Eastern, including the preparation, using beef instead of lamb, and leaving out many spices (cumin, cardamom, coriander seeds, saffron, and others), herbs (rosemary, mint, dill, marjoram, Greek oregano, and others), spice blends (za'atar and baharat), seeds, and nuts (pine nuts, pistachios, sesame seeds, hazelnuts, and others). Many of these dishes are traditionally served with a sauce in the Middle East, while in the Dominican Republic they are served alone. Many of these spices and flavoring have been replaced with Dominican oregano, bell peppers, and chicken bouillon.

- Pilaf – Rice with raisins and almonds. It is usually eaten around Christmas.
- Arabic rice – Rice cooked with toasted pasta.
- Kipes or quipes – Deep-fried bulgur roll filled with picadillo.
- Niño envuelto – Cabbage roll filled with beef and rice.

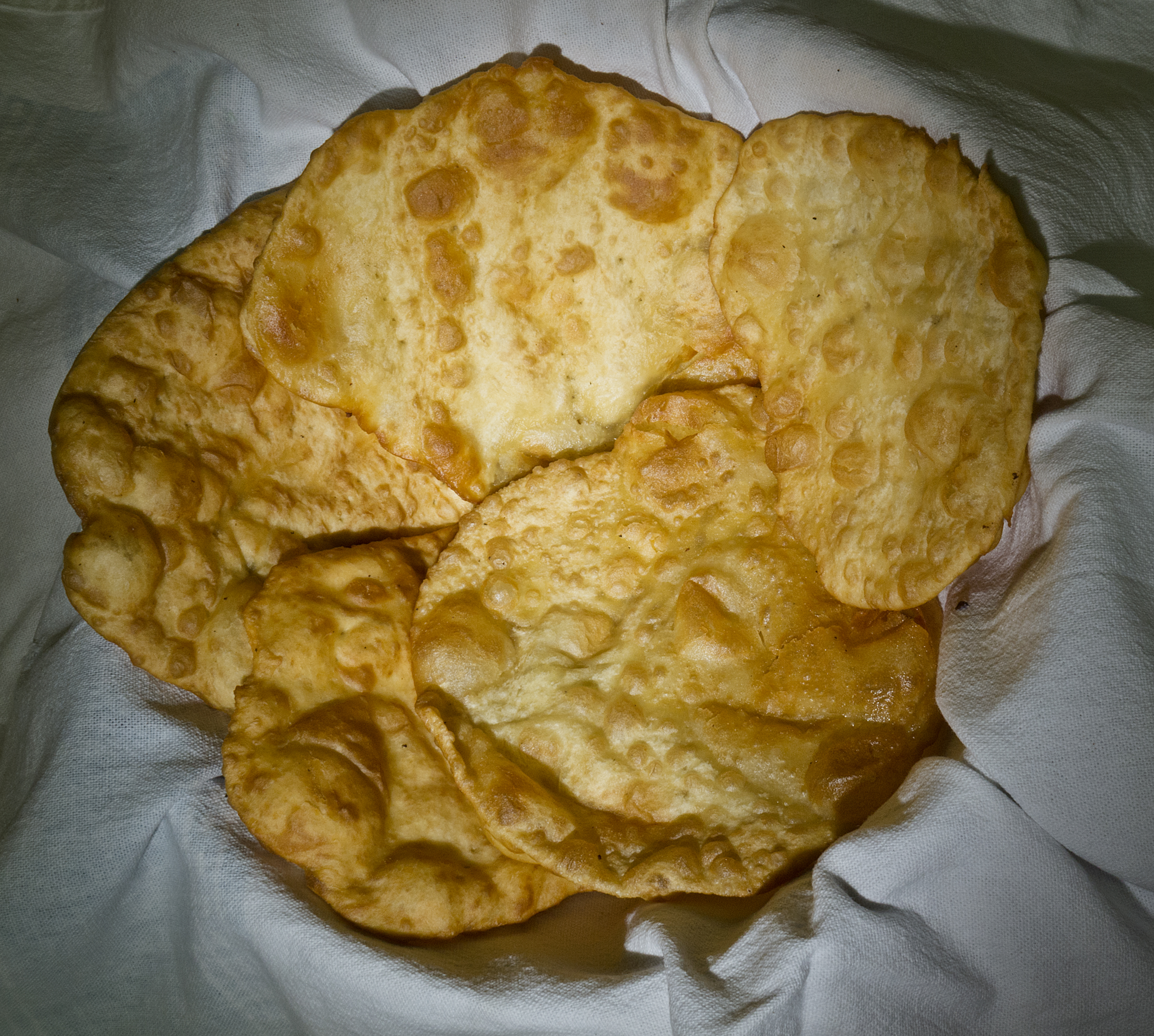
Yanikeiki, also called yaniqueques

=== Cocolo influence ===
Cocolo is a term used in the Spanish-speaking Caribbean to refer to non-Hispanic African descendants, or darker skin people in general. The term originated in the Dominican Republic, and was historically used to refer to the Anglophone and Francophone Caribbean descendants. The Cocolo cuisine brought over through various parts of the Caribbean have influenced Dominican cuisine. Some recipes have changed but most have stood the same but with different names.

- Dumplings – Dumplings in the Dominican Republic are eaten with braised meats or seasoned tomato sauce. They came from the British Caribbean mostly in and around San Pedro de Macorís. A simple recipe is based on all-purpose flour, water, and salt made into a thick dough before boiling. When cornmeal is added they are known as bollitos de maíz (boiled cornmeal dumplings).
- Guavaberry – Guavaberry is used to make jams and drinks. Guavaberry liqueur, which is made from rum, is a common Christmas drink on many of the islands, particularly in Sint Maarten and the Virgin Islands. The colonists from Denmark and Holland found it could flavor rum by infusion similar to infused schnapps. In the Dominican Republic it is associated with the eastern town of San Pedro de Macorís which has a large population of Eastern Caribbean descent.
- Yaniqueque – Jonnycakes, a dish brought by sugarcane workers from the Lesser Antilles over a century ago.
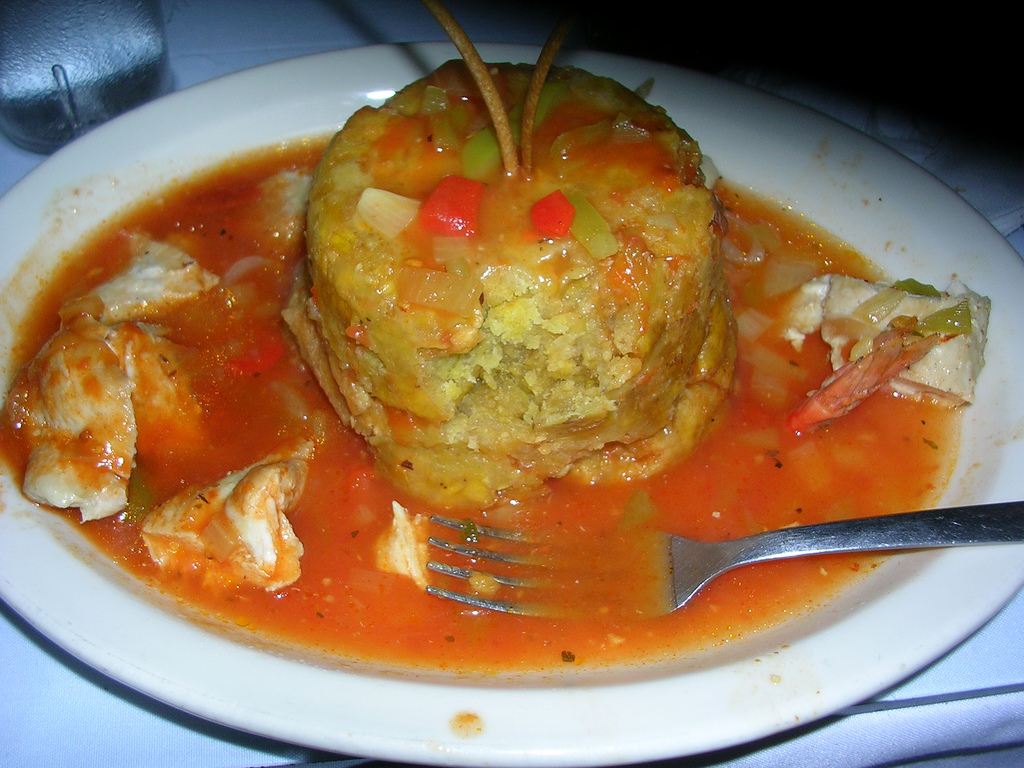
  Mofongo

=== Cuban and Puerto Rican influences ===
Dominican cuisine has adopted from Puerto Rico and Cuba, though the dish names differ sometimes. Because of the historic migration between Cuba, Dominican Republic, and Puerto Rico, its three cultures are closely related. It is unclear for most dishes between these countries on where it originated from. Dishes like mofongo and pasteles de hola originated from Puerto Rico, Moros y Cristianos and yuca con mojo from Cuba have become part of Dominican cuisines and culture.

- Majarete – Pudding made with blended corn, cornstarch, milk, vanilla, and cinnamon. This dessert is claimed by Cuba and Dominican Republic. The only difference is Dominicans add nutmeg while Cubans add lemon zest and raisins. Puerto Rico's first cookbook written in 1859 claims the dessert is of Dominican origin.
- Mofongo – Originally from Puerto Rico. It is made from fried, boiled or roasted plantains, cassave, or breadfruit mashed with chicharrón and seasoned typically with garlic, fat (olive oil, lard, or butter), and broth.
- Pasteles de hoja – Plantain and root tamales stuffed with meat has its origin in Puerto Rico and made its way to the Dominican Republic in the beginning of the 20th century.

=== Dominican dishes ===
- Arepitas – Shredded yuca or cornmeal fritters mixed with eggs, sugar, and anise seeds. Yuca arepitas also go by arañitas, "little spiders."
- Bollitos de yuca – The recipe is exact to carimañola.
- Catibía – Empanada dough made from tapioca flour.
- Chicharrón de pollo – This fried chicken dish also goes by pica pollo. Chicken is marinated in lime juice and coated with flour, garlic, and orégano. There are existing recipes with rum or soy sauce as a marine. It is served with tostones and lime.
- Chulitos – Fresh grated cassava filled with ground meat and fried.
- Chimichurris – The chimichurri is a burger topped with slaw made by Argentinean street vendors living in Santo Domingo. It is similar to Argentina sandwiches, in which meat is topped with chimichurri sauce and slaw.
- Spaghetti a la Dominicana – Spaghetti with Dominican salami eaten for breakfast, lunch, and dinner.
- Pico y pala – Chicken feet and necks are associated with popular dining rooms and cafeterias, very common in low income neighborhoods. Usually cooked with red onion, cilantro, culantro, oregano, and sugar.
- Guisados – Meat, fish, beans, or vegetables cooked in a tomato sauce base with Dominican-style sazón. Sazón in Dominican gastronomia depends on personal preferences and family traditions. Typically guisado are made with cubanelle peppers, red onions, garlic, oregano, sugar, cilantro, tomato paste, and sour orange juice. Other popular ingredient include culantro, bullion cube, and aji dulce. White rice is usually served alongside, Puerto Rican mofongo ralleno has gain popularity sense the 1980s. This is a popular staple in Dominican kitchens, and carnes guisadas are one of the components of the traditional Dominican lunch meal (la bandera). Carne mechada is braised tenderloin or flank. Braised oxtail and cow tongue are usually spicy using Scotch bonnet or other local chilies. Beans and vegetables are cooked the same but with no citrus added.
- Yaroa – Boiled mashed plantains or yuca layered with meat, melted cheese, with ketchup and mayonnaise on top. Sold on trucks.

=== Pastelón ===
Pastelón can be described as a casserole or shepherd's pie. A main element of Dominican cuisine. There are more than six variations in the Dominican Republic the most popular ones being pastelón de platano maduro (yellow plantain casserole) and pastelón de yuca (cassava casserole). Pastelón origins can be found in other Latin American Countries like Puerto Rico, Venezuela, Panama, and Cuba. Pastelón are usually stuffed with ground meat or chicken.

- Pastelón de arroz – Rice, meat, and cheese casserole.
- Pastelón de berenjena – Eggplant parmigiana.
- Pastelón de maíz – Tamale pie.
- Pastelón de plátano maduro – Sweet plantain casserole.
- Pastelón de papa – Shepherd's pie using Dominican spices.

=== Sauces ===
- Agrio de naranja – Sour orange juice steeped with oregano, garlic, and chilies. It is a concentrated pique sauce usually paired with soup.
- Wasakaka – Wasakaka varies depending on the recipe and the person making it. Some versions are closer to Cuban mojo (sauce), with a garlic-and-citrus flavor, while others resemble Puerto Rican hot sauce.

The name wasakaka became more prominent in the Dominican Republic during a period of increased Venezuelan migration. Venezuelans began migrating to the Dominican Republic in significant numbers around 2013, following the death of former Venezuelan president Hugo Chávez and the worsening economic and humanitarian crisis in Venezuela.

Although the name wasakaka may reflect Venezuelan culinary influence, the sauce itself may have roots in Cuban and Puerto Rican cuisine.

=== Breads ===
- Telera – Dominican bread similar to Mexican telera. Typically served on Christmas.
- Pan de agua.
- Pan de coco – Coconut bread shows up in many Central American cuisines and Caribbean cuisines particularly in Nicaragua, Venezuela, Honduras, Brazil, Colombia, Guatemala, Jamaica, Puerto Rico, and the Dominican Republic. Recipes are the same or similar but result in the same flavor and, most of the time, texture.
- Pan de mantequilla.

=== Soups ===
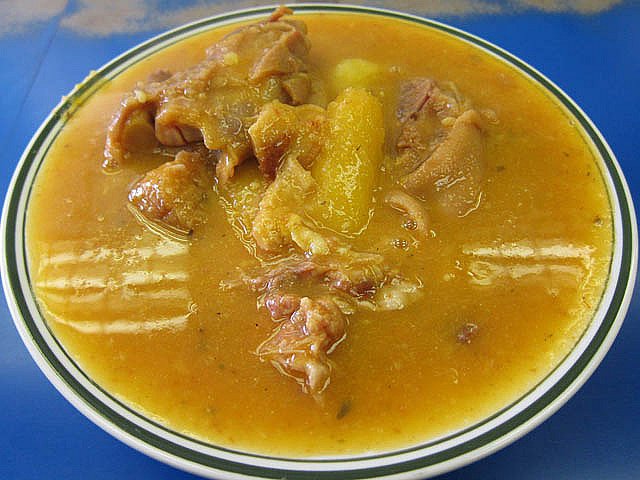
Mondongo beef tripe soup

- Aguají – Plantain puree soup seasoned with sofrito.
- Buche e perico – Corn chowder.
- Chambre or Chapea – Kidney beans or white beans, rice, pigeon peas, squash, longaniza (sausage), plantains, vegetables, tubers, and sofrito.
- Guandules de coco – Pigeon peas stewed in coconut milk, squash, and sofrito.
- Sancocho de guandules – Pigeon peas stewed with squash, sofrito, and pork.
- Sancocho de siete carnes – Seven meat stew is the Dominican Republicans national soup. If beans are added, it is known as sancocho de habichuela.
- Sopa de mondongo – Beef tripe soup.

=== Rice ===
Most dishes in the Dominican Republic are served with long-grain rice, a staple of the Dominican cuisine.

- Arroz blanco – White rice. This basic rice can be served with stew beans, braised meat, or soups.
- Arroz con maíz or moro de maíz – Rice with corn combines the sweet flavor of corn with the salty flavor of rice cooked with red onions, orégano, and cilantro.
- Chofan – Although it is referred to as "Dominican fried rice" there has been no change to its Asian origin besides adding Dominican orégano.
- Concón – The layer of burnt hard oily rice left behind when cooking in a caldero (iron pot).
- Locrio – Classic style of mixing rice with meat or seafood.
- Moro de guandules con coco – Rice, pigeon peas (guandules), sofrito, and coconut milk dish served for Christmas.
- Moro de habichuela – Rice cooked with beans and sofrito in the same pot.

== Desserts ==
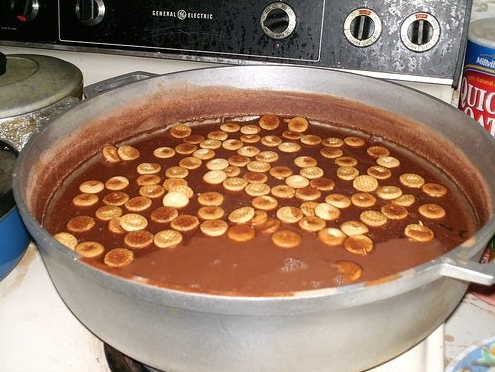
Habichuela con dulce garnished with milk cookies (galletas de leche)

Dominican desserts include flan, puddings, and tropical fruit-based sweets. Dulce de coco (coconut fudge), dulce de leche (caramelized milk), and majarete (cornmeal pudding) are also common Dominican desserts. Dominican puddings are often made with bread, sweet potato, or rice. White vanilla or clear vanilla is an artificial flavoring or vanilla that very popular in Dominican gastronomy. Artificial clear vanilla is widely used in Dominican baking and is often preferred over natural vanilla extract in many traditional desserts.

Many Dominicans bring back white vanilla from Dominican Republic to flavor their traditional dessert overseas. Cassia cinnamon is a key ingredient in many Dominican desserts.

- Almibar de frutas – Fruit cooked in syrup. The most popular is called mala rabia. Guava, sweet plantains, and sweet potato with cinnamon.
- Arepa – Cornmeal cooked with milk, raisins, sugar, cinnamon, and coconut milk. The batter is then cooked a second time on a stove top with banana leaves. When done it resembles a cake. Dominican arepa is different from that of the Venezuelan and Colombian arepa.
- Arroz con leche - Rice pudding dessert brought over by the Spanish. Made with raisins, milk, sugar, cinnamon, nutmeg, and vanilla. Lemon peel, star anis, and clove are also in some family recipes.
- Bizcocho Dominicano – Dominican cake filled with pineapple jam and frosted with meringue.
- Brazo gitano – Rolled sponge cake with guava filling. A dessert from Spain.
- Canquiña
- Dulce de coco tierno – Shredded coconut made with milk, sugar, and cinnamon.
- Dulce de leche
- Dulce de leche en tabla – Milk fudge.
- Flan - a dessert popular throughout Latin American brought over by the Portuguese and Spanish.
- Habichuelas con dulce – Sweet creamed red beans dessert. Made with coconut milk, raisins, sweet potato chunks, cinnamon, clove, garnish with milk cookies (galletas de leche) or casabe (cassava flat bread).
- Jalea de batata – Cinnamon, coconut milk and sweet potato pudding.
- Jalao - Coconut macaroons made with honey and ginger.
- Palitos de coco – lollipop coconut macaroon covered in red dye corn syrup.
- Tres leches cake - A sponge cake brought over from South American. Very popular in Latin American, USA, and other parts of the world the world

== Beverages ==
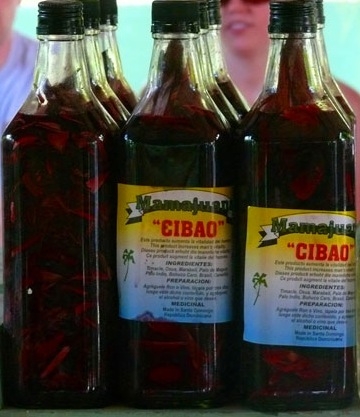
Bottles of mamajuana

The most popular drinks in the Dominican Republic are rum locally known as romo, beer (especially Presidente), coffee, ponche crema, local fruit smoothies, mabí juice made from colubrina bark or fruit that's done all over the Caribbean. Alcohol drinks such as piña colada, coquito, Cuba libre, and mojitos from Cuba and Puerto Rico.

- Batidas – Dominican version of smoothies often made with tropical fruits such as papaya and sapodilla.
- Chocolate de maní – Peanut milk is a drink that originated in South America. Modern recipes add spices, sugar, corn, milk, and rum. It is popular throughout the English speaking Caribbean where it is known as peanut punch.
- Mama Juana – an alcoholic drink concocted by allowing rum, red wine, and honey to soak in a bottle with tree bark and herbs.
- Jugo de avena – A spiced oatmeal drink popular throughout South America and the Caribbean.
- Morir Soñando – Evaporated milk, sugar, orange juice, and sometimes added vanilla and lime juice.

== Geographical differences ==
What Dominicans tend to eat depends highly on where they live: whether near the sea or in the interior mountains. In either case, most Dominican meat dishes tend to involve pork, as pigs are farmed quite heavily on the island. Meat dishes tend to be very well cooked or even stewed in Dominican restaurants, a tradition stemming from the lesser availability of refrigeration on the island.

Seaside Dominican fishing villages will have great varieties of seafood, the most common being shrimp, marlin, mahi-mahi or dorado, and lobster. Most villagers more commonly dine on cheap, lesser-quality fish, usually stewed with la criolla, a type of rice. Premium seafood tends to be too expensive for the many locals, and is saved for the island's upper class and the tourist resorts.

Differences between Dominican cuisine and those of other parts of the West Indies include the milder spicing, which mainly uses red onions, garlic, cilantro, cilantro ancho (culantro), ají cubanela (cubanelle pepper), and lippia micromera (a.k.a. oregano). Dominican sofrito is known as sazón.
