= A. vinifera =

A. vinifera may refer to:

- Acrocomia vinifera, a synonym forAcrocomia aculeata, a palm tree species native to Mexico, Paraguay and Argentina
- Aeria vinifera, a synonym for Pseudophoenix vinifera, a palm tree species endemic to Hispaniola

== See also ==
- Vinifera (disambiguation)
