= P. vinifera =

P. vinifera may refer to:

- Pulvinaria vinifera, a scale insect species in the genus Pulvinaria
- Pseudophoenix vinifera, a palm species

== See also ==
- Vinifera (disambiguation)
