= Mauby =

Tree bark-based beverage from the Caribbean

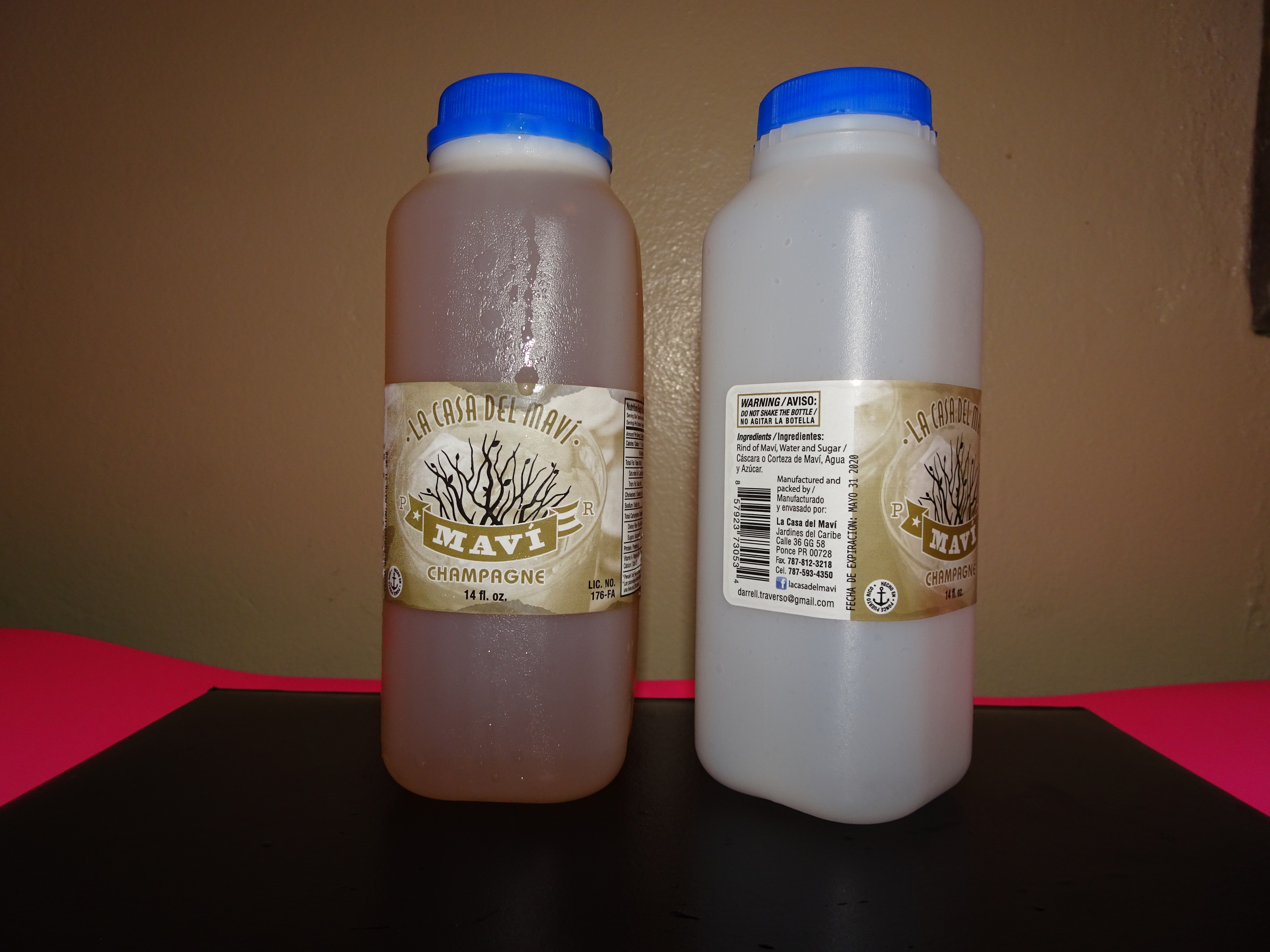
- Maví bottles from Ponce, Puerto Rico; left bottle has mabí, the right one is empty
- Type: Tree bark-based beverage
- Other name(s): madi, maví, mobi, mabi and maubi
- Origin: Developed from a mixture of indigenous Taíno and Carib people, African, and European influences, Caribbean, West Indies
- Introduced: 18th century
- Flavour: Woody and herbal with a sharp, sweet and bitter aftertaste
- Ingredients: Mauby bark (Colubrina elliptica and Colubrina arborescens tree), cinnamon sticks, cloves, aniseed or star anise (Illicium verum), dried orange peel, water, and brown sugar

Mauby, also known as madi, maví, mobi, mabi and maubi, is a tree bark-based beverage grown, and widely consumed, in the Caribbean. It is made with sugar and the bark and/or fruit of certain species in the genus Colubrina including Colubrina elliptica and Colubrina arborescens, a small tree native to the northern Caribbean and south Florida. Recipes usually include other ingredients as well, spices such as aniseed being very common. Mauby was traditionally a fermented beverage made in small batches, but is now predominantly a commercial non-fermented soft drink.

It is often bought as a pre-made syrup and then mixed with water (sparkling or still) to the consumer's taste, but many make it themselves at home or purchase it from neighbourhood producers or street sellers. The mauby has been known to cause an initial laxative reaction unexpected to many first-time drinkers. Its taste is initially sweet, somewhat like root beer or sarsaparilla, but changes to a prolonged, but not astringent bitter aftertaste.

== Etymology ==
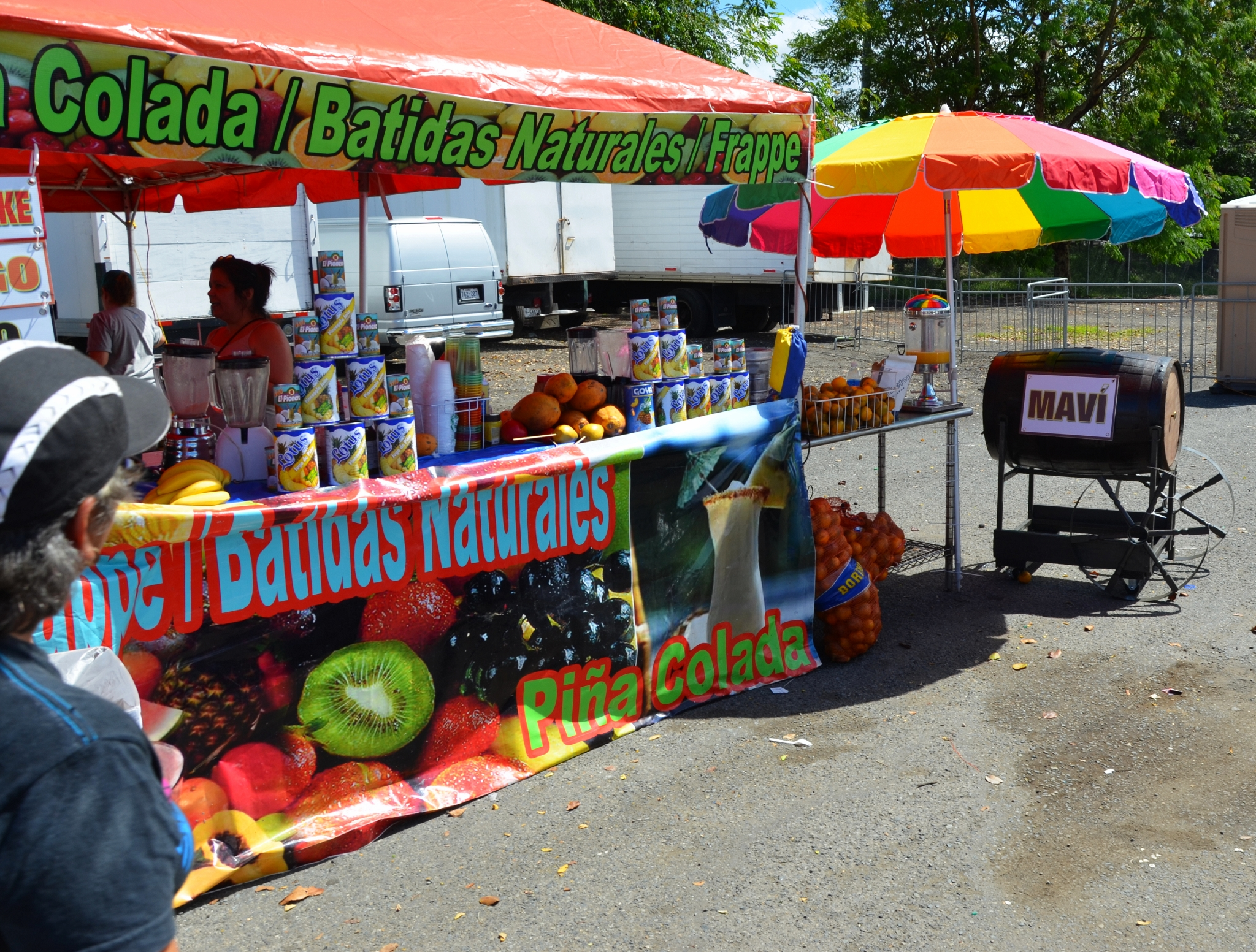
Fruit stand selling mavi at a car show in Puerto Rico

The drink is known by variations of its name: mauby in Barbados as well as Trinidad and Tobago, mavi in Puerto Rico, and mabi in Haiti and the Dominican Republic. Generally, mauby in the English Caribbean, mavi in the Spanish Caribbean, and mabi in the French Caribbean. In Puerto Rico, the drink is also called mavi champán (champagne mauby) because the drink is fermented, causing it to foam.

== Origin and history ==
Since before the colonial times, mauby bark, or its tree bark (natives to several West Indies Isles), has been consumed by Caribbean natives for numerous social rituals. Mauby bark is folk medicine among the Caribbean indigenous to treat ailments such as arthritis and high cholesterol, as well as for aphrodisiac. The current non-alcoholic drink originated from the indigenous Taíno and Carib fermented alcoholic beverage, where it was adopted by European settlers in the Caribbean and shaped from a mixture of indigenous, African, and European influences. The tree bark was already part of the traditions of the indigenous, and the enslaved Africans' knowledge of plants and their fermentation techniques were further added in the shaping of the current drink. English colonist and writer Richard Ligon wrote in his memoir in 1657 that Barbados women made mobbie from red sweet potatoes, although sugar plantations within the colony provided a huge supply to combine with the bark. A fermented version of mauby was develop using tree bark instead of sweet potato by British colonists in Barbados in the 1700s and 1800s, as a replacement for alcoholic beverages from England. Although this was soon replaced by alcohol among the British, the Africans continue to produce the drink, even after the British began to replace it with their alcohol from home.

== Preparation ==
Haiti and the Dominican Republic are two of the largest Caribbean exporters of the bark and leaves. Often the drink is fermented using a portion of the previous batch, while sometimes it is consumed unfermented. In Puerto Rico, the mauby is made by mixing an older batch with a new batch with the Mauby bark and leaves are boiled with ginger, avocado leaves, brown sugar and other spices with ginger has a significant role in the fermentation process. The drink is then placed in a tight sealed bottle and left out in the sun for 6–8 hours before being placed in a dark cool place left to ferment up to a week.

== Commercial soft drinks ==
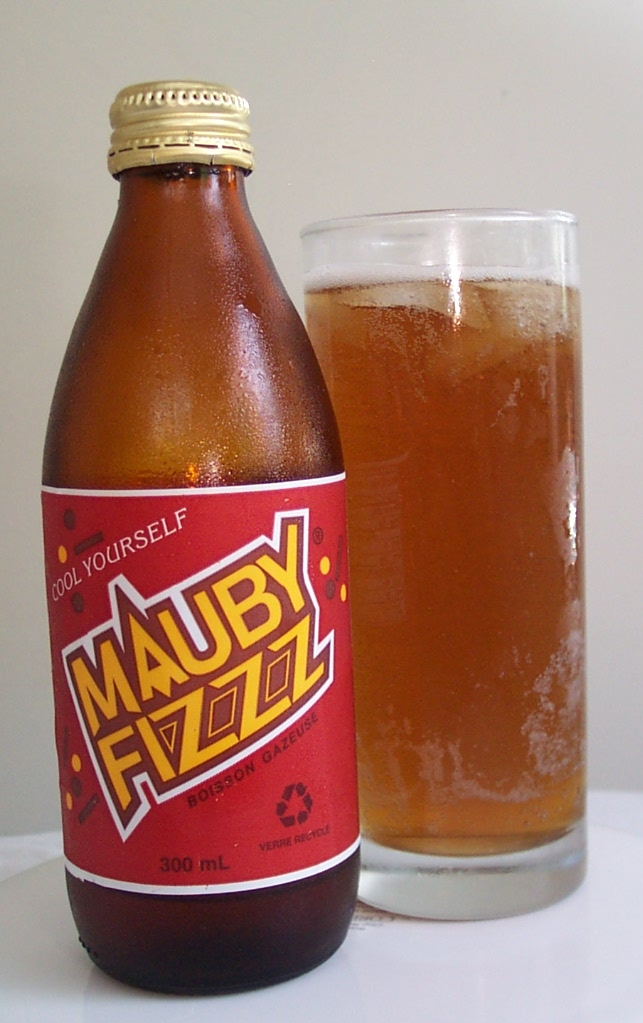
A bottle of Mauby Fizzz produced by PepsiCo

There was also a variant of soft drink made from the drink. Grupo Taino LLC of the Dominican Republic markets two commercial versions of mabi, both made with carbonated water. Seybano is lighter in colour and made from tree bark extract and white and brown sugar, while Cacheo is darker and made from both bark and fruit extract, with spices and brown sugar. Contrary to its name, Mabi Cacheo does not include sap from the Cacheo palms (Pseudophoenix ekmanii and P. vinifera).

Mauby Fizzz is a commercially produced, unfermented and carbonated version of the drink produced in Trinidad and Tobago by multinational PepsiCo from mauby bark. A similar version is also produced in Saint Vincent and the Grenadines called Hairoun Mauby, produced by St. Vincent Brewery Limited, a company in the AmBev portfolio.
