= C. greggii =

C. greggii may refer to:

- Ceanothus greggii
- Colubrina greggii

== See also ==
- Greggii
