= Chimi =

Chimi may refer to:

== Foods ==
- Chimi burger, a sandwich from the Dominican Republic
- Chimichanga, a deep-fried burrito
- Chimichurri, a condiment made using parsley

== Other uses ==
- Chimi Eyewear, a Swedish-based eyewear brand
