= Frumex =

Frumex may refer to:

- Frumex Corporation, producers of a commercial version of the traditional Mexican drink Tepache
- a trade name for the loop diuretic medication known generically as Furosemide
