= Wine palm =

Wine palm is a common name for several palm species and may refer to:

- Borassus flabellifer, a palm species of tropical Asia
- Caryota urens, a palm species of tropical Asia
- Pseudophoenix vinifera, a palm species endemic to Hispaniola
