= Colubrina pedunculata =

Scientific classification
- Kingdom: Plantae
- Clade: Tracheophytes
- Clade: Angiosperms
- Clade: Eudicots
- Clade: Rosids
- Order: Rosales
- Family: Rhamnaceae
- Genus: Colubrina
- Species: C. pedunculata

Binomial name
- Colubrina pedunculata Baker f.

Species of flowering plant

Colubrina pedunculata is a shrub in the family Rhamnaceae. It is endemic to Christmas Island, an Australian territory in the north-eastern Indian Ocean. Its specific epithet comes from the Latin pedunculatus, referring to the long and conspicuous peduncle of the inflorescence.

== Description ==
Colubrina pedunculata is a thorny, sometimes straggling, shrub or small tree. Its thorns are 5–20 mm long. Its leaves are alternate, narrowly elliptic, and deciduous after fruiting. It bears many yellow-green flowers, 5–6 mm across and clustered. The fruit is about 7 mm long.

== Distribution and habitat ==
Found only on Christmas Island, the plant is common on the northern and north-eastern terraces, in areas of poor, dry soil, among limestone pinnacles and scree, and in cliff edge thickets.

== Relationships ==
Since it is closely related to the widespread C. asiatica (L.) Brongn., the fruit of which is used as a fish toxin, and the leaves of which are used medicinally to treat skin diseases, similar chemical or pharmacological properties may be expected in C. pedunculata.
