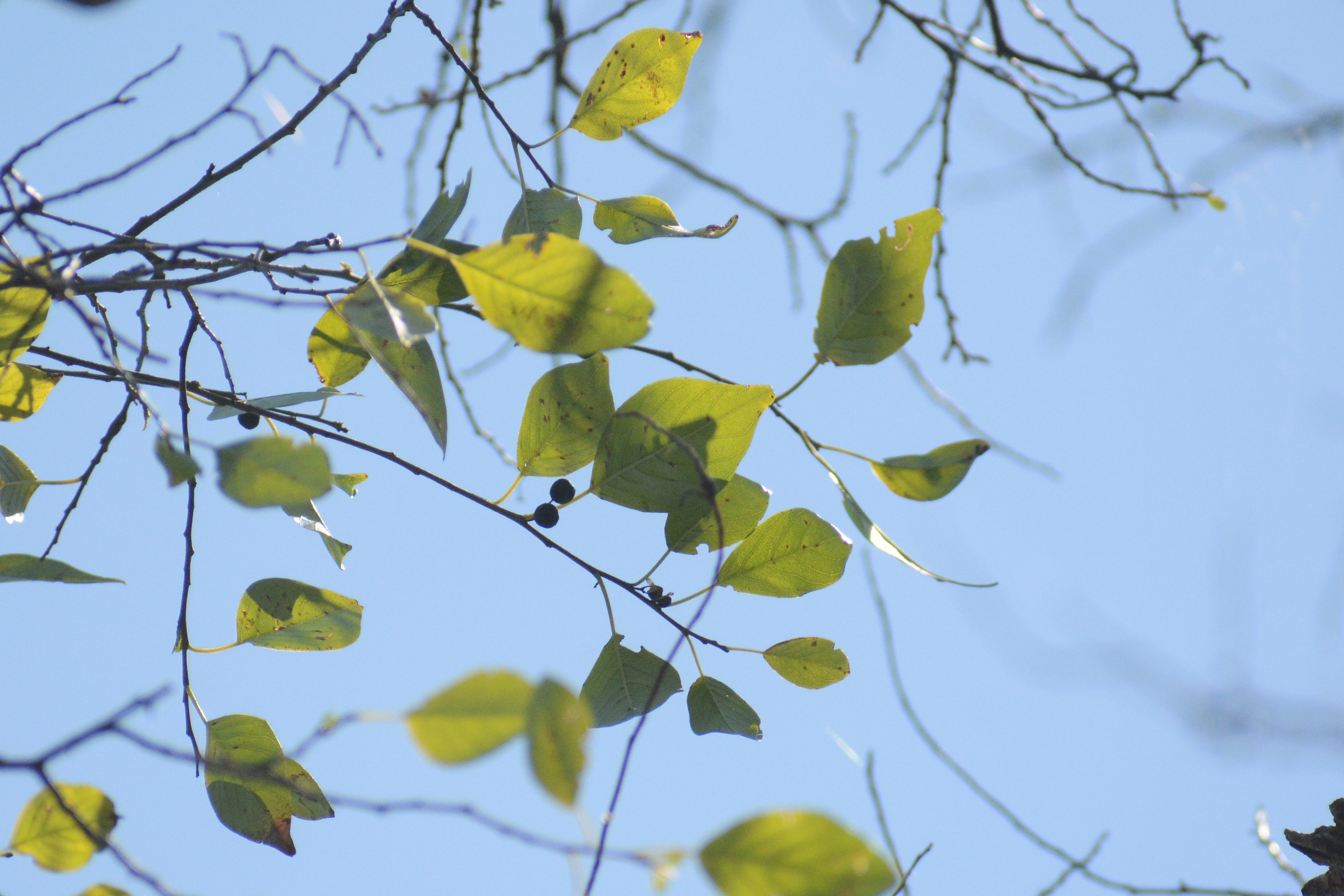
- Leaves and fruit in Florida

Conservation status
- Least Concern (IUCN 3.1)

- Apparently Secure (NatureServe)

Scientific classification
- Kingdom: Plantae
- Clade: Tracheophytes
- Clade: Angiosperms
- Clade: Eudicots
- Clade: Rosids
- Order: Rosales
- Family: Rhamnaceae
- Genus: Colubrina
- Species: C. elliptica

Binomial name
- Colubrina elliptica (Sw.) Brizicky & W.L. Stern

= Colubrina elliptica =

Species of plant

Colubrina elliptica, also known as mabi or soldierwood, is a species of flowering tree in the family Rhamnaceae that is native to the Florida Keys, the Caribbean, Central America, Mexico, and Venezuela.

== Description ==
It produces fruit the size of peppercorns; when ripe, the fruits explode, shooting their seeds several feet away and making explosions that sound like rounds of musket fire, hence the name "soldierwood". It is also called "nakedwood", due to its smooth bark with peels. The tree can grow very large, with a trunk circumference as large as 33 inches, a height of 47 feet tall, and with a tree crown spread 26 feet according to the American Forests Register of Champion Trees.

== Ecology ==
This tree is recognized for its size and also for the critical ecosystem services that it provides, such as food and shelter for wildlife, its water purification abilities, and its role in absorbing CO_{2} from the atmosphere and storing carbon in its wood.

== Uses ==
Colubrina elliptica is a saponin-containing plant widely distributed in the Caribbean region, where its bark is used for the preparation of bitter beverages and in folk medicine for the treatment of skin diseases. The bark and leaves of mabi are used to create mauby, a drink popular in the Caribbean.

== Chemistry ==
In recent years, three new bitter saponins, designated mabioside A, B and C, were isolated from the bark of Colubrina elliptica and were determined to be 3-O-[alpha-JL-rhamnopyranosyl-(1 → 6)-beta-D-glucopyranosyl]-15-O-[beta-D-glucopyranosyl] mabiogenin, 3-O-{alpha-L-rhamnopyranosyl-(1 → 6)-[beta-D-glucopyranosyl-(1 → 2)]-beta-D-glucopyranosyl} mabiogenin and 3-O-[alpha-L-rhamnopyranosyl-(1 → 6)-beta-D-glucopyranosyl] mabiogenin, respectively.
