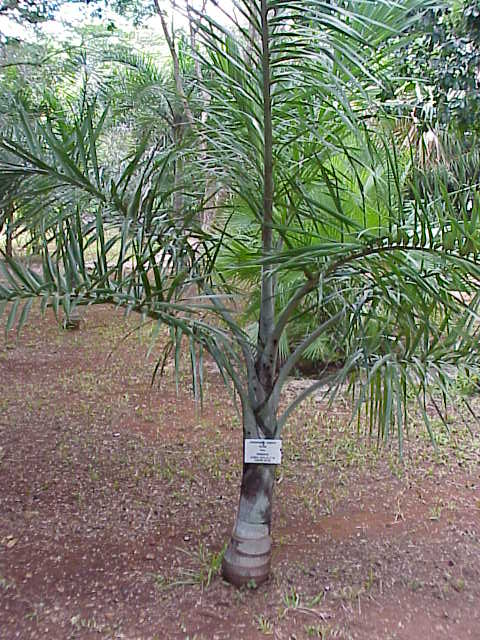
- Pseudophoenix sargentii

Scientific classification
- Kingdom: Plantae
- Clade: Tracheophytes
- Clade: Angiosperms
- Clade: Monocots
- Clade: Commelinids
- Order: Arecales
- Family: Arecaceae
- Subfamily: Ceroxyloideae
- Tribe: Cyclospatheae; O.F.Cook
- Genus: Pseudophoenix; H.Wendl. ex Sarg.

Species
- Pseudophoenix ekmanii; Pseudophoenix lediniana; Pseudophoenix sargentii; Pseudophoenix vinifera

Synonyms
- Sargentia H.Wendl. & Drude ex Salomon; Cyclospathe O.F.Cook; Chamaephoenix H.Wendl. ex Curtiss

= Pseudophoenix =

Genus of palms

Pseudophoenix is a genus of palms which is native to the wider Caribbean. Three species of the four species are endemic to Hispaniola, while the fourth, P. sargentii, is widely distributed in the northern Caribbean (Greater Antilles, Windward Islands, Bahamas), Florida, and the Yucatán Peninsula (Belize and southeastern Mexico).

Trees in this genus are medium to large palms with single, unclustered trunks. They lack spines and have pinnately compound leaves. Flowers are green and bisexual; the ripe fruit are red.

== Species ==
Image	Name	Distribution
	Pseudophoenix ekmanii	Barahona Peninsula and Isla Beata in the Dominican Republic
	Pseudophoenix lediniana	Tiburon Peninsula in southwestern Haiti.
	Pseudophoenix sargentii	Northern Caribbean, eastern Mexico, and extreme southeast Atlantic Florida.
	Pseudophoenix vinifera	Hispaniola.
