= Ají caballero =

Variety of chili pepper

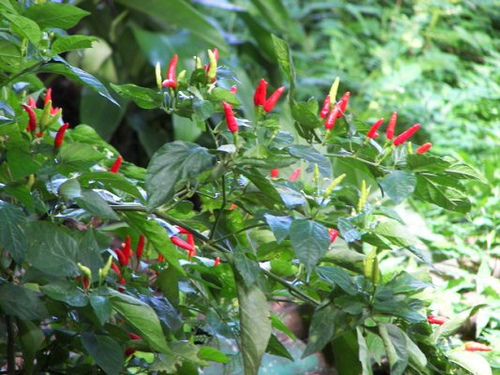
- Growing Ají caballero peppers
- Genus: Capsicum

The Ají caballero, or gentleman pepper, is a scarce hot chili pepper used as the basis of some Puerto Rican condiments, such as the Pique sauce.

The fruit of this plant stands vertically, unlike other peppers that hang down from the branches. The plant grows to a height of approximately 3–4 feet.
