= Colubrina beccariana =

Conservation status
- Least Concern (IUCN 3.1)

Scientific classification
- Kingdom: Plantae
- Clade: Tracheophytes
- Clade: Angiosperms
- Clade: Eudicots
- Clade: Rosids
- Order: Rosales
- Family: Rhamnaceae
- Genus: Colubrina
- Species: C. beccariana

Binomial name
- Colubrina beccariana Warb.

Synonyms
- Colubrina anomala King

Species of tree

Colubrina beccariana is a tree of tropical Asia in the family Rhamnaceae. It is named for the Italian botanist Odoardo Beccari.

== Description ==
Colubrina beccariana grows as a tree up to 25 metres (80 ft) tall with a trunk diameter of up to 50 cm (20 in). Its brown bark is smooth to dimpled. The roundish fruits measure up to 1.6 cm (1 in) long.

== Distribution and habitat ==
Colubrina beccariana grows naturally in Peninsular Malaysia and Borneo. Its habitat is lowland rainforest.
