= Pastelón =

Puerto Rican and Dominican casserole

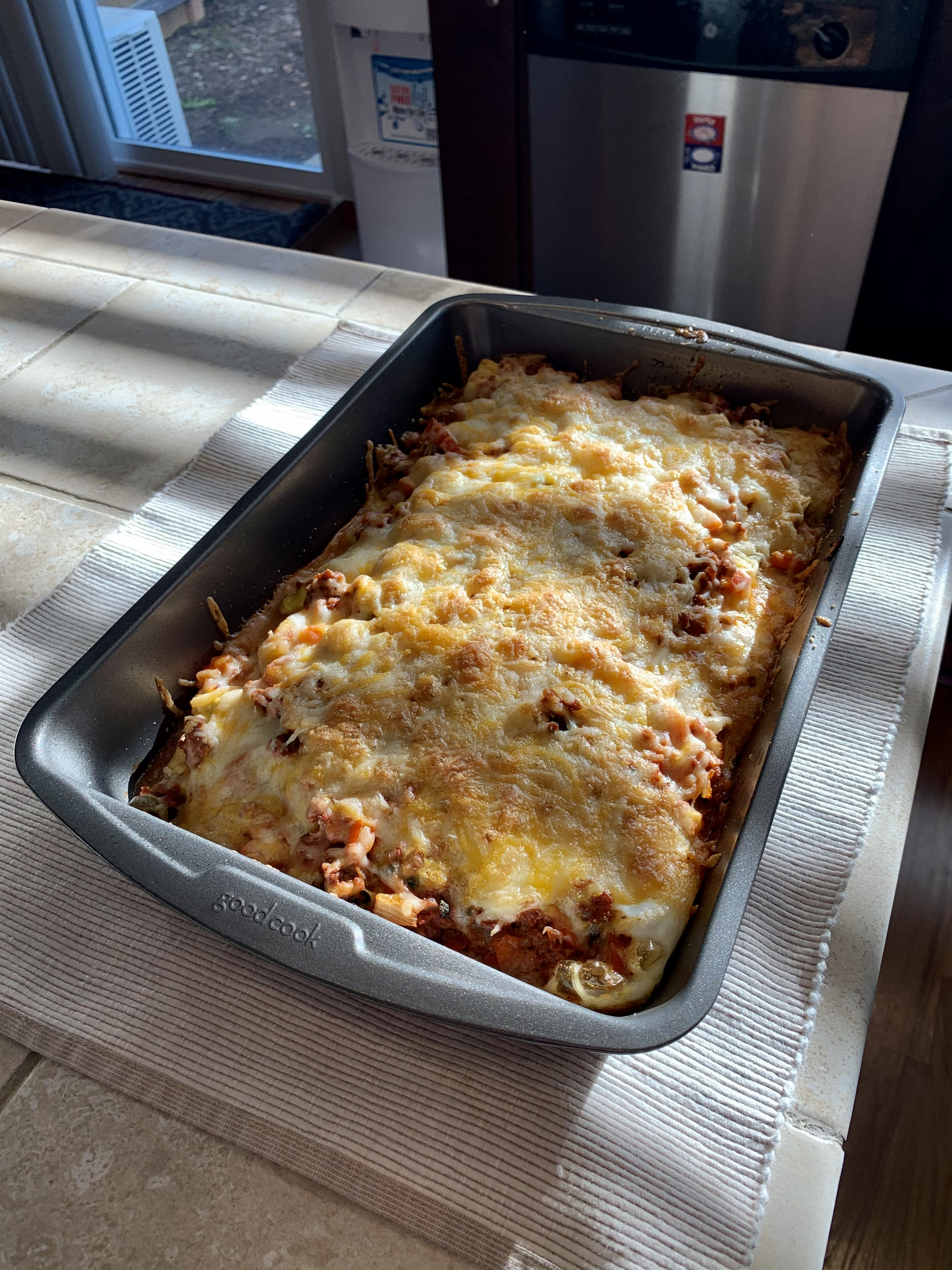
- Pastelón
- Alternative names: Piñón
- Course: Main course
- Place of origin: Dominican Republic; Puerto Rico
- Serving temperature: Hot

Pastelón (Spanish for "big cake") is a dish from the Dominican Republic and Puerto Rico. It is prepared differently in each Caribbean nation.

== Ingredients and preparation ==
The pastelón is a casserole dish consisting of typical Latin Caribbean foods such as plantains, sofrito, and seasoned, mince meat (beef).

== Dominican Republic ==
In the Dominican Republic, this dish is made with boiled mashed ripe plantains. The dish is often called Dominican casserole or ripe plantain casserole, using typically Dominican style picadillo and cheddar cheese. A layer of mashed plantain is placed at the bottom of a baking pan and covered with picadillo and cheddar. Another layer of mashed plantain is placed on top with picadillo and cheddar. The dish is then covered with aluminum and baked for an additional 35-45 minutes.

== Puerto Rico ==
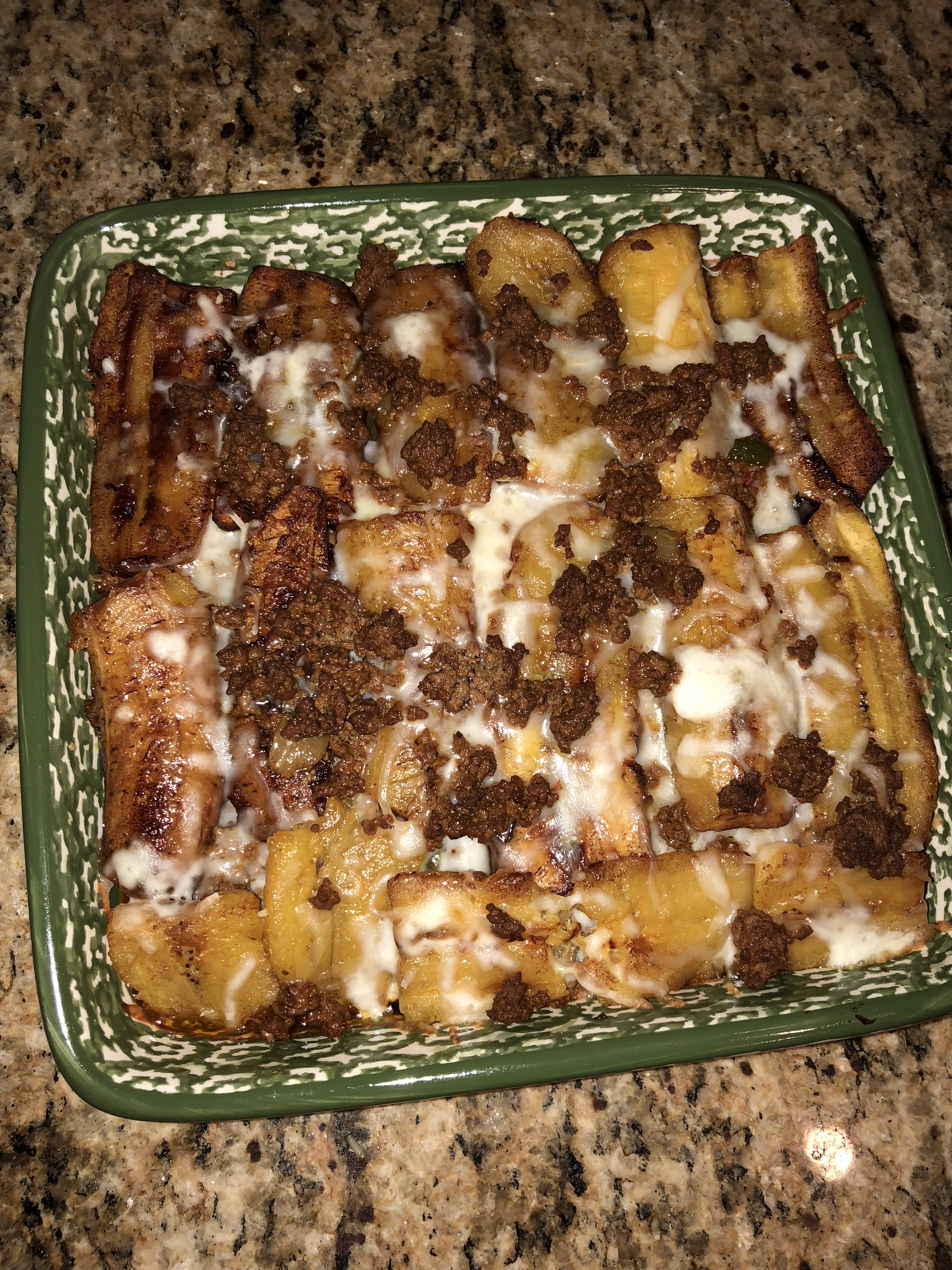
A version of pastelón prepared with sweet plantains, ground beef, tomato-based sauce and cheese.

In Puerto Rico, pastelón is considered a Puerto Rican variation of lasagne and inspired by such. Sweet plantains (plátanos maduros) replace the lasagne pasta noodles. The plantains are peeled and then cut lengthwise in to strips, which are then fried. Traditional pastelón is made with stewed ground meat (traditionally picadillo) because the sauce of the stew is then used between layers. In modern variations, the minced meat is sautéed with most notably bell peppers, tomatoes, onions, herbs, olives, capers, raisins, garlic, and wine. Plantains are then placed at the bottom of a baking pan layered with meat filling (mozzarella, ricotta, bechamel, or marinara are incorporated in modern variations, because if the meat is sauteed instead of stewed, it is drier). This is then repeated about two more times making layers just like a lasagne, but on the traditional pastelón some people would pour a beaten egg on the top layer before adding parmesan and the shredded mozzarella or cheddar or both. It is then baked.

Plantains can be replaced with boiled and mashed potato, batata, breadfruit, cassava, celeriac (apio), taro, ñame, or yautía.

A modern vegetarian variation of pastelón is popular recently as well replacing meat with mushrooms, eggplant, squash, string beans, potato or chayote.
