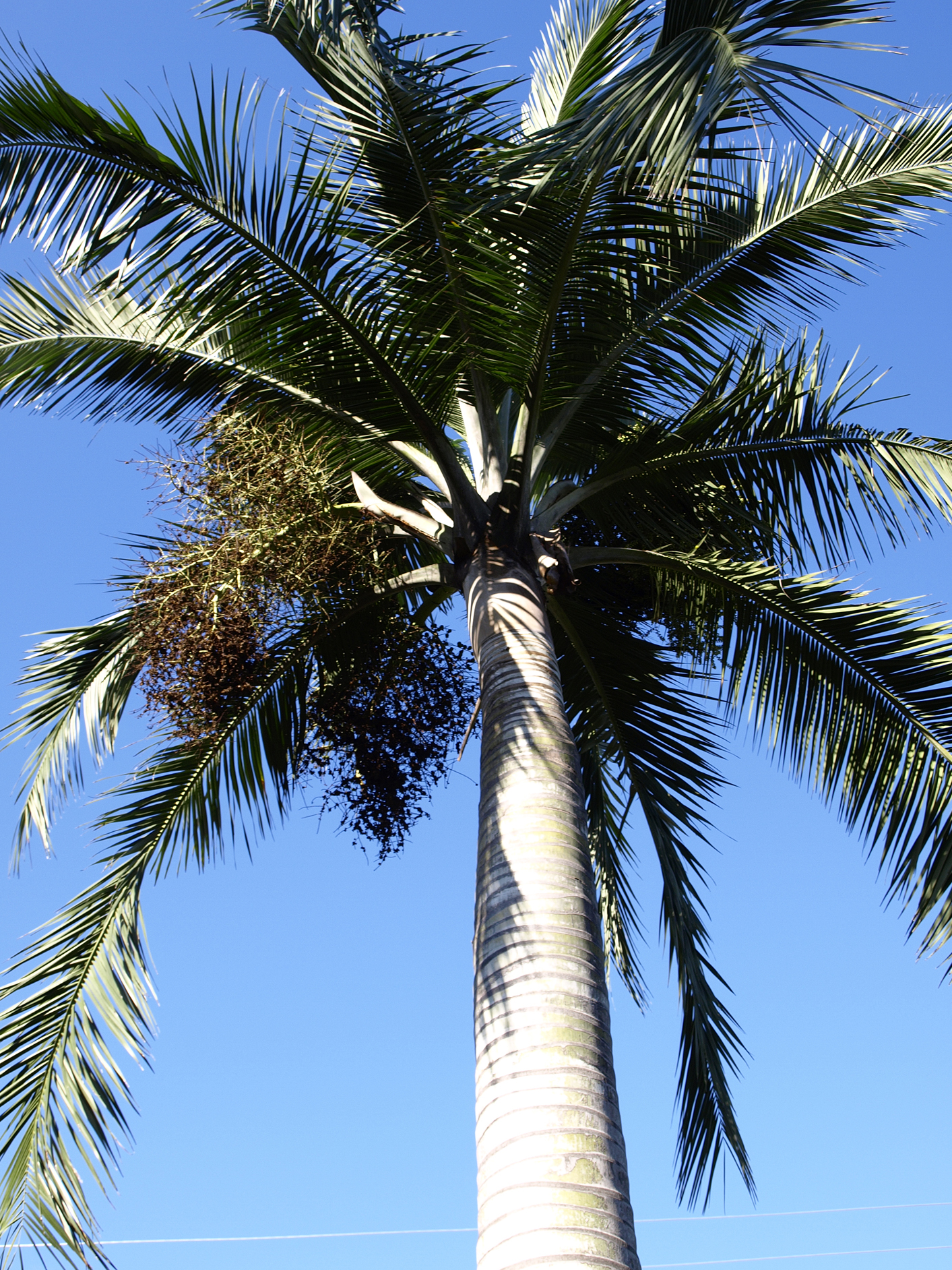

Conservation status
- Critically Endangered (IUCN 3.1)

Scientific classification
- Kingdom: Plantae
- Clade: Tracheophytes
- Clade: Angiosperms
- Clade: Monocots
- Clade: Commelinids
- Order: Arecales
- Family: Arecaceae
- Genus: Pseudophoenix
- Species: P. lediniana

Binomial name
- Pseudophoenix lediniana Read

= Pseudophoenix lediniana =

Species of palm endemic to Haiti

Pseudophoenix lediniana is a palm species endemic to the Tiburon Peninsula in southwestern Haiti.

== Taxonomy ==
The species was described and named by Robert William Read. This palm is named after Dr. R. Bruce Ledin, one of the founders of The Palm Society in Florida.

== Description ==
It is a medium-sized tree, 10–20 metres tall, with pinnately compound leaves and solitary stems slightly swollen at the base.

== Conservation ==
Pseudophoenix lediniana is rare in the wild, being found in only a single location.
