= Colubrina nicholsonii =

Conservation status
- Vulnerable (IUCN 3.1)

Scientific classification
- Kingdom: Plantae
- Clade: Tracheophytes
- Clade: Angiosperms
- Clade: Eudicots
- Clade: Rosids
- Order: Rosales
- Family: Rhamnaceae
- Genus: Colubrina
- Species: C. nicholsonii

Binomial name
- Colubrina nicholsonii Van Wyk & Schrire

Species of tree

Colubrina nicholsonii (Pondo weeping thorn, Afrikaans: Pondo-treurdoring) is a species of tree in the family Rhamnaceae. It is a protected species endemic to the Eastern Cape and KwaZulu-Natal provinces of South Africa. The plant grows in subpopulations in isolated gorges, usually of 10-20 and less than 50 individuals overhanging water. It is estimated that there are no more than 1,000 individuals in the wild.
