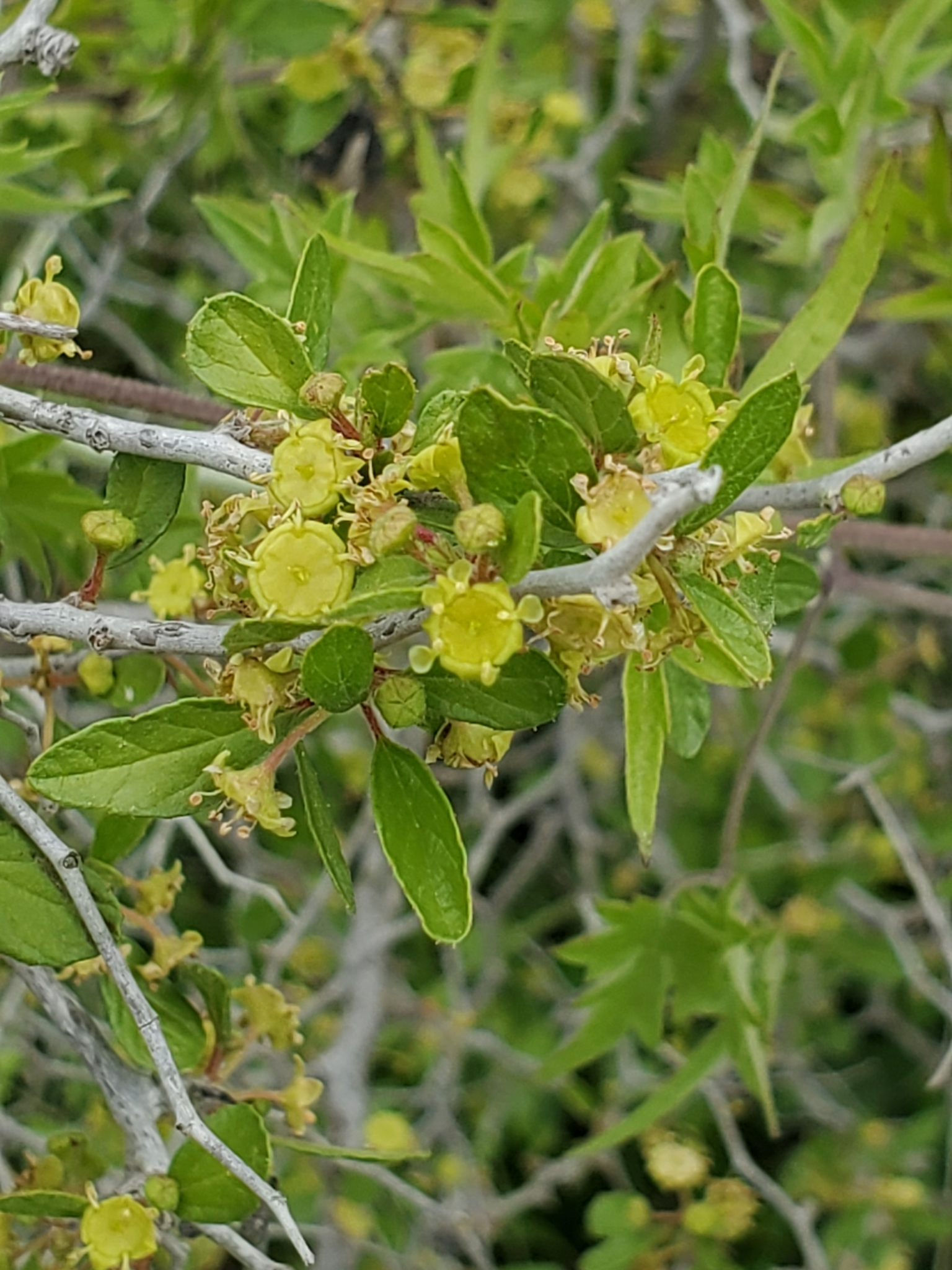
- Near the South Llano River

Scientific classification
- Kingdom: Plantae
- Clade: Tracheophytes
- Clade: Angiosperms
- Clade: Eudicots
- Clade: Rosids
- Order: Rosales
- Family: Rhamnaceae
- Genus: Colubrina
- Species: C. texensis

Binomial name
- Colubrina texensis (Torr. & A.Gray) A.Gray

Synonyms
- Rhamnus drummondii M.J.Young; Rhamnus texensis Torr. & A.Gray

= Colubrina texensis =

Species of plant

Colubrina texensis, the Texas snakewood or Texas hog plum, is a species of flowering plant in the family Rhamnaceae, native to Texas and northeastern Mexico. A 3 to 6 ft (0.9 to 1.8 m) deciduous shrub with zig-zagging branches and patterned bark, it is typically found growing in dry, poor soils.
