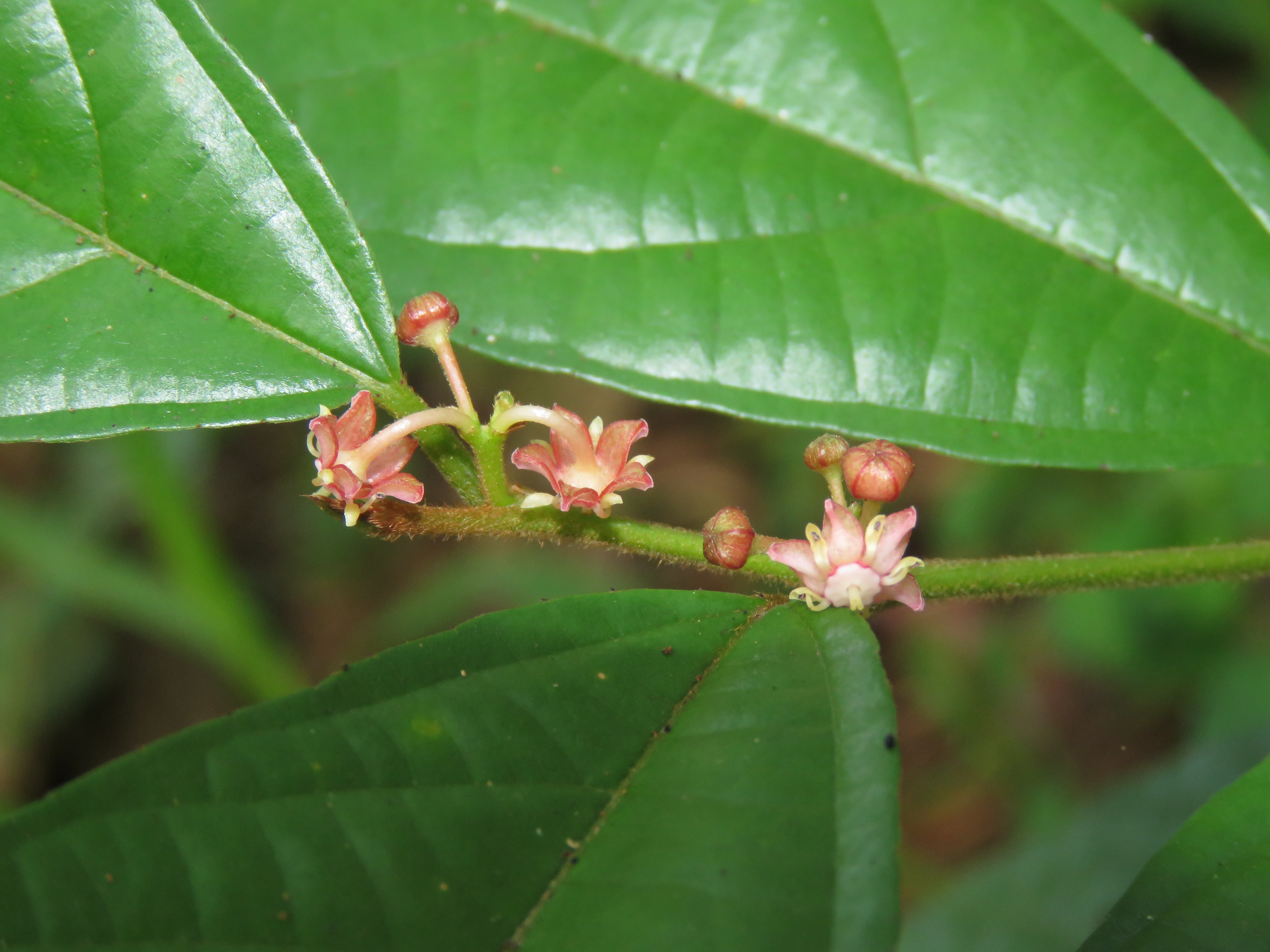

Conservation status
- Endangered (IUCN 3.1)

Scientific classification
- Kingdom: Plantae
- Clade: Tracheophytes
- Clade: Angiosperms
- Clade: Eudicots
- Clade: Rosids
- Order: Rosales
- Family: Rhamnaceae
- Genus: Colubrina
- Species: C. travancorica

Binomial name
- Colubrina travancorica Bedd.

= Colubrina travancorica =

Species of flowering plant

Colubrina travancorica is a species of flowering plant belonging to the family Rhamnaceae. It is a small tree that attains heights of up to 5–7 m.

== Description ==
The bark is dark brown. Leaves are alternate, dark green and shiny on the upper surface, and dull, paler green beneath. The flowers are small and reduced, orange to red in colour, each with a nectar disc, five sepals, five hooded petals, and five stamens. The fruit is a small, tri-carpellate, subglobose capsule.

== Range and habitat ==
Cynometra travancorica is native to the southern Western Ghats of southwestern India. it grows in lowland and hill evergreen tropical moist forests from 100 to 600 metres elevation, often in association with Vateria indica, Hopea parviflora, Bischofia javanica, and other species of trees.

Flowering and fruiting: November to March.
