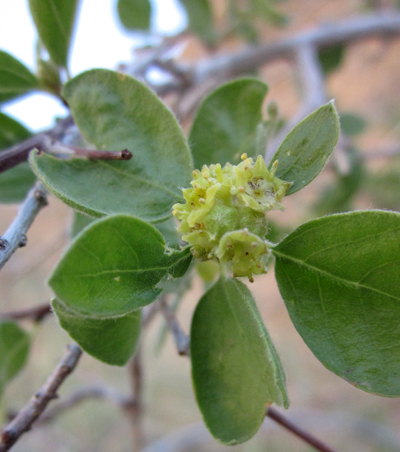

Conservation status
- Apparently Secure (NatureServe)

Scientific classification
- Kingdom: Plantae
- Clade: Tracheophytes
- Clade: Angiosperms
- Clade: Eudicots
- Clade: Rosids
- Order: Rosales
- Family: Rhamnaceae
- Genus: Colubrina
- Species: C. californica

Binomial name
- Colubrina californica I.M.Johnst.

= Colubrina californica =

Species of flowering plant

Colubrina californica, also known as Las Animas nakedwood, is a species of shrub in the family Rhamnaceae.

== Distribution and habitat ==
It is native to the Sonoran Desert of the southwestern United States (in California, Nevada, and Arizona) and northern Mexico, where it grows in desert scrub habitat.

== Description ==
The thorny shrub has deciduous leaves, oval in shape and coated in silky hairs. The inflorescence is a dense cluster of several tiny nectar-filled flowers. It blooms in April and May after the ground is moistened with rain.
