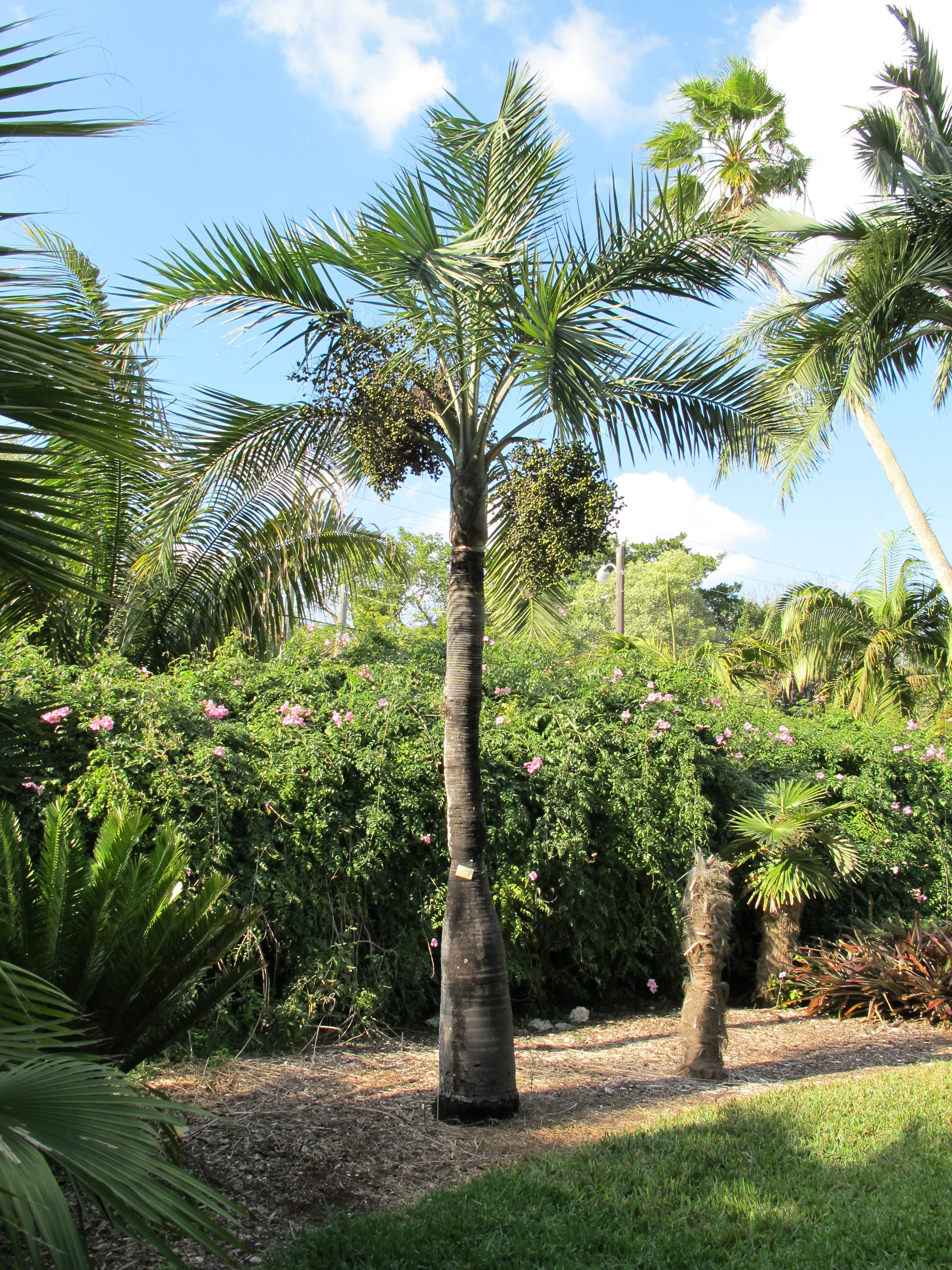

Conservation status
- Vulnerable (IUCN 3.1)

- Vulnerable (NatureServe)

Scientific classification
- Kingdom: Plantae
- Clade: Tracheophytes
- Clade: Angiosperms
- Clade: Monocots
- Clade: Commelinids
- Order: Arecales
- Family: Arecaceae
- Genus: Pseudophoenix
- Species: P. sargentii

Binomial name
- Pseudophoenix sargentii H.Wendl. ex Sarg.

= Pseudophoenix sargentii =

Species of palm

Pseudophoenix sargentii, commonly known as the Florida cherry palm or buccaneer palm, is a medium-sized palm native to the northern Caribbean, eastern Mexico, and extreme southeast Florida in the United States.

== Description ==
Pseudophoenix sargentii is usually near the sea on sandy or limestone soils. The palm grows in a ringed truck fashion to 8 metres tall and up to 30 centimetres in diameter, often slightly swollen. Yellowish flowers are spaced in loose clusters.

== Conservation ==
This species is thought to perhaps be secure in the wild, although little data exists on the abundance or distribution of its worldwide population. In Florida, this species is considered critically endangered. It was historically found only on Elliott Key, Long Key, and Sands Key in the Florida Keys. A large population from Long Key was destroyed in the early 20th century after they were dug and sold as ornamentals. Today, the only natural population remaining in Florida is on Elliott Key, consisting of less than 50 individuals. It is considered Vulnerable by both the IUCN and NatureServe. Populations in Haiti and nearby Navassa Island are thought to be extirpated.

== Cultivation ==
Pseudophoenix sargentii is a handsome palm and cultivated in the specialty horticulture trade and available as an ornamental palm for private gardens, habitat gardens, and various types of municipal, commercial, and agency sustainable landscape and restoration projects.
