= Colubrina greggii =

Conservation status
- Least Concern (IUCN 3.1)

- Secure (NatureServe)

Scientific classification
- Kingdom: Plantae
- Clade: Tracheophytes
- Clade: Angiosperms
- Clade: Eudicots
- Clade: Rosids
- Order: Rosales
- Family: Rhamnaceae
- Genus: Colubrina
- Species: C. greggii

Binomial name
- Colubrina greggii S.Watson

Species of tree

Colubrina greggii, commonly known as Sierra nakedwood or Gregg's colubrina, is a species of flowering plant in the family Rhamnaceae native to eastern Mexico, with a disjunct population in southern Texas in the United States.

== Etymology ==
The name honours American botanist Josiah Gregg (1806 – 1850), who collected the holotype near Monterrey, Nuevo León in 1848.

== Description ==
Colubrina greggii is a shrub 2–3 m in height or a small tree, reaching 5 m. Stems zigzag and are glabrate to loosely sericeous. Leaves are alternately arranged, simple, ovate to lanceolate-ovate or elliptic-ovate, and have finely toothed margins. The blades measure 6–18 cm in length and 3–8 cm in width. Petioles are 4–20 mm long. The inflorescence is a thyrse with 20-80 flowers. Peduncles measure 5–12 mm in length. The flowers are greenish-yellow, with stamens opposite the spoon-shaped petals. Flowering takes place in the spring or summer through fall. Fruiting pedicels are 5–10 mm in length. The fruit is a hard, globose capsule approximately 8–10 mm in diameter, on which calyx remnants form an equatorial ring. It is very similar to C. arborescens of southern Florida and the Caribbean, and herbarium specimens of the two species are difficult to distinguish.

== Habitat and range ==
C. greggii can be found in the states of Coahuila, Guanajuato, Hidalgo, Nuevo León, Queretaro, San Luis Potosi, Tamaulipas, and Veracruz in Mexico. In Texas, this species is restricted to the lower Rio Grande Valley, where it is associated with Sabal mexicana at 0–10 m (0–33 ft). In Queretaro and Guanajuato, C. greggii can be found in primary and secondary tropical dry forests, xeric shrublands, and oak forests from 300–1,600 m (980–5,250 ft).

== Systematics ==
Colubrina greggii is part of a species complex with C. angustior of San Luis Potosi, southern Tamaulipas, and northern Veracruz and C. yucatanensis of Campeche, Quintana Roo, Yucatán, and Guatemala's Petén Department. The latter two species were considered varieties of C. greggii until they were raised to full species in 2013.
