= Tepache =

Pineapple-based fermented beverage

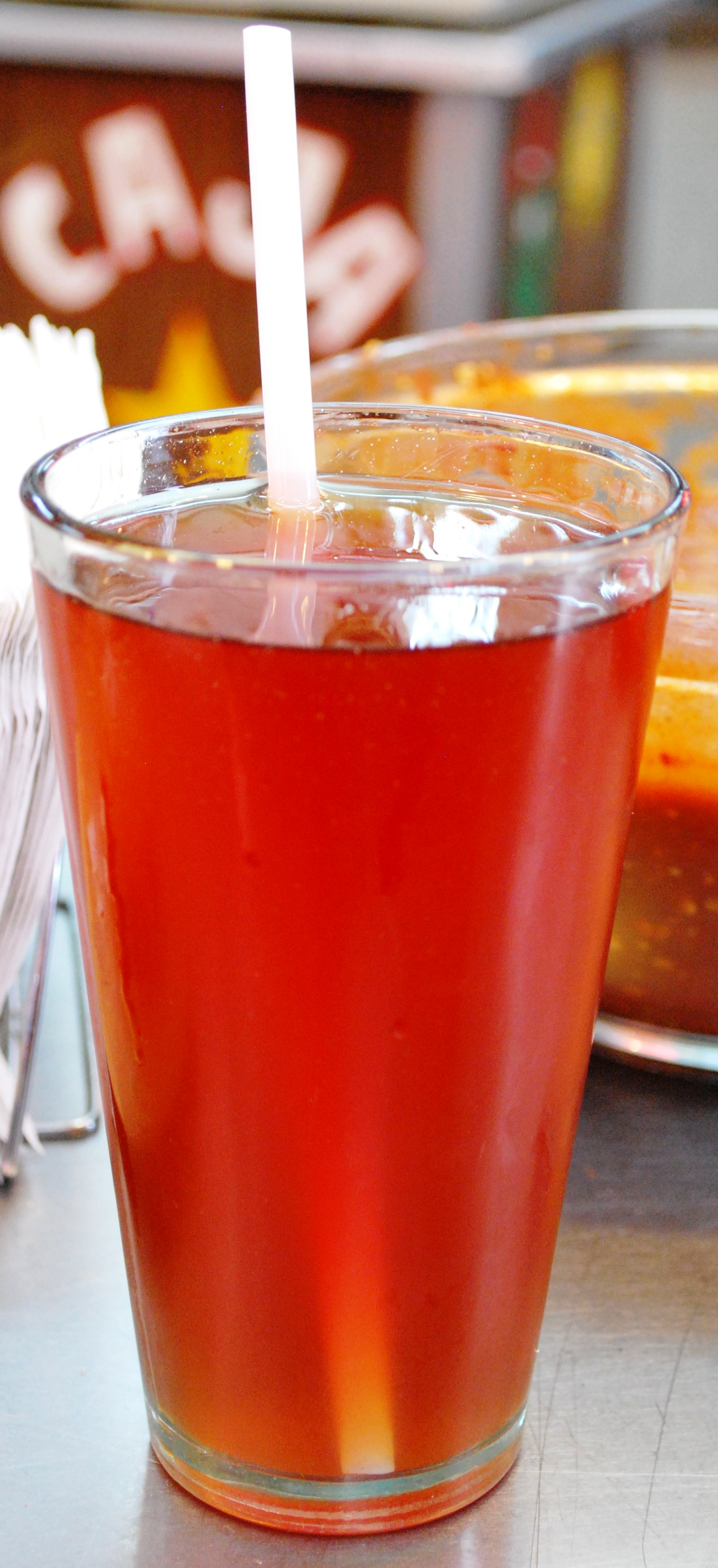
- A glass of cold tepache served at a taco stand in the Tacubaya neighbourhood of Mexico City
- Course: Beverage
- Place of origin: Mexico
- Serving temperature: cold
- Main ingredients: pineapple, piloncillo
- Variations: added beer and cinnamon

Tepache is a fermented beverage made from the peel and the rind of pineapples, and is sweetened either with piloncillo or brown sugar. It is sometimes seasoned with chili powder and served cold. Tepache is usually sold as a chilled drink by street vendors in Mexico, stored in barrels to expedite the fermentation process. It is served either in a clay mug or in a clear plastic bag with a straw inserted for easier travel. In the U.S., it is sold in juice bars or traditional Mexican restaurants within Mexican American communities of the Southwestern United States.

The fermentation process for making tepache is simple and quick, making it a drink readily produced at home. Though tepache is fermented for several days, the resulting drink does not contain much alcohol. The fermentation process, which can occur in one or two days, relies on naturally occurring yeast and bacteria present on the pineapple peels and in the environment. The sugar serves as a nutrient source for these microbes, which produce lactic acid and carbon dioxide, contributing to tepache's slight effervescence and tart flavor.

Tepache is fermented by different microorganisms. Bacteria, such as Lactobacillus pentosus, L. paracasei, L. plantarum, L. lactis and yeast from the genus Saccharomyces have been found in tepache. For optimal fermentation, it is recommended to use unrefined sugar such as piloncillo, which enhances the flavor and color of the drink. Tap water should be filtered to remove chlorine, which can inhibit the fermentation process. Tepache itself is low or lacking in alcohol, but may be increased with a small amount of beer according to personal preference.

== Origin ==
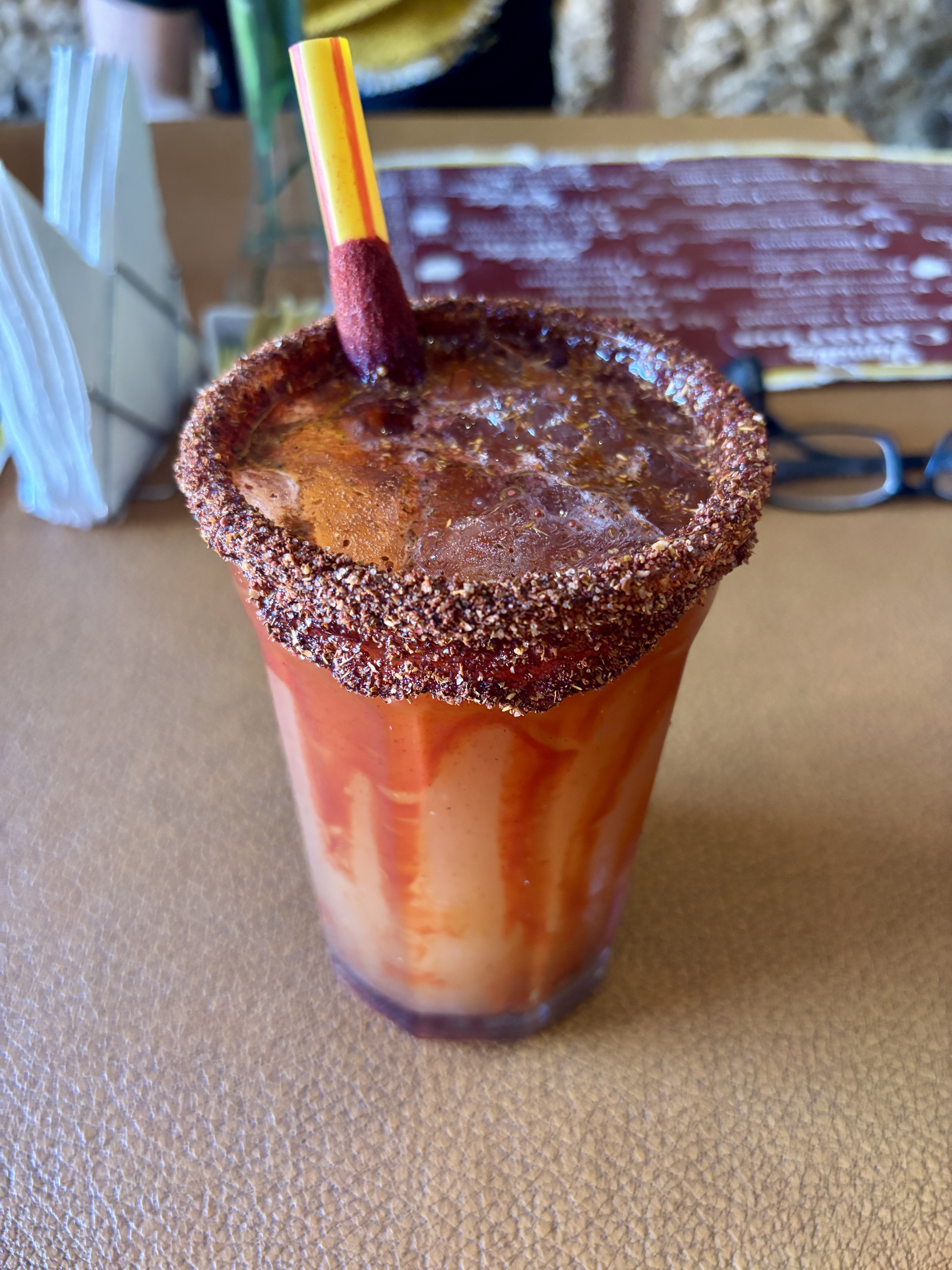
Tepachelada beverage served in Xico, Veracruz, made with tepache, chile, salt, and other ingredients.

Tepache dates from Pre-Columbian Mexico, as a popular drink among the Nahua people of central Mexico; it derives from the Nahuatl tepiātl, which originally referred to "a drink made from raw corn, given to those who are fainting". Originally, corn (maize) was the base of tepache, but the contemporary recipe for tepache uses pineapple rinds as the foodstuff fermented to produce the tart drink that is tepache. Some varieties of tepache, known as tepache de tibicos, are fermented using symbiotic cultures of tibicos.

== Commercialization ==
Because of the popularity of tepache in Mexico, the drink is now being produced commercially as a non-alcoholic drink. There are a few different brands of tepache including Tepache from the Frumex Corporation. The original Frumex Tepache contained 12% juice and was made from fermented skins and pulp along with some sugar, spices, and barley. That version was replaced with a newer version that contained only 10% juice and no barley. That one was made from only fermented pineapple juice, no skins or pulp. The latest version, now rebranded as Tepachito, still contains only 10% juice but it is made from fermented juice and skin, no barley. It does include white and brown sugar and spices.

== See also ==
- Indigenous cuisine
- Tejuino
- Pulque
- Chicha de piña
- Kvass, another lightly-fermented drink low in alcohol
- Kombucha, lightly-fermented tea drink
