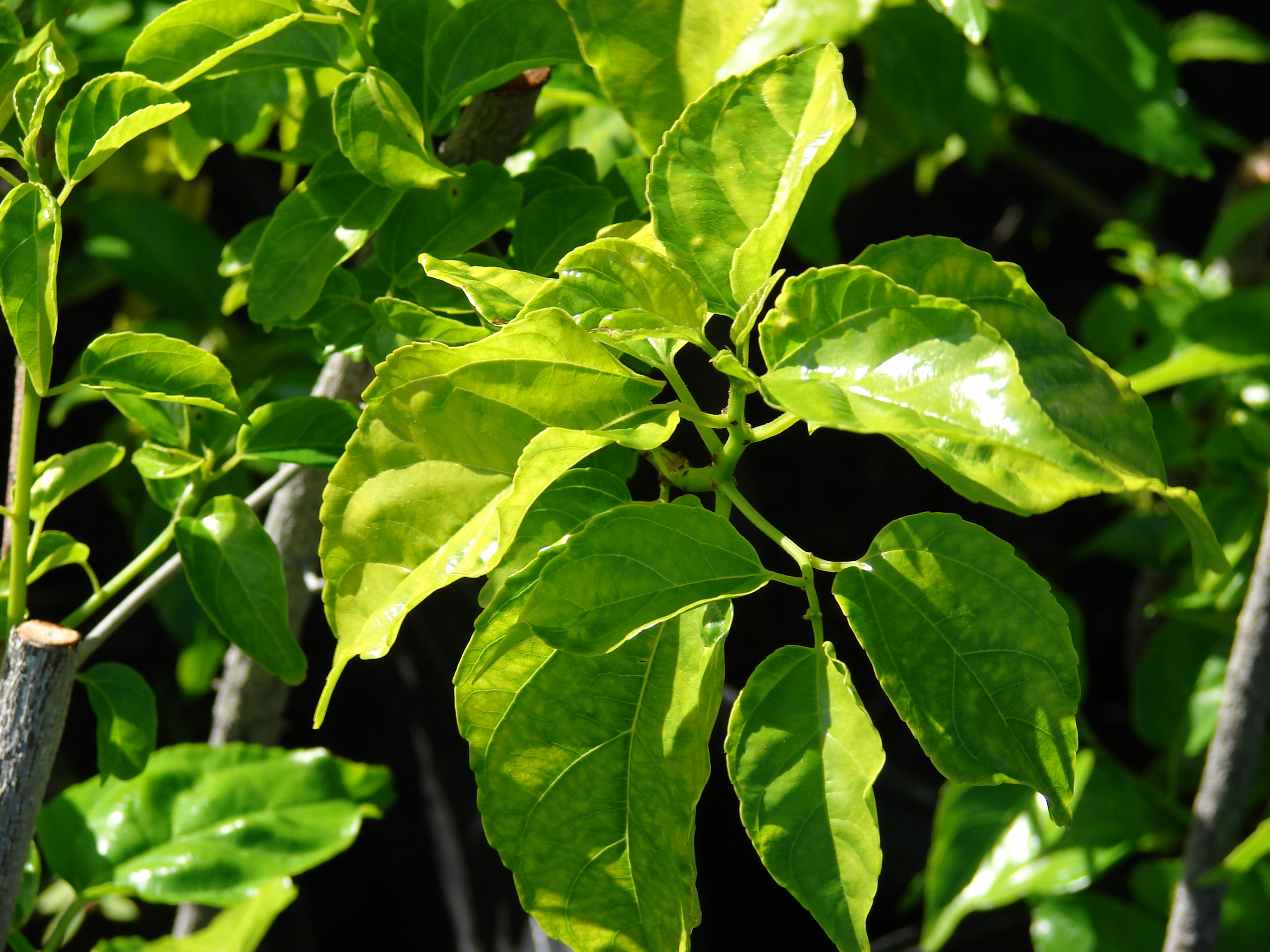
- Colubrina asiatica in Hawaii

Scientific classification
- Kingdom: Plantae
- Clade: Embryophytes
- Clade: Tracheophytes
- Clade: Angiosperms
- Clade: Eudicots
- Clade: Rosids
- Order: Rosales
- Family: Rhamnaceae
- Genus: Colubrina; Rich. ex Brongn.

Type species
- Colubrina ferruginosa Brongn.

Species
- See text

Synonyms
- Barcena Druges; Cormonema Reissek ex Endl.; Diplisca Raf.; Hybosperma Urb.; Macrorhamnus Baill.; Marcorella (Neck. ex G.Don) Raf.; Rhamnobrina H.Perrier; Tralliana Lour.; Tubanthera Comm. ex DC.

= Colubrina =

Genus of flowering plants

Colubrina is a genus of flowering plants in the family Rhamnaceae. It is native to warm temperate to tropical regions of Africa, the Americas, southern Asia, northern Australia, and islands of the Pacific and Indian Oceans.

== Names ==
Common names include nakedwood, snakewood, greenheart and hogplum. The generic name is derived from the Latin word coluber, meaning "snake", and refers to the snake-like stems or stamens.

== Description ==
The species are shrubs and small trees growing 1–10 metres (3.3–32.8 ft) tall, with simple ovate leaves. The flowers are small, greenish-white or yellowish; the fruit is a capsule containing three seeds.

== Taxonomy ==
In 2005, the genus was considered at least in part a wastebasket taxon, and that revision would likely result in the renaming of a number of species to different genera in the future.

=== Species ===
As of August 2026, Plants of the World Online accepted these species:

- Colubrina acunae Kitan.
- Colubrina alluaudii (H.Perrier) Capuron
- Colubrina amazonica W.Palacios
- Colubrina angustior (M.C.Johnst.) G.L.Nesom (eastern Mexico)
- Colubrina arborescens (Mill.) Sarg. – Greenheart (southern Florida, southern Mexico, the Caribbean, Central America)
- Colubrina articulata (Capuron) Figueiredo
- Colubrina asiatica (L.) Brongn. – Asian nakedwood, ʻĀnapanapa kukuku (Hawaiian) (Indo-Pacific)
- Colubrina beccariana Warb. (Malaysia)
- Colubrina berteroana Urb.
- Colubrina californica I.M.Johnst. – Las Animas nakedwood
- Colubrina cordifolia Reissek
- Colubrina cubensis (Jacq.) Brongn. – Cuban nakedwood (southern Florida, The Bahamas, Cayman Islands, Cuba)
- Colubrina decipiens (Baill.) Capuron
- Colubrina ehrenbergii Schltdl.
- Colubrina elliptica (Sw.) Brizicky & W.L.Stern – mabi, soldierwood (Florida Keys, Mexico, the Caribbean, Central America, Venezuela)
- Colubrina faraloatra (H.Perrier) Capuron
- Colubrina ferruginosa Brongn.
- Colubrina glandulosa Perkins – glandular nakedwood
- Colubrina greggii S.Watson – Sierra nakedwood
- Colubrina heteroneura (Griseb.) Standl.
- Colubrina humbertii (H.Perrier) Capuron
- Colubrina javanica Miq.
- Colubrina johnstonii T.Wendt
- Colubrina lanceolata G.L.Nesom
- Colubrina limae Figueira
- Colubrina macrocarpa (Cav.) G.Don
- Colubrina macrocarpoides (Suess.) G.L.Nesom
- Colubrina mezquitalensis G.L.Nesom
- Colubrina neoviridis G.L.Nesom
- Colubrina nicholsonii Van Wyk & Schrire – Pondo snakewood, Pondo weeping thorn, Afrikaans: Pondo-treurdoring
- Colubrina obscura (Schrank) M.C.Johnst.
- Colubrina oppositifolia Brongn. ex H.Mann – kauila (Hawaii)
- Colubrina pedunculata Baker f. (Christmas Island)
- Colubrina retusa (Pittier) R.S.Cowan
- Colubrina sordida M.C.Johnst.
- Colubrina spinosa Donn.Sm.
- Colubrina stricta Engelm. ex M.C.Johnst. – Comal nakedwood
- Colubrina subsessilis G.L.Nesom
- Colubrina tequila G.L.Nesom
- Colubrina texensis (Torr. & A.Gray) A.Gray – snakewood or Texan hogplum (Texas, northern Mexico)
- Colubrina travancorica Bedd.
- Colubrina triflora Brongn. ex Sweet
- Colubrina verrucosa (Urb.) M.C.Johnst. – Urban's nakedwood
- Colubrina villarrealii G.L.Nesom
- Colubrina viridis (M.E.Jones) M.C.Johnst.
- Colubrina yucatanensis (M.C.Johnst.) G.L.Nesom (Yucatán Peninsula)

=== Formerly placed here ===
- Alphitonia excelsa (Fenzl) Reissek ex Benth. (as C. excelsa Fenzl)
- Hovenia celtidifolia (Schltdl. & Cham.) G.L.Nesom (as C. celtidifolia)

== Ecology ==
Colubrina species are used as food plants by the larvae of some Lepidoptera species including Bucculatrix kendalli which feeds exclusively on C. texensis. Colubrina asiatica, native to tropical Asia, eastern Africa and northern Australia, has become an invasive species in Florida.

== Uses ==
In the Caribbean, the leaves and/or fruit and in some cases the bark of some species such as Colubrina elliptica (soldierwood) are used to produce a soft drink called mauby.
