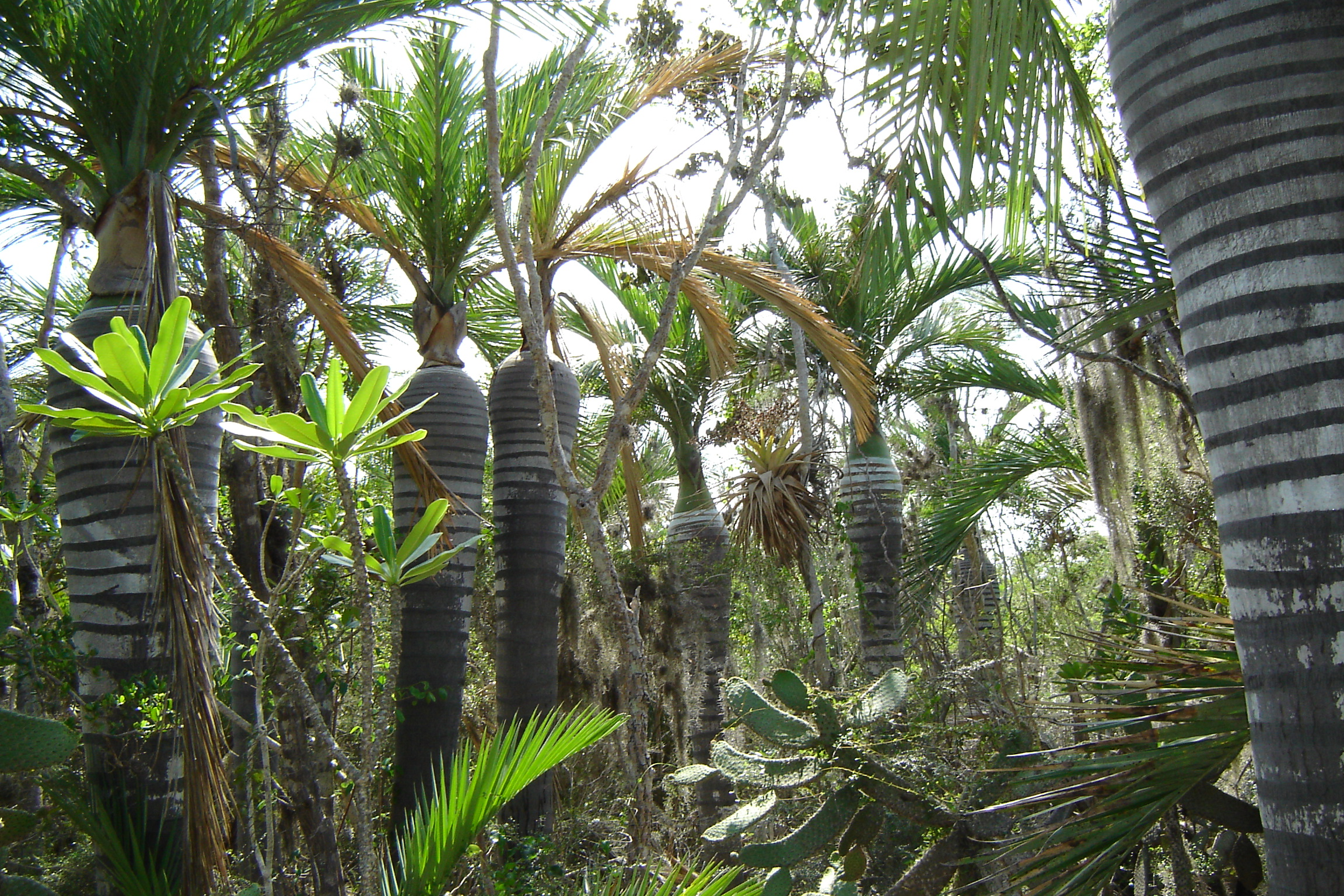
- Near Oviedo, Dominican Republic

Conservation status
- Critically Endangered (IUCN 3.1)

Scientific classification
- Kingdom: Plantae
- Clade: Tracheophytes
- Clade: Angiosperms
- Clade: Monocots
- Clade: Commelinids
- Order: Arecales
- Family: Arecaceae
- Genus: Pseudophoenix
- Species: P. ekmanii

Binomial name
- Pseudophoenix ekmanii Burret

= Pseudophoenix ekmanii =

Species of palm

Pseudophoenix ekmanii is a palm species endemic to the Barahona Peninsula and Isla Beata in the Dominican Republic on the Caribbean island of Hispaniola.

== Names ==
In Dominican Spanish, P. ekmanii is known as cacheo or cacheo de Oviedo. In English, the species is usually referred to as the Dominican cherry palm.

== Description ==
It is a small tree (4 to 6 m tall), with pinnately compound leaves and solitary, swollen stems. The fruit are reddish with a diameter of about 2 cm.

== Conservation ==
Pseudophoenix ekmanii was once used in palm wine production. Trees were cut down and the pith extracted, especially from the swollen portion of the stem. The sap was then extracted and fermented. As a consequence of this cutting for palm wine production, the species is considered Critically Endangered. Current threats also include illegal collection, including to remove nests and chicks of the Hispaniolan parrot, a vulnerable species, and for sale in horticulture.
