= Pique sauce =

Puerto Rican hot sauce

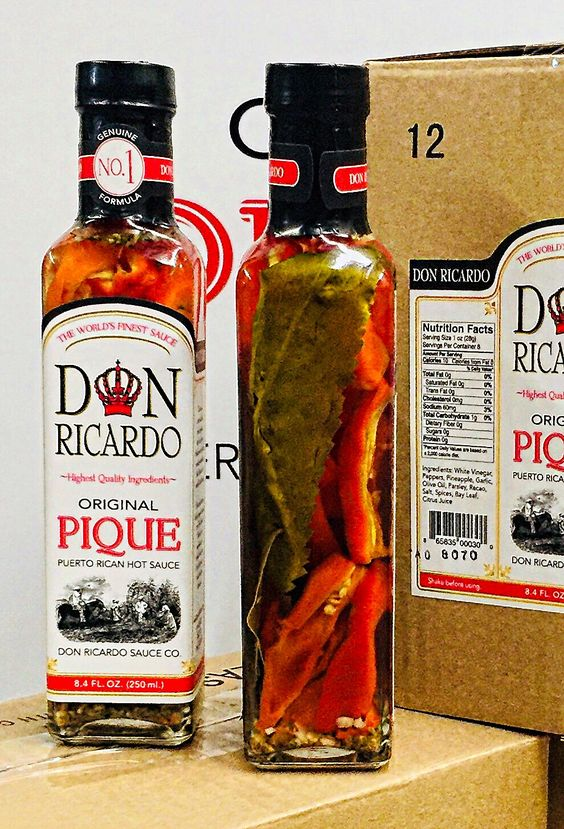
Pique sauce

Pique is a traditional hot sauce from Puerto Rico that is typically made with a variety of chili peppers, garlic, and spices. It is often made by fermenting the ingredients, which can give it a unique flavor profile and a more complex taste. Some variations may include ingredients such as cilantro, oregano, or onions. Pique is commonly used as a condiment for a variety of traditional Puerto Rican dishes such as rice, beans, and meat dishes. It can also be used as a marinade for meats or as a dip for tostones or other fried foods. Pique is a staple condiment in Puerto Rico and is often homemade, but can also be found in grocery stores.

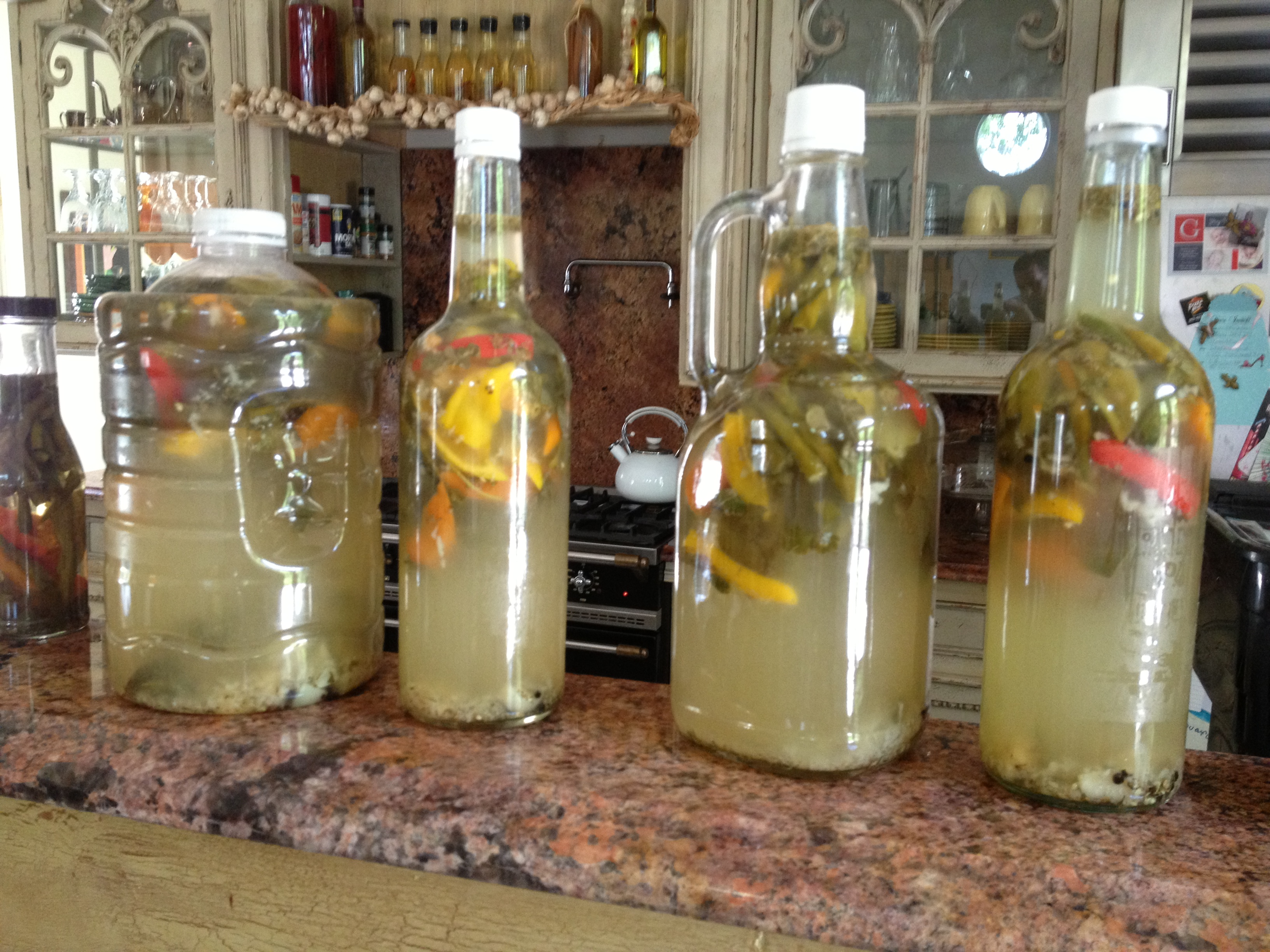
Pique sauce fermenting

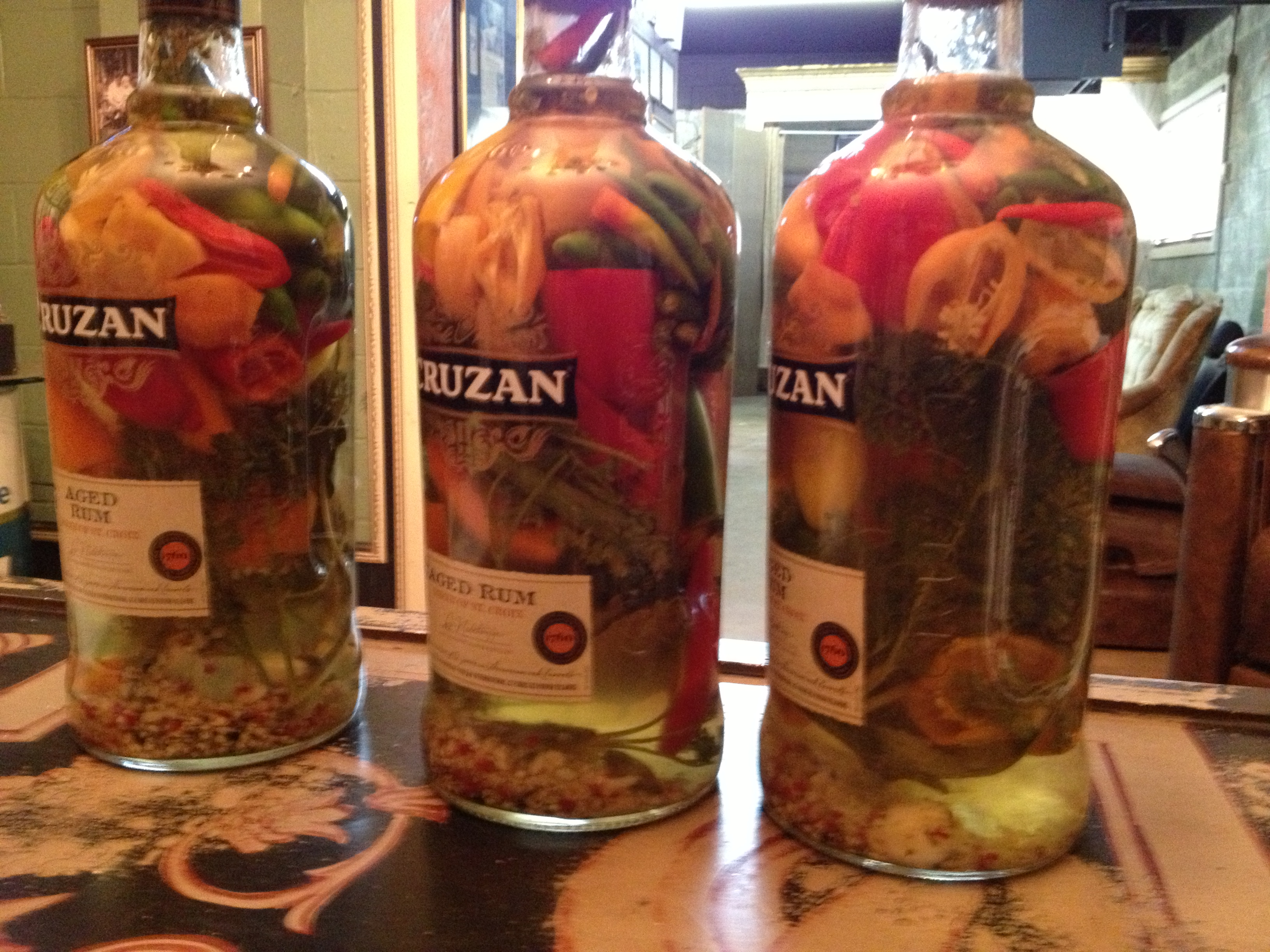
Homemade pique sauce

Different types of island ajíes picantes (hot peppers) will have varying amounts of heat; the hottest of all is the ají caballero.

== Pique criollo ==
Pique criollo, also known as pique boricua de botella or Puerto Rican Tabasco, is a hot condiment used in Puerto Rican cooking. It is made of Cubanelle peppers, caballero hot peppers and/or habanero peppers, pineapple (skin, core, juice and/or small pieces), vinegar, oregano, peppercorns, garlic and/or onions. Additional ingredients can be citrus fruit, cilantro, culantro, sugar, coriander seeds, cumin, rum or chocolate. Although pineapple is most traditional it can be replaced with papaya, avocado, sour orange, sweet plantain, tamarind, mango, passion fruit or guava.
