= Chicha de piña =

Latin American beverage

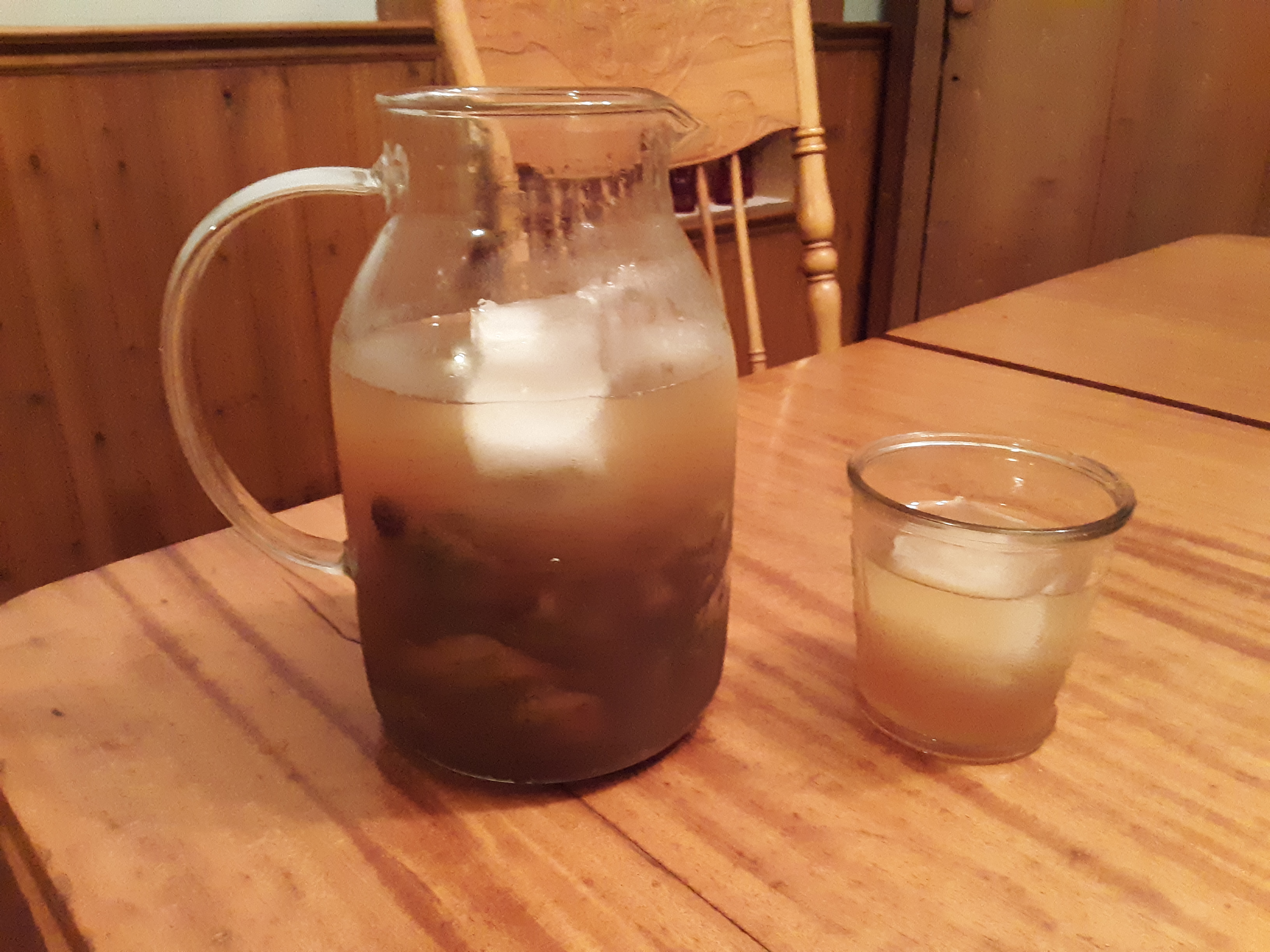
A pitcher of iced chicha de piña, after the flavors have been allowed to concentrate for two days in the refrigerator

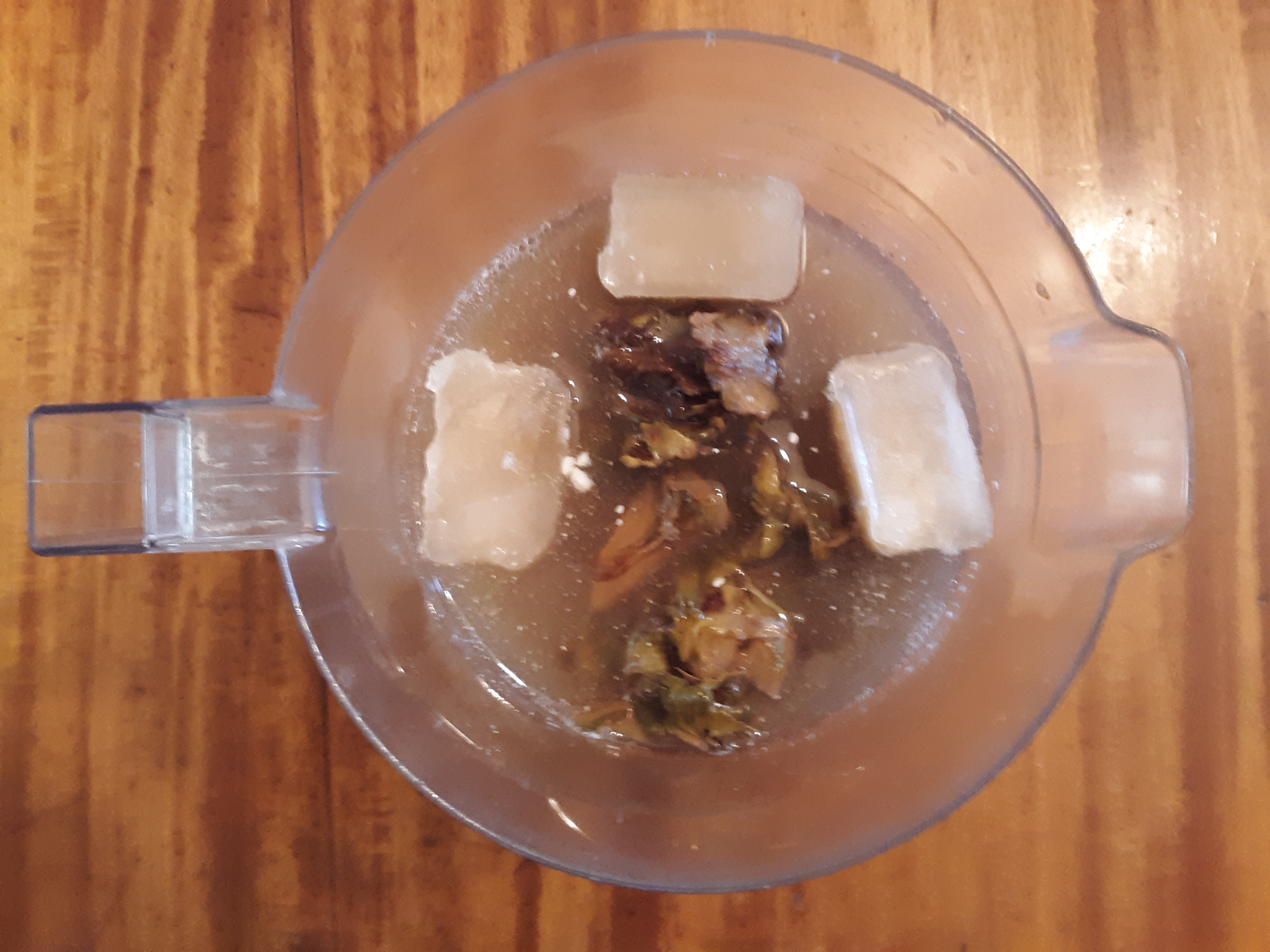
Chicha de piña with cinnamon, cloves, and apple juice cubes. The pineapple rinds have become soft from steeping in the refrigerator for a few days.

Chicha de piña is a Latin American spicy chicha made from pineapple crusts and cores, panela or brown sugar, and spices such as cinnamon, clove, allspice, ginger, anise, vanilla, and nutmeg. It is prepared simply by putting all the ingredients in a pot of water, boiling it, and then simmering it for an hour, before either chilling it to let the flavors further concentrate, or drinking it hot. Some recipes also call for the addition of rice and/or milk.In the Dominican Republic the drink is made with additional rice and known as pera-piña (pear-pineapple) because of the texture that resembles pear juice.
