= Chimichurri burger =

Traditional sandwich served in the Dominican Republic

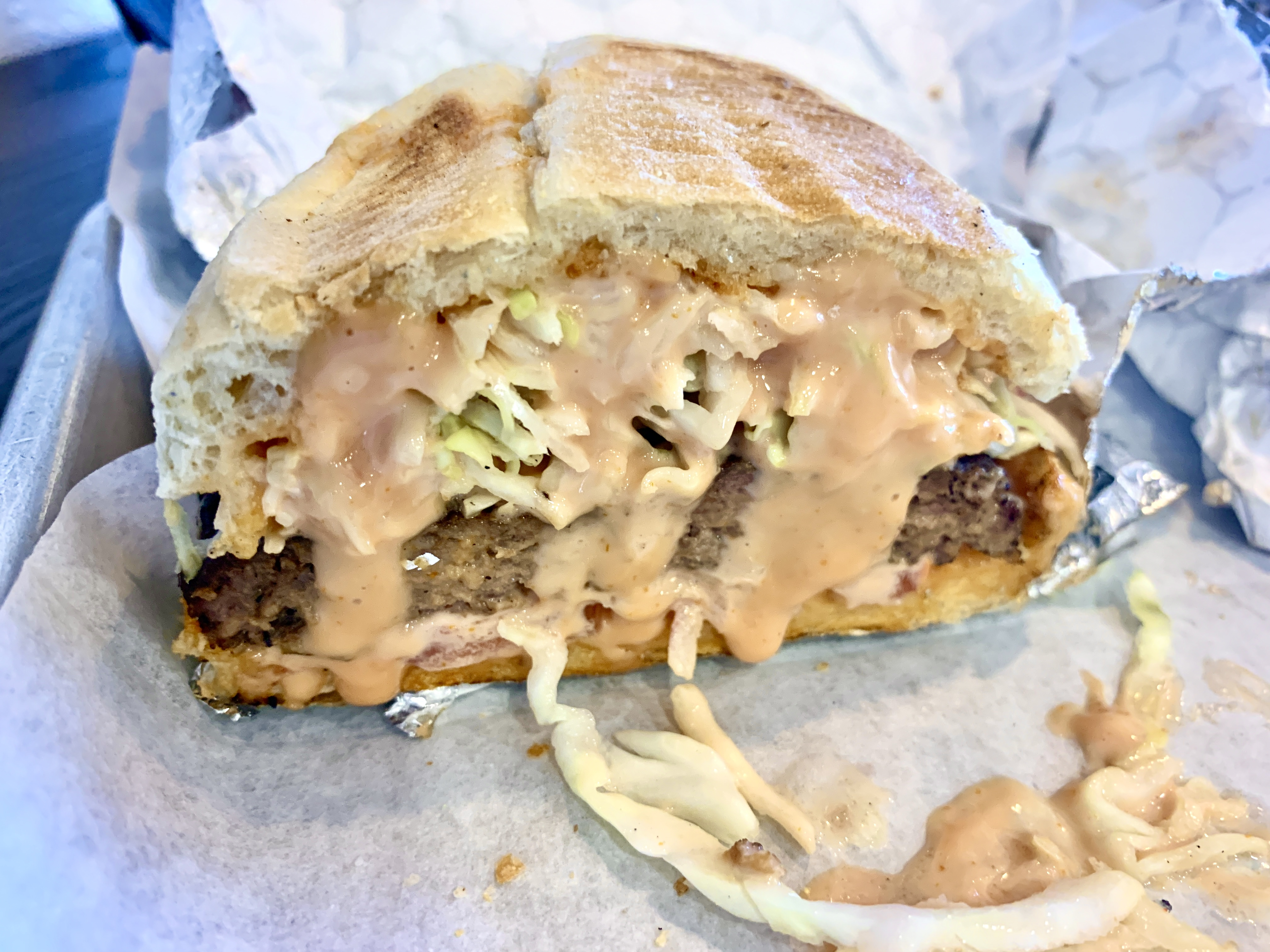
Chimichurri burger

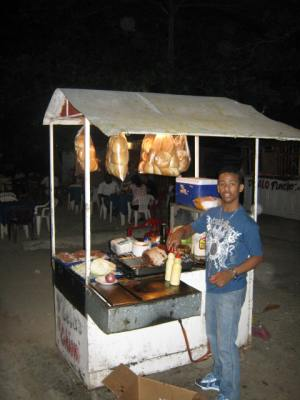
Chimi street vendor in the Dominican Republic

The chimichurri burger (usually called chimi burger, Dominican burger, or simply chimi) is a traditional sandwich served in the Dominican Republic.

It is made from ground pork or beef, which is sliced, grilled and served on a pan de agua (literally 'water bread') and garnished with chopped cabbage. Salsa golf is also added. This dish is made throughout the Dominican Republic and is usually sold on street stands.

== Outside the Dominican Republic ==
Chimichurris are popularly sold out of food trucks in the Dominican Republic and in various areas of the United States. Such areas include: Washington Heights, Manhattan, New York; Corona, Queens, New York; Brooklyn, New York; Paterson, New Jersey; Highlandtown area in Baltimore; the Allapattah area of Miami, Florida; East and South Orlando, Florida; Boston and Lawrence, Massachusetts; north of San Antonio, Texas; and in Providence, Rhode Island.

== Origin ==
Although the precise origins of the Dominican chimi remain unclear, many across the island credit the burger to the Argentine cook Juan Abrales, who moved to the Dominican Republic from Argentina in the 1970s. The burger is similar to popular street food in Argentina where they top sandwiches, hot dogs, grilled meats and chorizo with chimichurri sauce and slaw. Salsa golf has its origin in Argentina where the sauce is used for shrimp, fried foods, hot dogs, sandwiches and burgers.

== See also ==
- List of sandwiches
