= Vinifera =

Vinifera may refer to:

- Vinifera, Victoria, a locality in Australia
- 759 Vinifera, a minor planet orbiting the Sun
- Vitis vinifera, the common grape vine
