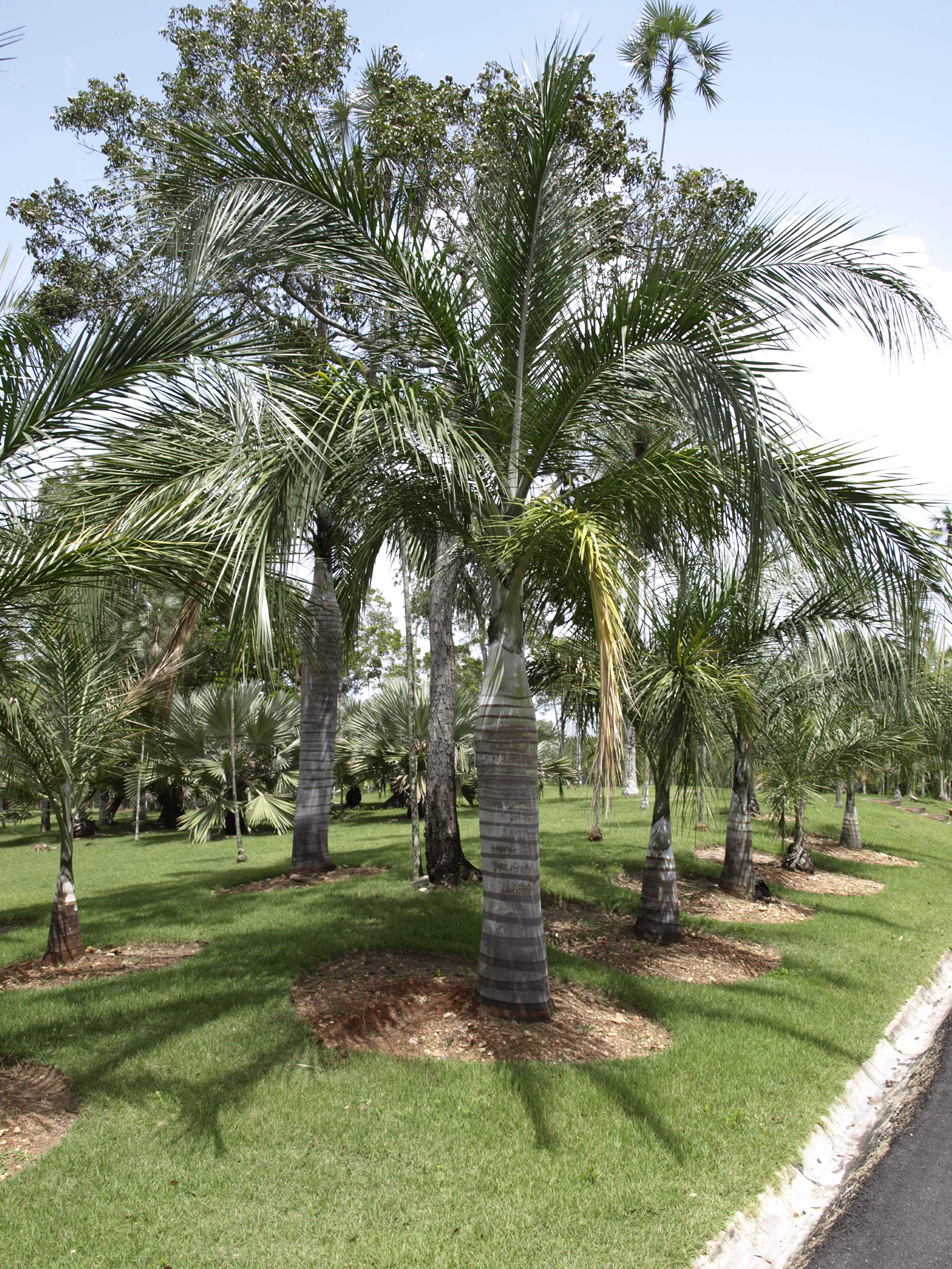

Scientific classification
- Kingdom: Plantae
- Clade: Tracheophytes
- Clade: Angiosperms
- Clade: Monocots
- Clade: Commelinids
- Order: Arecales
- Family: Arecaceae
- Genus: Pseudophoenix
- Species: P. vinifera

Binomial name
- Pseudophoenix vinifera (Mart.) Becc.

Synonyms
- Euterpe vinifera Mart.; Cocos vinifera (Mart.) Mart.; Gaussia vinifera (Mart.) H.Wendl.; Aeria vinifera (Mart.) O.F.Cook; Pseudophoenix insignis O.F.Cook

= Pseudophoenix vinifera =

Species of palm

Pseudophoenix vinifera (Dominican Spanish: cacheo, Haitian Creole: katié) is a palm species endemic to the Caribbean island of Hispaniola, in the Dominican Republic and Haiti.

== Uses ==
Pseudophoenix vinifera was once used in palm wine production. Trees were cut down and the pith was extracted, especially from the swollen portion of the stem. Sap was then extracted and fermented.
