= Puerto Rican cuisine =

Culinary traditions of Puerto Rico

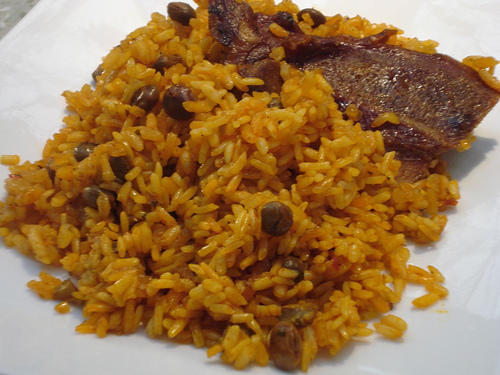
Arroz con gandules, widely regarded as "Puerto Rico's national dish"

Puerto Rican cuisine consists of the cooking style and traditional dishes original to Puerto Rico. It has been primarily a fusion influenced by the ancestors of the Puerto Rican people: the indigenous Taínos, Spanish Criollos and sub-Saharan African slaves. As a territory of the United States, the culinary scene of Puerto Rico has also been moderately influenced by American cuisine.

== History ==
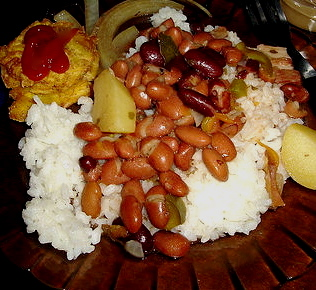
Cocina criolla can be traced back to Spanish inhabitants of the island.

Puerto Rican cuisine is a product of diverse cultural influences, including Taíno Arawak, Spanish Criollos, and Africans. It is characterized by a unique blend of Spanish seasonings and ingredients, which makes it similar to Spanish and other Latin American cuisines. Locally, it is known as cocina criolla.

The roots of traditional Puerto Rican cuisine can be traced back to the 15th century. In 1848, the first restaurant, La Mallorquina, was opened in Old San Juan. The island's first cookbook, El Cocinero Puerto-Riqueño o Formulario, was published in 1859.

=== Taíno influence ===
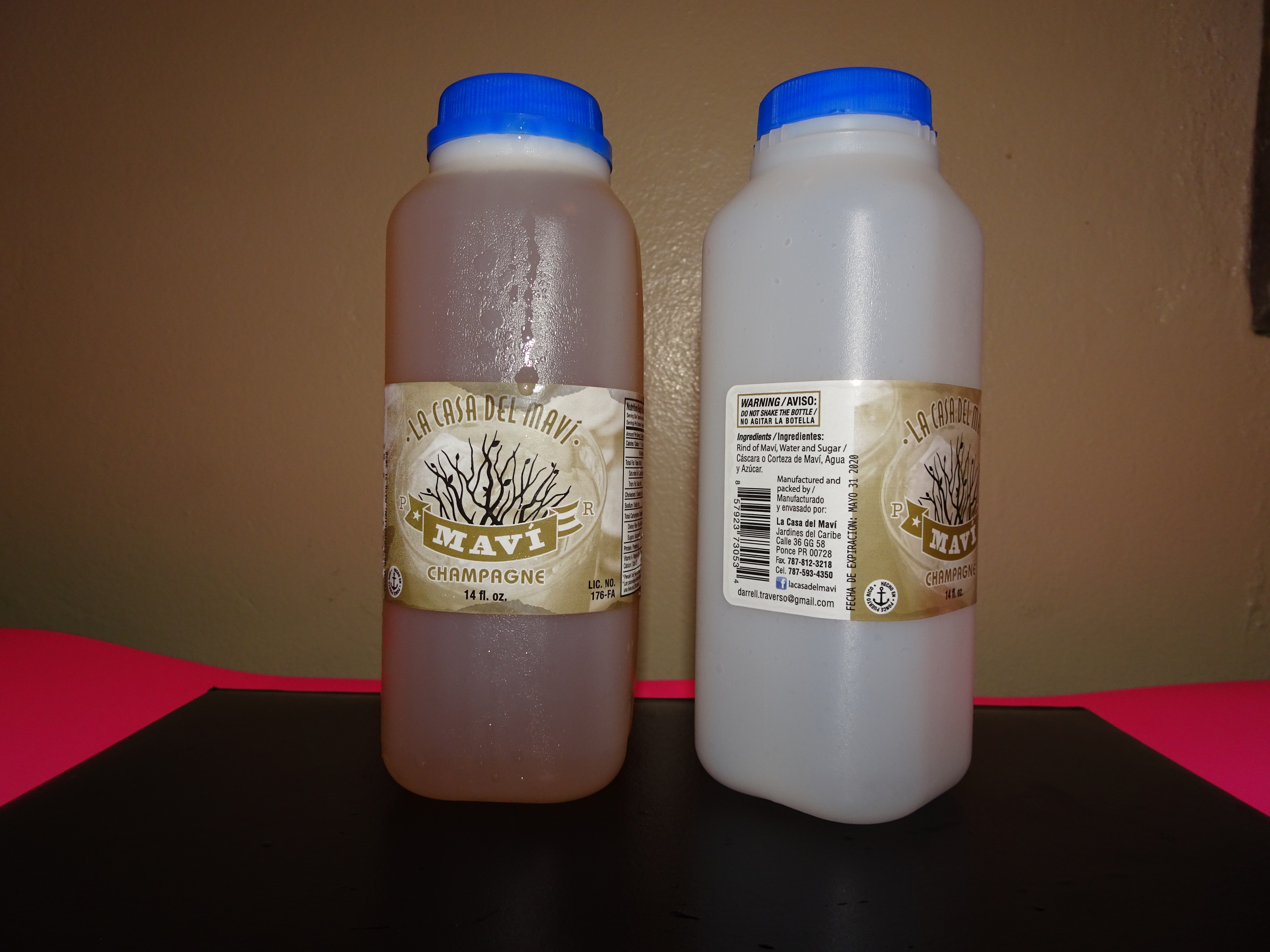
Maví bottles from Ponce, Puerto Rico; left bottle has maví, the right one is empty

Many of the arrowroots and root vegetables used in Puerto Rican cuisine, collectively known as viandas, have their roots in the diets of the indigenous Taíno people. These include cassava (Spanish: yuca) and three kinds of tannier (Spanish: yautía) which are staples in traditional Puerto Rican dishes. Other popular root vegetables include sweet corn root (Spanish: lerén), sweet potato (Spanish: batata mameya), celeriac (Spanish: apio criollo), white sweet potato (Spanish: batata; this potato has purple skin and white flesh) and yambee (Spanish: yambi), all of which are cultivated in the mountain regions of the island.

It is hypothesized that Taínos used cooking methods that resemble what is called barbecue today. By some counts, the earliest recorded use of the term barbecue can be traced back to a journal entry made by a Spanish settler upon landing in the Caribbean. The term was used by the indigenous Taino people, who referred to the practice of slow-cooking food over a raised wooden platform as barabicu, which means "sacred pit" in their language. While the Tainos likely slow-roasted fish due to the region and their diet at the time, this cooking method may have given rise to what is today known as barbecue. The Taíno ate a variety of spices, herbs, fruits and foods, including squash, allspice, avocado (fruit and leaves), chili, beans, peppers, papaya (fruit, leaves, and seeds used as a spice), guava (fruit and leaves, wood was used for fire and cooking), soursop (fruit and leaves), corn, lippia, peanuts, and culantro. Some of these foods are still part of Puerto Rican cooking today. The Taínos hunted birds, reptiles, and small mammals, such as hutia and gathered snails, eggs, honey, clams, oysters, and mussels. They also captured manatees and turtles.

=== African influence ===
While the contributions made by people of African descent are often overlooked in Puerto Rico, their cultural contributions to the island are significant. Several popular Puerto Rican dishes date back to African influences including mofongo, bacalaitos, funche, and pasteles.

Africans transformed the ceramic cooking tool used by native Tainos to make casaba (yuca-based flatbread) into an iron griddle called “burén.” The tool is used for cooking coconut-based candies wrapped in banana leaf, mondongo, sancocho, coconut rice, gandinga, cazuela, and many plates they brought to the Puerto Rican culinary culture. Important ingredients such as bananas, plantains, yams, orégano brujo, pigeon peas, and maybe even rice were introduced by Africans through the slave trade. Africans also brought spices and used the native spice annatto in food. Before then annatto was used by Tainos for body paint and a repellent against the sun.

The slave trade brought guinea fowl to the Caribbean from West Africa in the 1500s. Guinea fowl is a traditional Puerto Rican dish that can be prepared as a fricassee in lemon zest, sofrito, wine, raisins, olives, and other ingredients. Roasted and marinated traditionally in adobo, orégano brujo, sazón, citrus, and vinegar and often stiffed with mofongo or arroz junto (rice, beans, and pork).

A traditional and typical meal in the Caribbean is braised fish, meat, vegetables, and beans that derived from the African cuisine. In Puerto Rico these braised dishes called guisadas are served over rice, mofongo, or funche. In Puerto Rico guisadas are typically made with olives, capers, cumin, annatto oil, bay leaves, recaito, lippia micromera, coriander seeds with tomato sauce, potato and pig feet to thicken the sauce. Chicken can be made with bits of ham and beer while beef switches out beer and ham for wine, mushrooms and adds rosemary, both have carrots and sweet peas. Beans like black, red or pink are cooked with additional squash and also bits of ham or salchichón (Puerto Rican salami) in water or broth. Salted cod fish guisadas is also a popular dish with no pork included cooked in white wine, cream and/or coconut milk and served with guanimes (Taino dish similar to tamal).

=== Spanish influence ===
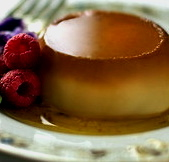
Puerto Rican cuisine has several recipes for flan

Chorizo is a sausage brought over from Spain that is used in a variety of Puerto Rican dishes. Arroz con pollo is frequently made with chorizo; other chorizo dishes include asopao con pollo y chorizo (rice soup with chicken and chorizo), arroz mamposteao (Puerto Rican fried rice with chorizo), chorizo potato salad, and classic breakfast chorizo with chayote and eggs.

As in Spain, bakeries function as social hubs. These local bakeries were first established by Spanish settlers. Major desserts include flan, a favorite among Hispanic families. There are many flavors of coffee, coquito, orangelo, soursop, piña colada, cassava, sweet plantain, and countless others throughout the island. Originally from Spain, Brazo gitano is a typical dessert in the south of the island but can be found in bakeries all over Puerto Rico. Brazo gitano is a simple thin sponge filled with cream cheese and another ingredient (such as guava, mango, lemon, corn, passionfruit, papaya, carrots with sweet potato and spices, pistachio, or nutella) and rolled up.

Breadfruit was introduced to Puerto Rico by Captain William Bligh in 1793 and has since become a naturalized part of the island's landscape. This fruit is used as a replacement for plantains as it is used the same way. It is a favorite among Puerto Ricans and frequently paired with fish and coconut or as a dessert with coconut and banana. Mofongo de pana, breadfruit flan, alcapurria de pana, tostones de pana (re-fried breadfruit), pastele de pana, pastelón de pana (breadfruit casserole), ralleno de pana (breadfruit version of papa rellena), and cazuela replacing cassava with breadfruit. Breadfruit flour is widely available throughout the island and used to make cookies, empanada dough, fry batter, bread, pancakes, and waffles.

== Regional ==
=== Arecibo ===
Arecibo is the biggest municipality in Puerto Rico by area and is located on the northern coast. In the Río Grande de Arecibo, whitebait called cetí is caught.

== Basic ingredients ==
=== Seafood and shellfish ===
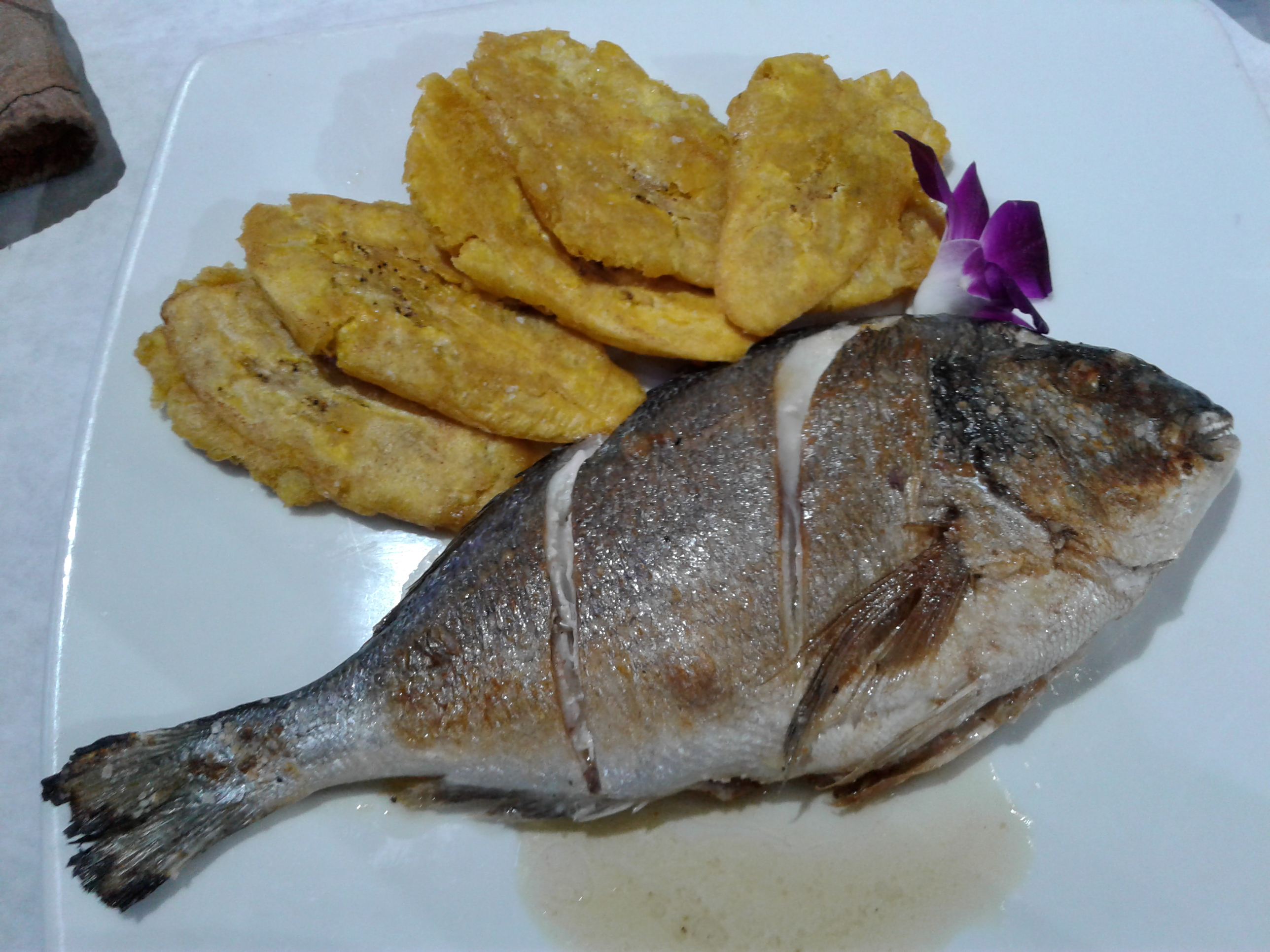
Fried red snapper at a restaurant in San Sebastián, Puerto Rico

On some coastal towns of the island, such as Luquillo, Fajardo, and Cabo Rojo, seafood is quite popular.

- Cetí – Cetí or whitebait is a tiny immature transparent fish that lives in the Río Grande de Arecibo. During the annual migration from July through December, cetí becomes abundant in the Arecibo area and is widely used in local cuisine. This tiny transparent fish is just about an inch long, and it is the most delicious when deep-fried and eaten whole.

The Arecibo region is also famous for its pasteles filled with cetí. Usually, Puerto Rican pasteles are cooked with meat, however, they taste even better with fish. The recipe includes cetí, squash, yuca, yautía, and coconut milk. Pasteles are always wrapped in banana leaf and grilled. It is one of the delicacies served during the Christmas holidays. Cetí is also used in mofongo, alcapurrias, empanadas and other Puerto Rican dishes.

- Chillo – Red snapper is a favorite among the locals.
- Codfish and dried and salted cod – Codfish has been a part of Puerto Rican cuisine for a long time, with a history that dates back to European exploration and trade. Salted cod was a staple food for European sailors and explorers because it was a non-perishable source of protein. It was also cheap labor food for slaves during the Atlantic slave trade. Salted codfish is cheap, easily accessible, and eaten daily in Puerto Rico. While most Puerto Ricans enjoy bacalao guisado, bacalaíto, buñuelos de bacalao (cod fritters replacing potato with yuca, batata, or sweet plantain), alcapurria stuffed with cod, arroz con bacalao (one-pot rice with salted codfish), croquettes de bacalao, serenata de bacalao, bacalao con viandas, caldo santo (sancocho made with coconut milk, codfish, and shellfish), and the famous codfish ice cream from Lares Ice Cream Parlor.

=== Seasoning ===
Traditional cooking on the island uses more fresh and local ingredients such as citrus to make mojo and mojito isleño and especially fresh herbs, vegetables and peppers to make recaíto and sofrito.

The base of many Puerto Rican main dishes involves sofrito, similar to the mirepoix of French cooking, or the "trinity" of Creole cooking. A proper sofrito is a sauté of freshly ground garlic, yellow onions, culantro, cilantro, red peppers, cachucha and cubanelle peppers. Sofrito is traditionally cooked with tomato paste or sauce, oil or lard, and cured pork. A mix of stuffed olives and capers called alcaparrado are usually added with dry spices. Adobo in Puerto Rico most traditional refers to a wet rub known as adobo mojado (wet seasoning) of Caribbean oregano, salt, black pepper, garlic, shallot, vinegar, citrus juice and zest.

Adobos come in two forms: dry (adobo seco) and wet (adobo mojado). Both use the same garlic, onion, salt, black pepper, lippia (orégano), and citrus. While adobo seco uses dry ingredients and the option of citrus zest, adobo mojado uses fresh ingredients mixed with olive oil, vinegar, and citrus juice. Both of these forms of adobo are typically rubbed on meats and fish. Adobo seco is considered more of an all-purpose seasoning used for most typically Puerto Rican dishes.

Sazón, like adobo, is widely used in Puerto Rican cuisine. It is traditionally made with cumin, salt, annatto powder, and coriander seeds, with the option of paprika, turmeric, crushed bay leaves or avocado leaves.

Sorfito and recaíto are used in the same way but with minor differences, as recaito is heavier on the herb culantro known as recao on the island thus giving its name recaito. The base is a puree made with a large amount or both cilantro and culantro, green bell peppers, garlic, yellow onions or scallions, oregano brujo, cachucha and recently parsely.

Annatto oil is made from steeping annatto seeds with oil or lard with olive oil used mostly and sometimes steeped with bay leaves. It is used for signature dishes adding a bright yellow-orange color and smoky peppery taste to pasteles, arroz con gandlues, alcapurrias, arroz junto, used to sear meats for stews and soups.

== Puerto Rican dishes ==
Traditional Puerto Rican breakfasts are characterized by their high energy value. Notable dishes include serenata de bacalao (salted codfish salad) and artisanal mashed root vegetables or tubers stand out. Furthermore, the use of crops like (batata, malanga) or pumpkin allows for the creation of pancakes de viandas. Although Puerto Rican diets can vary greatly from day to day, there are some markedly similar patterns to daily meals. Dinners almost invariably include a meat, and rice and beans.

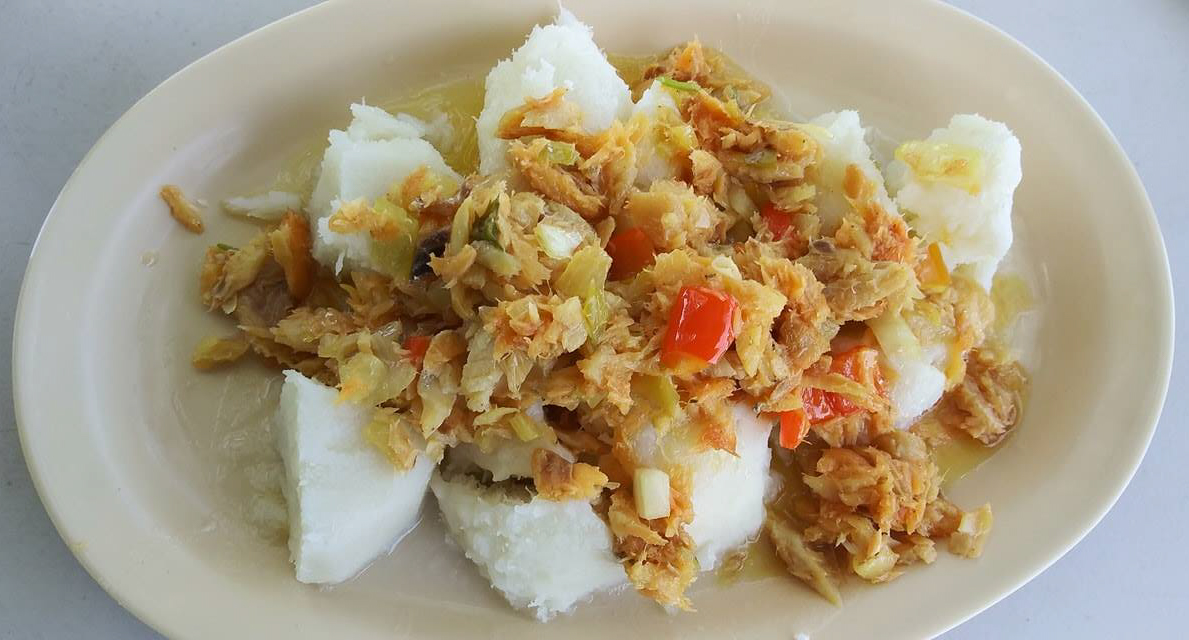
Taro and bacalao (codfish)

Codfish and taro is also a popular dish.

=== Thanksgiving dishes ===
Puerto Rico is an island colonized by the United States, characterized as a commonwealth. Cultural influence from the United States has spread Thanksgiving to Puerto Rico (Spanish: Día de Acción de Gracias). Puerto Rican Thanksgiving traditions are similar to those on the mainland, and include turkey; arroz con gandules or arroz con maiz; pasteles stuffed with turkey, spicy cranberry sauce, cornbread, squash or batata; coquito; pastelón; potato salad; and morcilla.

The meal often includes stuffing the turkey with bread, which can be mixed with mofongo or replaced entirely with it. The dish is called pavochon, which is a combination of the words pavo, meaning turkey, and lechón, referring to roasted suckling pig. Pavochón is essentially a turkey that is seasoned and cooked like roasted pork.

Desserts and sweets are often the same as Christmas or any other holiday that includes arroz con dulce, bread pudding, flan, cheesecake, tembleque, and cazuela. Pumpkin, batata, sweet potato and pumpkin spices can be incorporated into these desserts.

=== Christmas dishes ===
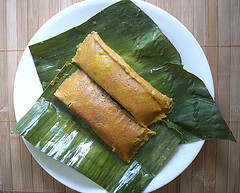
Pasteles are a staple during the Christmas festivities

Puerto Rican culture can be seen and felt all year-round, but it is on its greatest display during Christmas when people celebrate the traditional aguinaldo and parrandas – Puerto Rico's version of carol singing. Puerto Rican food is a main part of this celebration. Pasteles for many Puerto Rican families, the quintessential holiday season dish is pasteles, a soft dough-like mass wrapped in a banana leaf and boiled, and in the center chopped meat, raisins, capers, olives, and chick peas. Puerto Rican pasteles are made from milk, broth, plantain, green bananas, and tropical roots. The wrapper in a Puerto Rican pastele is a banana leaf. Many other dishes include arroz con gandules, roasted pork, potato salad with apples and chorizo, escabeche made with green banana and chicken gizzards, hallaca are the cassava version of pasteles, among other dishes. Coquito is a spiced coconut beverage typically served in a shot glass and similar to eggnog; family recipes vary. Desserts include flan, natillas, cream cheese spiced bread pudding made with currants and either guava or sweet plantains, coconut spiced rice pudding, tembleque a coconut pudding.

=== Beverages ===
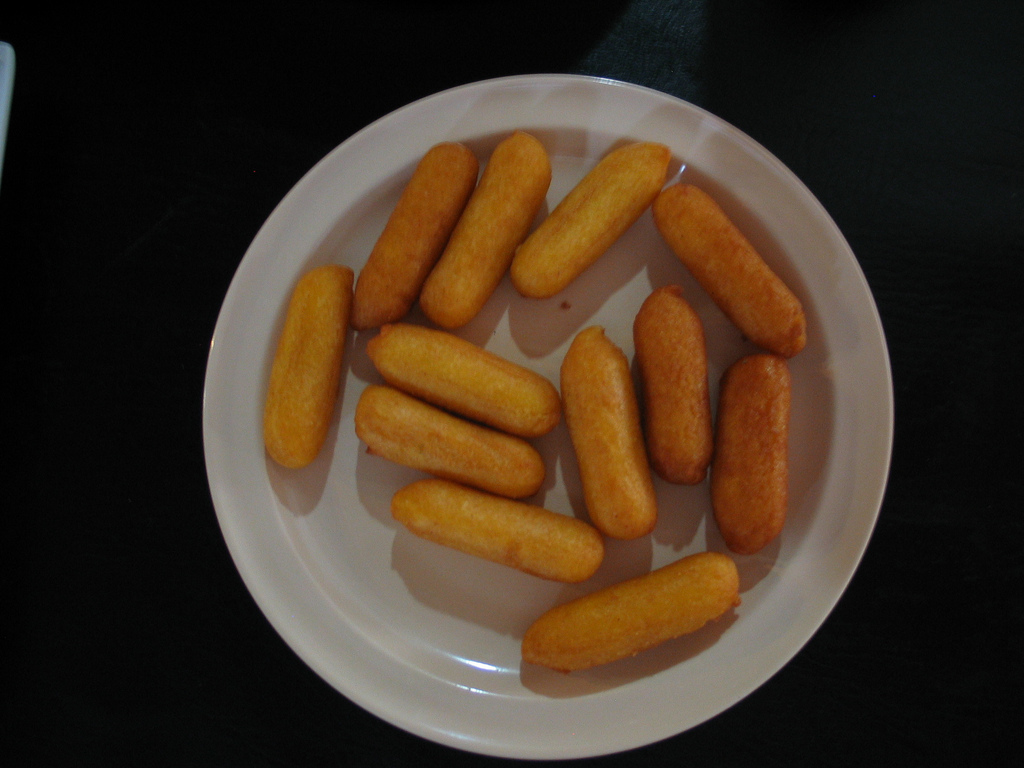
Sorullos from Puerto Rico

The history of Puerto Rican alcoholic drinks includes the production of rum and pitorro, the creation of the piña colada, and the evolution of the coquito.

Coffee production in Puerto Rico was first introduced in 1736, when Puerto Rico was a Spanish colony. At first, the industry thrived. By the beginning of the 1800s, civil wars in coffee producing countries had caused an increase in the price of the commodity worldwide. This paved the way for a surge in production. In combination with the arrival of new technologies and European immigrants, who both acquired and worked the land, Puerto Rico became the fourth-largest coffee producer in the Americas. The nineteenth century was a golden era of coffee for Puerto Rico. Coffee sent to the Vatican came from Puerto Rico, by the Cooperativa Cafeteros de Puerto Rico, which registered the Café Rico brand in 1924. For a long time, it was considered the best coffee in the world. It had a factory with a coffee cupping laboratory and the only one that had a certified coffee taster in the entire archipelago. Today Puerto Rico still produces small batches of grade 1 coffee and peaberry. Coquito lattes include coconut milk, condensed milk, egg yolk, and a variety of spices.

Soft drinks have a long history in Puerto Rico, including the creation of popular drinks and the local production of other brands. Coco Rico began marketing its drink in Puerto Rico in 1934, and patented the formula the following year. It is the first coconut soda and has gained popularity throughout the Caribbean, Mexico, and some parts of Latin America. Kola Champagne was invented in Puerto Rico by Ángel Rivero Méndez. Like Coco Rico, Kola Champagne is popular throughout the Caribbean and parts of Latin America, but also Pakistan. Malta (soft drink) may have come to Puerto Rico in the mid-19th century with German businesspeople or laborers, or with German and German-American immigrants who settled in Puerto Rico after World War I. A drink made from malta in Puerto Rico is called ponche de malta. Malta is mixed with whipped egg yolk, and condensed milk. A scoop of ice cream can be added and topped with cinnamon.

Cherry Coca-Cola, spiced rum, cherry liqueur, garnished with maraschino cherry and lime wedge called spiced cherry is a local play on the famous Cuba libre (rum and coke).

Spanish conquistadors brought horchata to the Americas during colonization, but they did not bring tiger nuts, the key ingredient in the original recipe. Instead, they used rice and other grains, and added sugar, cinnamon, vanilla, and sometimes marigolds. In Puerto Rico toasted sesame seeds are used and sometimes coconut milk is added.

=== Kiosks ===
Rustic stalls displaying many kinds fritters under heat lamps or behind a glass pane can be spotted in many places throughout Puerto Rico. Collectively known as frituras, these snacks are called cuchifritos in New York City, but to be strictly correct, cuchifritos are the mom-and-pop stores where frituras are sold. In Puerto Rico, the name quioscos (kiosk) is used to refer to the cuchifrito. Quioscos are a much-frequented, time-honored, and integral part to a day at the beach and the culinary culture of the island. Fresh octopus and conch salad are frequently seen. Much larger kiosks serve hamburgers, local/Caribbean fusion, Thai, Italian, Mexican and even Peruvian food. Most kiosks have a signature alcoholic drink.

=== Puerto Rican food outside Puerto Rico ===
Cuchifritos (carnitas) in New York

Jibarito and rice in Chicago

In New York City, cuchifritos or cochifritos refers to various fried foods prepared principally of pork in Spanish and Puerto Rican cuisine. In Spain, cuchifritos are a typical dish from Segovia in Castile. The dish consists of pork meat fried in olive oil and garlic and served hot. In Puerto Rican communities in New York City they include a variety of dishes including morcilla (blood sausage), papa rellena (fried potato balls stuffed with meat), and chicharrón (fried pork skin), and other parts of the pig prepared in different ways. Some cuchifritos dishes are prepared using plantain as a primary ingredient. Cuchifritos vendors also typically serve juices and drinks such as passionfruit, pineapple, and coconut juice, as well as ajonjolí, a drink made from sesame seeds.

In Chicago, el jibarito is a popular dish. The word jíbaro in Puerto Rico means a man from the countryside, especially a small landowner or humble farmer from far up in the mountains. Typically served with Puerto Rican yellow rice, jibaritos consist of a meat along with mayonnaise, cheese, lettuce, tomatoes and onions, all sandwiched between a fried green plantain. In the early 20th century, bread made from wheat (which would have to be imported) was expensive out in the mountain towns of the Cordillera Central, and jíbaros were made from plantains which are still grown there on the steep hillsides. The version introduced to Chicago was originally made with skirt steak, but today it can be found in versions made with chicken, roast pork, ham, shrimp and even tofu. La jibarita is the sweet plantain version.

=== Desserts ===
Bizcocho Mojadito is a sponge cake crafted mainly from whipped egg yolks combined with butter, salt, sugar, milk, and a almond paste or extract. The process involves gradually folding in flour and baking powder, creating a smooth batter. Egg whites are whipped to stiff peaks and then gently incorporated for a light texture. Once baked and cooled, the cake is pricked with a fork to create small holes across the surface. A refreshing simple syrup made from lime peel and either brandy or rum is generously poured over the cake, allowing it to soak in flavor. Finally, it is finished with a delicious buttercream frosting infused with almond paste and vanilla.

There are various adaptations of this recipe; some use evaporated milk or sour cream, while others skip milk altogether, resulting in a denser cake. Additionally, some bakers incorporate shortening into the buttercream for added richness. Simple syrup can be replaced with a coquito and adding coconut flakes to the buttercream frosting making this into a coquito cake.

== Chefs ==
- Doreen Colondres - chef, television presenter, food writer and sommelier
- Luis Antonio Cosme – Puerto Rican actor and television chef
- Giovanna Huyke – television chef
- Daisy Martinez – cookbook author and host of Daisy Cooks! on PBS and ¡Viva Daisy! on the Food Network

== Gallery ==
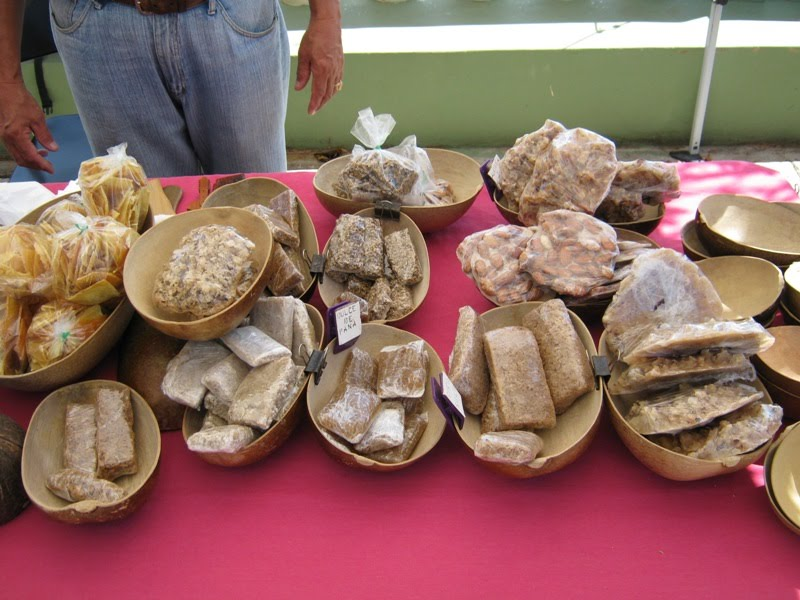
Table with typical sweets in Húcares, Naguabo

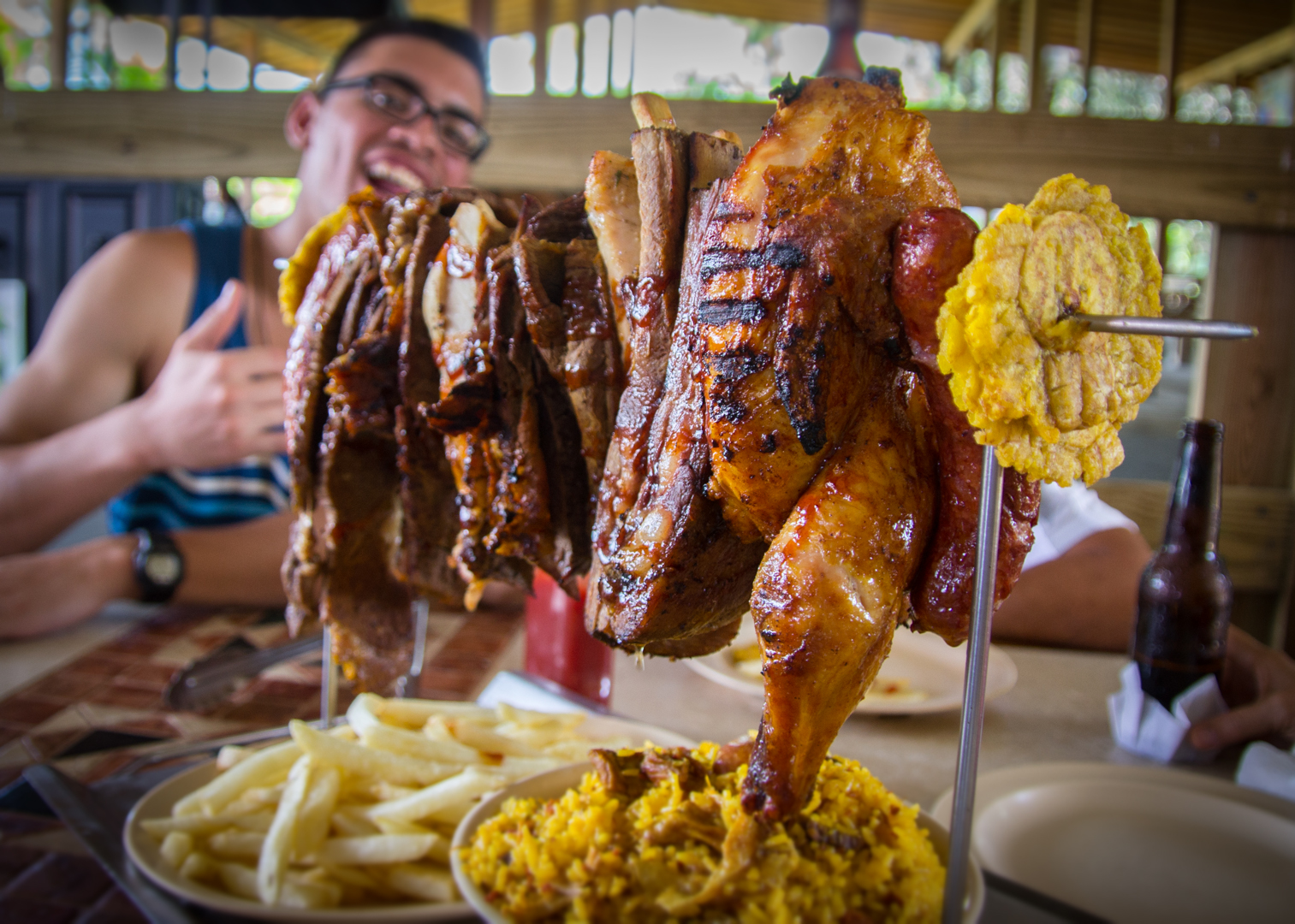
Rotisserie chicken, twice-fried plantain in Ciales, Puerto Rico

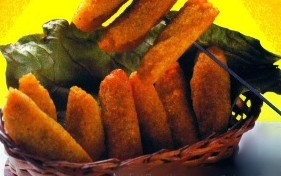
Alcapurrias

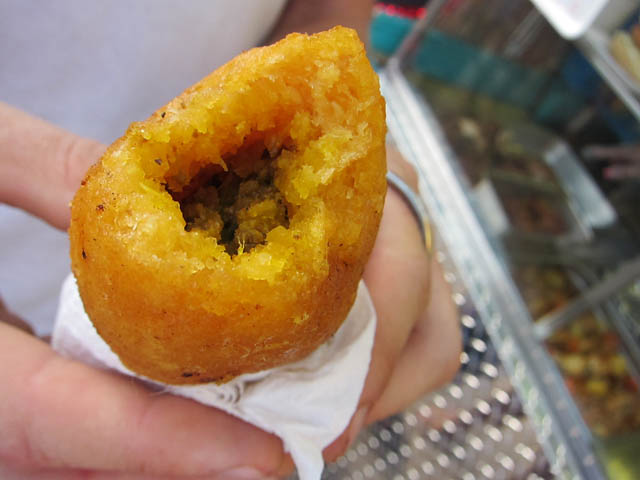
Papa rellena de Puerto Rico

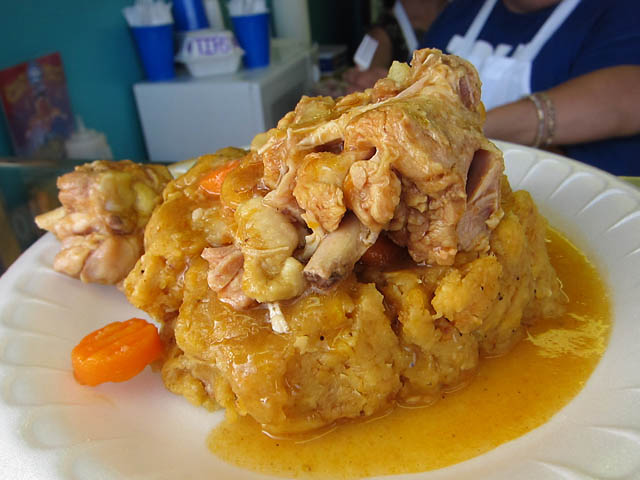
Mofongo, prepared in New York

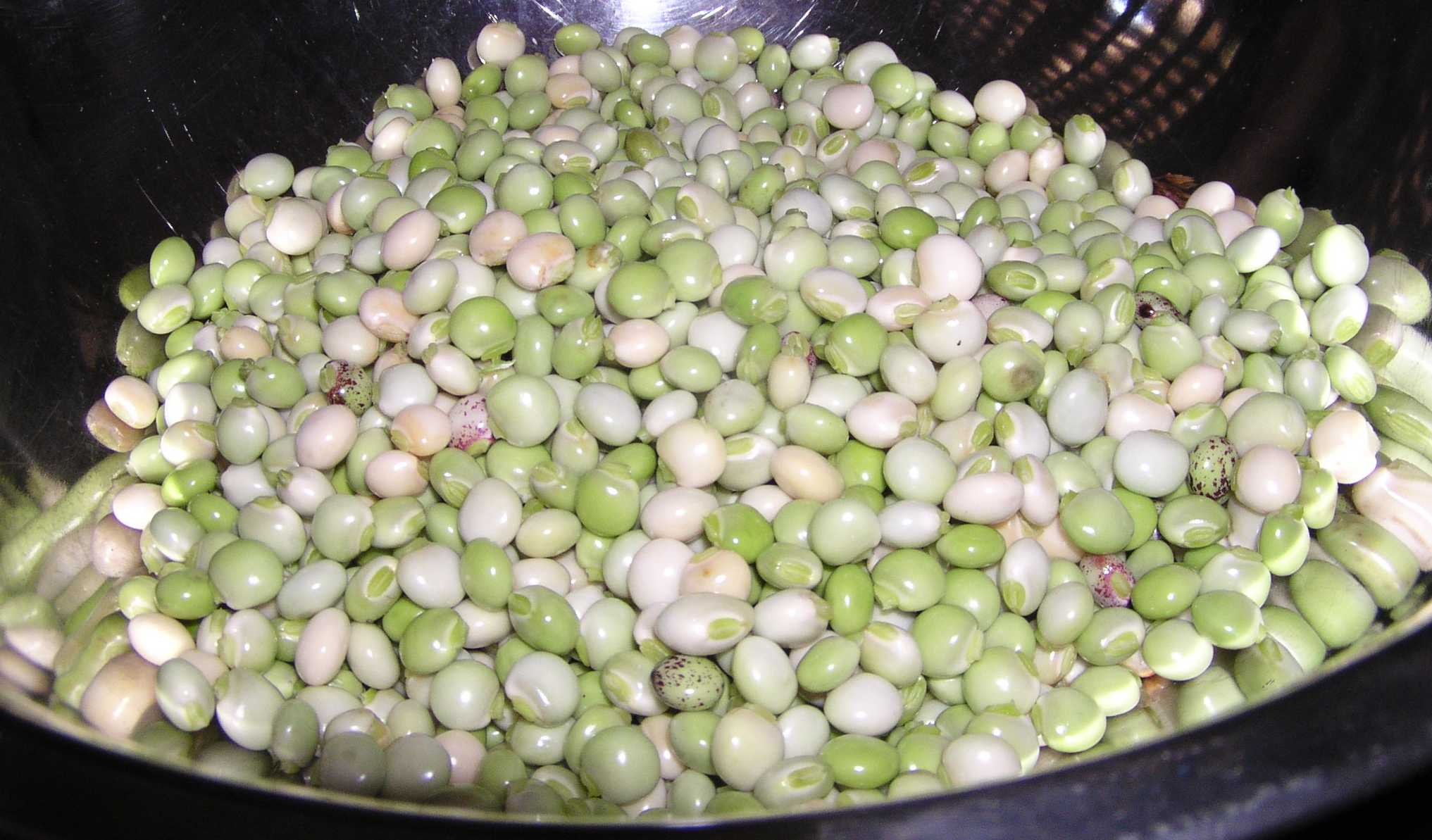
Pigeon peas (gandules)

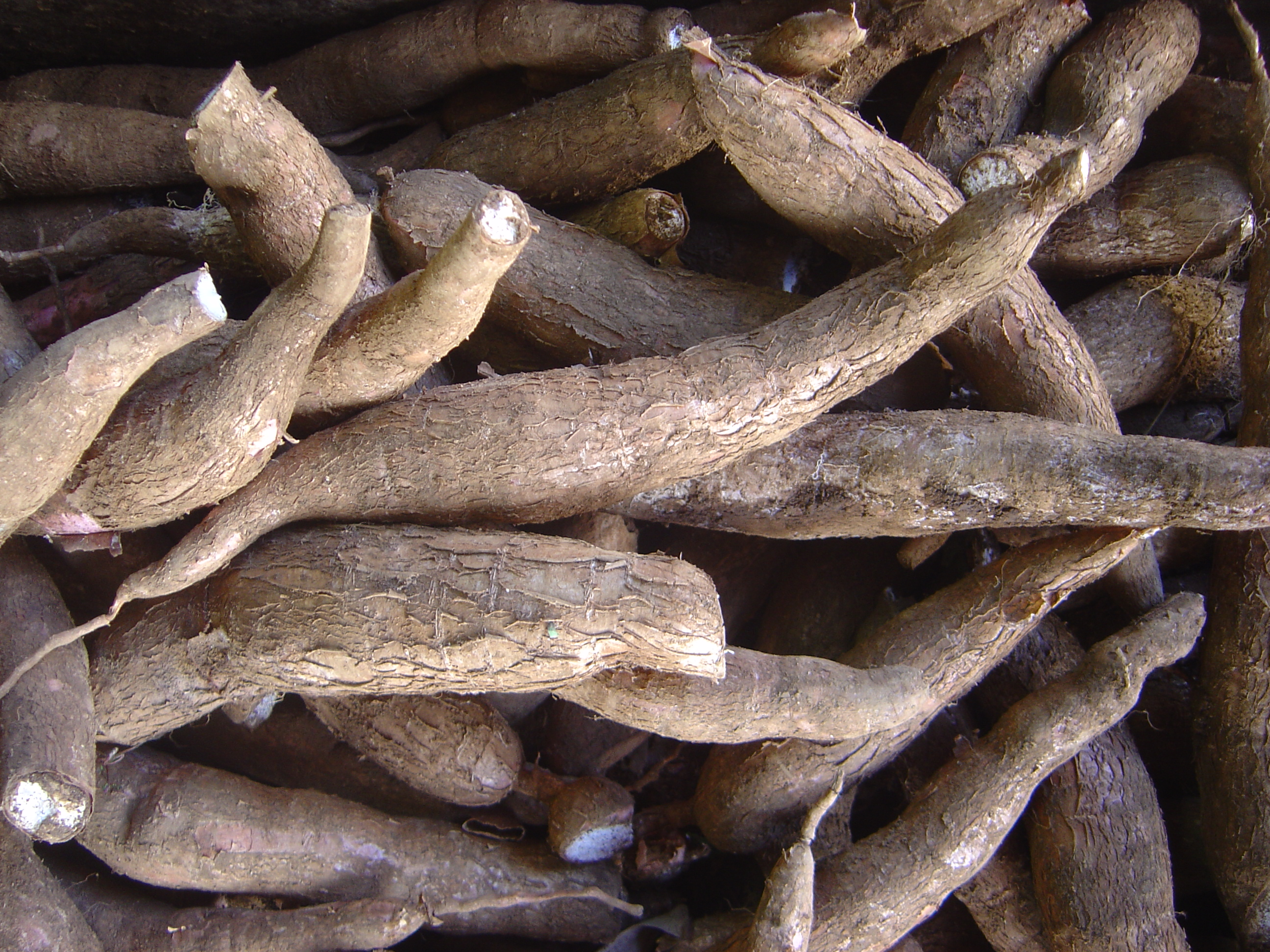
Yuca, Puerto Rican name for cassava

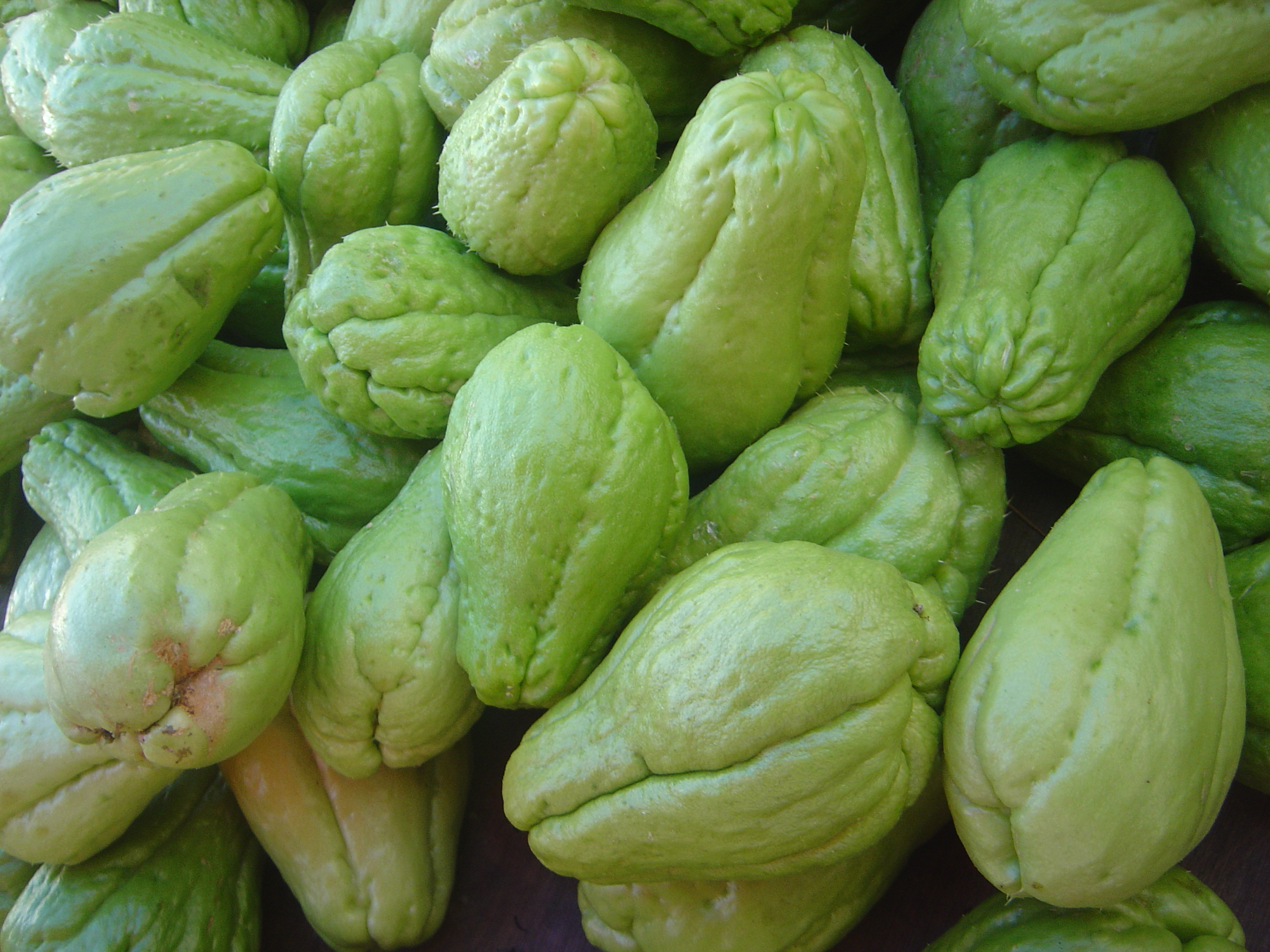
Chayote

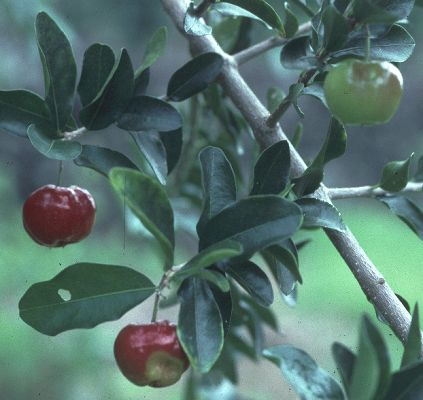
Acerola cherry

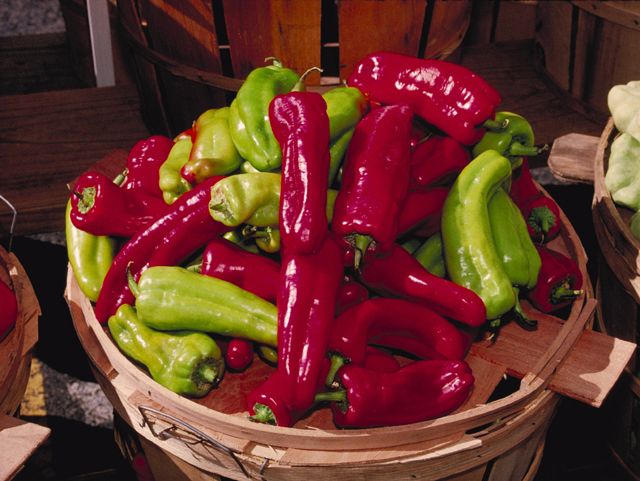
Green and red cubanelle peppers are used to make sofríto

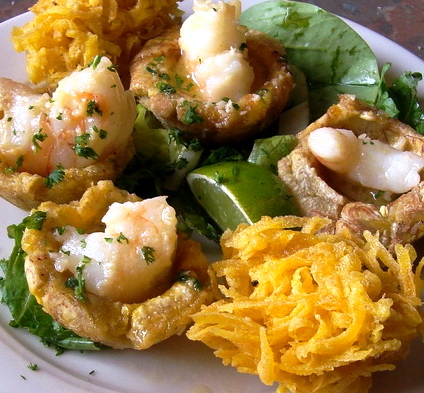
Plantain "arañitas" and "tostones rellenos"

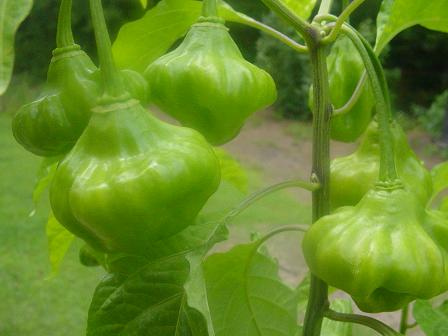
Ajicitos / Cachucha, a.k.a., Ají Dulce, the Habanero chili pepper's mild cousin

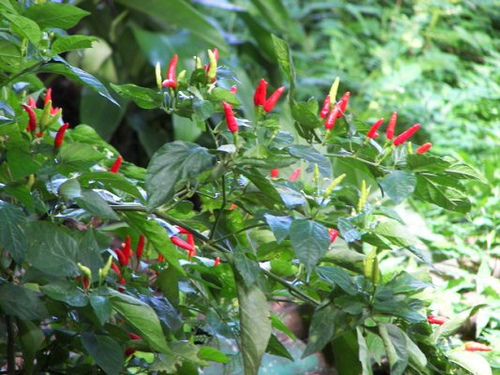
Ají caballero (aka, Puerto Rican Jelly Bean Hot Chili Pepper) is a very hot local pepper

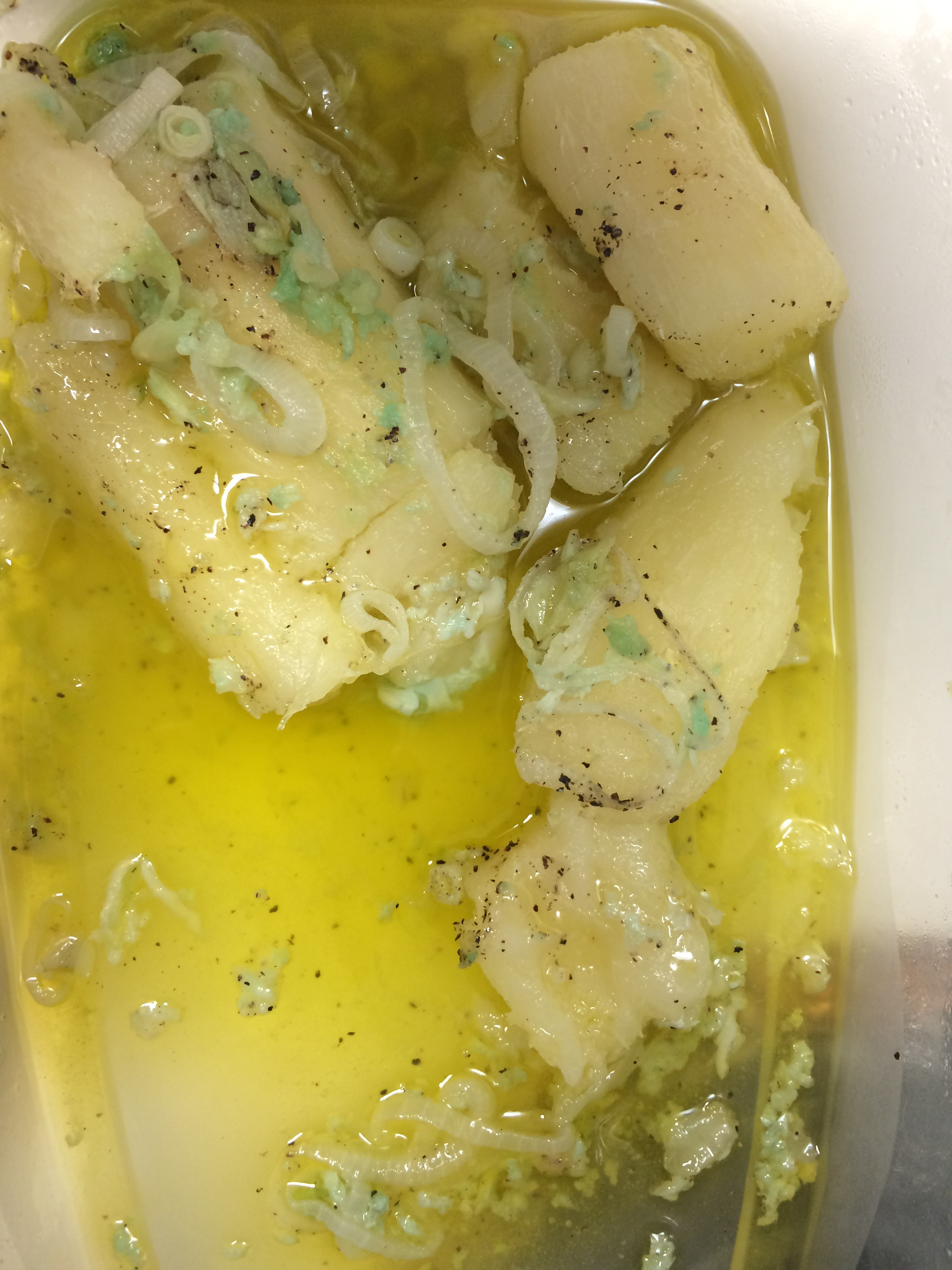
Marinated cassava (Spanish: Yuca en escabeche)

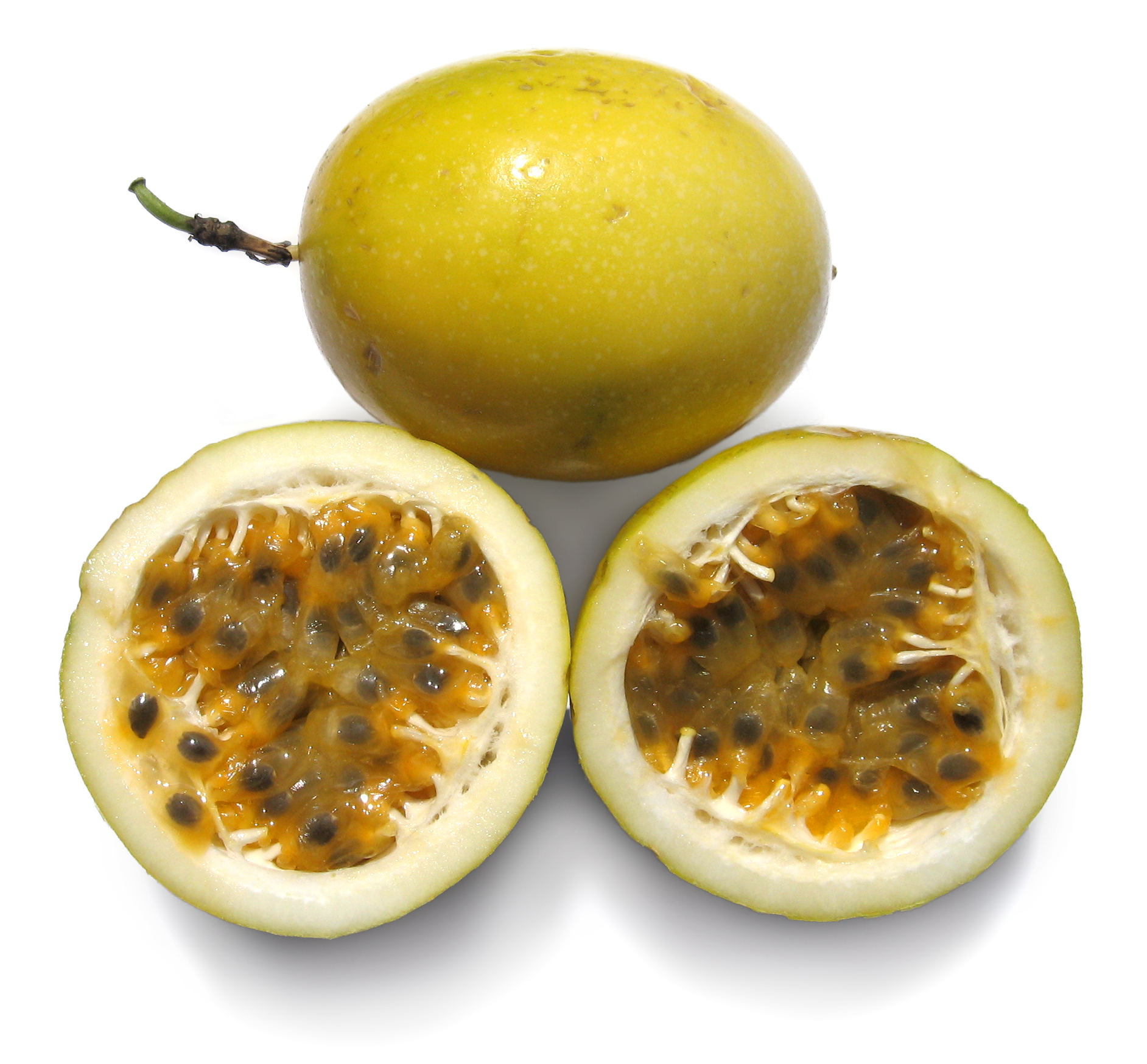
Parcha, passion fruit, is often made into passion fruit juice

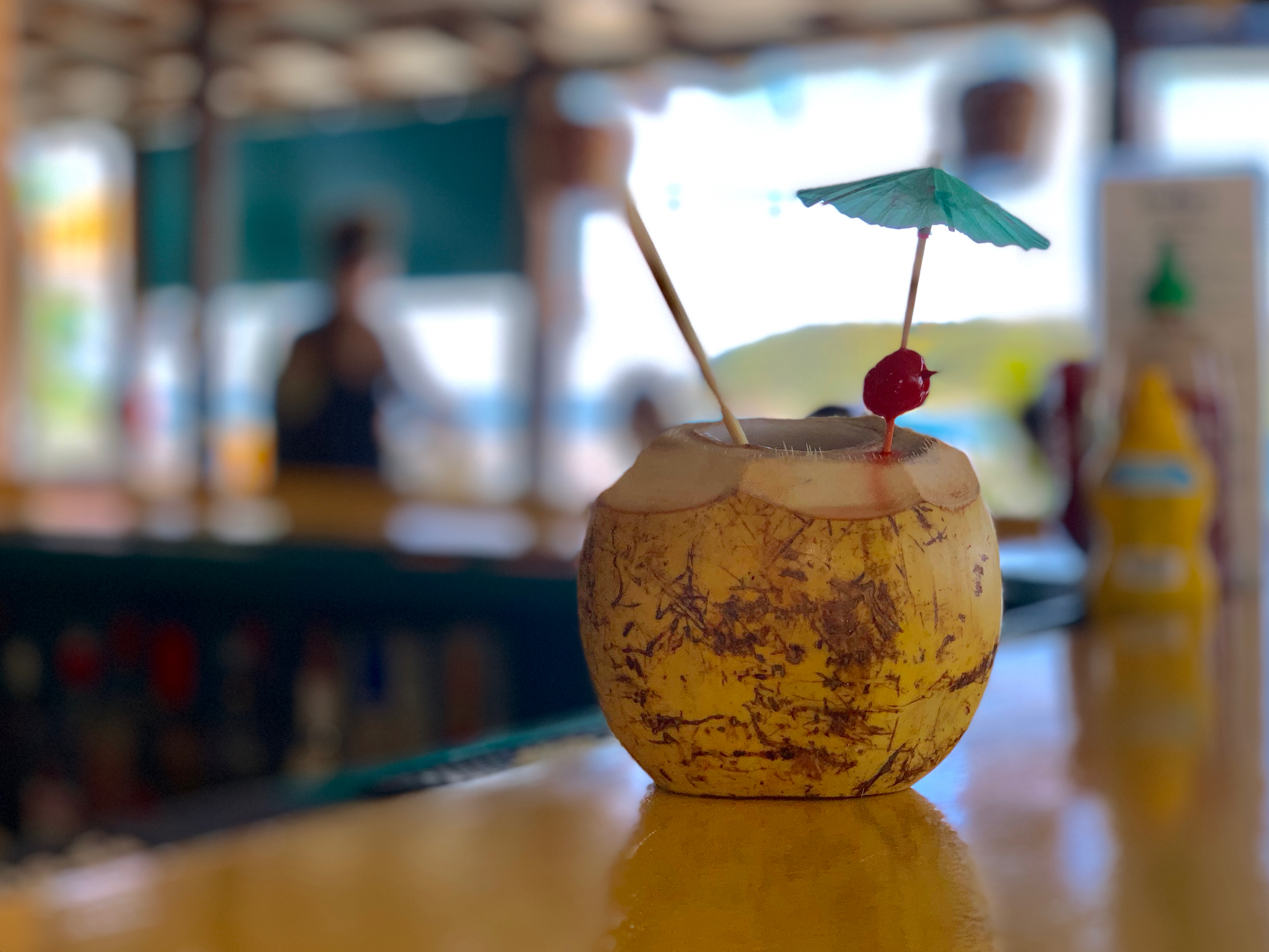
Coconut with straw at restaurant in Esperanza, Vieques

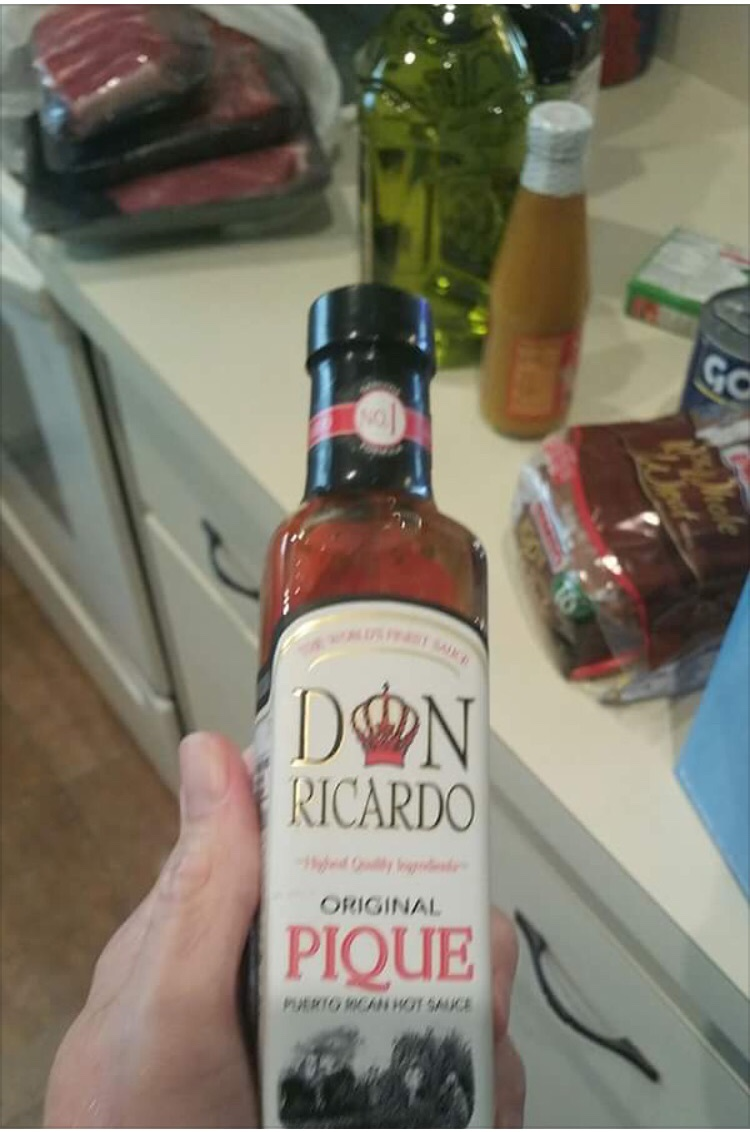
Pique (Puerto Rican Hot Sauce)

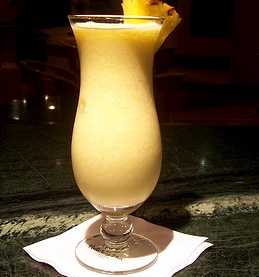
Piña Colada

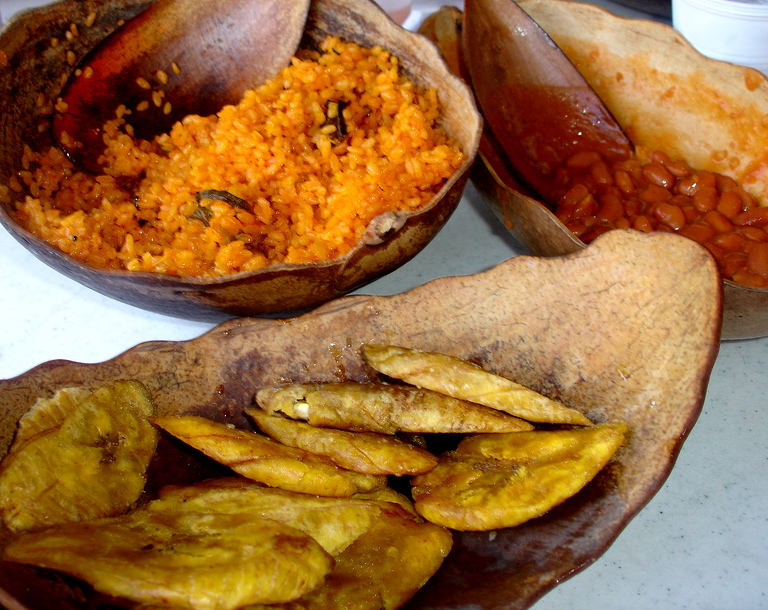
Puerto Rican cooking has a unique blend of influences.

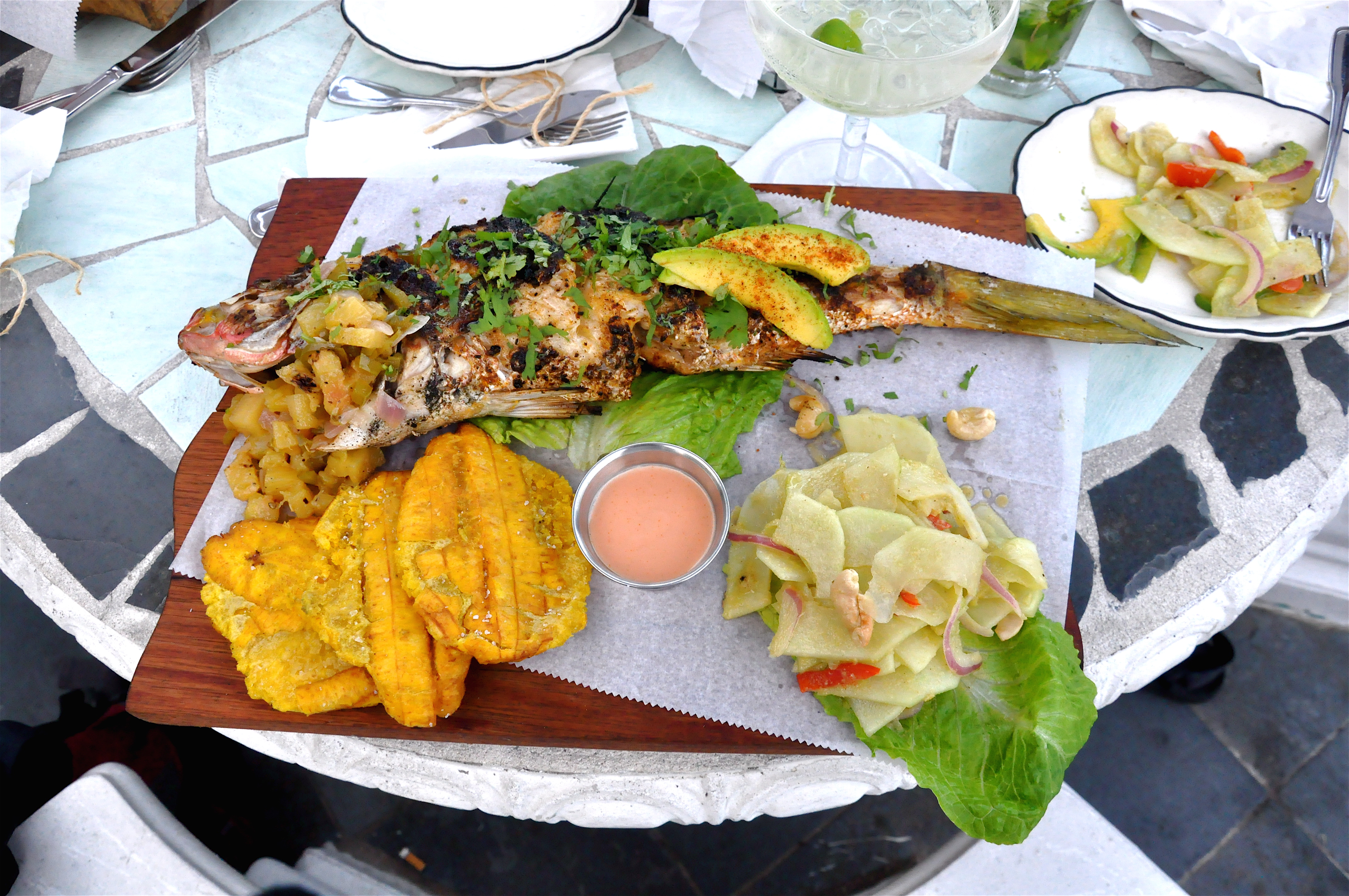
Grilled yellow snapper with green papaya salad and tostones

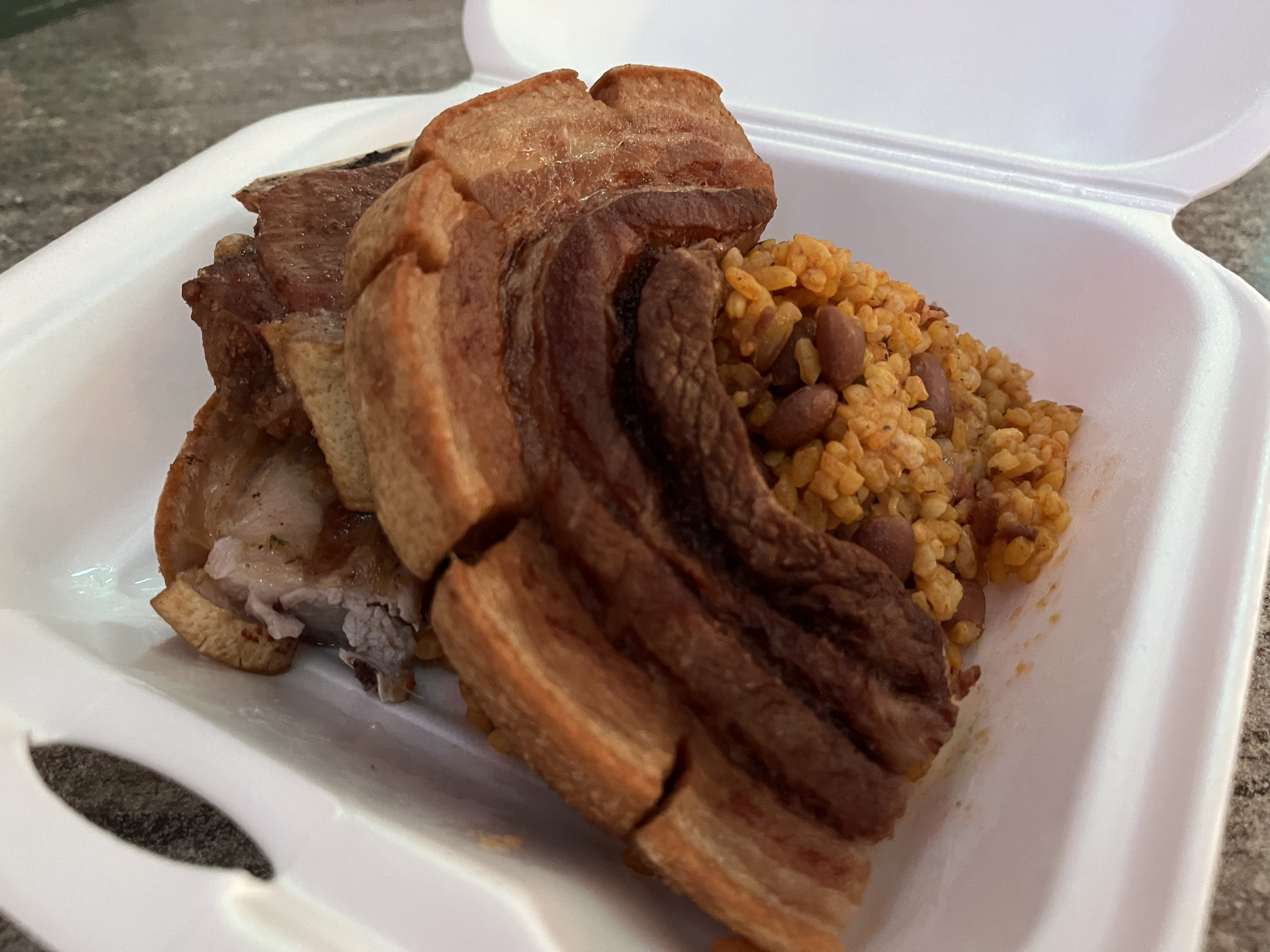
Chuleta Kan Kan and Mamposteao

== See also ==
- Caribbean cuisine
- Coco Lopez
- Piragua
- Puerto Rican Chinese cuisine
