= Arroz junto =

Puerto Rican rice and beans dish

- Course: Main course
- Place of origin: Puerto Rico
- Serving temperature: Hot
- Main ingredients: Rice, legume, sofrito, annatto
- Variations: Locrio, Moros y Cristianos (food)
- Other information: Popular throughout: Caribbean parts of Latin America

Arroz junto (rice together) is a Puerto Rican rice dish cooked with beans and meat in one pot.

== Method ==
Rice, beans, and usually some kind of meat, are combined in the same pot. Sofrito, meat, olives, capers and spices are cooked in annatto oil. Annatto adds flavor and tints the rice a bright orange color. Once sofrito is cooked, rice and beans are added with liquid.

== Variations ==
Some arroz junto dishes are given other names such as arroz con gandules, arroz con maiz y salchichas, arroz con garbanzo y bacalao (rice with chickpeas and salted cod), and arroz bago (rice, chickpeas, and ground meat). Pinto, black or red beans are usually accompanied with smoked ham, longaniza, or bacon. Arroz con pollo is another popular dish that usually has added chorizo and sweet peas.
