= La Mallorquina =

Restaurant in San Juan, Puerto Rico

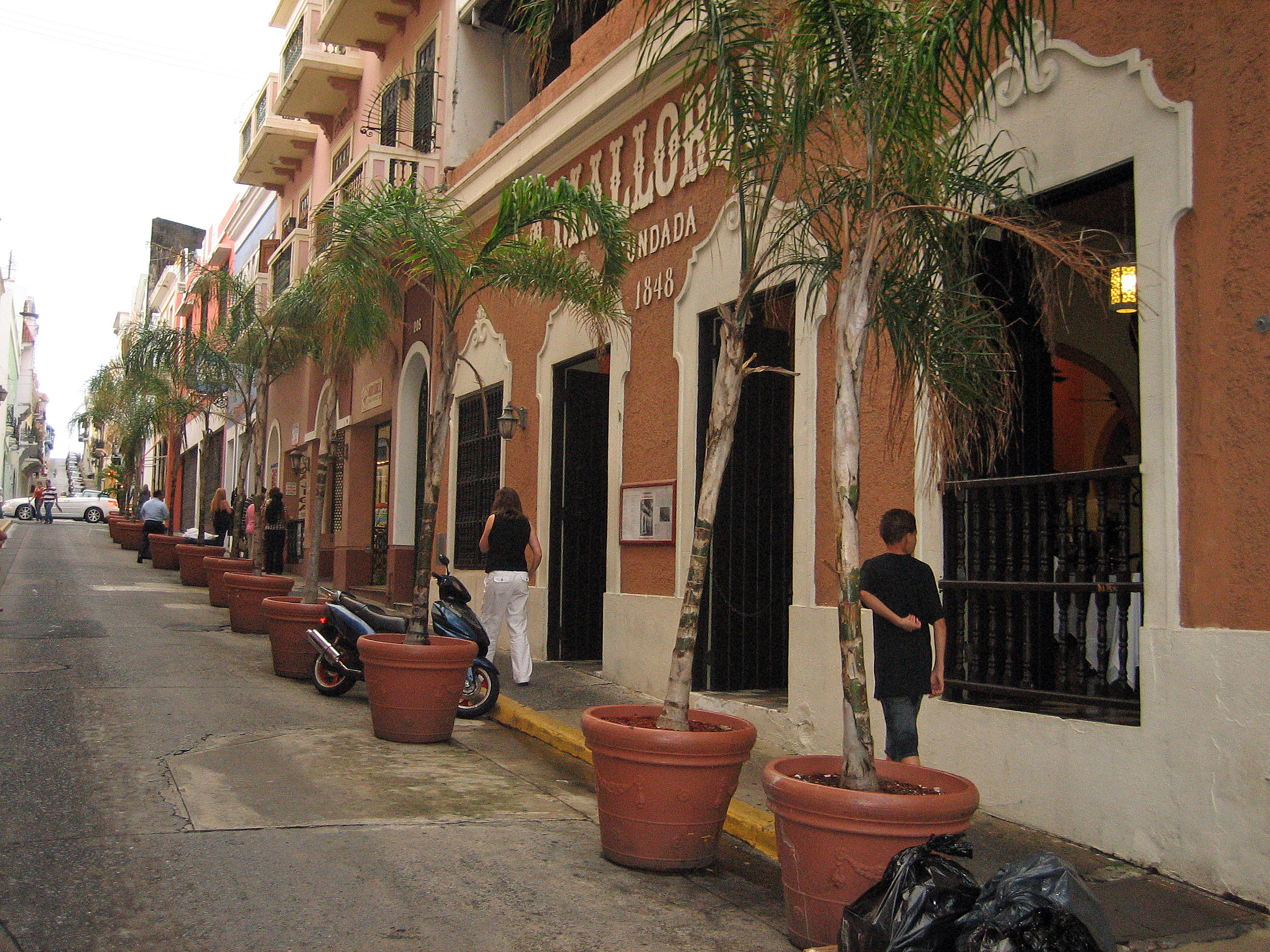
- Interactive map of La Mallorquina

Restaurant information
- Established: 1848
- Owner: Lcda. Maria S. Figueroa Lugo
- Food type: Puerto Rican; Spanish
- Location: 207 Calle San Justo, San Juan, Puerto Rico

La Mallorquina is a restaurant in Old San Juan, San Juan, Puerto Rico that specializes in the making of Puerto Rican and Spanish-particularly Palma de Mallorca-cuisine such as asopao, gazpacho, arroz con pollo, paella and flan.

It opened in 1848 and has been run by the Rojos family since 1900 and Yvonne Ortiz claims that La Mallorquina is the first eating establishment in Puerto Rico. The restaurant's original owners, Antonio Vidal Llinás and others, came from Palma de Mallorca, Spain; that's why they named their restaurant La Mallorquina, which loosely translates into English means The Woman from Mallorca.

Puerto Rico's first elected governor, Luis Muñoz Marín, was also one of the famous people to visit the restaurant.

== See also ==
- Puerto Rican cuisine
- Spanish cuisine
