= La Piraña Lechonera =

Puerto Rican restaurant in New York City, U.S.

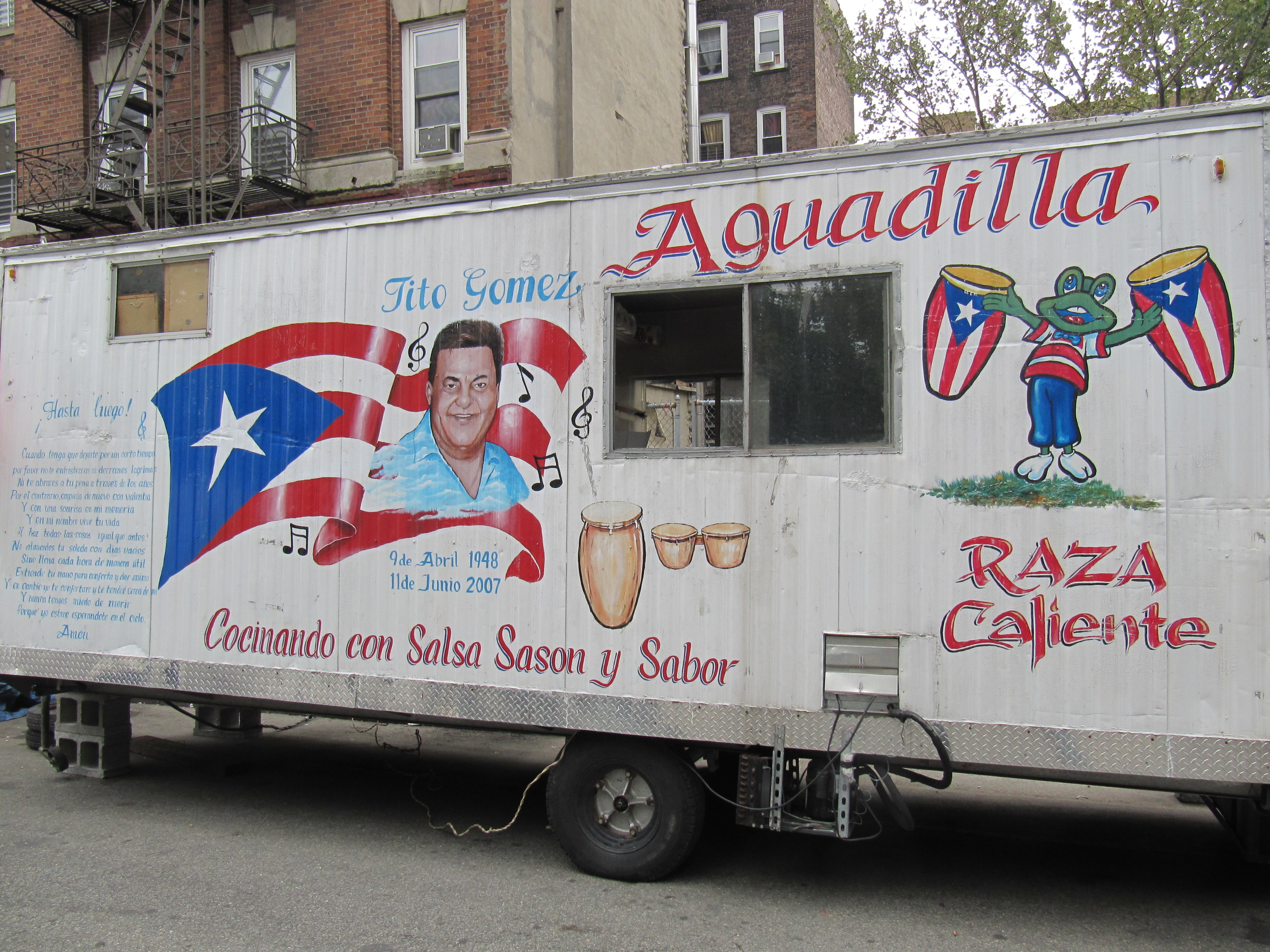
- The rear exterior of La Piraña Lechonera, showing its art and decoration
- Interactive map of La Piraña Lechonera

Restaurant information
- Food type: Puerto Rican
- Location: Bronx, New York, United States
- Coordinates: 40°48′57″N 73°54′23″W

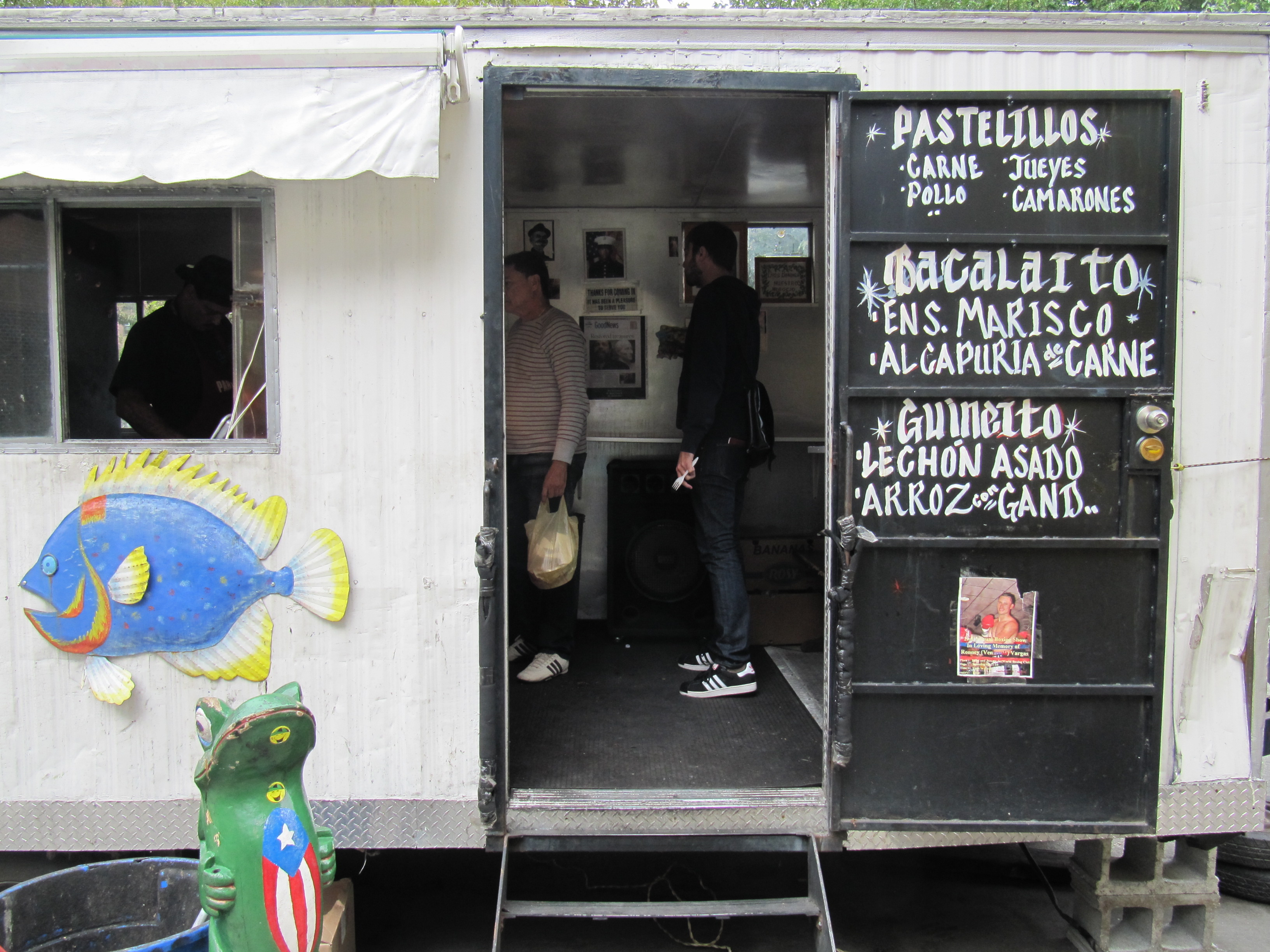
The ordering window and menu

La Piraña Lechonera is a food trailer at East 152nd Street and Wales Avenue in the South Bronx, New York. The restaurant serves Puerto Rican cuisine.
