= Locrio =

Rice dice from the Dominican Republic

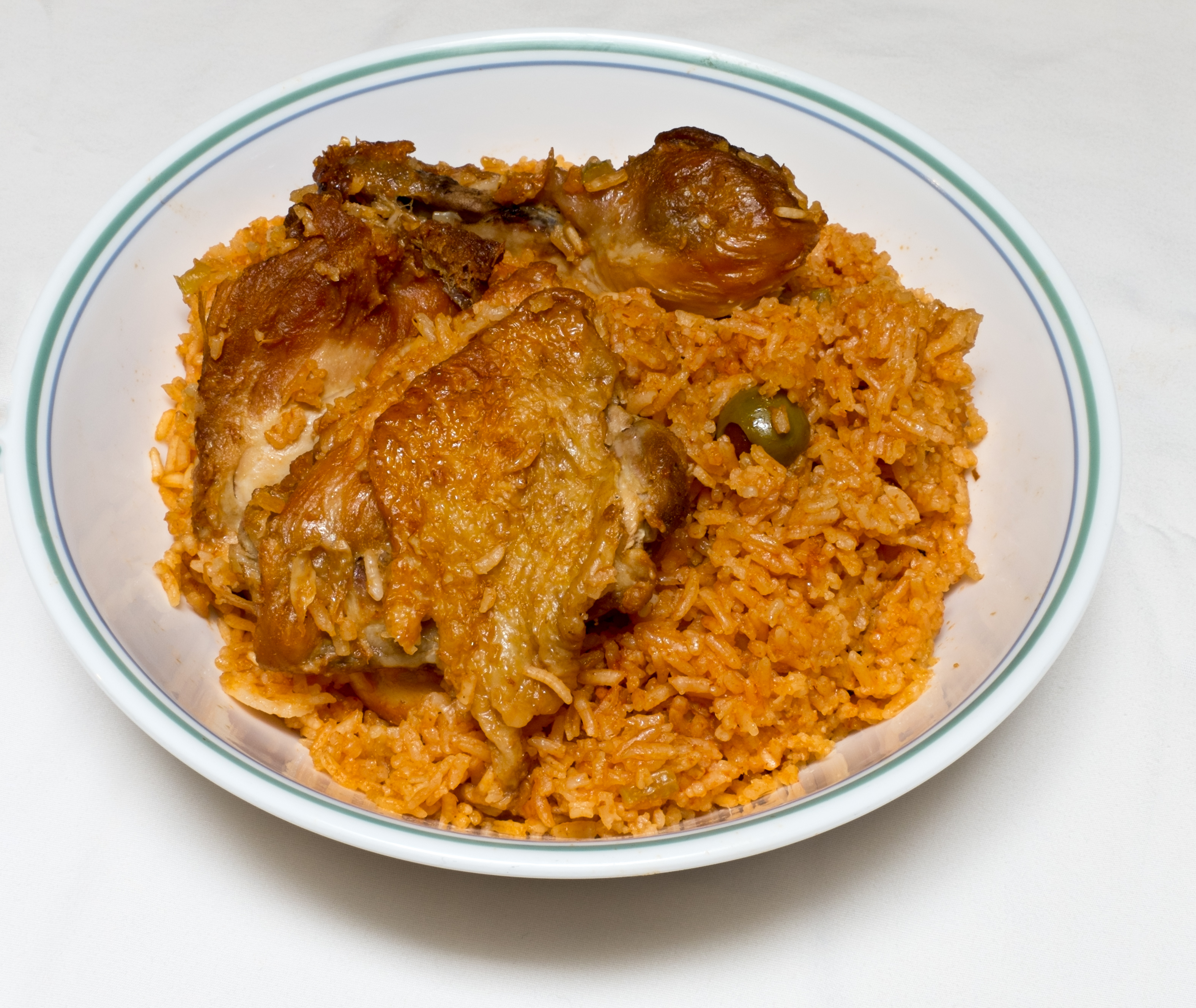
- Course: Main dishes
- Place of origin: Dominican Republic
- Main ingredients: chicken, salami, guineafowl (etc), rice

A locrio is a rice dish from the Dominican Republic. Similar to pilaf, jollof, and paella, it consists of seasoned rice with some kind of meat, such as chicken, Dominican salami or pork.

== Origin ==
The locrio is possibly a Dominican adaptation of paella.

== Types ==
Besides chicken, locrio is also commonly made of Dominican salami, guineafowl, rabbit, pork chops, arenque (dried herring), shellfish, or sardines (often called pica-pica).

== See also ==
- Arroz junto, rice cooked with beans and meat in one pot
- Arroz con gandules, rice with pigeon peas and pork
- Arroz con maiz, rice with corn and sausage
- Arroz con pollo, rice with chicken
