= Asopao =

Stew originating in Puerto Rico

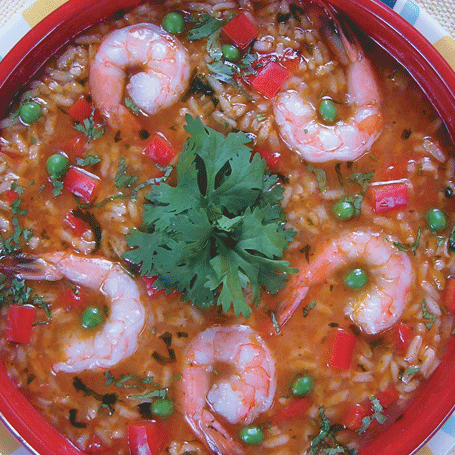
Shrimp asopao

Asopao is a family of stews that can be made with chicken, pork, beef, shrimp seafood, vegetables, or any combination of the above. Asopao is Puerto Rico's national soup and one of the best known gastronomic recipes in Puerto Rico.

== Dominican Republic ==
Versions of asopao are found in many Caribbean locales, including the Dominican Republic, where the addition of chicharrones de pollo (small bits of fried chicken or chicken skin) is characteristic or coconut milk and shrimp.

== Puerto Rico ==
A version said to be based on the Spanish rice dish arroz a la valenciana includes chicken, rabbit and a variety of seafood cooked in sherry wine.

The chicken version (asopao de pollo) is usually served with plantain dumplings. It is a common holiday dish for Christmas, and during Octavitas and Los Tres Reyes Magos celebrations. Asopao de pollo can also include beer, smoked ham, ham hock, corn on the cob with more smoky seasoning, cumin, annatto and coriander seeds.

Asopao de marisco includes clams, shrimp, squid, octopus, fish, lobster, crab, scallops, and mussels.

Asopao de gandules replaces rice with pigeon peas. The meat is usually a mix of longaniza, oxtail, and smoked meats; when done, roasted pork is placed on top of the soup. Squash and plantain dumplings are often included in the soup.

The plantain dumplings that are popular with asopao de pollo and asopao de gandules are made from root vegetables, breadfruit, green banana, plantains, milk, eggs and rice flour or cornmeal. The dumplings are made into golf-sized balls and often seasoned with spices and herbs. They can be prepared a day in advance and fried.

Asopao is typically flavored with wine, broth, bay leaf and oregano, along with sofrito, olives, and capers; rice is the most important part. The stew is garnished with sweet peas and served with mojito isleño, bread, tostones and avocado.

== In media ==
Asopao is mentioned in "Caribbean Conspiracy" by Brenda Conrad, about a story that takes place in Puerto Rico which was published in 1942 and printed as a weekly series in dozens of U.S. newspapers in 1943.

Asopao is revealed as Dr. Hugh Culber's favorite dish in Season 2 Episode 8 of Star Trek: Discovery.

Asopao is made by the Puerto Rican sisters in the CW show Charmed.
