= Ají dulce =

Sweet perennial peppers found in Latin America and the Caribbean

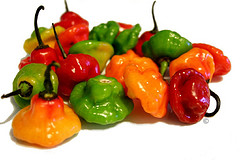
- Puerto Rican ajicitos
- Species: Capsicum chinense
- Origin: Latin America and the Caribbean
- Heat: Mild
- Scoville scale: 0–500 SHU

Ají dulce, ají cachucha, quechucha, ajicito, or ají gustoso is any of a variety of sweet perennial peppers found in Latin America and the Caribbean. It is most widely known in Cuba, Jamaica, Puerto Rico, Dominican Republic and Venezuela, where it refers to a specific native variety of Capsicum chinense that is related to the habanero but with a much milder, smoky flavor. In the English-speaking Caribbean, it is known as seasoning pepper and is essential to a variety of traditional dishes.

== Name ==
In South American Spanish, ají [aˈxi] means 'chili pepper' and dulce [ˈdulse] means 'sweet', so the name translates to 'sweet chili pepper'. Cachucha is the Latin American Spanish word for 'cap', so ají cachucha means 'cap chili pepper' and refers to its cap-like shape. Gustoso means 'tasty', so ají gustoso translates to 'tasty chili pepper'. Ajicito is the diminutive of ají and translates to 'little chili pepper'.

== Use in cooking ==
In Venezuelan cuisine, ají dulce is a key ingredient in many traditional dishes, like the national dish pabellón criollo. The Venezuelan ají dulce is classified as non pungent, between 100 and 500 in the Scoville scale.

In the Dominican Republic it is known as "aji gustoso". In Cuba, it is known as ají Cachucha.

In Puerto Rico where it is called ají dulce or ajicito, it is grown commercially and used for sauces, such as recaíto, sofrito, and mojito isleño, other fish or meat sauces, as well as stews, rice, and other local dishes.

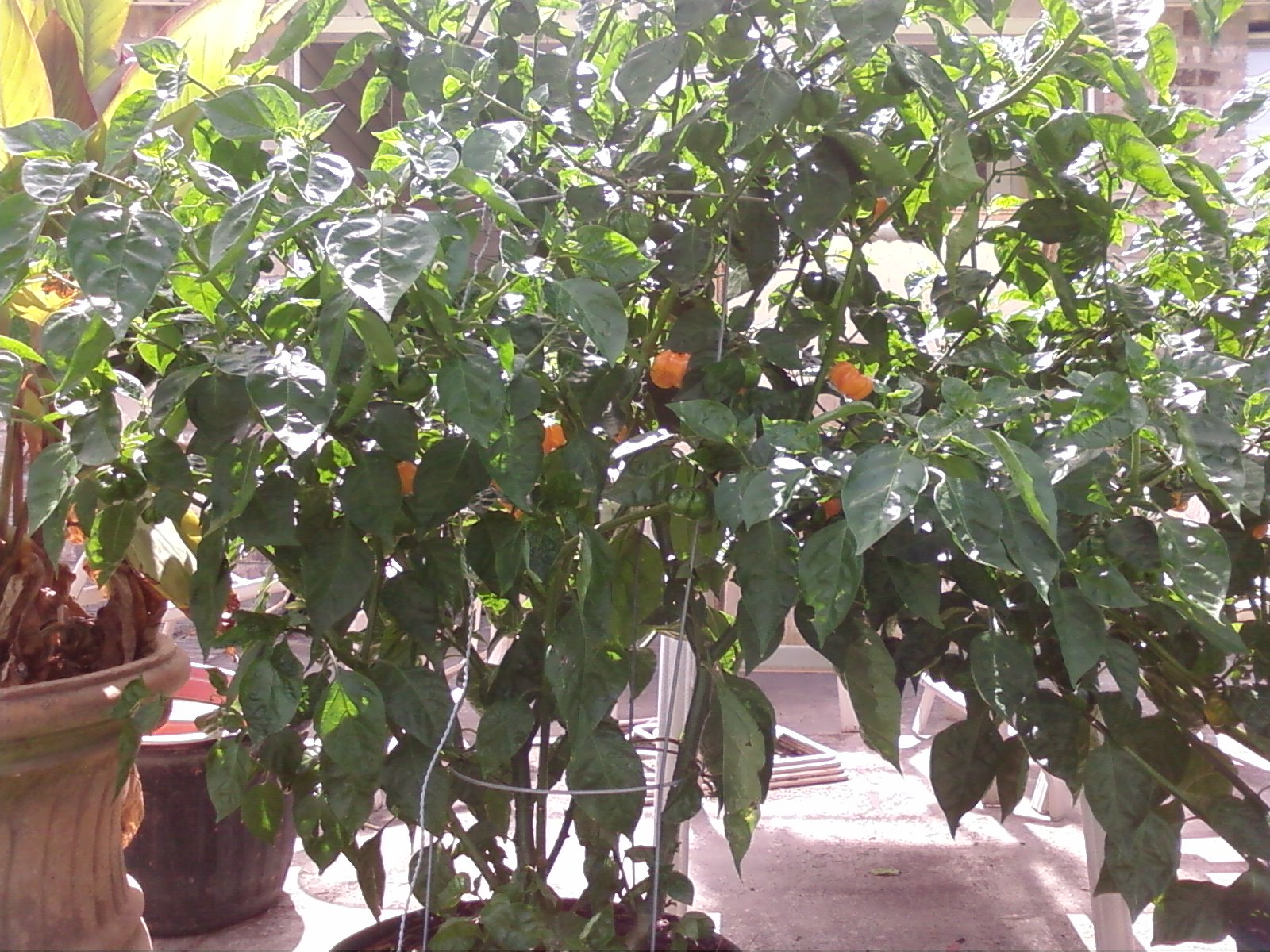

== See also ==
- Ají pepper, a spicier pepper
- List of Capsicum cultivars
