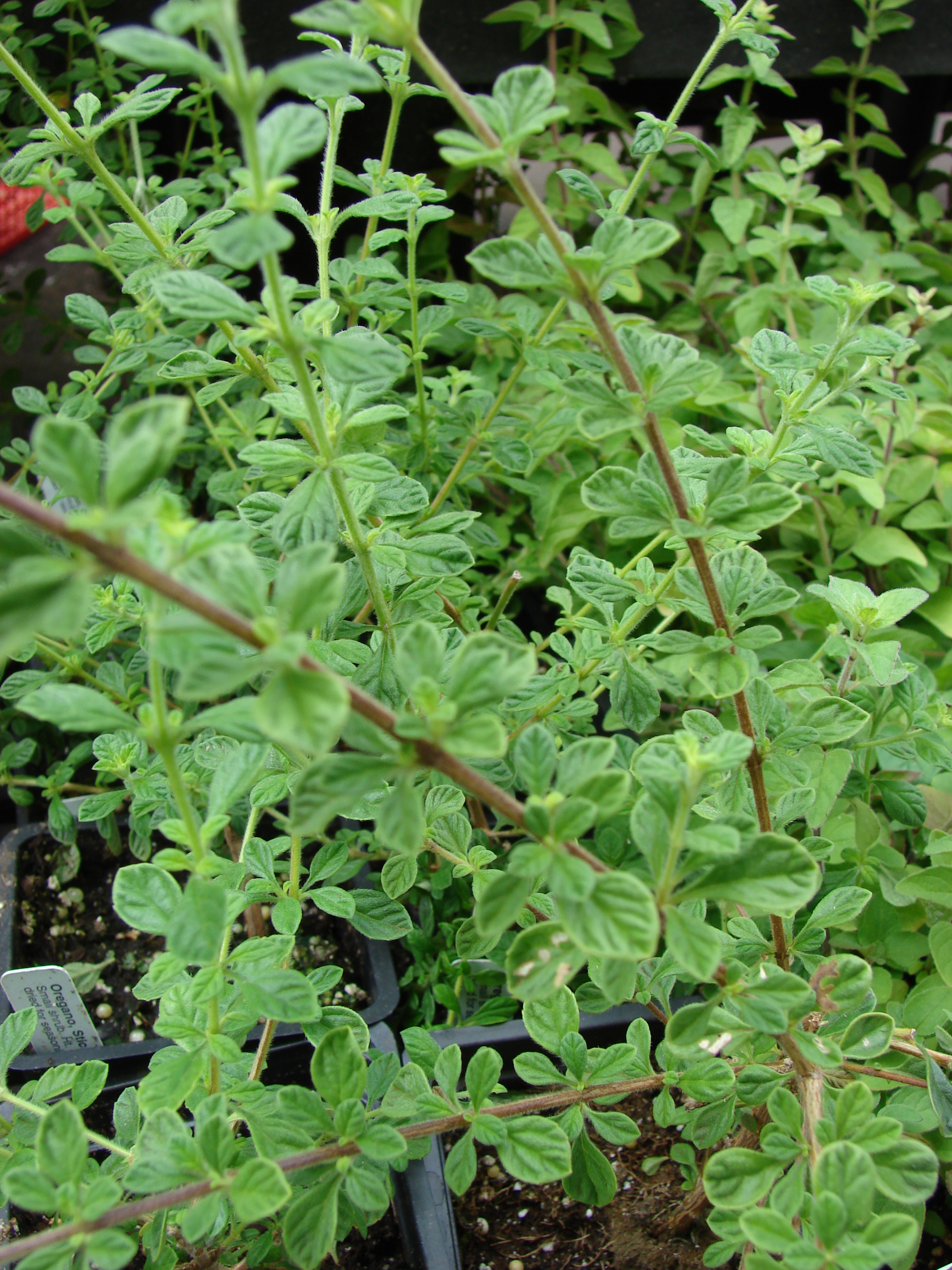

Scientific classification
- Kingdom: Plantae
- Clade: Embryophytes
- Clade: Tracheophytes
- Clade: Spermatophytes
- Clade: Angiosperms
- Clade: Eudicots
- Clade: Asterids
- Order: Lamiales
- Family: Verbenaceae
- Genus: Lippia
- Species: L. micromera

Binomial name
- Lippia micromera Schauer

= Lippia micromera =

Species of flowering plant

Lippia micromera, commonly referred to as stick oregano or false oregano, is a plant species. It is used in regional cuisines including Puerto Rican cuisine and Dominican cuisine. It has white flowers.

It is in the Verbena family. It has aromatic leaves. It is used for medicinal purposes.

It is grown in the Caribbean. and Hawaii.

== See also ==
- Coleus amboinicus, another plant referred to as false oregano
