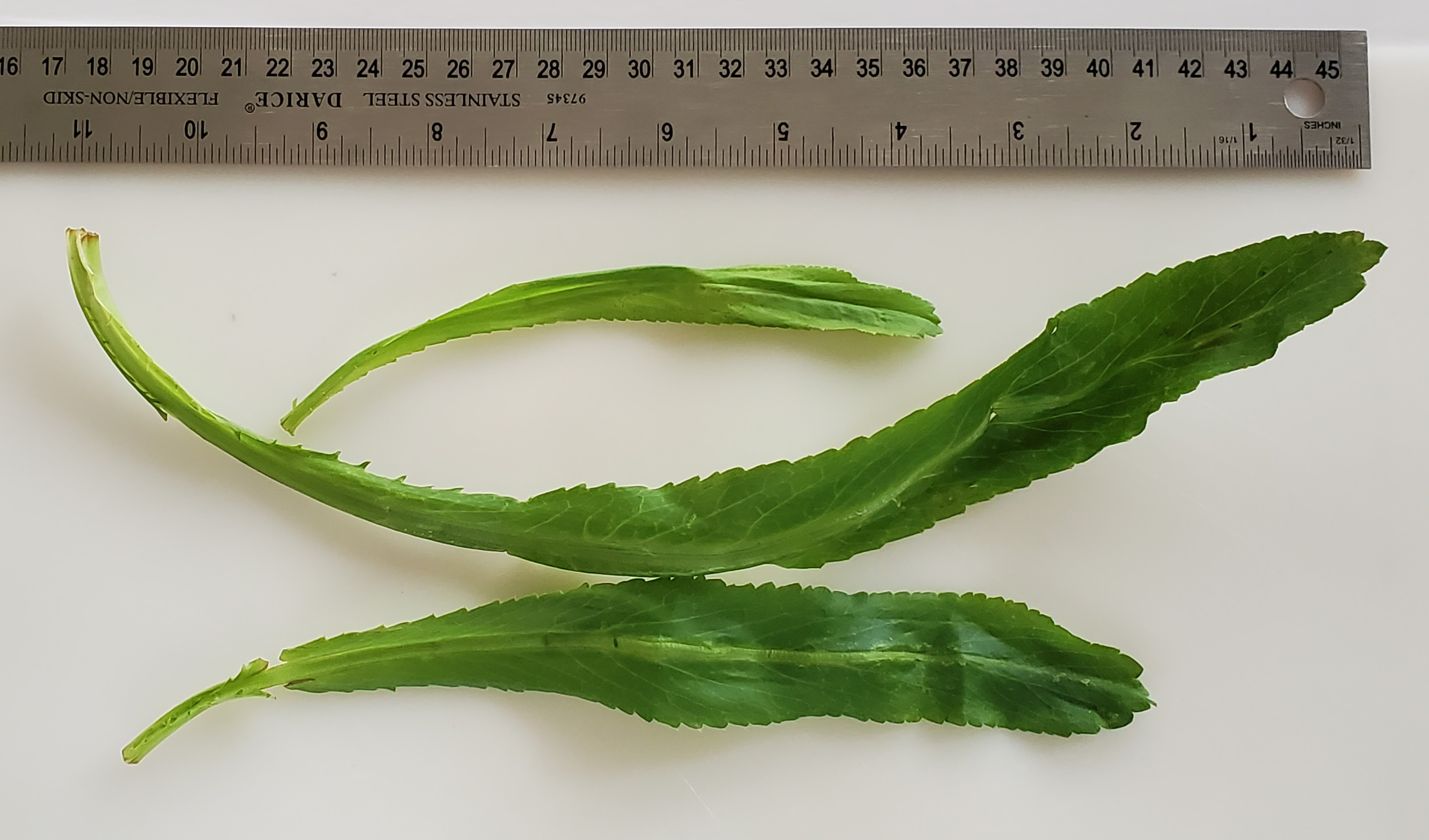
- Eryngium foetidum leaves, with a US ruler for scale

Scientific classification
- Kingdom: Plantae
- Clade: Tracheophytes
- Clade: Angiosperms
- Clade: Eudicots
- Clade: Asterids
- Order: Apiales
- Family: Apiaceae
- Genus: Eryngium
- Species: E. foetidum

Binomial name
- Eryngium foetidum L.

Synonyms
- Eryngium antihystericum Rottler

= Eryngium foetidum =

Culantro

Species of flowering plant in the celery family

Eryngium foetidum is a tropical perennial herb in the family Apiaceae. Common names include culantro (Panama) or culantro coyote (Costa Rica) (/kuːˈlɑːntroʊ/ or /kuːˈlæntroʊ/), cimarrón, recao (Puerto Rico), chardon béni (Martinique), Mexican coriander, samat, bandhaniya (Trinidad and Tobago), long coriander, wide coriander, Burmese coriander, sawtooth coriander, Chadon Beni/Shadow Beni (Trinidad and Tobago), and ngò gai (Vietnam). It is native to Mexico, the Caribbean, and Central and South America, but is cultivated worldwide, mostly in the tropics as a perennial, but sometimes in temperate climates as an annual. In India it is called "Mandhonia", specifically in the Northeast.

In the United States, the common name culantro sometimes causes confusion with cilantro, a common name for the leaves of Coriandrum sativum (also in Apiaceae but in a different genus), of which culantro is said to taste like a stronger version.

== Uses ==
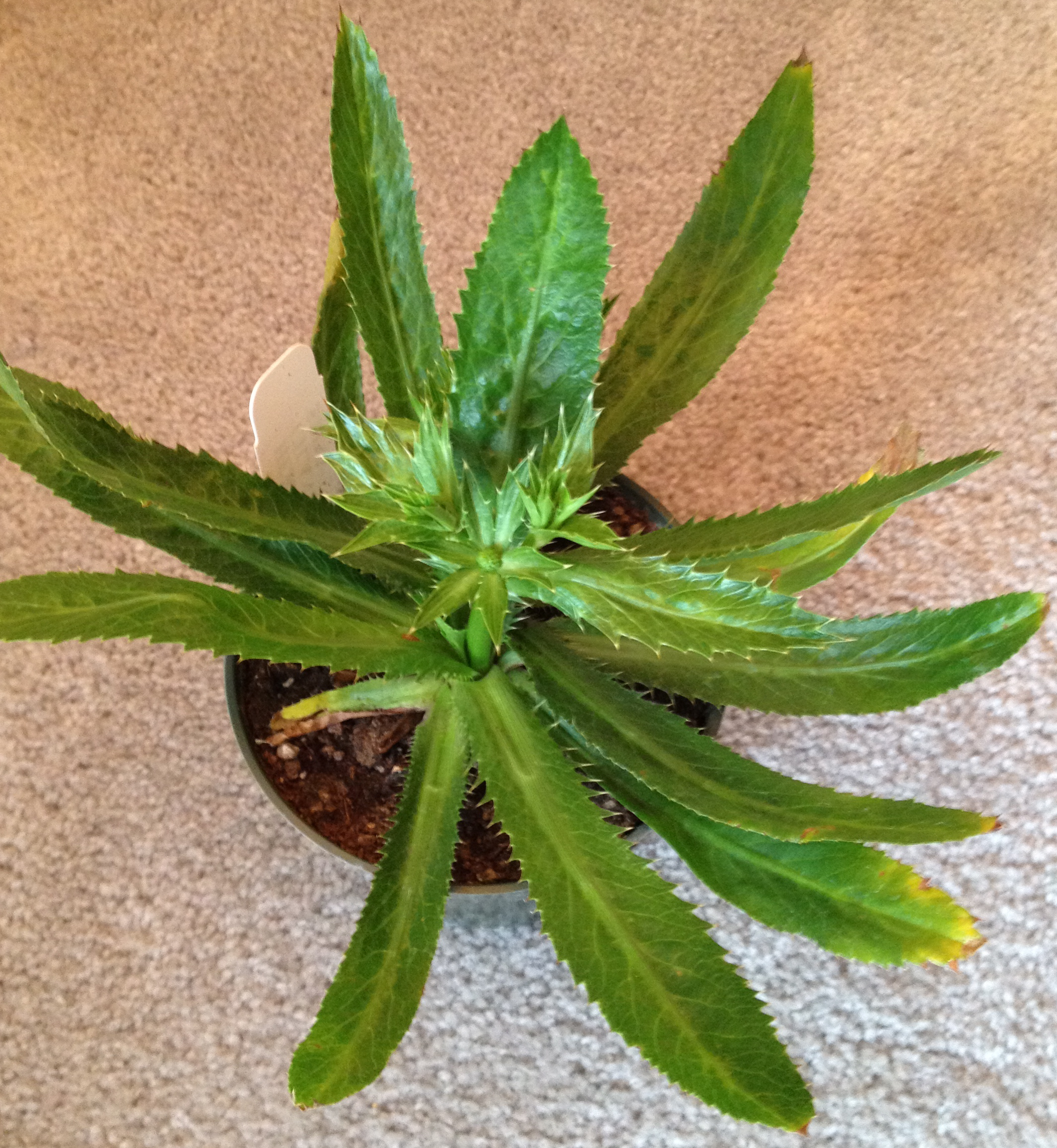
Eryngium foetidum plant with leaves and young inflorescence

=== Culinary ===
Eryngium foetidum is widely used in seasoning, marinating and garnishing in the Caribbean (particularly in Cuba, the Dominican Republic, Haiti, Puerto Rico, and Trinidad and Tobago), as well as Guatemala, El Salvador, Honduras, Nicaragua, Panama, Costa Rica, Ecuador, Colombia and also at Brazil and Peru's Amazonian regions. It is also used extensively as a culinary herb in the North-Eastern States of India (Tripura, Mizoram, Meghalaya, Assam, Nagaland, Manipur, Arunachal Pradesh and Sikkim), Cambodia [where it is called Chi Banla, Chi baraing ជីរបន្លា, ជីរបារាំង], Thailand, India, Nepal, Vietnam, Laos, Myanmar, Bangladesh, southwestern China and other parts of tropical Asia. It is sometimes used as a substitute for coriander leaves, but has a stronger, tangier taste. Unlike coriander, Eryngium foetidum dries well, retaining good color and flavor, which makes it valuable in the dried herb industry.

In the United States, E. foetidum grows naturally in Florida, Georgia, Hawaii, Puerto Rico, and the Virgin Islands.

The flower heads are not edible.

=== Traditional medicine ===
Eryngium foetidum has been used in traditional medicine in tropical regions for burns, earache, fevers, hypertension, constipation, fits, asthma, stomachache, worms, infertility complications, snake bites, diarrhea, and malaria.

Eryngium foetidum is also known as E. antihystericum. The specific name antihystericum reflects the fact that this plant has traditionally been used for epilepsy. The plant is said to calm a person's 'spirit' and thus prevents epileptic 'fits', so is known by the common names spiritweed and fitweed. The anticonvulsant properties of this plant have been scientifically investigated. A decoction of the leaves has been shown to exhibit anti-inflammatory and analgesic effects in rats.

Eryngial (trans-2-dodecenal) is the main constituent of essential oil of E. foetidum. The University of the West Indies at Mona, Jamaica, has investigated the use of eryngial as a treatment for human Strongyloides stercoralis infection (strongyloidiasis).

It is used as an ethnomedicinal plant for the treatment of a number of ailments such as chills, vomiting, burns, fevers, hypertension, headaches, earache, stomachache, asthma, arthritis, snake bites, scorpion stings, diarrhea, malaria and epilepsy. A pharmacological investigation claims to have demonstrated anthelmintic, anti-inflammatory, analgesic, anticonvulsant, anticlastogenic, anticarcinogenic, antidiabetic, and antibacterial activity.

=== Chemistry ===
Qualitative analysis of the leaves demonstrated the presence of tannins and saponin, as well as some flavonoids; no alkaloids have been reported yet. Caffeic acid, chlorogenic acid, and kaempferol have been among the phenolic compounds found in E. foetidum leaves.

== See also ==
- Cuban cuisine
- Cuisine of the Dominican Republic
- List of culinary herbs and spices
- Mizo cuisine
- Puerto Rican cuisine
- Thai cuisine
- Trinidad and Tobago cuisine
- Vietnamese cuisine
