= Mojito isleño =

Puerto Rican condiment

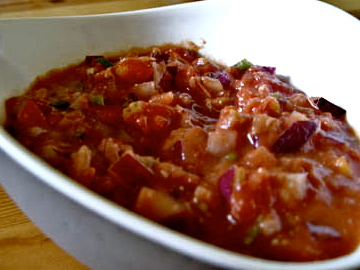
Mojito isleño

Mojito isleño, or mojo isleño, is a Puerto Rican condiment.

== Preparation ==
The sauce is made with vinegar, olive oil, olives, capers, tomato, onion, garlic, bay leaves, culantro, and chili peppers. The mixture is cooked on the stovetop for up to 20 minutes. In some regions basil, wine, coconut milk and a small amount of mashed pigeon peas or kidney beans are added to thicken the sauce. It is used as a topping for fish and shellfish.

== Origin ==
The dish originated in Salinas, Puerto Rico.

== See also ==
- Spaghetti alla puttanesca, an Italian pasta dish with similar ingredients in its sauce
