= Sofrito =

Cooked vegetable foundation for cooking

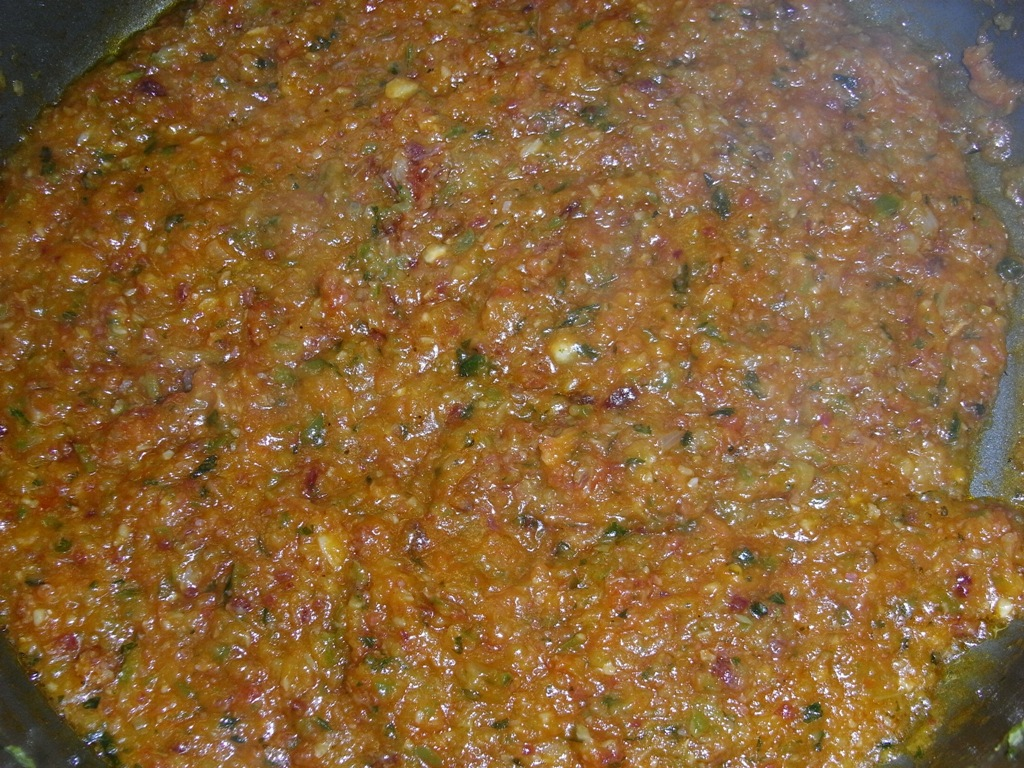
- Sofrito being prepared in Spain
- Region or state: Latin American, Spanish, Italian and Portuguese
- Main ingredients: Garlic, onion, peppers, and tomatoes
- Ingredients generally used: Olive oil

Sofrito (Spanish: [soˈfɾito]), sofregit (Catalan: [sufɾəˈʒit]), soffritto (Italian: [sofˈfritto]), sofrit (French: [sofʁi]), refogado (Portuguese: [ʁɨfuˈɣaðu]) or sueztitze (Basque: [s̺ues̻ˈtits̻e]) typically consists of aromatic ingredients cut into small pieces and sautéed or braised in cooking oil for a long period of time over low heat, then used as a foundation for a variety of dishes. It is a basic preparation in Mediterranean and Latin American cooking.

The word sofrito derives from the Spanish verb sofreír, meaning 'to stir-fry'.

== Mediterranean ==
The earliest mentioned recipe of sofrito, from around the middle of the 14th century, was made with only onion and oil.

In modern Spanish cuisine, sofrito consists of garlic, onion, and peppers cooked in olive oil, and optionally tomatoes or carrots. This is known as refogado, sufrito, or sometimes as estrugido in Portuguese-speaking nations, where only garlic, onions, and olive oil are considered essential, tomato and bay laurel leaves being the other most common ingredients.

In Italian cuisine, chopped onions, carrots, and celery is battuto, and then, slowly cooked in olive oil, it becomes soffritto. It may also contain garlic, shallot, or leek.

In Greek cuisine, sofrito is a dish that is found almost exclusively in Corfu. It is served less commonly in other regions of Greece and is often referred to as 'Corfu sofrito' outside of Corfu. It is made with veal or beef, slowly cooked with garlic, wine, herbs, sugar, and vinegar to produce an umami sauce with softened meat. It is usually served with rice and potatoes.

== Latin America ==
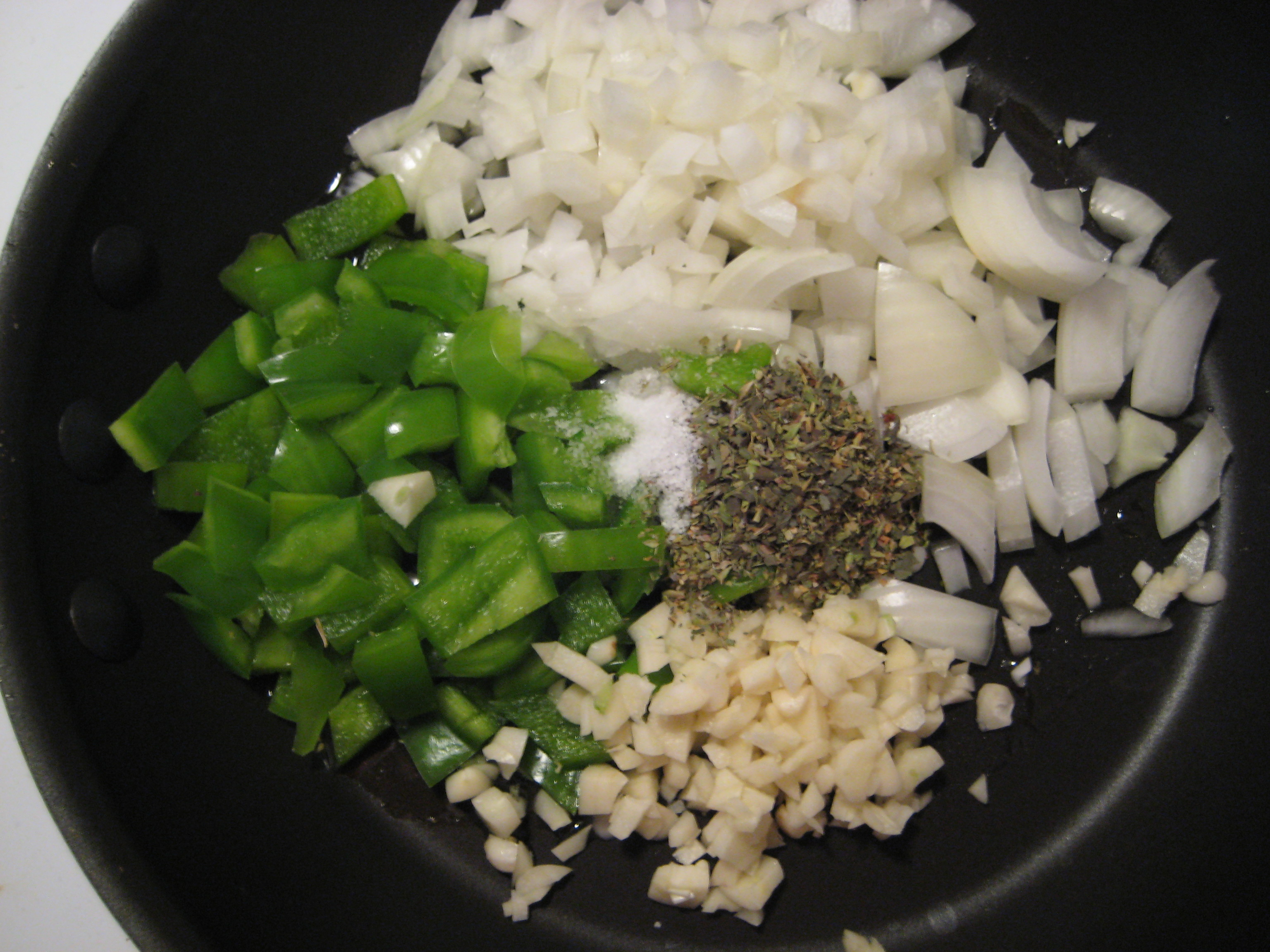
Sofrito being prepared from bell pepper, onion, garlic, and herbs

In Venezuelan cuisine, sofrito or aliño has four main ingredients: garlic, onions, bell pepper, and sweet chili (ají dulce) generally fried in corn oil. Sometimes other secondary components are added such as tomato, spring onions, parsley or coriander, depending on the dish.

=== The Caribbean ===
In Cuban cuisine, the main components of sofrito are Spanish onions, garlic, and green or red bell peppers. Ají cachucha is also often used instead of or in addition to bell peppers. It is a base for beans, stews, rices, and other dishes, including ropa vieja and picadillo. Optional ingredients include tomato sauce, dry white wine, cumin, bay leaf, and cilantro. Chorizo (a kind of spicy, cured sausage), tocino (salt pork) and ham are added for specific recipes, such as beans.

In Dominican cuisine, sofrito is commonly known as sazón. Unlike many other Caribbean and Latin American sofritos, Dominican sazón does not follow a single standard recipe, since ingredients vary widely between cooks and families. What most defines Dominican sazón is the use of false orégano, garlic, red onions and, cubanelle peppers. False orégano is one of the most important herbs in Dominican gastronomy and appears in countless savory dishes, including meats, stews, beans, and even hot sauces. Depending on the household or region, sazón may also include annatto, tomatoes, bell peppers, celery, vinegar, citrus juice, culantro, ají dulce, cilantro, and other aromatics.

In Puerto Rican cuisine, sofrito is defined by its heavy use of recao (culantro) and ají dulce (sweet chili peppers), which give Puerto Rican sofrito its characteristic flavor and aroma. Yellow onions, garlic, cilantro—sometimes including the roots—cubanelle peppers, red bell peppers, and pimientos are blended into a smooth paste. The sofrito is then stored for later use and, when cooking, is typically sautéed in oil or lard, often alongside cured pork, olives, capers, tomatoes, and other seasonings. Orégano brujo, sometimes called "sofrito oregano," was also traditionally used in some Puerto Rican sofrito recipes.

== Asia ==
In Filipino cuisine, ginisá is a culinary term that refers to a base of garlic, onions, and tomatoes sautéed together with cooking oil. It is essentially similar to the Spanish sofrito.

== See also ==
- Epis
- Holy trinity
- Mirepoix
- Salsa
- Sauce
- Sofrito (stew)
