= Arroz con maiz =

Latin American rice and corn dish

Arroz con maíz is a Latin American dish with rice and corn cooked in one pot.

== National versions ==
=== Cuba ===
In Cuba the rice is colored yellow with powdered bijol, annatto seeds. The rice and corn are cooked in Cuban-style sofrito, chorizo, white wine, Cuban orégano, cumin, and chicken stock.

=== Dominican Republic ===
Arroz con maíz, also known as moro de maíz, is a simple dish in the Dominican Republic made with rice and corn. Some cooks add seasonings but it is not typically seasoned.

=== Venezuela ===
Arroz con maíz is usually mixed with bacon. The three main ingredients are usually cooked separately and added together at end.

=== Puerto Rico ===
In Puerto Rico the dish is cooked in one pot with rice, tomato sauce, black pepper, broth, sofrito, corn, and sazón (cumin, turmeric, annatto, coriander seeds, and paprika). Other common ingredients include Vienna sausage, chorizo, annatto oil, bay leaves, banana leaves, orégano brujo, mashed squash, olives, capers, piquillo peppers, and wine. Arroz con maíz has become a common Thanksgiving dish, frequently served with pavochón (roasted turkey).
