= List of Ecuadorian dishes and foods =

Dishes and food from Ecuador

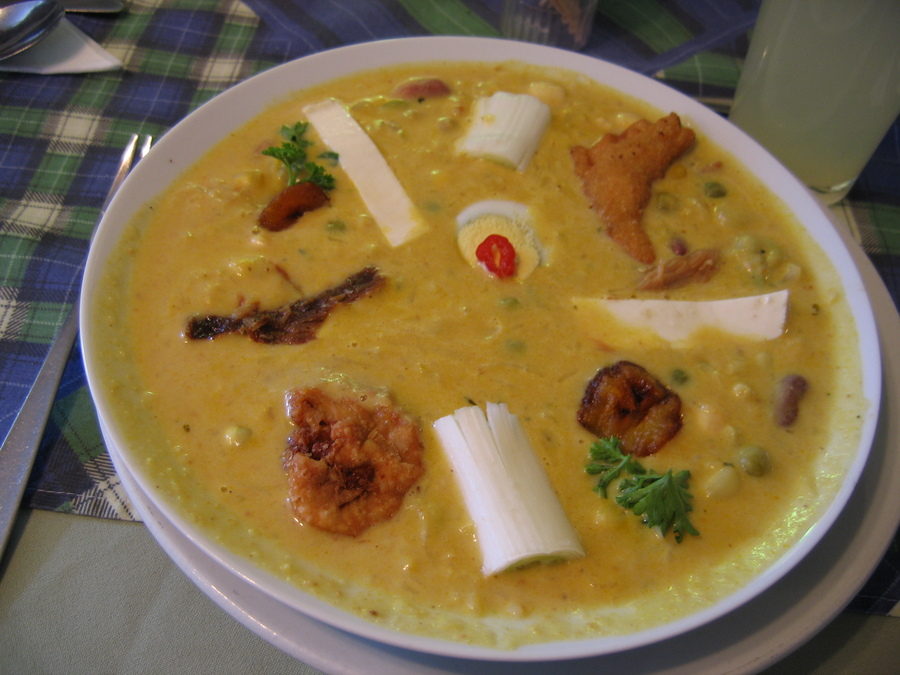
Fanesca is a soup traditionally prepared and eaten by households and communities in Ecuador during Holy Week.

This is a list of Ecuadorian dishes and foods. The cuisine of Ecuador is diverse, varying with altitude, agricultural conditions, and the ethnic and racial makeup of local communities. On the coast, a variety of seafood, grilled steak and chicken are served along with fried plantain, rice and beans. Stewed beef and goat are traditional too. The most traditional seafood dishes are ceviche (shrimp, mussels, oysters, fish, and others) and fish soup. Also, there are a variety of soups based on local vegetables, like sopa de queso (vegetables and white cheese) and caldo de bolas, a soup based on plantains.

In the mountains the most culturally consensuated dishes are encebollado, hornado and fritada, while in the coast they are ceviche, encebollado and viche. Pork, chicken, beef, and cuy (guinea pig) are served with a variety of carbohydrate-rich foods, especially rice, corn, and potatoes. A popular street food in mountainous regions is hornado (roasted pig), which is often served with llapingacho (a pan-seared potato ball). Some examples of Ecuadorian cuisine in general include patacones (unripe plantains fried in oil, mashed up, and then refried), llapingachos, and seco de chivo (a type of stew made from goat). A wide variety of fresh fruit is available, particularly at lower altitudes, including granadilla, passionfruit, naranjilla, several types of bananas, uvilla, taxo, and tree tomato, along with a drink made from fruits known as the colada or even the colada morada.

== Ecuadorian dishes and foods ==
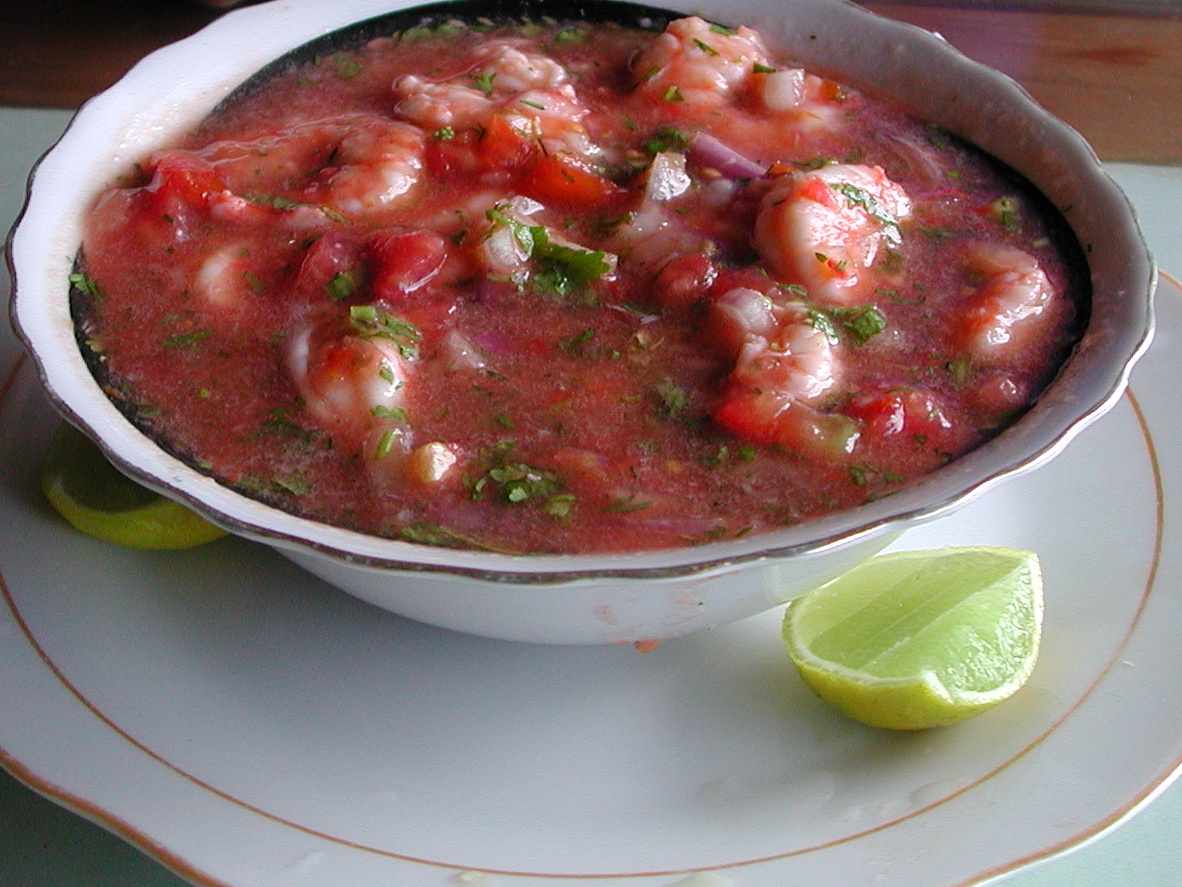
Ecuadorian ceviche, made of shrimp, lemon, onions, and some herbs. Tomato sauce and orange are used at some places but do not form a part of the basic recipe.

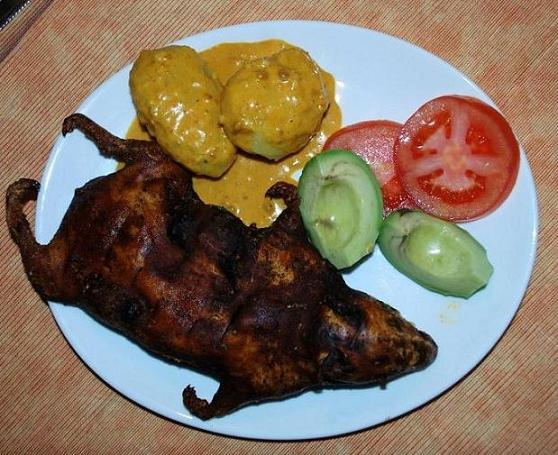
A Guinea pig dish from Ecuador

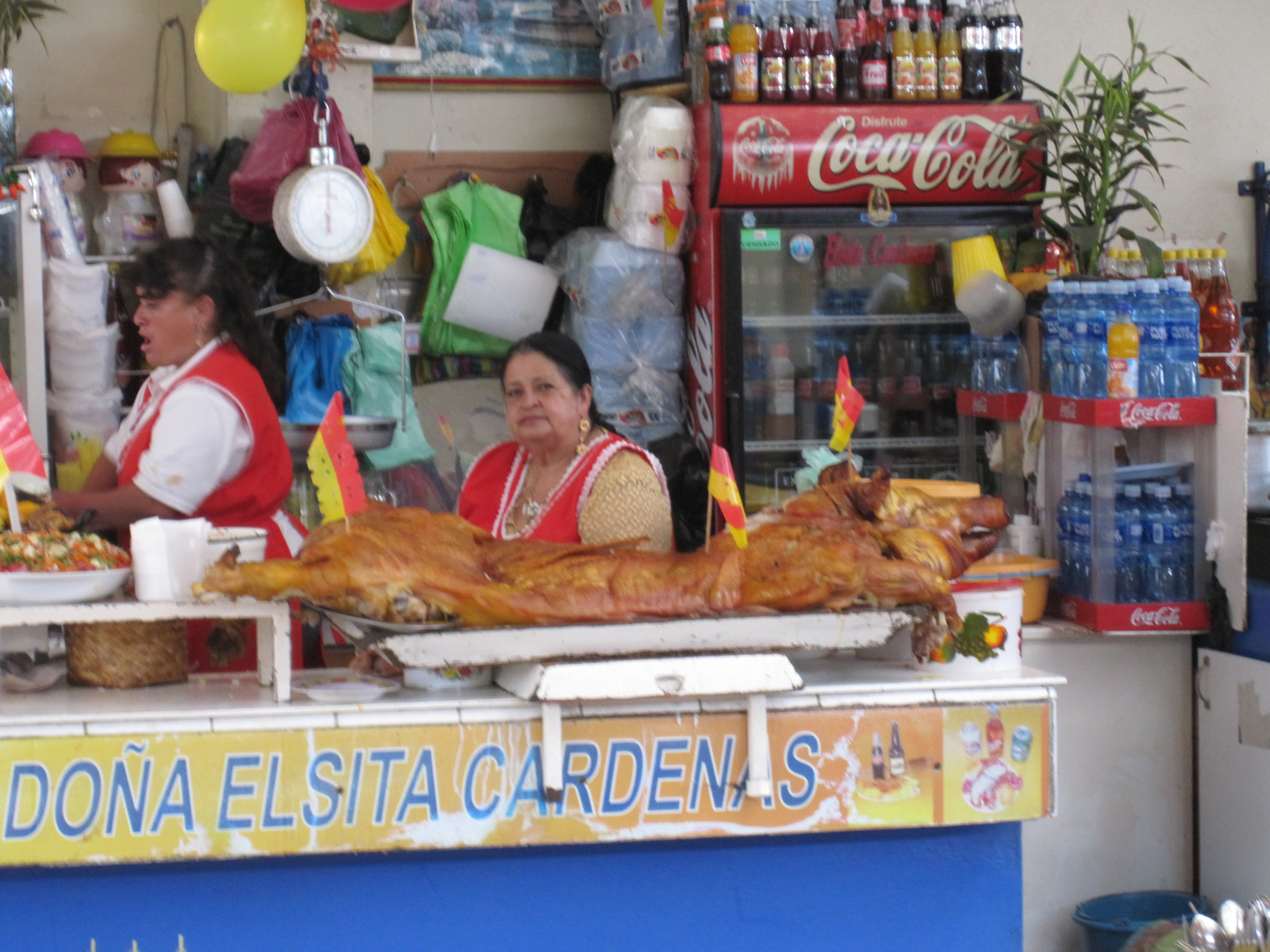
Hornado (fried pig, cooked whole) in a Cuenca market

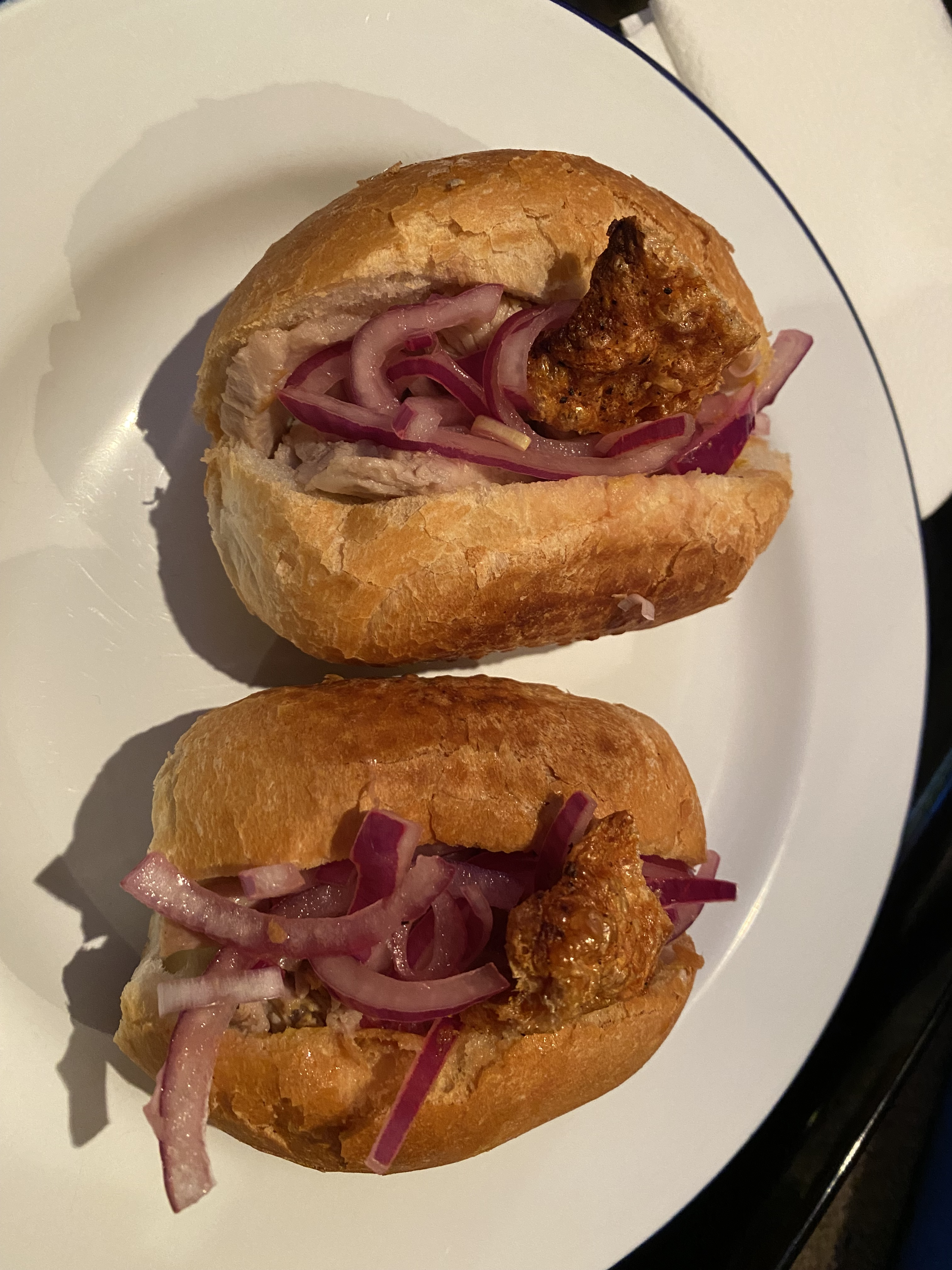
Sanduche de Chancho (Ecuadorian pork sandwiches)

- Alfajor
- Arroz con menestra (rice with a kidney bean stew—usually served with carne frita (thinly-sliced fried beef) and fried maduros (ripe plantains)
- Arroz con pollo
- Bolón de verde
- Ceviche
- Chifle
- Chugchucaras – a local delicacy of Latacunga, Ecuador, and the surrounding area prepared with deep fried pork and several other ingredients
- Churrasco
- Churro
- Chuzos - commonly, "Carne en palito" (beef skewers)
- Come y Bebe (a tropical fruit salad served in orange juice)
- Corviche
- Dulce de Leche
- Ecuador maize varieties – Maize is cropped almost everywhere in Ecuador, with the exception of the Altiplano, the cold desert highlands 3000 meters above sea level.
- Empanadas de Platano
- Empanadas de Viento
- Encebollado – a fish stew from Ecuador, regarded as a national dish.
- Ensalada de veteraba (beet salad)
- Escabeche
- Espumilla
- Fanesca
- Fritada
- Guatitas
- Guinea pig
- Hornado
- Humita
- Ilex guayusa
- Lechon (Suckling pig)
- Llapingacho
- Locro
- Morocho – a hominy-based breakfast porridge
- Mote
- Muchines de yuca
- Panela – unrefined whole cane sugar
- Patacones
- Pescado frito (fried fish—typically served with rice, curtido de cebolla y tomate, and patacones)
- Plantain soup – Caldo de bolas de verde (green plantain dumpling soup) is from coastal Ecuador
- Refrito – referred to as refrito in Ecuador, and it is made of Spanish onions, cubanelle peppers, fresh tomatoes, roasted garlic, cilantro and ground toasted cumin
- Roscas
- Salchipapas
- Sancocho
- Sanduche de pernil (roasted pork sandwich)
- Sango de Camarones
- Sango de Platano Verde
- Seco
- T'anta wawa
- Tamale
- Tortilla de verde
- Uchu Jacu
- Yawarlukru
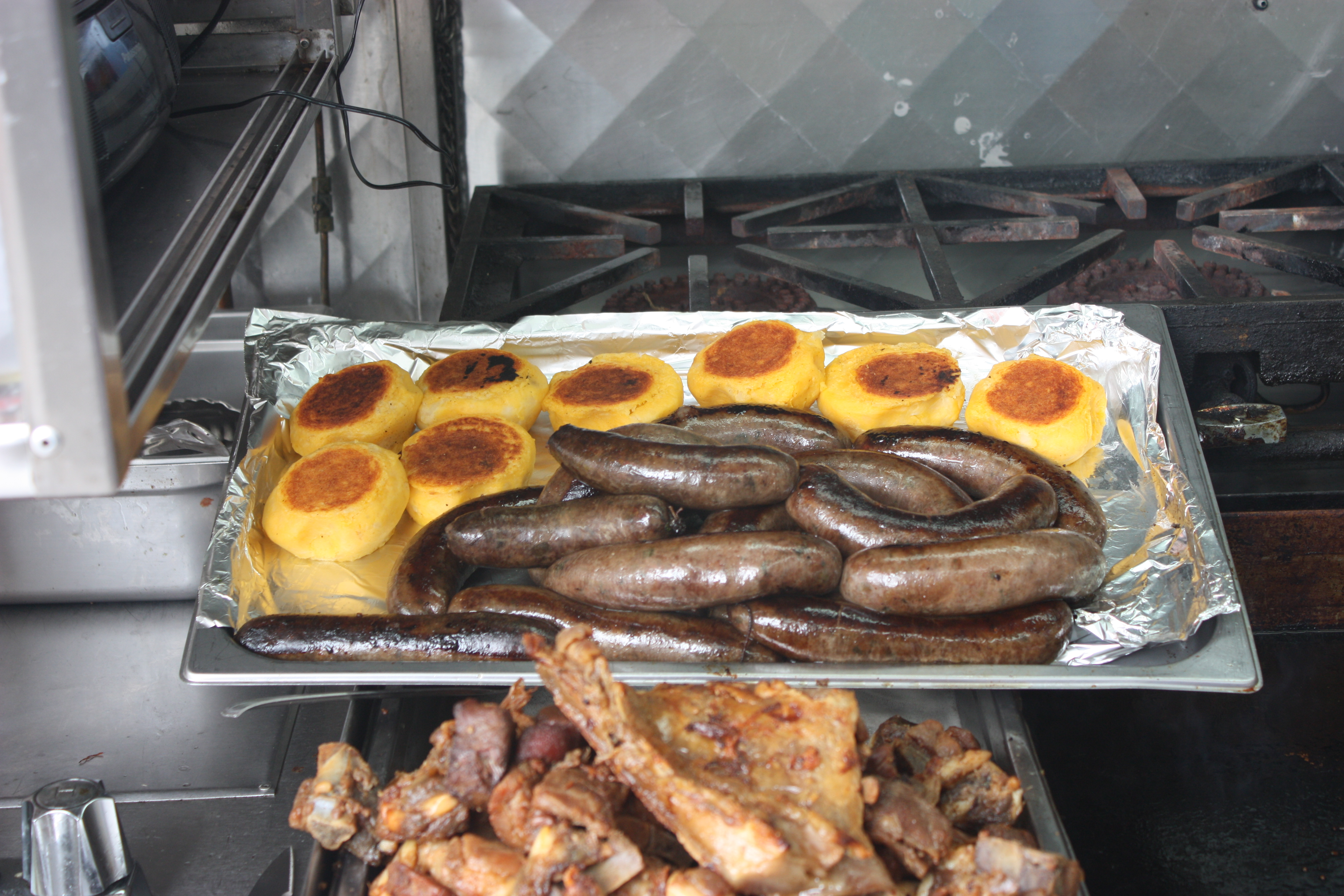
Llapingacho (pictured top) with chorizo

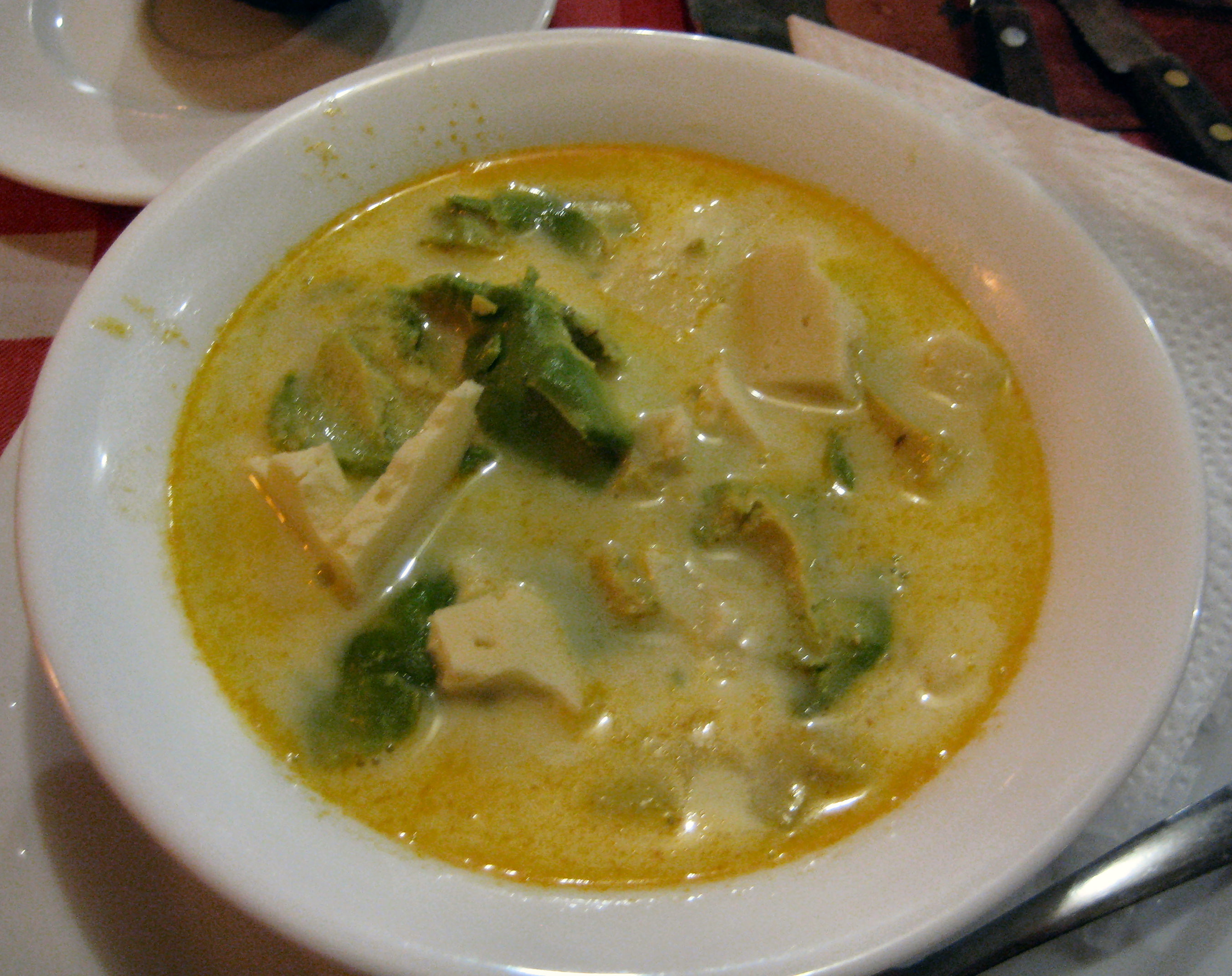
Locro

=== Condiments ===
- Ají criollo
- Curtido de cebolla y tomate – a pickled onion and tomato salsa
- Salprieta

=== Beverages ===
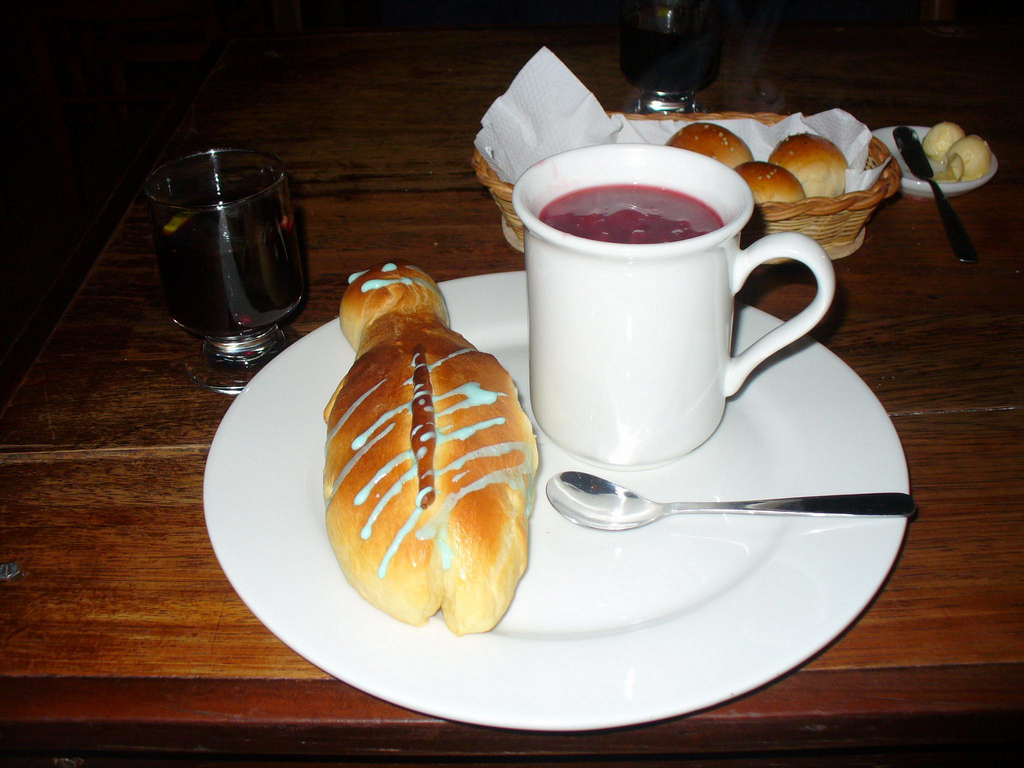
Colada morada served with a t'anta wawa

- Canelazo – a hot alcoholic beverage consumed in the Andean highlands of Ecuador, Colombia, and Peru
- Champús
- Chapil
- Chicha
- Colada morada
- Cuáker – a breakfast beverage made with Quaker Oats. Cuáker is a loanword of Quaker.
- Fioravanti – a fruit-flavored, carbonated soft drink first sold in 1878 in Ecuador
- Horchata

== See also ==
- Amazonian cuisine
- Latin American cuisine
- Outline of Ecuador
