= Jacu =

Jacu may refer to:

- Jacu River, in the Rio Grande do Norte and Paraíba states in eastern Brazil
- Jacu, the Portuguese name, from a Tupi language, to the guan (birds of the genus Penelope)
- Uchu Jacu, a traditional flour from the Ecuadorian province of Pichincha
- A village in Albești, Mureș, a commune in Mureș County, Romania

== See also ==
- Jaco (disambiguation)
- Jacuí (disambiguation)
