= Guagua (disambiguation) =

Guagua is a municipality in Pampanga, Philippines.

Guagua may also refer to:

- Guagua (instrument), or catá, a Cuban percussion instrument
- Guagua de pan, a hispanicised word for the food T'anta wawa
- Guagua language, or Piaroa, an indigenous language of Colombia and Venezuela

== People with the surname ==
- Jorge Guagua (born 1981), an Ecuadorian footballer
