= Hornado =

Whole roast pig from Ecuadorian cuisine

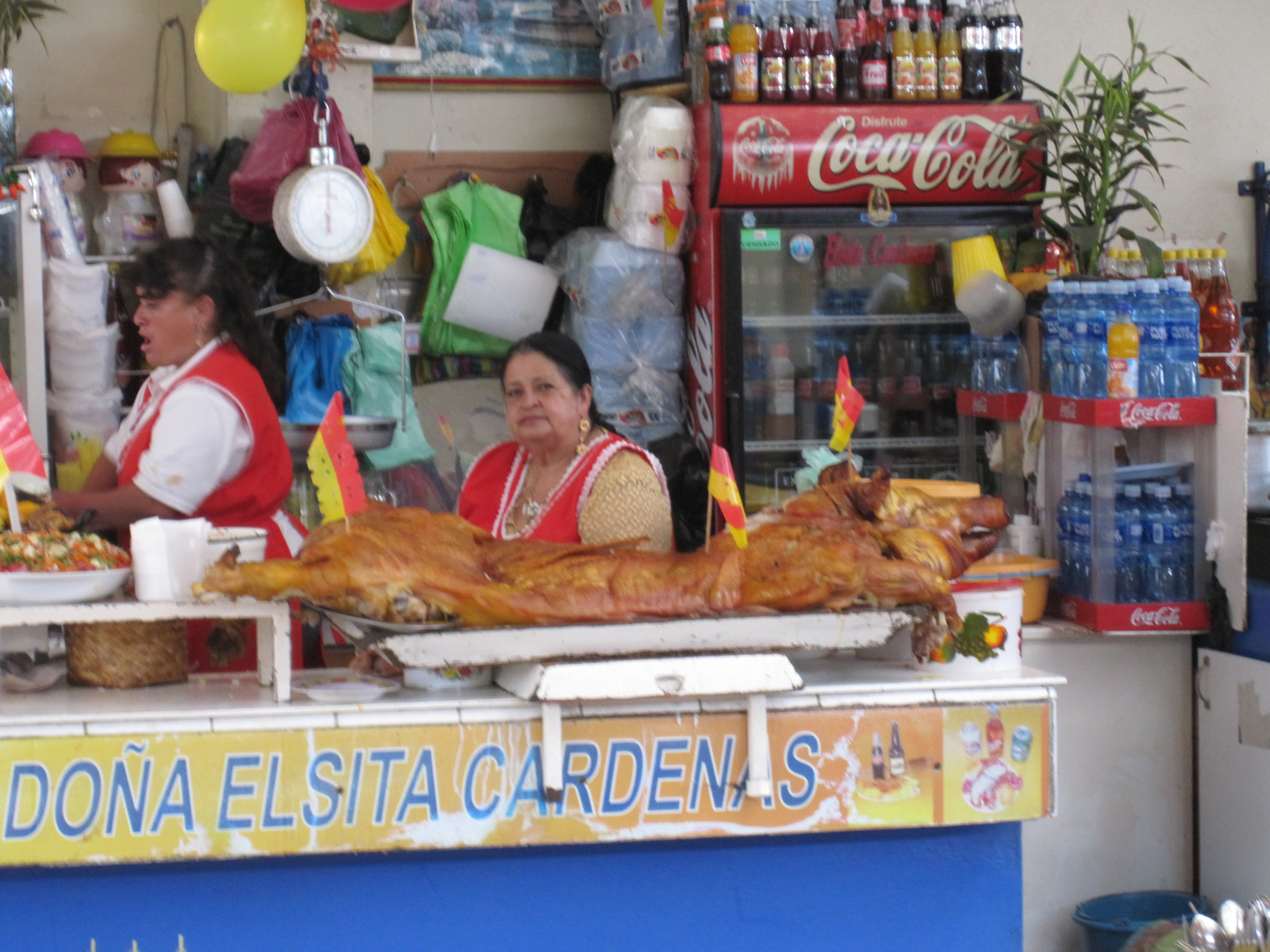
Hornado in a Cuenca market

Hornado is roast pig, cooked whole, in Ecuadorian cuisine. It is often served in highland markets. Hornado is generally accompanied by llapingacho, mote (hominy), and vegetables.

== See also ==
- List of Ecuadorian dishes and foods
