= Fritada =

Traditional Ecuadorian dish

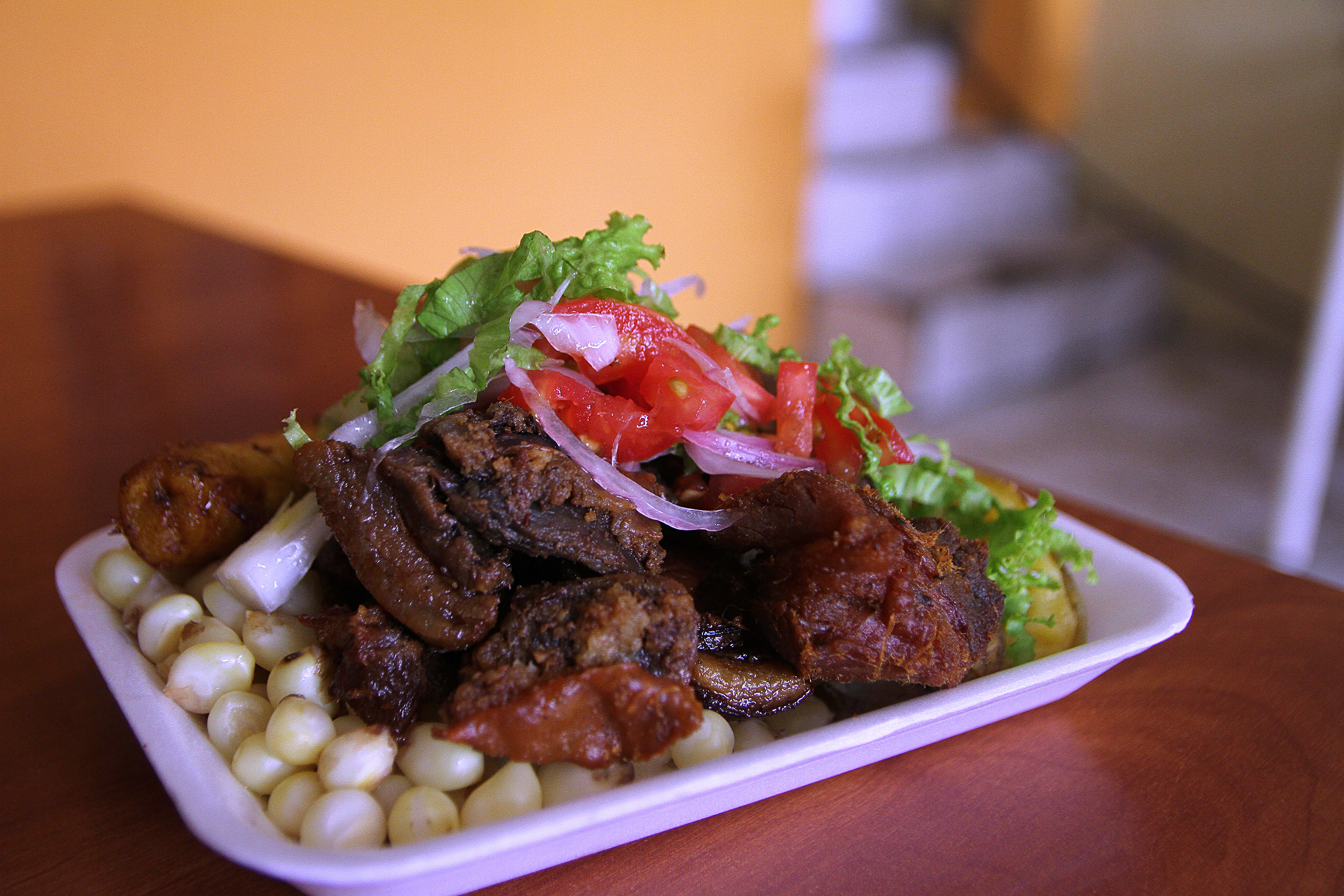
Fritada from Cuenca

Fritada is a typical dish in Ecuadorian cuisine. Its main ingredient is braised pork. It is a traditional dish from the highlands, and its origins date back to the colonial era, to the beginning of the 19th century. The pork is cooked in a mix of boiling water, orange juice with onion, garlic and cumin until the liquid is gone and the pork browns in the “mapahuira” or mix of its own grease and spices/flavors from the onion/garlic in a brass pan over flames. It is generally served with Llapingacho which are potato tortillas or whole boiled potatoes, mote or cooked corn, pickled onions and tomato, and fried ripe plantains. It may also be accompanied by cooked fava beans or mellocos, though mellocos are rather uncommon.

== See also ==
- List of Ecuadorian dishes and foods
