= Colada morada =

Purple hot corn beverage from Ecuador

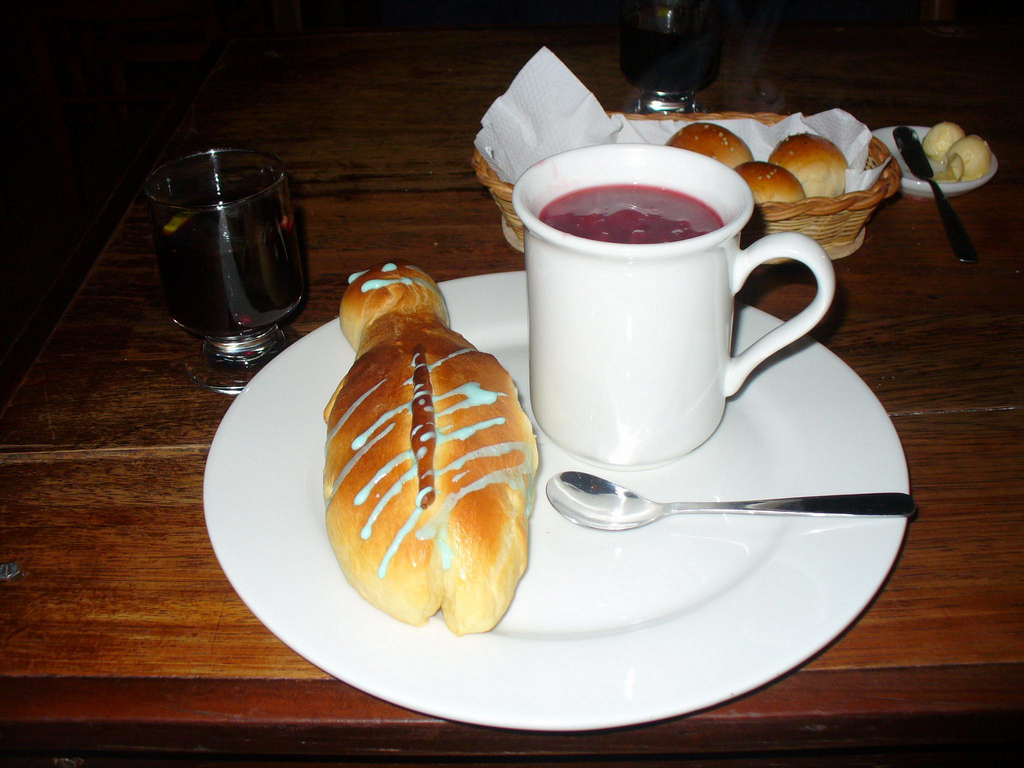
Colada morada served with a t'anta wawa

Colada morada is a drink that is part of Ecuador's gastronomic culture along with t'anta wawa bread dolls. It is a purple and thick liquid that is prepared with typical fruits of Ecuador, spices and corn flour.

This drink is traditionally consumed on November 2, a holiday called All Souls' Day or Day of the Dead, along with the so-called t'anta wawa (bread usually of non-ordinary flavor and various fillings that has the shape of a doll, hence the name) which are representations of the dead wrapped in a blanket.

The origin of this drink dates back to pre-Columbian times, where the ancestral peoples related to harvest and planting as synonyms of life and death. Indigenous people from the Ecuadorian mountain range celebrated the rainy season and in turn worshipped their relatives who had died. Being the Colada Morada as a symbol of a happy journey from life to death. For the same reason, they exhumed their dead and shared with them this traditional drink. As a great example in which they celebrated with the colada morada based on the blood of the llamas is the Quitu-Cara culture.

After being colonized by the Spaniards, the tradition was adopted by them and they transformed it into a religious offering, also with their arrival, they brought products like wheat, with this product as a base, they created the t'anta wawa that we now know, and they supplanted the zapallo tortillas cooked in the pot, which was what the Indians commonly ate in this celebration.

Although the tradition is to eat it on the day of the dead, its consumption is usually marketed in the month of October and November.

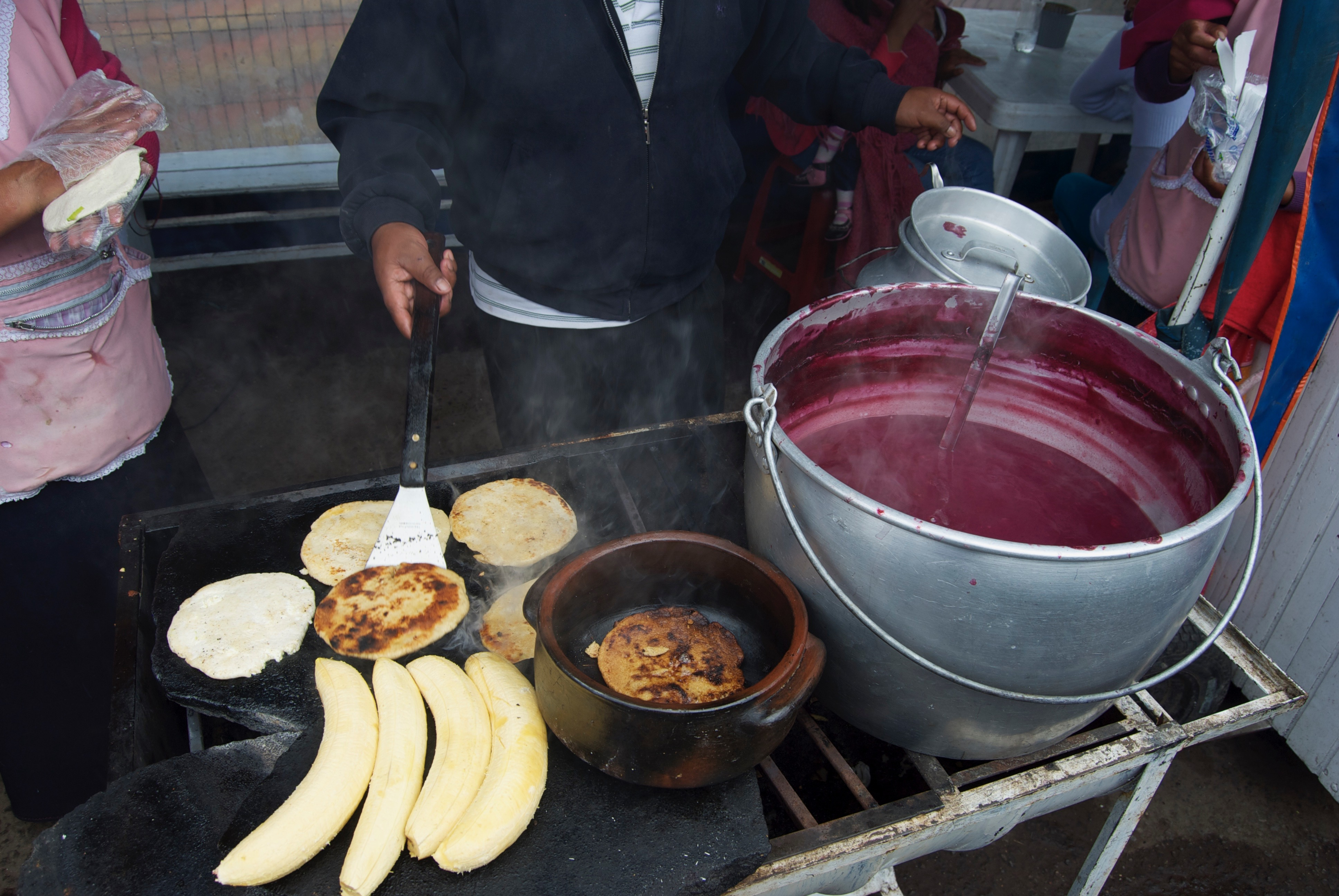
Preparation of colada morada in steel pot

== Ingredients ==
Colada morada is mainly prepared with purple corn flour, which gives it its thick consistency. Some people, instead of corn flour, use corn starch, fruits such as naranjilla, pineapple, strawberry, babaco, guava, blackberry or mortiño (wild blueberry from the Andean paramo). It also carries a number of aromatic herbs and barks, such as cinnamon, cloves, ishpingo, allspice, orange leaf, lemongrass, lemon verbena, etc. To sweeten, sugar or panela is used.

== See also ==
- Api (beverage)
- Mazamorra
- List of Ecuadorian dishes and foods
- List of maize dishes
