= Salprieta =

Ecuadorian side dish

Salprieta or sal prieta is a typical side dish from the province of Manabí, Ecuador, used as condiment for dishes based on fish, plantain or rice.

The basic recipe for salprieta contains equal parts of toasted corn and toasted peanuts, both ground to a coarse powder; then mixed with finely chopped coriander, dried oregano, salt and black pepper. Achiote oil can be added to give color to the mixture.

The term is derived from Spanish Sal (salt) and prieta meaning dense, dark.

== See also ==
- List of Ecuadorian dishes and foods
