= Seco (food) =

Stew typical of Ecuadorian cuisine

- Alternative names: chicken stew, meat stew, goat stew, kid stew, chavelo stew, glove stew
- Type: Stew
- Place of origin: Northern Peru
- Main ingredients: Meat (chicken, beef or goat) and various seasonings.

The seco is a stew typical of Peruvian and Ecuadorian cuisine. It can be made with any type of meat. According to the Dictionary of Peruvianisms of the Peruvian Wings University, seco is a "stew of beef, kid or another animal, macerated in vinegar, which is served accompanied by rice and a sauce of ají, huacatay and cilantro". Thus, its main characteristic is to marinate and cook the chosen meat with some type of sauce acid, such as chicha, beer, naranjilla or vinegar.

== Origins ==
The place where it was created for the first time is not known exactly. According to culinary researcher Gloria Hinostroza, the origin of this stew lies in the seco tajine, North African dish made from lamb. His brother, the journalist and gourmet Rodolfo Hinostroza, agrees that the origin would be in the tajine carried by slaves from North Africa who traveled to the Pacific coast of South America during the early years of the Viceroyalty.

There are references that indicate that it could be a stew known in Peru and Ecuador as early as the 19th century, during his visit to Peru, the anthropologist German Ernst Wilhelm Middendorf stated that:

They are called dry dishes in which chicken or kid meat is sautéed in a thin, spicy broth together with yellow potatoes. There are many stews that are prepared in a similar way [...] Some nuns are very expert in their preparation [...] All these stews have to be sautéed or stewed over a high heat over low heat, to be fully penetrated by the spices, which taste much better than they appear [...] Actually, the external appearance is sometimes inapparent, but this is a fault that could be easily corrected, if tried.

A recipe for seco de cabrito, a typical dish of the gastronomy of the north coast of Peru, already appears in the New Peruvian Cooking Manual of 1926. In the 1930 book Chronicles of Old Guayaquil, Modesto Chávez Franco reports that the dry chicken was already prepared in Ecuador since the beginning of the 19th century.

=== Origin of name ===
There is no consensus on the origin of the name of this dish. It is popularly thought that when cooking the stew the water must evaporate until it reaches a degree of dryness, hence it must be "seco", although in reality all the variants of "seco" are usually quite juicy, and that the name "seco" is an ironic way of calling a soupy dish.

One of the most widely accepted references is that the name seco comes from the Santa Elena Peninsula, where at the beginning of the 20th century oil works were carried out in the Ecuadorian town of Ancón. At that time, Creole deer and goats abounded (in fact, the dried goat is native to the Guayas Province) and a stew was prepared with them very simple that was accompanied by red rice, as in Ecuador it is customary to serve lunch with a soup of starter and a main course called the "second course" to which the English workers would say "second", which, by derivation, led to "seco".

However, this is a myth, since, according to Modesto Chávez Franco in his Chronicles of Guayaquil, there are records of this dish from 1820, almost a century before the English presence in the Santa Elena Peninsula.

== Varieties ==
The different ways of cooking "seco" depend on the main meat that is added to it.

=== In Ecuador ===
In general, the "seco" one in the highlands of Ecuador is accompanied by white rice or rice cooked with achiote, ripe plantains, potatoes and avocado, while on the coast (for example, the manabita stew) it is accompanied by yucas cooked or fried and a salad. According to the main meat that is added we have:

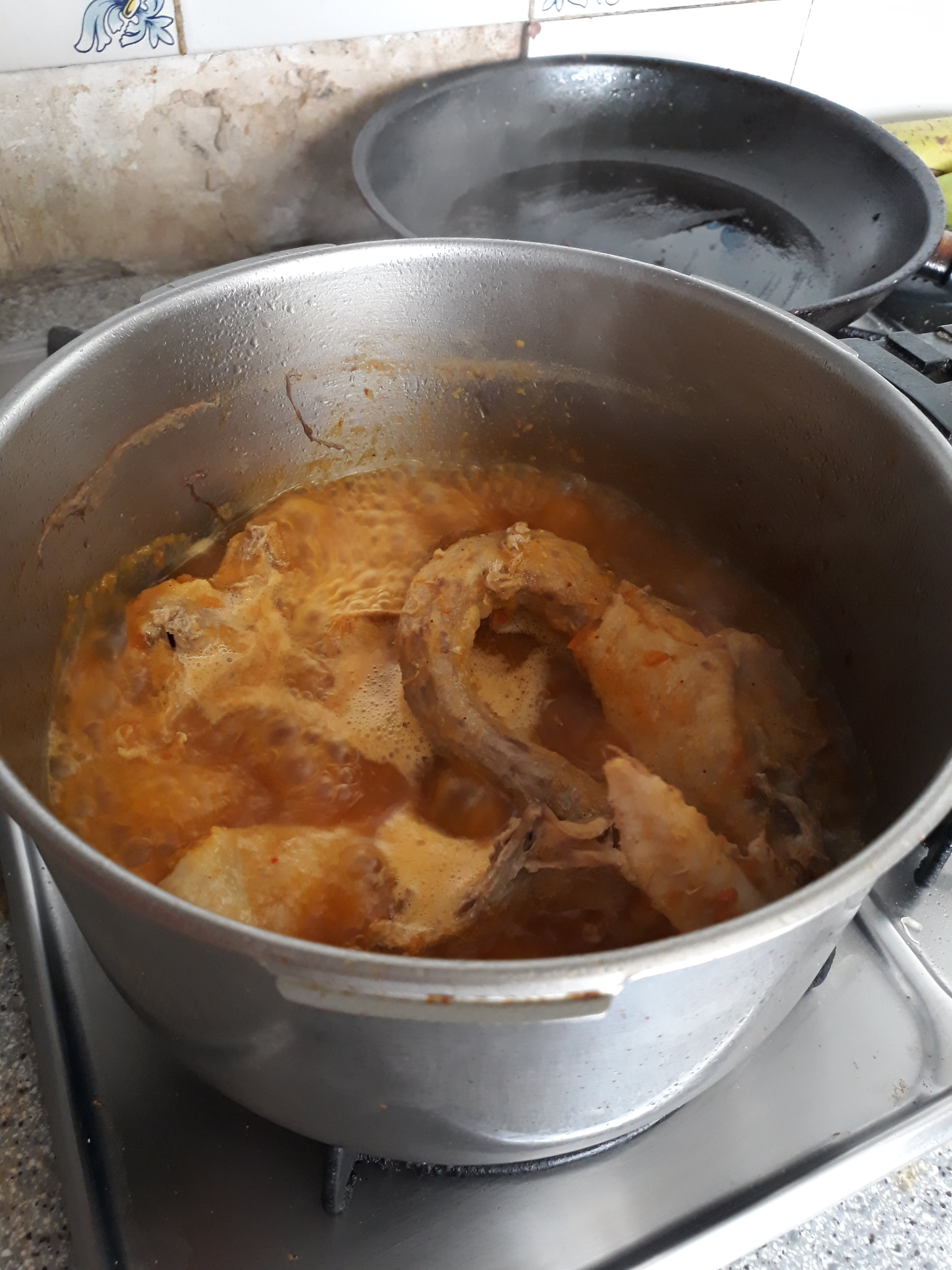
Chicken stew cooking

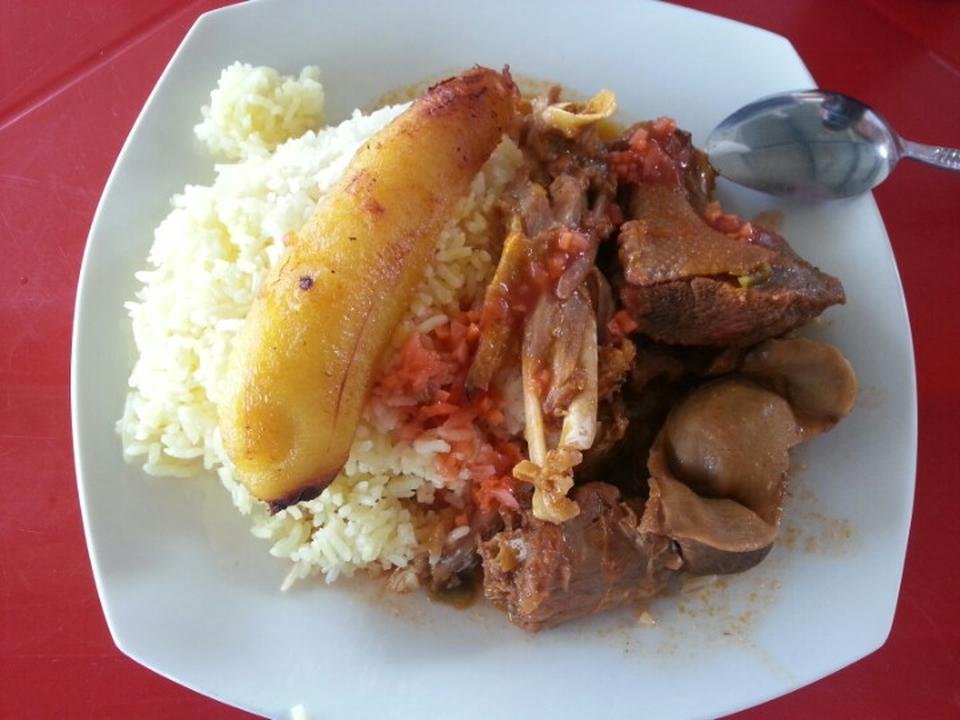
Chivo stew with white rice and plantain

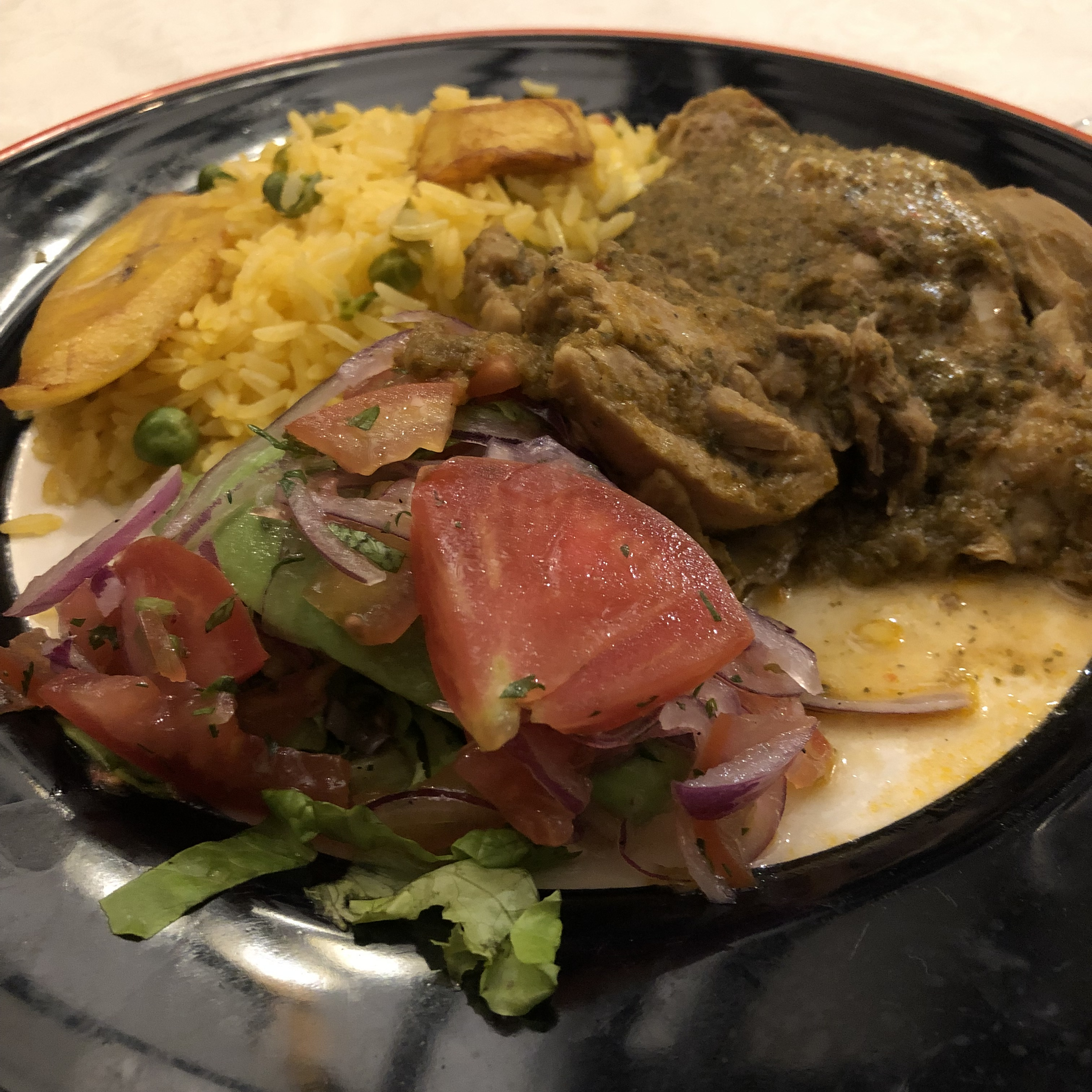
Guanta stew with red rice, salad and patacones
- Chicken stew: As its name indicates, the main ingredient is chicken meat (in the form of quarters), although chicken can also be used, that is roasted in a pot along with tomato, onion, pepper, and spices such as mint or cilantro and the juice of naranjilla. It is considered a unique and festive dish that is served hot. The dried chicken is made in two stages, the first is the preparation of the meat, which is fried in a pot until it reaches goldenla. The chicken can be stir-fried with or without a marinade that is made in lemon juice. In the second phase (which we could say "wet") the golden chicken is cooked in a liquid formed by blending the other ingredients. The sour taste is achieved by adding beer or separately liquefied naranjilla juice, which should be added in the final stages of cooking. Among the Ecuadorian population abroad, naranjilla can be difficult to obtain, which has given rise to variants through substitute sour fruits, such as tamarind or the kiwi.
- Goat stew: It is a dish consumed in the provinces of Loja, Santa Elena and Guayas Province. It is a stew that derives from the northern Peruvian dry kid. The meat is marinated with chicha de jora, although beer is preferably used to soften the strong flavor of the meat . In some cases, goat meat is replaced by lamb meat, although the dish is still called in the same way.
- Guanta stew: It is a typical dish of the Ecuadorian Amazon. Place the meat of the glove in pieces in a deep bowl mixed with the crushed garlic and cerveza. Separately, it is fried in the oil, with all the chopped ingredients (onion, pepper, coriander, peanuts, etc.) and the seasonings. Blend the kidney tomatoes together with the paiteña onion. Then, the meat is incorporated with the beer liquid, it is allowed to mix everything well and it is cooked over low heat until it is soft. This dish is usually served with rice and patacones fried plantain and yuca.
- Other stews: Other stews that are usually prepared in Ecuador are duck stew, goat or lamb stew, chicken stew, meat stew, lamb stew and fish stew.

=== In Peru ===
The Peruvian seco is a typical dish of the north coast and of the capital of the country. It is usually chicken, meat, kid, lamb, beef, chicken or fish, its main ingredient, and the one that gives it its characteristic flavor, is cilantro.

It is usually accompanied by beans cooked and white rice.

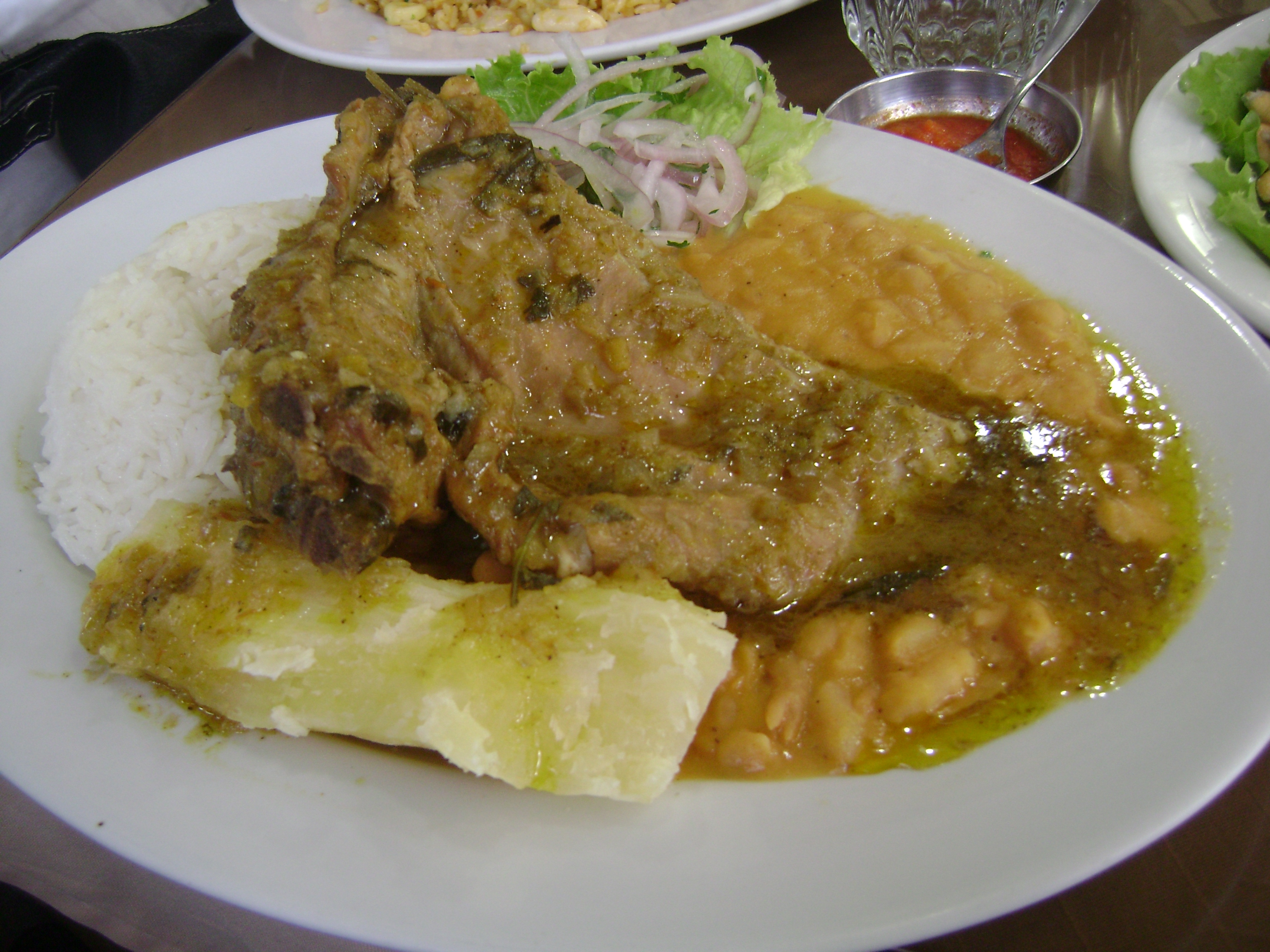
Kid stew accompanied by cooked yuccas, white rice, beans and Creole sauce

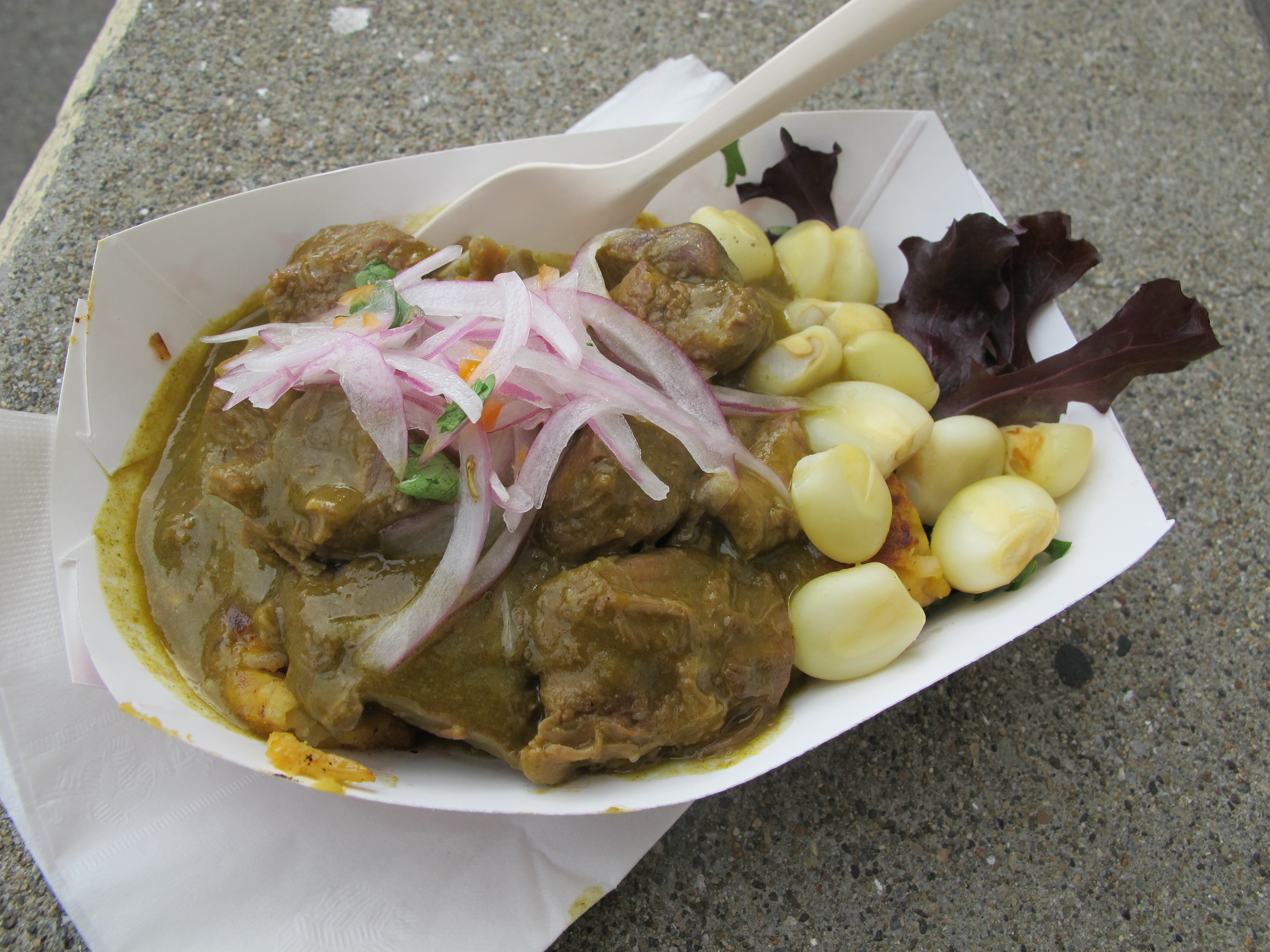
Lamb stew with mote

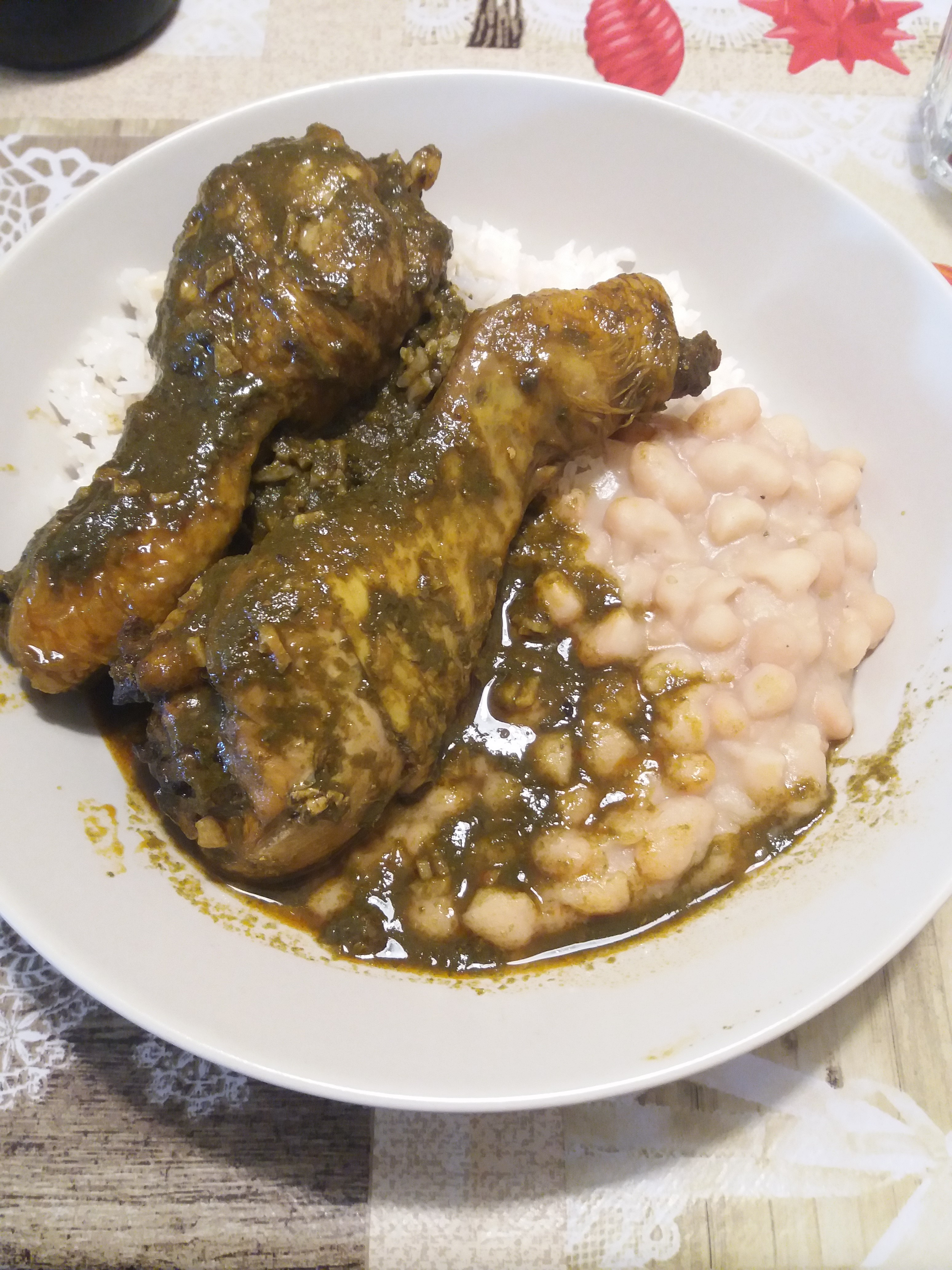
Chicken stew with rice and beans

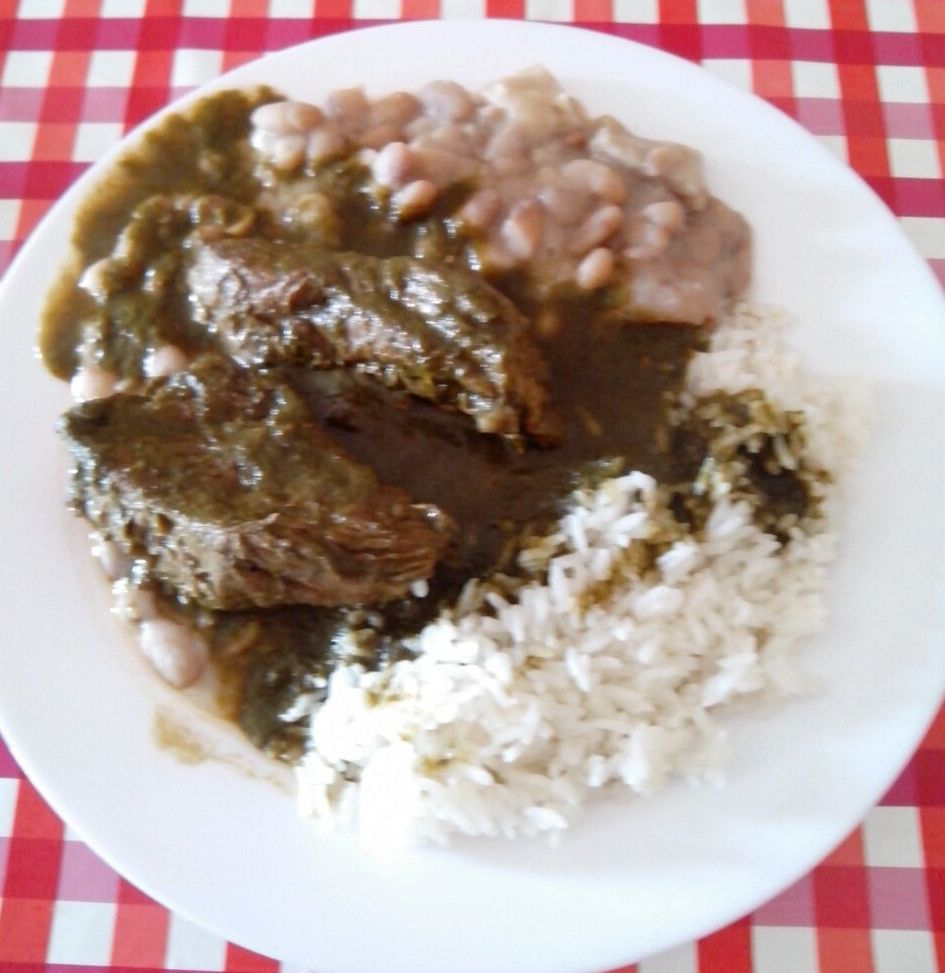
Meat stew with white rice and beans
- Kid stew: Also called northern goat, is typical of the gastronomy of the Peruvian north coast, from the department of La Libertad to the border with Ecuador. It is made with milk goat marinated in chicha de jora and stewed with coriander, yellow pepper and loche squash. It is served with cooked yucas, criolla sauce, white rice and beans. In Piura, it is customary to serve it with a tamale. A variant that is consumed replacing the kid is the lamb stew.
- Chabelo stew or chabelo stew with cecina: It is a typical dish of the region of Piura, that is sometimes served as a picking. It is made up of green plantains cooked in water or grilled, which is then pounded in a mortar and combined with roasted or dried beef (cecina), seasoned with chili, tomato, onion and, like all dried meats, with an acid ingredient, in this case chicha de jora.
- Other stews: In Peru they usually cook dried stews of different meats, among the most outstanding we have the chicken stew, the meat stew or tenderloin stew, the duck stew, the pork stew, the fish stew and the shrimp stew.

== See also ==
- Stew
- Marinade

== Bibliography ==
- Saltos, Julio (2016). Gastronomic analysis of the dried goat in the province of Guayas (PDF) (in Spanish).
- Acurio, Gastón (2017). ¡Buenazo! (in Spanish). Penguin Random House Grupo Editorial Perú. ISBN 9786124272196.
- Hinostroza, Rodolfo (2006). Primicias de cocina Peruana (in Spanish). León (Spain): Everest. ISBN 84-241-1480-9.
