= Fanesca =

Ecuadorian soup

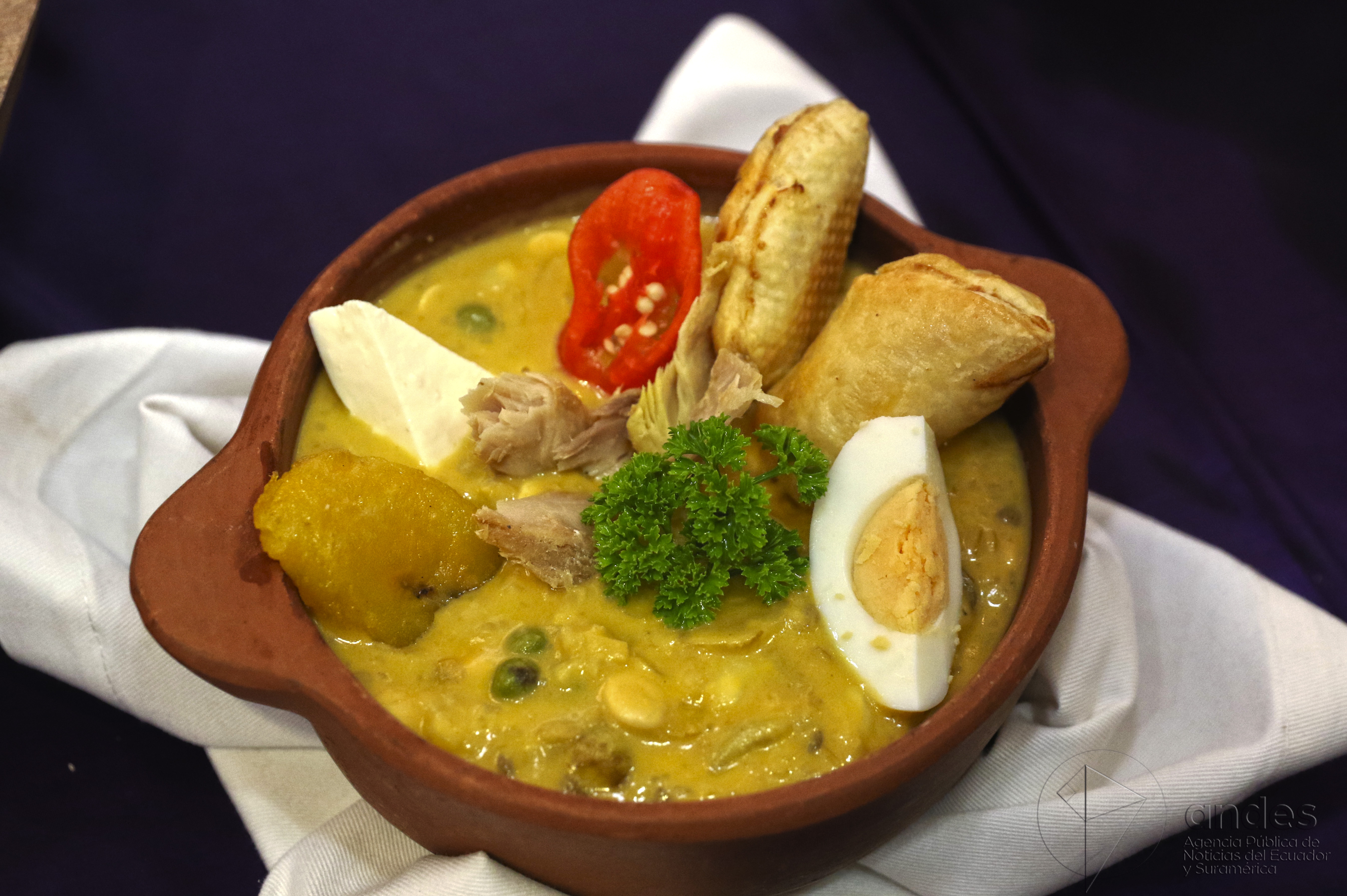
- Type: Soup
- Place of origin: Ecuador
- Main ingredients: Figleaf gourd, pumpkin, beans and grains, salt cod, milk

Fanesca is a soup traditionally prepared only on Good Friday and is eaten by households and communities in Ecuador. This dish is an Ecuadorian tradition that is prepared to give thanks to God for the food provided and blessings.

== History ==
The indigenous people who occupied the territory of Ecuador celebrated the Muchuc Nina (New Fire Day) in the season that corresponds to March, where they grilled tender grains with Andean pumpkins taking advantage of the beginning of the young harvest. The Mushuc Nina was celebrated to commemorate the equinox solstice, when the sun takes a perpendicular position on the equinoctial line, erasing all shadows. The indigenous people prepared for this festival by fasting and abstaining from sexual activity. The indigenous people's culinary preparation with tender grains and Andean pumpkins on New Fire Day became known as Uchucuta, a Quichua phrase that means tender grains cooked with chili and herbs, probably accompanied by wild guinea pig meat. During the colony's evangelizing period, the Spaniards mixed Catholic symbols and beliefs with indigenous components in order to accomplish cultural miscegenation. In the case of Holy Week, the Spaniards combined the commemoration of Jesus Christ's death, passion, and resurrection with the indigenous Muchuc Nina ritual, creating a preparation based on tender grains, which with the influence of the conquerors includes this stew some grains, dairy products, and salted and dried fish to avoid decomposition. The Spaniards add beans, lentils, and peas into the gastronomic portion, which strengthens trade between the mountains and the shore, allowing products such as bananas, peanuts, and fish to be found in mountain areas, aspects that are part of the Fanesca.

By the 19th century Quito was already celebrating Holy Week with the dish technically known as Fanesca, which would become an essential component of the event. The oldest reference to a Fanesca recipe could be from 1882, described by Juan Pablo Sanz in his book "The Cook's Manual"

Currently, Fanesca is most popular in the northern highlands of Ecuador. Its popularity decreases to the south and the Coastal region. The Manabí province is where Fanesca is less important.

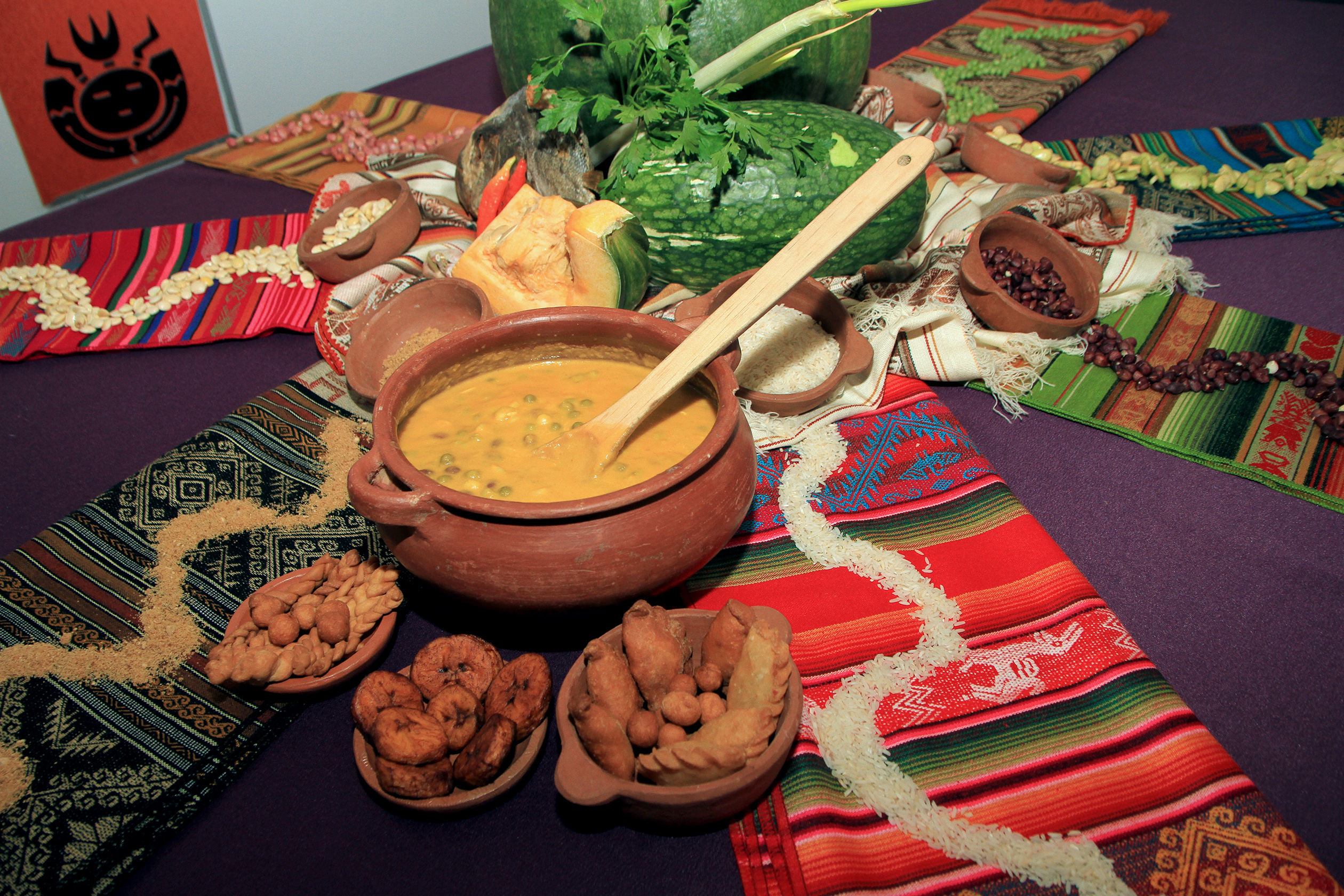

== Ingredients and preparation ==
The components of fanesca and its method of preparation vary regionally, or even from one family to another. It is typically prepared and served only in the week before Easter (Holy Week). Making the soup is labor-intensive.

It is a rich soup with primary ingredients figleaf gourd (sambo), pumpkin (zapallo), and twelve different kinds of beans and grains including chochos (lupines), fava beans (habas), lentils, peas, corn, and others, together with salt cod (bacalao) cooked in milk, due to the Catholic religious prohibition against red meat during Holy Week. It is also generally garnished with hard-boiled eggs, fried plantains, herbs, parsley, and sometimes empanadas de viento (Ecuadorian fried cheese empanadas).

== Cultural themes and consumption ==
The twelve beans represent the twelve apostles of Jesus, and the bacalao is symbolic of Jesus himself.

Fanesca is usually consumed at midday, which is generally the principal meal of the day within Ecuadorian culture. The making and eating of fanesca are considered a social or family activity.

- Choclo: It symbolizes St. Peter because the number of grains of an ear gives faith in the children and grandchildren he had. The hair represents his beard.
- Chochos: They must be purified for seven days. This saint is Judas Iscariot, who only washed can be part of the soup.
- Peas: Green pearls that represent San Antonio, the love of nature and farming. "Feed the body so that the soul has peace."
- Beans: Grains of dominant flavor par excellence and of great identity. She represents Mary Magdalene, for being the companion of the mother (Loiza) of Jesus.
- Zapallo: For his abundant food he represents St. Francis of Assisi, who abandoned his kingdom and fortune to follow God.
- Frijole: The three frijoles represent the Magi, who brought gold, myrrh, and incense to Bethlehem.
- Cod: It represents the multiplication of fish. He is the guest you can't miss. It is Jesus, who sends back the sense of sharing.
- Onion: They represent the braids of the Virgin Mary. For causing tears, they refer to the tears shed.
- Milk and derivatives: St. Augustine, the most balanced saint, purifies relationships and harmonizes flavor and aroma.
- Aromatic herbs: Cilantro and oregano are Fray Martín de Porres, the only black saint, who healed with herbs and roots.
- The fries: They are added at the end and represent political relatives, who can avoid whether you want to or not, as with some visits.

== See also ==
- List of Ecuadorian dishes and foods
- List of foods with religious symbolism
- List of soups
