= Chugchucaras =

Food of Ecuador

Chugchucaras is the local delicacy of Latacunga, Ecuador, and the surrounding area. Chugchucaras consists of deep fried pork, mote (boiled hominy), potatoes, fried plantains, empanadas, and pork rinds. It is accompanied by aji, a spicy sauce made with hot peppers, tomatoes, cilantro, and onions.

Chugchucaras comes from two words in Kichwa (Ecuador's indigenous language): Chukchuna which means "trembling"; and Kara meaning "pig skin".

This dish uses the different agricultural and animal products available in the area, as well as plantains that arrive from the lower tropical regions, since Latacunga is on trade routes between coastal, tropical areas and Quito.

Although it is originally from Latacunga, this local delicacy can also be found in other cities of Ecuador.

== See also ==
- List of Ecuadorian dishes and foods
