= Salsa de maní =

Ecuadorian peanut sauce

Salsa de maní is a common table sauce in South American cuisine, associated with the cuisine of Ecuador. One way the peanut sauce is used in the local cuisine is to dress potatoes and llapingachos. It is also served with spondylus, a type of spiny oyster.
