= Fioravanti (soft drink) =

Soft drink first sold in 1878

- Type: Cola
- Manufacturer: Ecuador Bottling Company Corp
- Origin: Ecuador
- Introduced: 1878
- Related products: Coca-Cola

Fioravanti is a fruit-flavored, carbonated soft drink first sold in 1878 in Ecuador. It is notable for being one of the first soft drinks commercially sold. In 1991, it was acquired by The Coca-Cola Company.

== Flavors ==
Fioravanti was first available in strawberry flavor, and later in apple flavor. In the summer of 2001, a grape flavor was added, which lasted around 1 year before being discontinued. There was a Fiora Manzana Verde (green apple), with a strong green color, but this did not succeed in the Ecuadorian market.

In Ecuador, the drinking of Fioravanti, often shortened to Fiora, has become a part of popular culture. It is commonly known as Fiora fresa (strawberry) or Fiora Manzana (apple).

Due to the high number of Ecuadorian immigrants in Spain, Coca-Cola had decided to bring strawberry-flavored Fioravanti to Spain, for a three-month test starting in mid-October 2006.

== See also ==
- List of Ecuadorian dishes and foods
