= Encebollado =

Ecuadorian fish stew

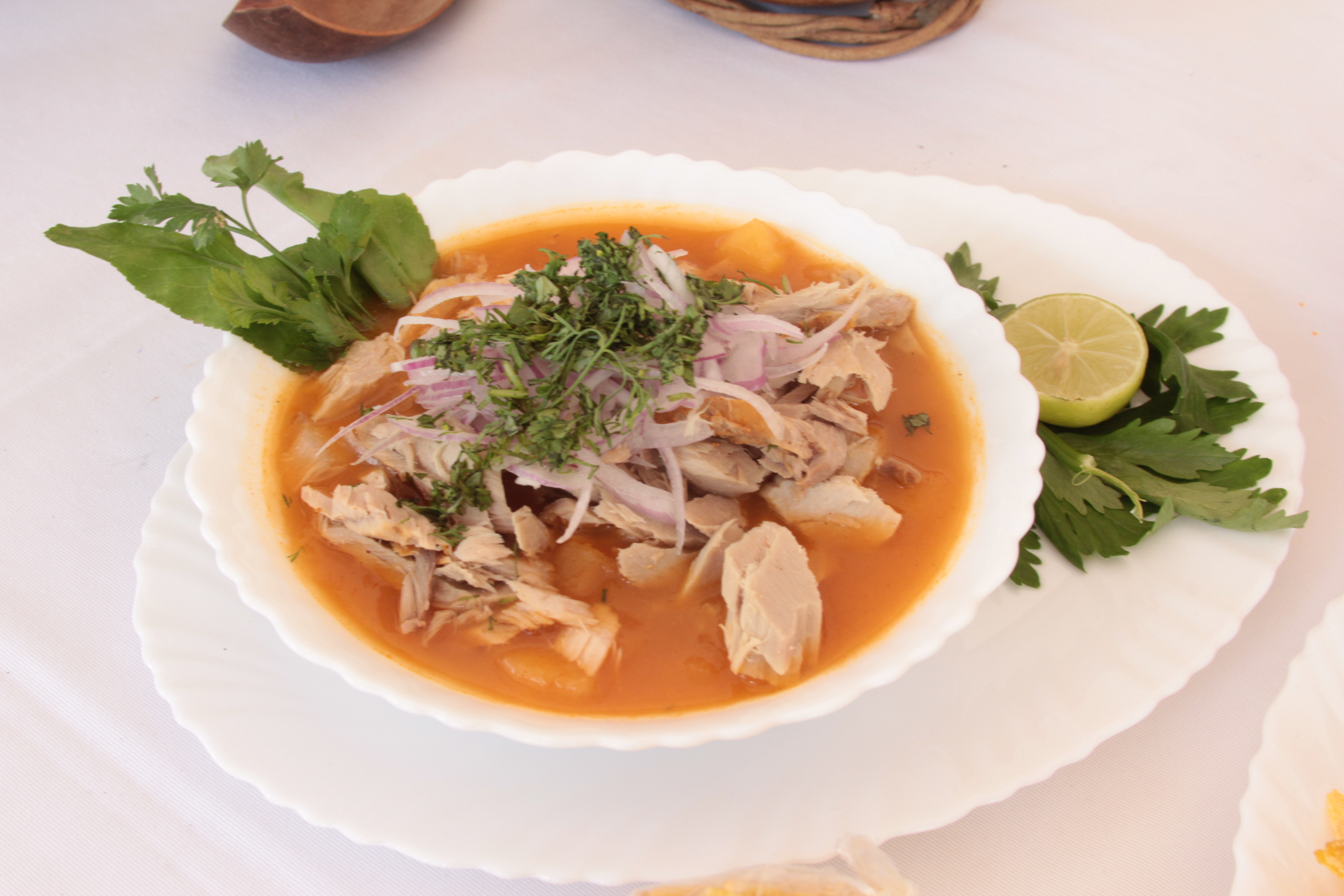
- Type: Fish stew
- Course: Main course
- Place of origin: Ecuador
- Main ingredients: Fish (albacore or other tuna or billfish), cassava, pickled red onions

Encebollado (Spanish: onionized, participle of “encebollar” to onionize/to make in onions) is an onion-dressed fish stew from Ecuador, where it is regarded as a national dish.

Although known throughout Ecuador, the dish is most popular in the country's coastal region. It is served with boiled cassava and pickled red onion rings. A dressing of onion is prepared with fresh tomato and spices such as pepper or coriander leaves. It is commonly prepared with albacore, but tuna, billfish, or bonito may also be used. It should be served with lime, toasted corn, and plantain chipsknown as chifles.

It possibly originates from the Basque dish by the name of marmitako.

Encebollado is usually served with plantain chips or bread as side dishes. It may be garnished with lime juice and chili sauce. People in Ecuador eat it for breakfast, lunch, or dinner. Restaurants that sell only this dish start serving it in the early morning.

It is popular to consume early in the morning after a night of drinking to cure a "chuchaqui" or hangover.

== See also ==
- List of Ecuadorian dishes and foods
- List of onion dishes
