= Rodolfo Hinostroza =

Peruvian poet and writer

Rodolfo Hinostroza (October 27, 1941 – November 1, 2016) was a Peruvian poet, writer, journalist, food critic, and astrologer. He was born in Lima.

== Early life ==
In 1962, he left Peru with a scholarship to study philosophy and English literature at the University San Cristobal of La Habana. There, he wrote his first poetry book, "Consejero del Lobo," published by "Editorial El Puente" in 1964. Frustrated by the way the Castro regime was using scholarship students for his political ends, he managed to leave in 1964, after a series of intense experiences on the island, and returned to Lima.

== Journalism ==
He worked as a scriptwriter on Peruvian TV for some time and then started working in journalism, among other things, and joined the reputed magazine Caretas.

In 1968, he married French-born Nadine Caillière and traveled back with her to Paris, where he lived until 1984. He arrived in Paris in the midst of the 1968 student turmoil, which would have a direct impact on his poetry. He worked in several places, such as ORTF Radio; publishing group Gallimard; as a translator for Spanish publishers like Tusquets (he also translated for future Nobel Prize winner Le Clézio, among others); and Barral. In 1972, he won the international poetry award "Maldoror" with his poetry book "Contranatura," organized by Barral Editores (Barcelona, Spain) with Octavio Paz at the head of the jury. In addition, he also worked with French/Peruvian tour operator "Uniclam," who entrusted him to write several tourist guides: Mexico (1976), Bolivia (1978), and Peru (1981), all published in French. In 1979, he published "Aprendizaje de la limpieza," a result of his seven-year psychoanalytical experience, which he had started in Lima and finished in 1975 in Paris.

== Gastronomy ==
In 1984, he returned to Peru, where he met Dutch translator Ingrid Sipkes, with whom he formed a family and had three children: Cayetana (1985), Lorenzo (1989), and Ruy (1991). He resumed his journalistic activities at Caretas, specializing this time in gastronomy. After 15 years of a French gastronomic background, he was still pleasantly surprised by the Peruvian cuisine he discovered upon his return to Peru. From 1984 to 2006, he wrote many articles about Limeño cuisine and Limeño restaurants in the newspaper La Republica, Caretas, and Anfitrion (his own gourmet restaurant guide), preceding the present Peruvian gastronomic revolution. He also had his own gastronomic/astrological radio program at Radio 1160 for a year and a half, together with his sister, Gloria Hinostroza, who taught about Peruvian cuisine at Cordon Bleu Peru. Finally, he published a luxury Peruvian cuisine book, titled "Primicias de Cocina Peruana" (Everest, 2005). This book included various Peruvian recipes with full-color photographs and also an essay about the history of Peruvian cuisine. The book was awarded three international prizes (2nd place Spanish National Gastronomic Academy in 2005, 1st place Gourmand Award 2006, and 2nd place Latin Book Award NY 2006).

== Writing and poetry ==
In 1987, he was awarded first place in Juan Rulfo International Short Story Award for "El Benefactor." In 1994 he published "Fata Morgana," and in 1997 he won the national "Arte Nuevo" prize for his play "Cuadrando el Círculo," a comedy that traveled throughout Peru and had an audience of over 75,000 viewers. In 2001, he published his short stories book "Cuentos de Extremo Occidente," and in 2005, after a long hiatus, "Memorial de Casa Grande." In June 2006, "Extensión de la Palabra" was published by Mexican group Aldus, an anthology of his poetry, theater, and short stories. In 2007, Visor Editores from Spain published his "Poesía Completa." In 2009, he was granted the prestigious Guggenheim Fellowship. In July 2012, Tribal Editores published "Pararrayos de Dios," a compendium of short chronicles where he describes a series of juicy personal experiences with some reputed deceased Peruvian poet-colleagues. In November 2013, he was awarded the National Award of Culture 2013, Category Career, by the Peruvian Ministry of Culture and PetroPeru. Hinostroza died at the age of 75 on November 1, 2016, leaving 7 unpublished books.

== Awards ==
- 1972 Maldoror Poetry Award, Barcelona, Spain, "Contranatura"
- 1987 First prize, Juan Rulfo International Short Story Award, Paris, France, "The Benefactor"
- 1997 Arte Nuevo Theatre Award, Lima, Peru, "Squaring the circle"
- 2006 Gourmand Award Best Foreign Language Book, Peking, China, "Primicias de Cocina Peruana"
- 2007 National Gastronomic Academy, 2nd prize, Madrid, Spain, "Primicias de Cocina Peruana"
- 2007 Latino Book Awards, 2nd prize, New York, USA, "Primicias de Cocina Peruana"
- 2009 Guggenheim Fellowship, Washington, DC, USA
- 2013 National Award of Culture 2013, Category Career, Lima, Peru

== Poetry ==
- "PROBLEMAS CON BRABANCIO"; "LOS HUESOS DE MI PADRE", Universidad de Chile
- Consejero del Lobo, La Habana: Fondo de Cultura Popular, 1965
- Contranatura, Barcelona: Barral Editores, 1971
- Poemas Reunidos, Mosca Azul Editores, 1986

=== Novels ===
- Aprendizaje de la Limpieza, Barcelona: Tusquets, 1978
- Fata Morgana, ASA Ediciones, 1994
- Cuentos de extremo occidente, Fondo Editorial PUCP, 2002, ISBN 978-9972-42-460-1

=== Plays ===
- Apocalipsis de una noche de verano, Instituto Nacional de Cultura, 1988

=== Non-fiction ===
- El Sistema astrológico, Barcelona: Barral, 1973, ISBN 978-84-211-7237-7
- Guía de México (Paris, 1977)
- Guía del Perú (París, 1986)
- Guía de Bolivia (París, 1989).

=== Anthologies ===
- "Contra Natura", Antología de la poesía erótica española e hispanoamericana, Editor Pedro Provencio, EDAF, 2003, ISBN 978-84-414-0893-7
- Poesía latinoamericana: antología bilingüe, Editor Mario Laventi, Epsilon Editores, 1998, ISBN 978-958-96377-0-8
