= Jacuí (disambiguation) =

- Jacuí municipality in the state of Minas Gerais in the Southeast region of Brazil.
- Salto do Jacuí is a municipality in the state Rio Grande do Sul, Brazil.
- Vila Jacuí, district in the subprefecture of São Miguel Paulista in São Paulo, Brazil.
- Jacuí River, river in Rio Grande do Sul state of southern Brazil.
- Jacuí River, river of São Paulo state in southeastern Brazil.
- Jacuí-Mirim River, river of Rio Grande do Sul state in southern Brazil.
