= Uchu Jacu =

Flour from six grains

Uchu Jacu (or Uchujacu; Quichua for hot flour) is a traditional flour produced from six different grains, originating from the Cayambe region in the northern part of the Ecuadorian province of Pichincha. After the recipe had almost been forgotten during some time, the flour is being produced again today in the mills of the organization UNOPAC. Though the flour is relatively little known, it is still very popular with the members of the various indigenous communities in the area.

== Production ==
The production of Uchu Jacu marks an elaborate process; wheat, barley, corn, pea, lentil and field bean are being used as ingredients. In order to assure a high level of pureness, the grains are sorted by hand and toasted. Subsequently, garlic, annatto and cumin are added to the assorted grains and eventually the mixture is ground. Eventually, the flour is sieved another time and packed.

== Application ==
According to tradition, Uchu Jacu is exclusively being used to make a very nutritive soup; although the full traditional recipe requires adding potatoes, onion, hominy, eggs, cream cheese and guinea pig, this version can be altered at will. Uchu Jacu resembles potato soup in appearance as well as in consistency, but develops a quite distinct flavor.

== See also ==
- List of Ecuadorian dishes and foods
