= T'anta wawa =

Dessert

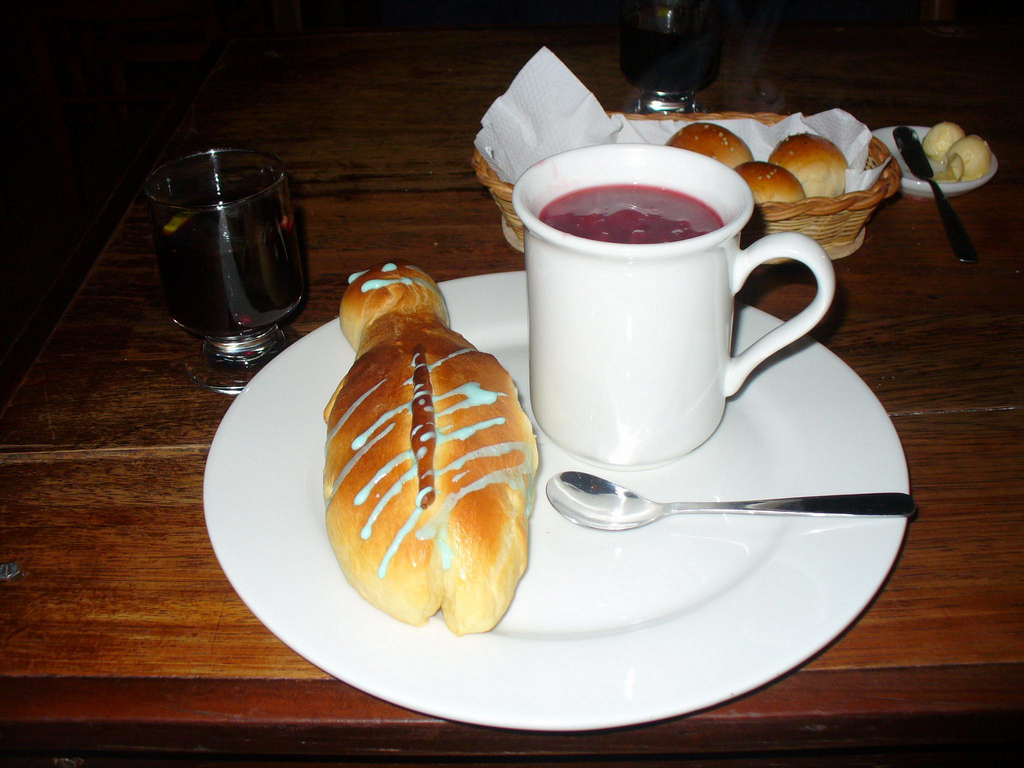
- T'anta wawa served with colada morada
- Type: Sweet roll
- Region or state: Central Andes
- Main ingredients: Wheat flour

T'anta wawa ("bread baby", from Aymara and Quechua t'anta "bread" and wawa "child, baby"; hispanicized names: guagua de pan, tantaguaguas, tantahuahua, wawas de pan, tantawawas and muñecas de pan) is a type of sweet roll shaped and decorated in the form of a small child or infant. They are generally made of wheat and sometimes contain a sweet filling. They are made and eaten as part of ancestral rites in Andean regions of Bolivia, Ecuador, Peru, the south of Colombia, and the north of Argentina, mainly on All Souls' Day, but also as part of agricultural festivals, carnivals, and Christmas.

== Regional characteristics ==
=== Ecuador ===
T'anta wawa is consumed on November 2 all over the Andean region. They are eaten with colada morada. They are made by families and exchanged among groups of family and friends and given to godchildren. In rural cemeteries and indigenous communities, such as Tungurahua Province, they are used as offerings as part of a ceremony of encounter with one's ancestors.

== Peru ==
The bread guaguas, tanta wawas or tantaguaguas are part of the celebrations on All Souls' Day especially in Ayacucho, Junin, Ancash, Pasco, Puno, Tacna, Apurimac, Cusco and Arequipa.

== See also ==
- Pan de muerto
- List of Peruvian dishes
- List of Ecuadorian dishes and foods
- Bolivian cuisine
