= Chifle =

Fried plantain chip dish

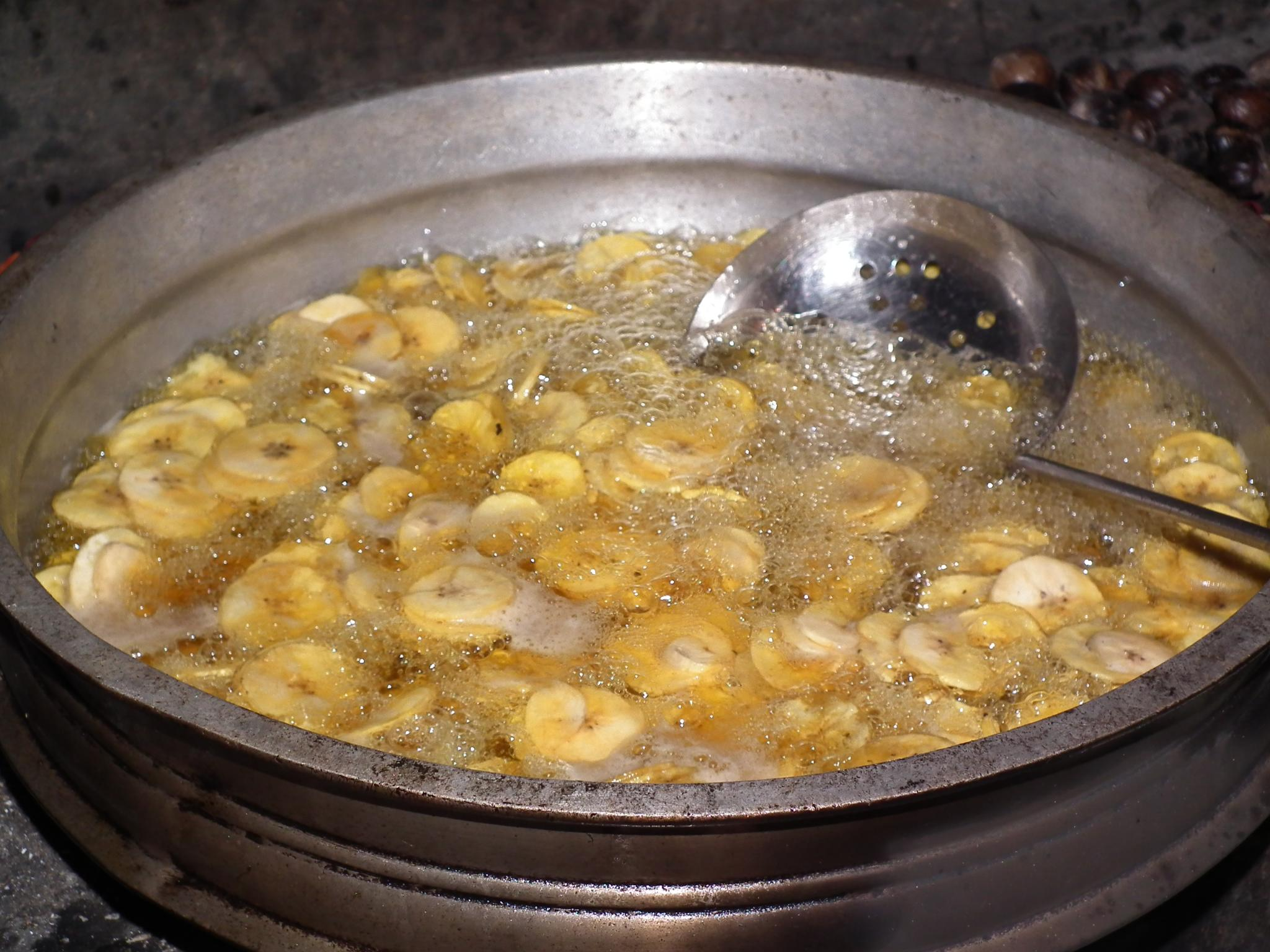
Preparation of chifles in Ecuador

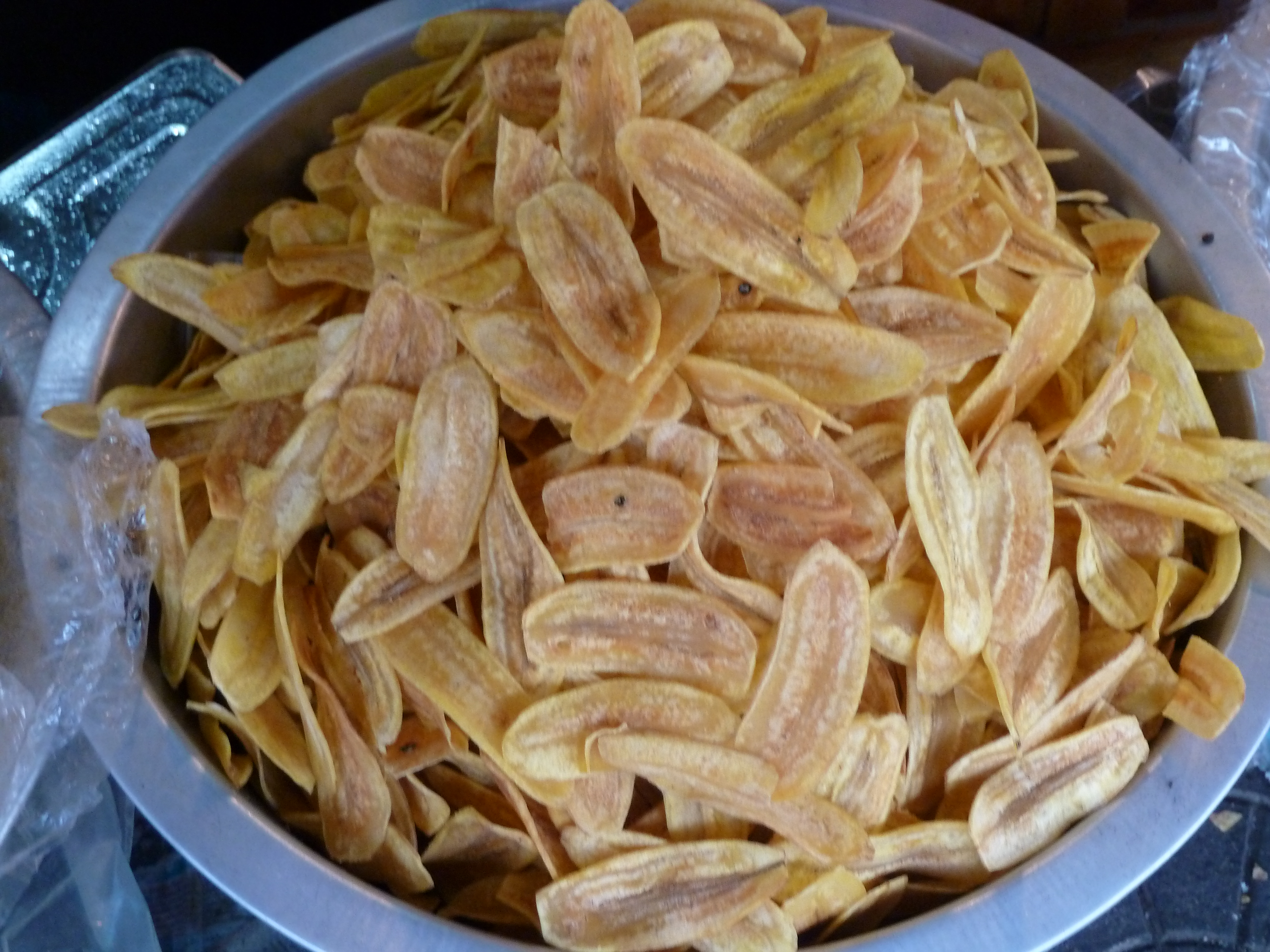
Chifles in Thailand are known as ‘banana chips‘.

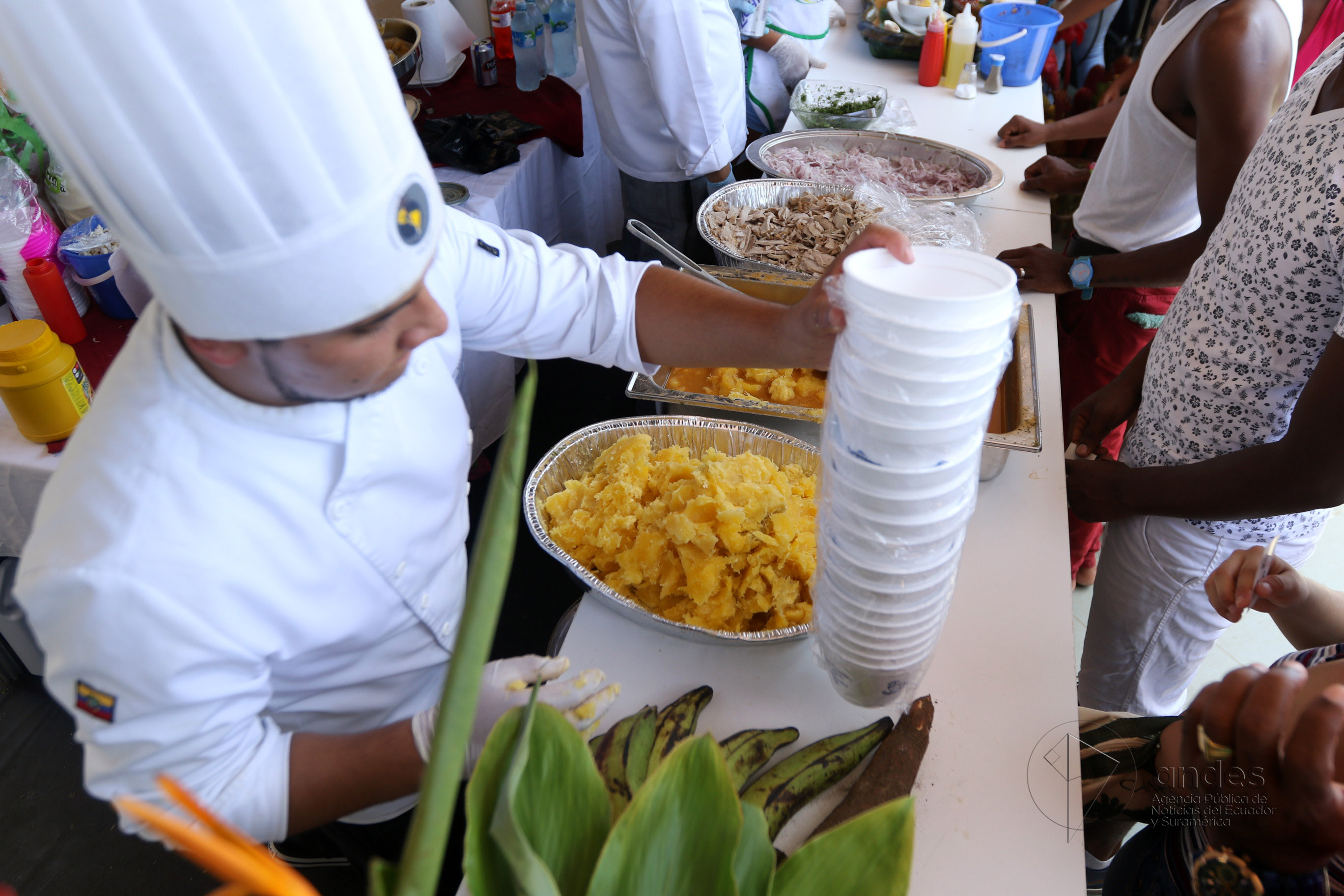
Chifles in the 2017 Encebollado World Cup (Esmeraldas, Ecuador)

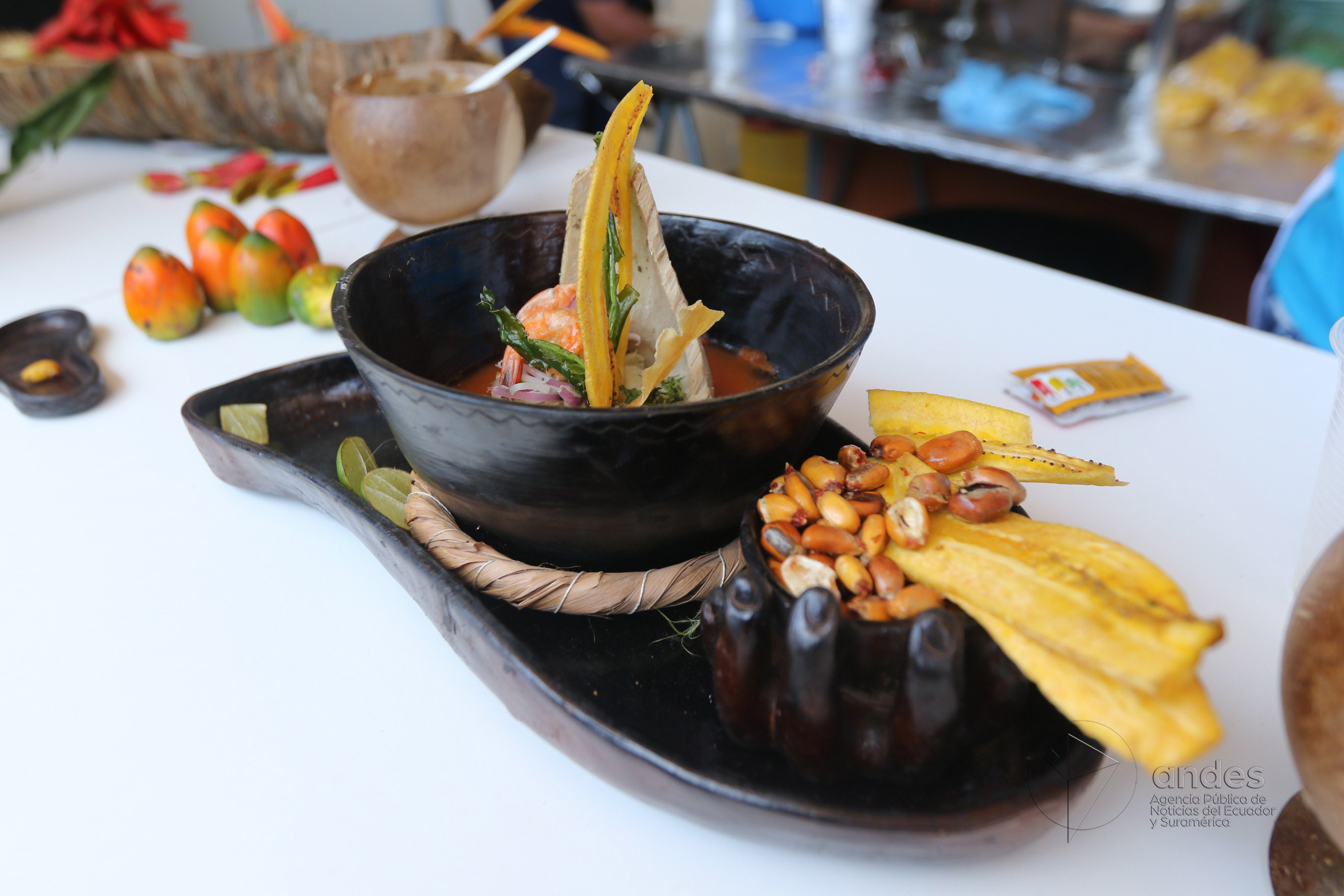
Gastronomy of Ecuador

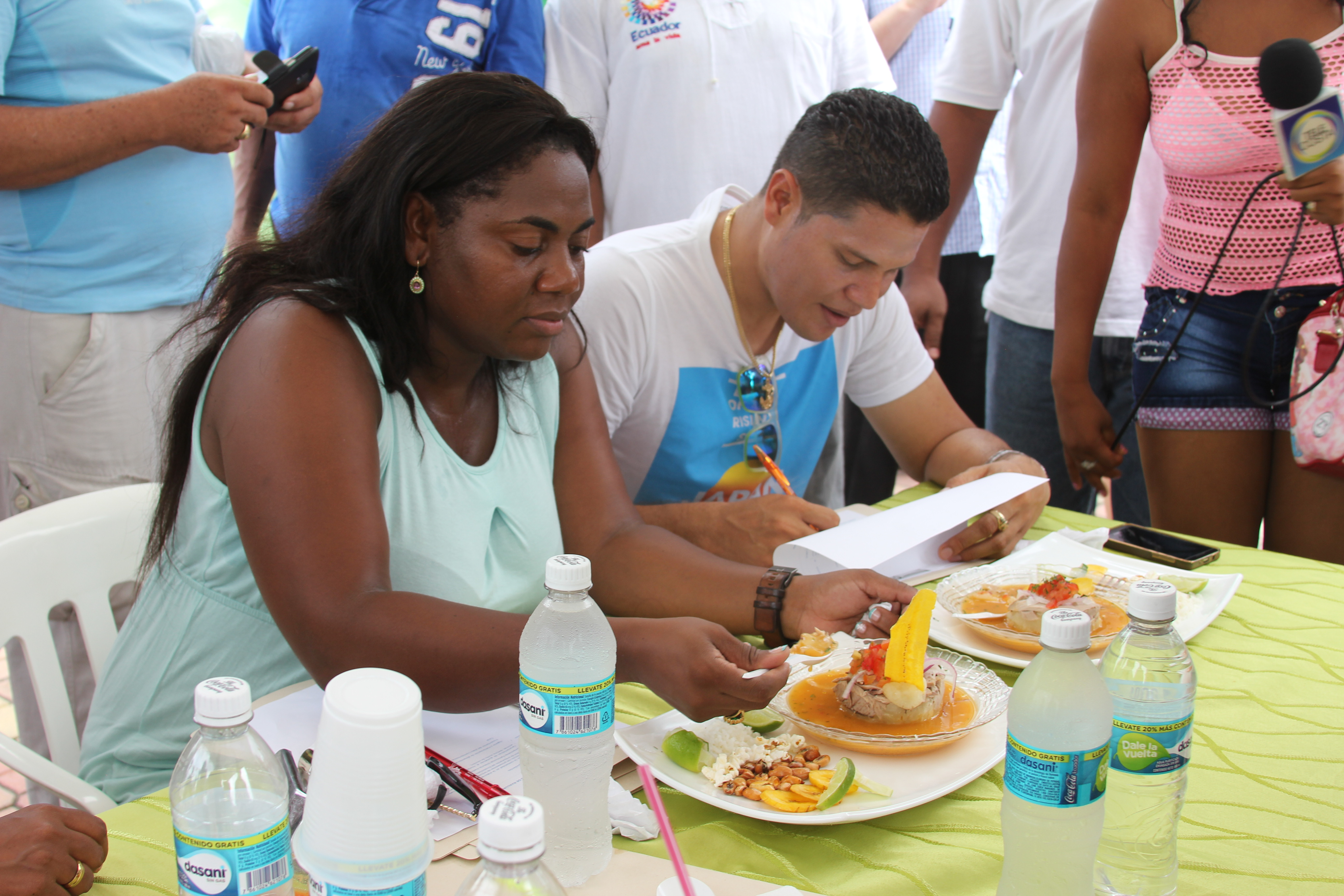
Chifles in the 2015 Encebollado World Cup (Esmeraldas, Ecuador)

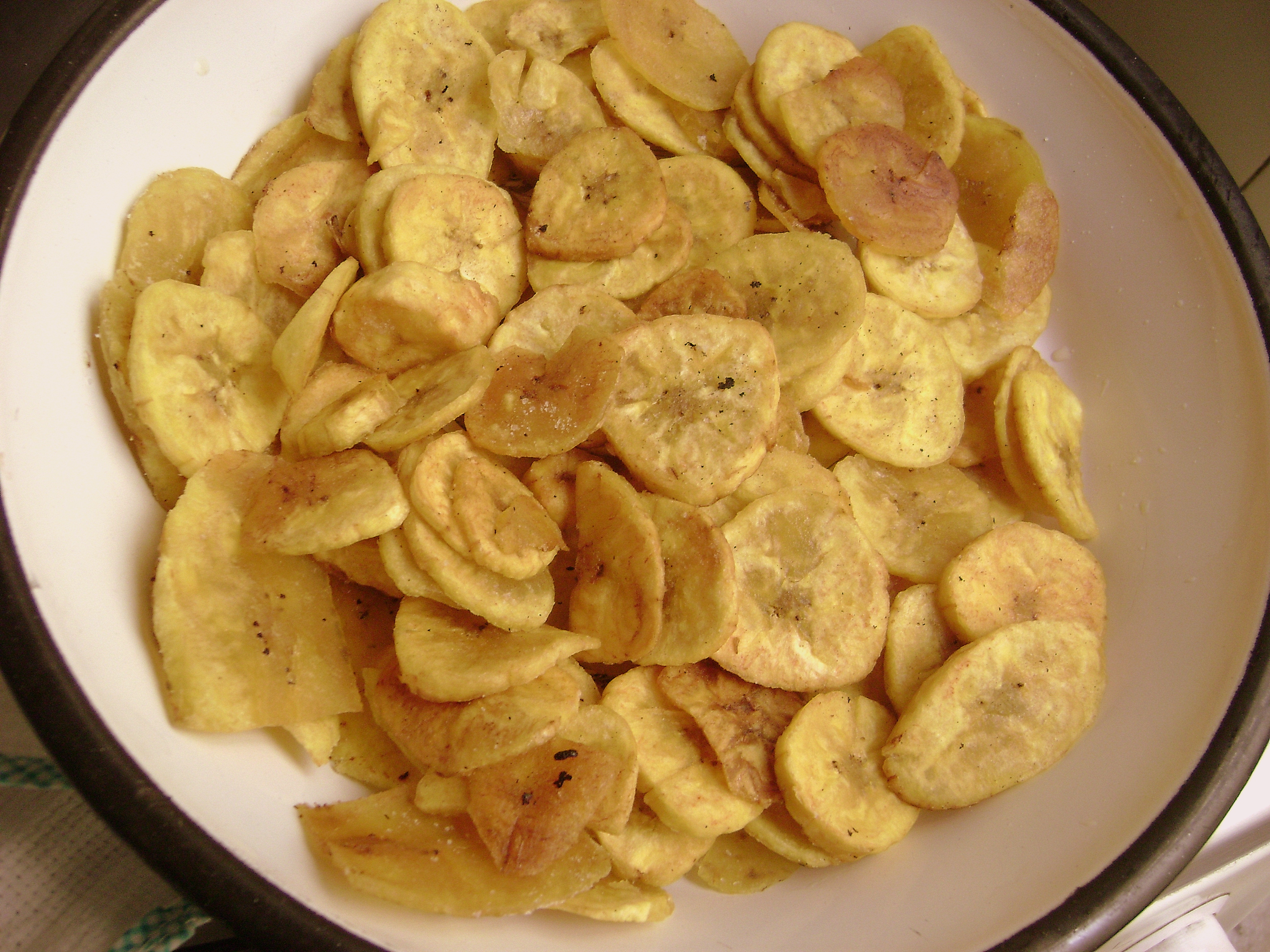
Round homemade chifles in Guayaquil, Ecuador

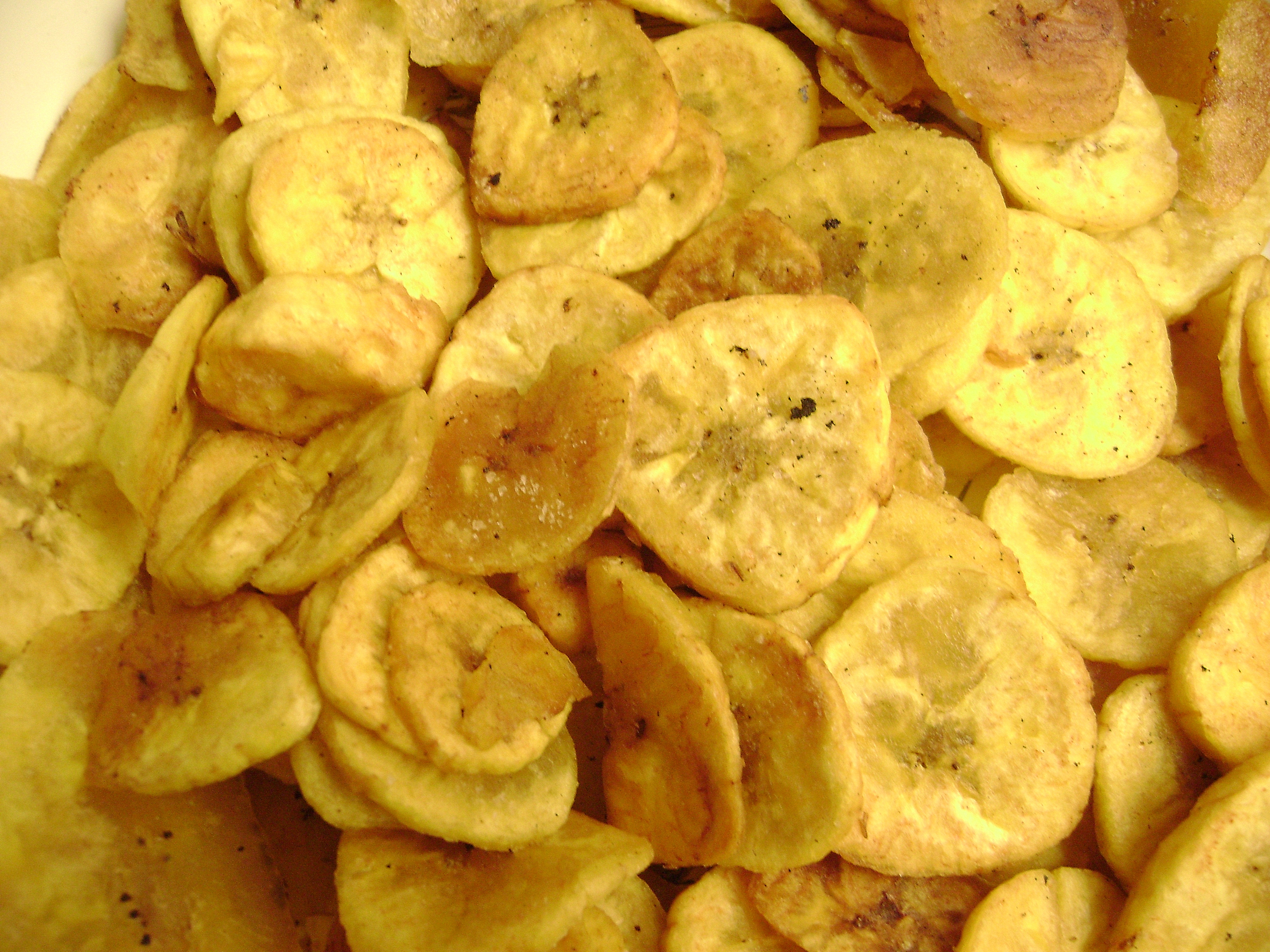
Detailed close-up of chifles

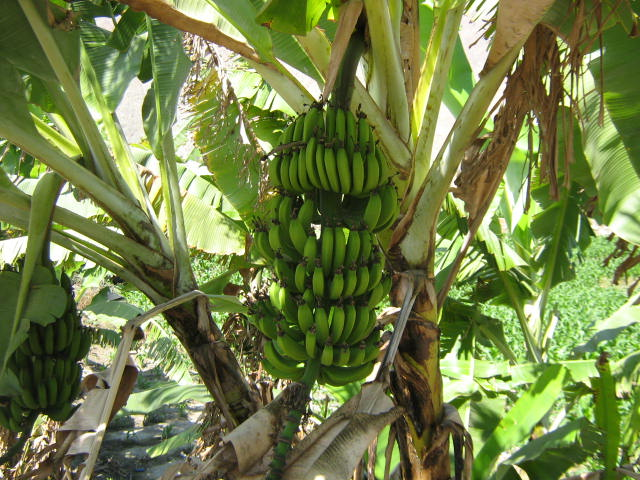
Ecuatorial plantain

Chifles, fried plantain chips, are a side dish, snack food, or finger food of Ecuador, Thailand, and Peru.

== In Ecuador ==
The cuisine of Ecuador is based on different uses of fried bananas, such as the chifle, which serves as a companion in the Ecuadorian breakfast. The chifle is consumed in soups such as encebollado and in cold dishes such as ceviche. In Ecuador there is the salt and sweet chifle with Banchis as main brands for the city of Quito and Tortolines de inalecsa that covers the Guayaquil market consuming many of other brands throughout the country.

== Process ==
An incision is made in the peel the full length of the plantain, and the peel is removed by hand. The plantains are immediately placed in salt water. Then the plantain is cut into thin slices, either across (round slices, like chips), or lengthwise (strips). The plantain slices are cooked in hot oil until golden and crispy. Then they are seasoned with salt.

A more crispy variety of chifle is prepared and packaged in factories. This includes sweet, savory, and spicy varieties. The commercial production and export of chifle was a product of the fact that Southamerican travelers were interested in the uses of plantains. Early 19th-century travelers on ships entering and leaving the port of Guayaquil were served chifle (instead of bread) with meals, including breakfast, and discovered its use as a snack food.

== In Peru ==
In Peru chifle is typical of the Piura Region. It consists of fried slices or strips of either ripe or green plantains seasoned with salt to taste. In the region of Piura, chifle is traditionally fried in wood-burning stoves with wood of the algorrobo blanco (a species of mesquite tree), which gives chifle a special aroma and taste. Depending on the type of plantain (ripe or green) the flavor can be sweet or savory. Sometimes it is served with cancha serrana (pan-roasted maize) or shredded cecina (pork jerky).

At present, the Asociación de Productores de Chifles Piuranos (APROCHIP, English: Piura Chifle Producers Association) has initiated the process to declare chifle as a producto de bandera nacional (English: flagship product) of Peru. APROCHIP of Piura is an agglomeration of 14 local commercial chifle producers.

== Etymology ==
The word "chifle" is of unknown origin and does not appear in the dictionary of the Spanish language. In the rural social environment of the Ecuadorian coast, principally in the provinces of "Montubio" cultural origin, "chiflar" was a vulgar and colloquial term that means to "whistle" with the mouth in a notably sharp sound by pinching the bottom lip and pushing air out from the lungs, resulting in a strong sound (sometimes pleasant or unpleasant) to catch the listener's attention. In the Montubia ethnic culture of the coast of Ecuador, this sound was popularly used to call family or close kinsmen from long distances.

According to Peruvian historians, the term "chifle" most likely comes from the Arabic "chofre", which in Medieval Spain was used to refer to the blade of the sword, lending the name to the snack food of fried plantains sliced into circles with the blade of a sword. Another view is that "chifle" means horn (or antler) and the term was used because of the resemblance between the two. A third view suggests that the term originates from the whistling sound made while eating the snack.

== Similar preparations in other countries ==
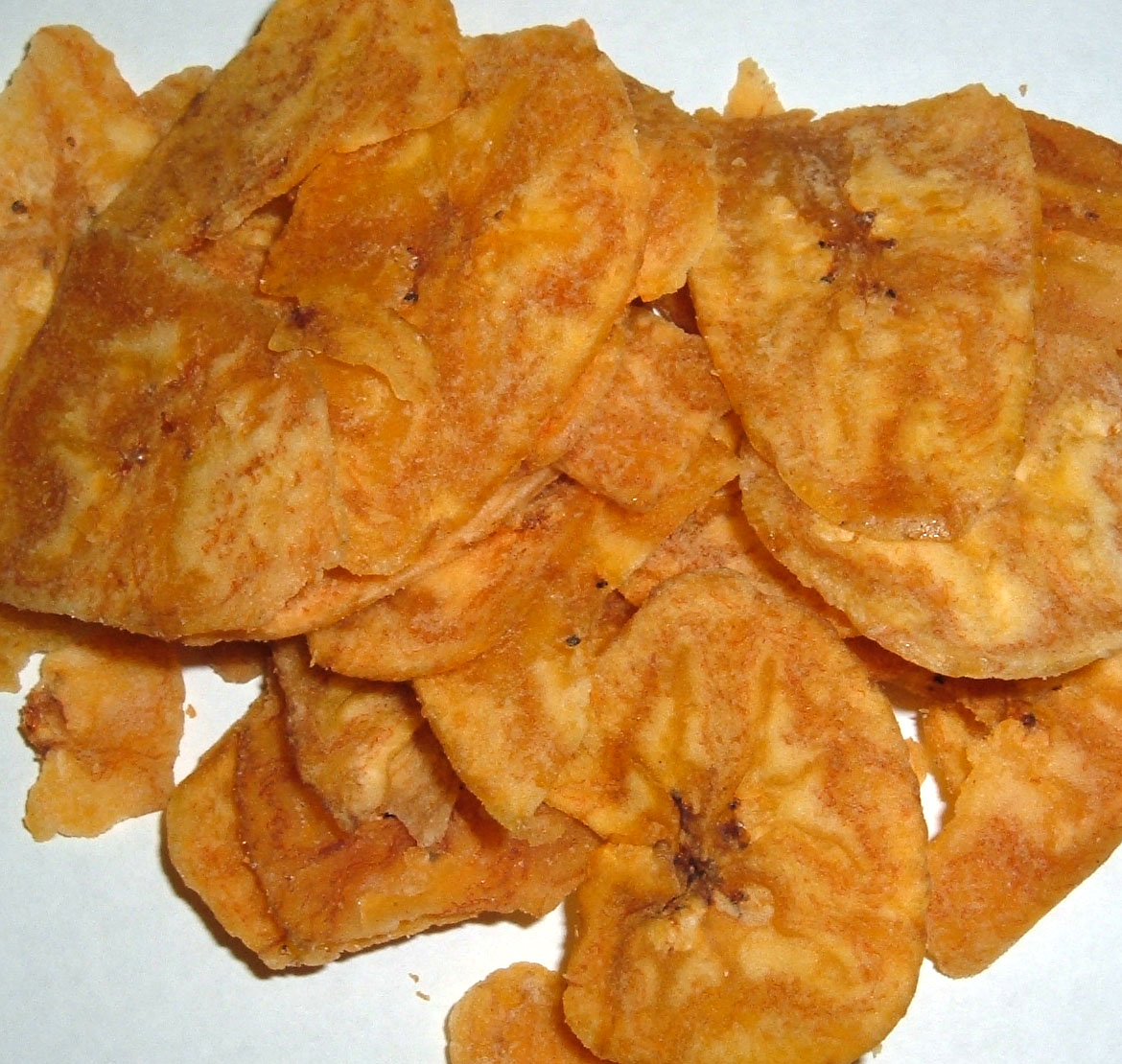
Platanutres from Puerto Rico

Every tropical country where the plantain is in high consumption has its local version of this snack. It is known as chipilo in Bolivia; plataninas in Guatemala; nenthrakayyi varuthathu or plantain chips in Kerala, South India; mariquitas (English: lady bugs) in Cuba; in Puerto Rico platanutres, platanitos in the Dominican Republic and Nicaragua, and tostones or tostoncitos in Venezuela.

More recently, both ordinary and specially flavoured chifles have entered the European market as "plantain chips", produced and distributed by Fyffes of Ireland.

== See also ==
- Banana chips
- Ecuadorian cuisine
- Peruvian cuisine
- Plantain
- Tostones
