= Espumilla =

Ecuadorian whipped dessert

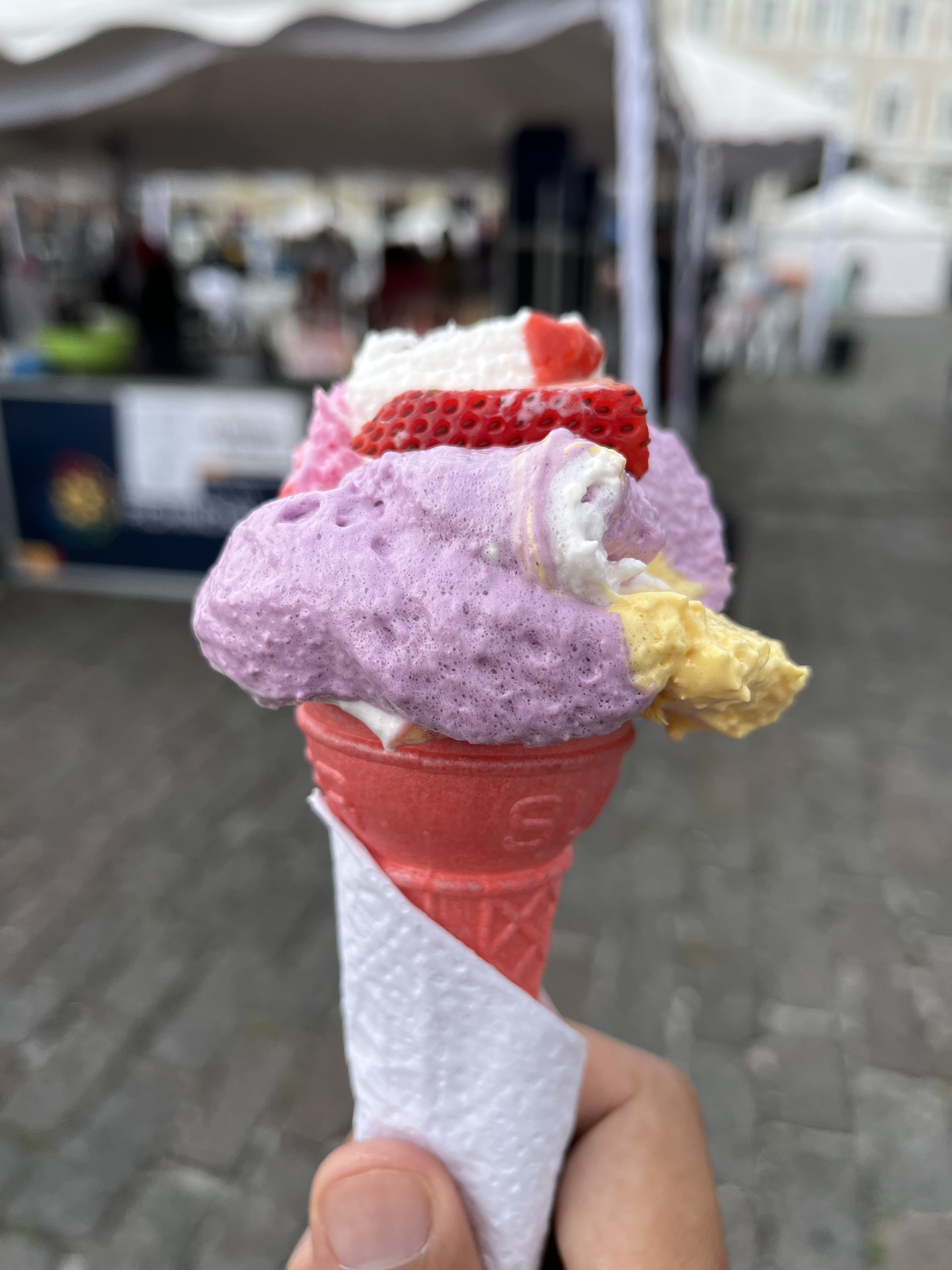
- Espumilla
- Type: Whipped dessert
- Course: Dessert
- Place of origin: Ecuador
- Region or state: Quito
- Associated cuisine: Ecuadorian cuisine
- Serving temperature: Room temperature
- Main ingredients: Egg whites, sugar, and fruit pulp, often guava

Espumilla is a traditional Ecuadorian meringue and popular street food. The word "espumilla" means "foam" in Spanish. It possibly is dated back to 1907 with records mentioning its existence. It is made with egg whites, sugar, and fruit pulp, often guava, frequently whipped by hand to achieve the right texture. It resembles ice cream and is often sold in ice cream cones.

Originally from downtown Quito, it is now sold by street vendors across Ecuador, including schools, plazas, and fruit markets. Espumilla can vary in flavor and garnishes, sometimes topped with syrup called arrope de mora. The two most common flavors are guava and blackberry in Ecuador. However, other flavors include banana, strawberries, and naranjilla. The dessert represents a part of Ecuadorian culinary heritage and is popular among locals and tourists.

They are also found in Venezuela, Guatemala and Nicaragua.
