= Llapingacho =

Ecuadorian fried potato pancake

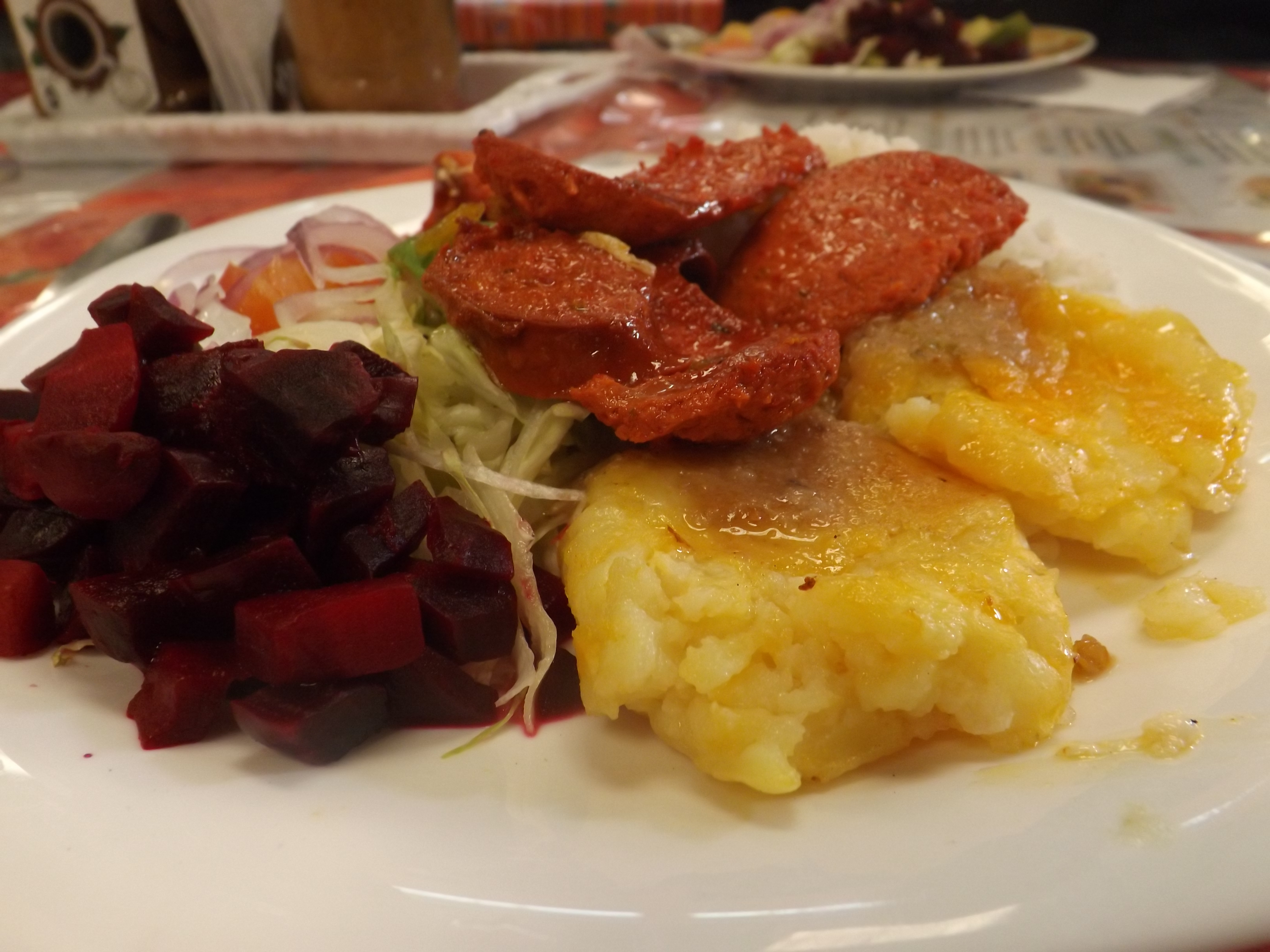
- Place of origin: Ecuador
- Main ingredients: Mashed potatoes or yuca, cheese

Llapingachos are fried potato pancakes that originated in Ecuador. They are usually served with salsa de maní, a peanut sauce. The potato patties or thick pancakes are stuffed with cheese and cooked on a hot griddle until crispy brown.

In Ecuador they are sometimes made with mashed, cooked yuca, or cassava, instead of potato. The yuca or cassava root used to make llapingachos is not to be confused with the similarly spelled yucca, the roots of which are generally not edible.

== Origin and preparation ==
Llapingachos originated in Ambato, Ecuador. It consists of fried mashed potatoes seasoned with onions, cumin and achiote for a bright orange colour and stuffed with cheese, typically queso fresco. It is characterized by its crispy exterior, creamy interior and a peppery hint from the achiote. It is generally served with baked or fried pork, and typically with avocado, sausage, fried egg, tomato and lettuce salad on the side. This dish forms part of Ecuador's culture, and is one of the representative icons of Highland food. Llapingachos are popular not only in Ecuador's Highlands but also in the coast and eastern provinces.

== See also ==
- List of Ecuadorian dishes and foods
- List of stuffed dishes
