= Misu =

Grain-based Korean beverage

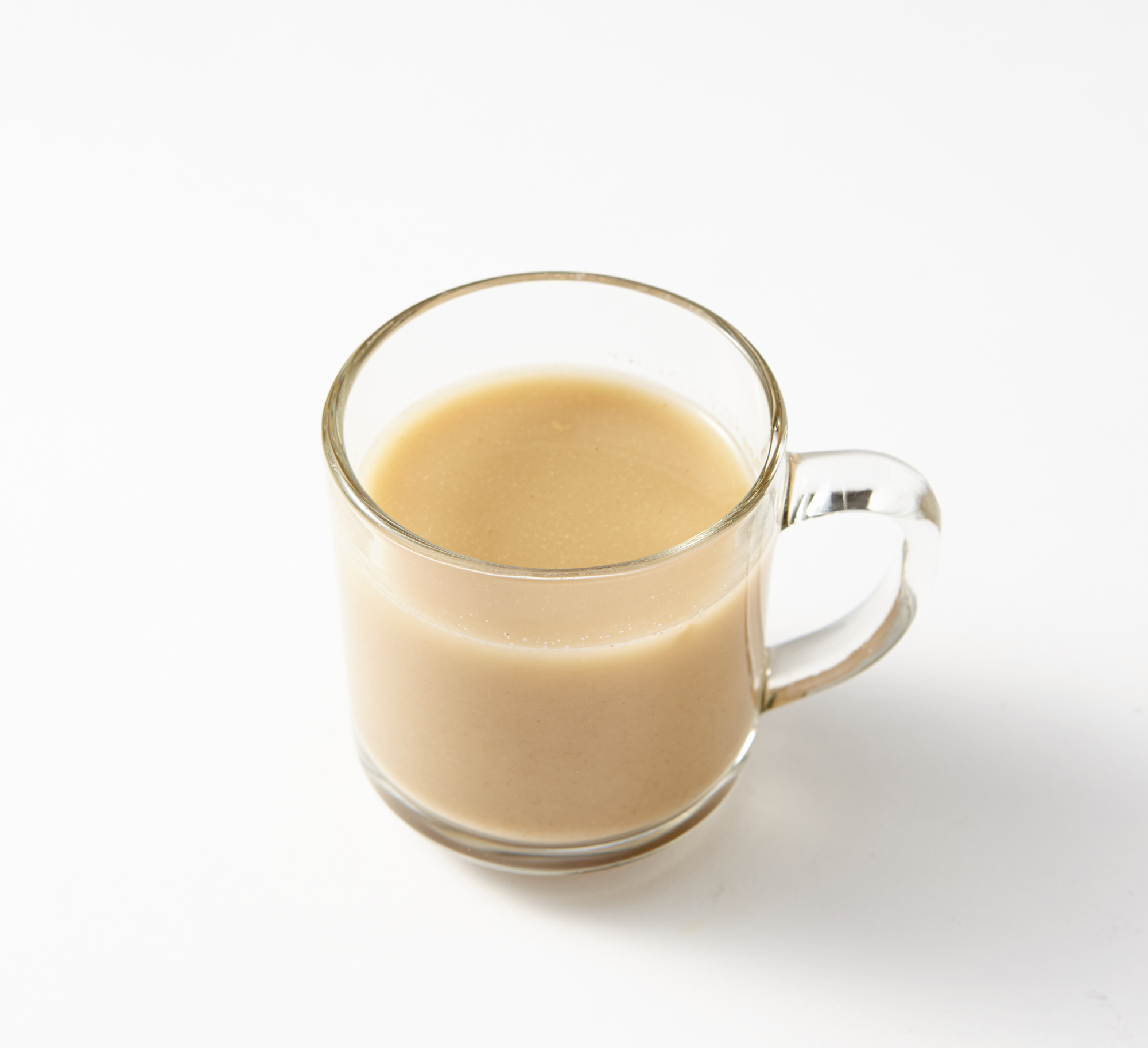
Misu

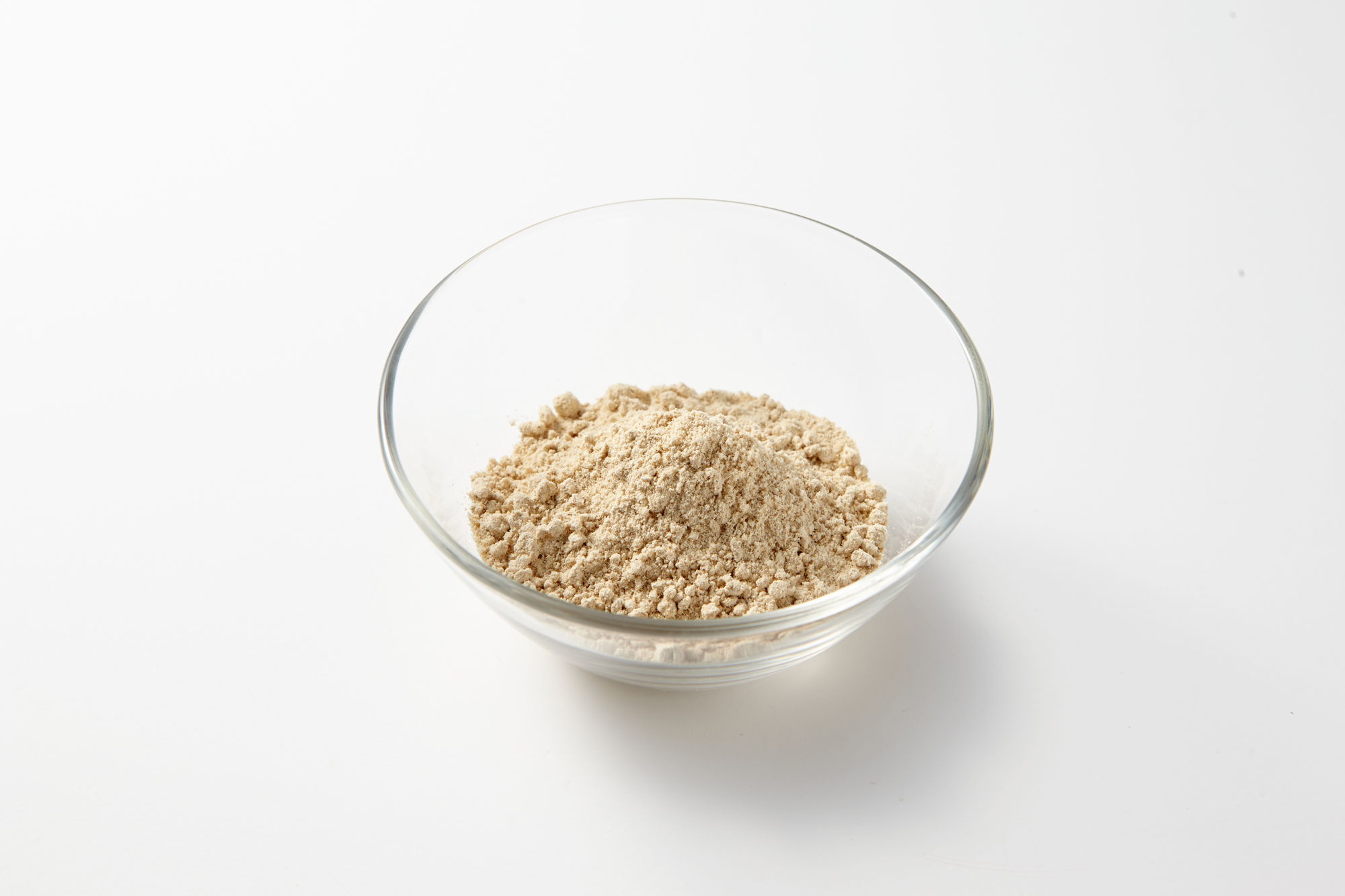
Misu-garu (misu powder)

Misu (Korean: 미수) is a beverage made from the traditional Korean grain powder misu-garu (미숫가루; misutgaru; 'misu powder'), which is a combination of 7–10 different grains. It is usually served on hot summer days to quench thirst or as an instant nutritious drink for breakfast or as a healthy snack.

In a Joseon Dynasty (1392–1897) recipe book, misu was mentioned as stir-fried barley (gu). Gu was a delicacy of that time and easy to serve as one went to travel.

Misu is made of glutinous rice and other ingredients, such as barley, yulmu (Coix lacryma-jobi var. ma-yuen), brown rice, black rice, black soybeans, corn, white beans, millet, and sesame seeds, which are ground, roasted and/or steamed, then mixed together. Misugaru is commonly added to water or milk and stirred to make a drink. Sugar or condensed milk can be added as a sweetener. The beverage is high in protein, vitamins, calcium, magnesium, molybdenum, folate, and selenium, and is a dieter's drink, as it is quite filling but low in calories.

== See also ==
- Chatang – Gruel in Beijing and Tianjin cuisine
- Gofio – Toasted flour from the Canary Islands
- Kama (food) – Traditional Finnic dish of mixed cereal flour and milk
- Rubaboo – Porridge
- Tsampa – Roasted flour for cereal
