= Mulgipuder =

Traditional dish in Estonia

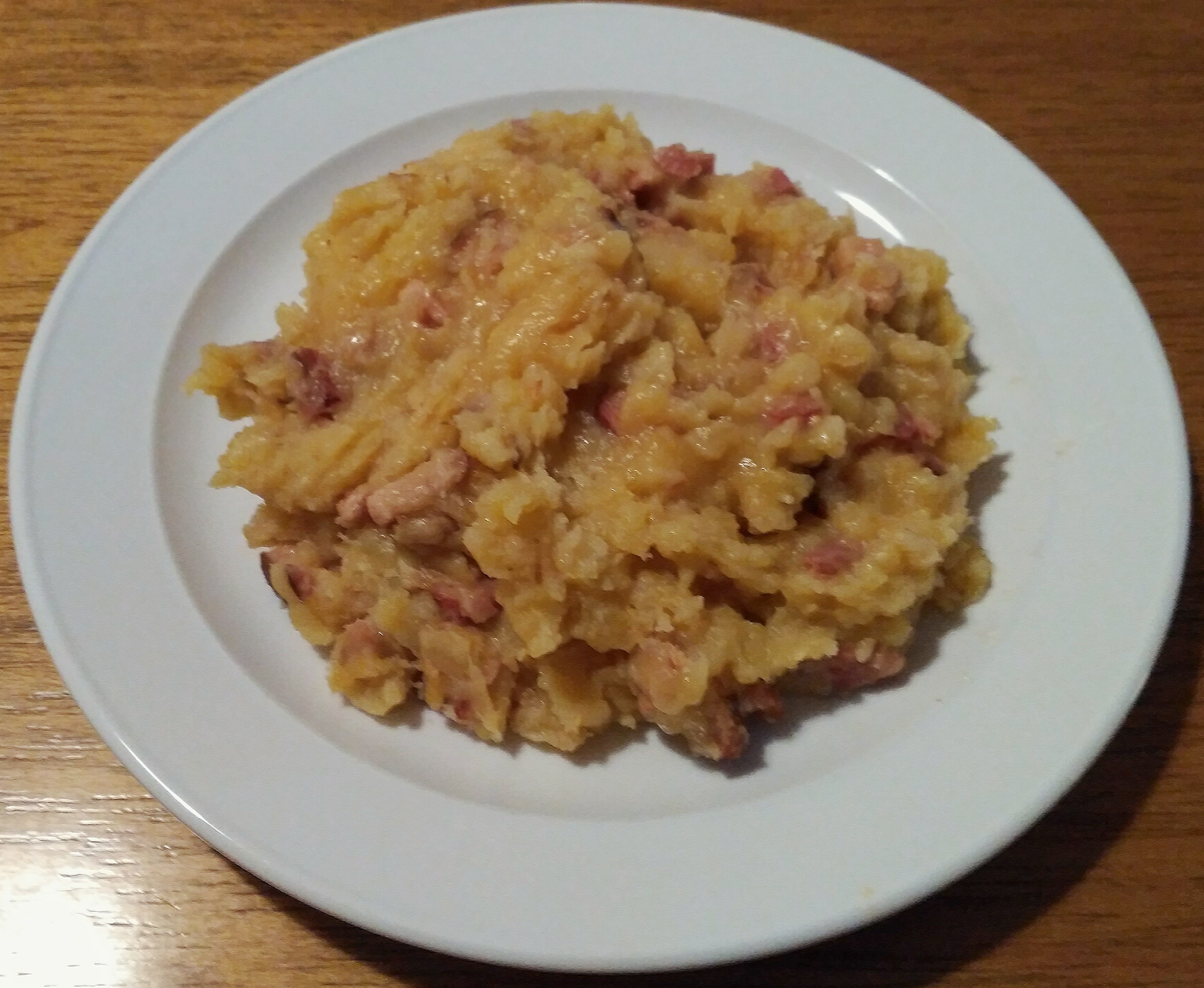
Mulgipuder

Mulgipuder (also Mulgi puder) is pieces of potatoes mixed with pearl barley and topped with fried pork.

The name literally means 'porridge from Mulgimaa (an area in southern Estonia)'; the word puder 'porridge' comes from Proto-Finnic *putro (cf. Finish puuro 'porridge'), and the modifier mulgi is the genitive of mulk 'a person from Mulgimaa', derived from Latvian muļķis, muļķe 'idiot, fool'.

Mulgipuder is the only Estonian national food that is in the UNESCO List of the Intangible Cultural Heritage of Humanity. Some claim that Mulgipuder is not in the older cookbooks. What makes this food unique to Estonia, is adding pearl barley to mashed potatoes. Many foods in Mulgimaa contain barley, as a lot of barley is grown there.

== See also ==
- Estonian cuisine
- Mulgikapsad
- Mulgimaa, a cultural–historical region in South Estonia
