= Barley bread =

Type of bread made from barley flour

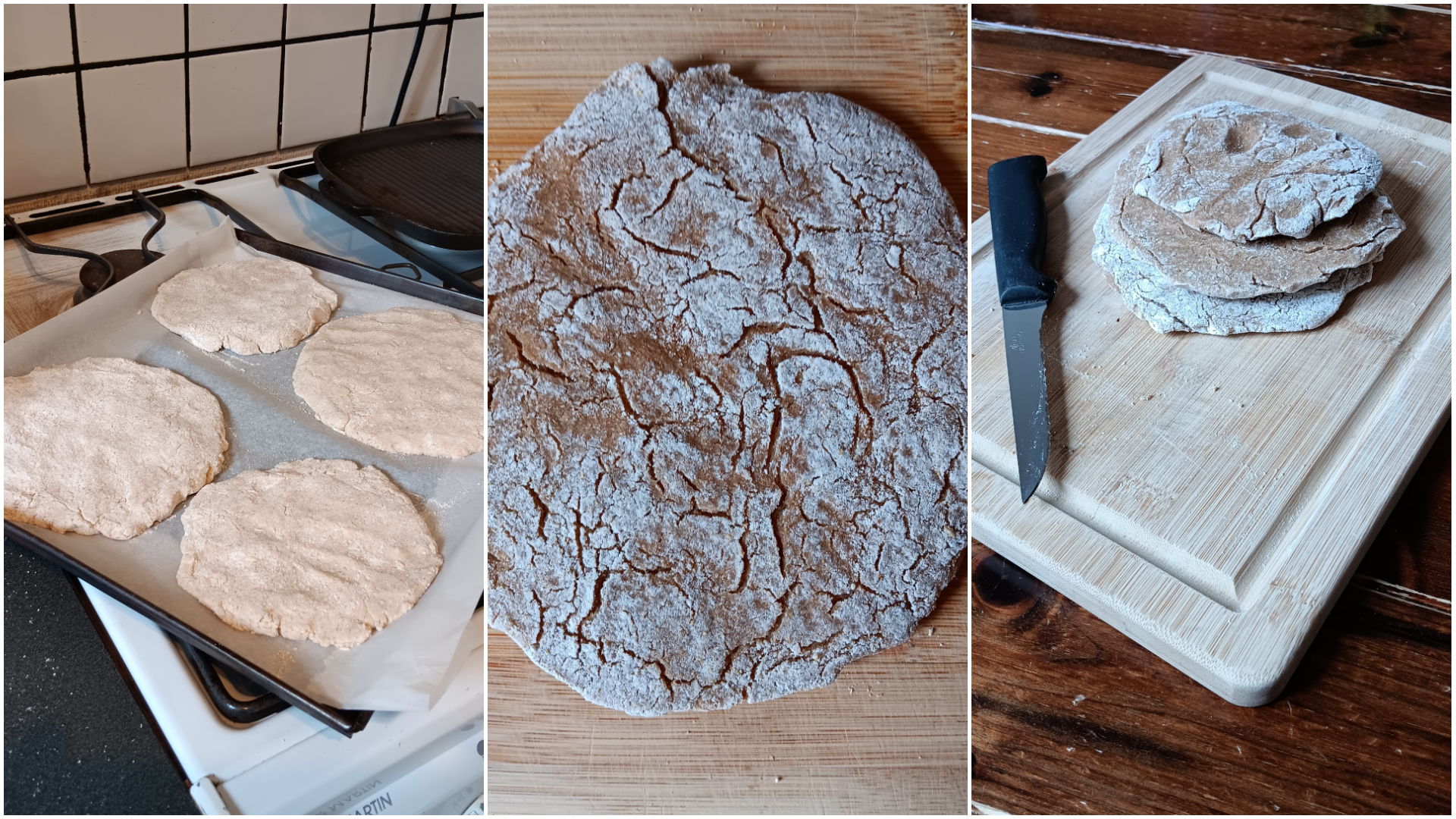
- Barley bread
- Type: Bread
- Main ingredients: Barley flour

Barley bread is a type of bread made from barley flour derived from the grain of the barley plant. In the British Isles it is a bread which dates back to the Iron Age. Today, barley flour is commonly blended (in a smaller proportion) with wheat flour to make conventional breadmaking flour.

== See also ==
- Balep korkun
- Bannock
- Chalboribbang, a Korean barley pancake or "sticky barley bread"
- Gyabrag, a Tibetan barley pancake
- Malt loaf
- Rye bread
