= Makra Stoa =

Archaeological site of the Long (Makra) Stoa of Piraeus in Athens

- Μακρά Στοά (Ancient Greek)
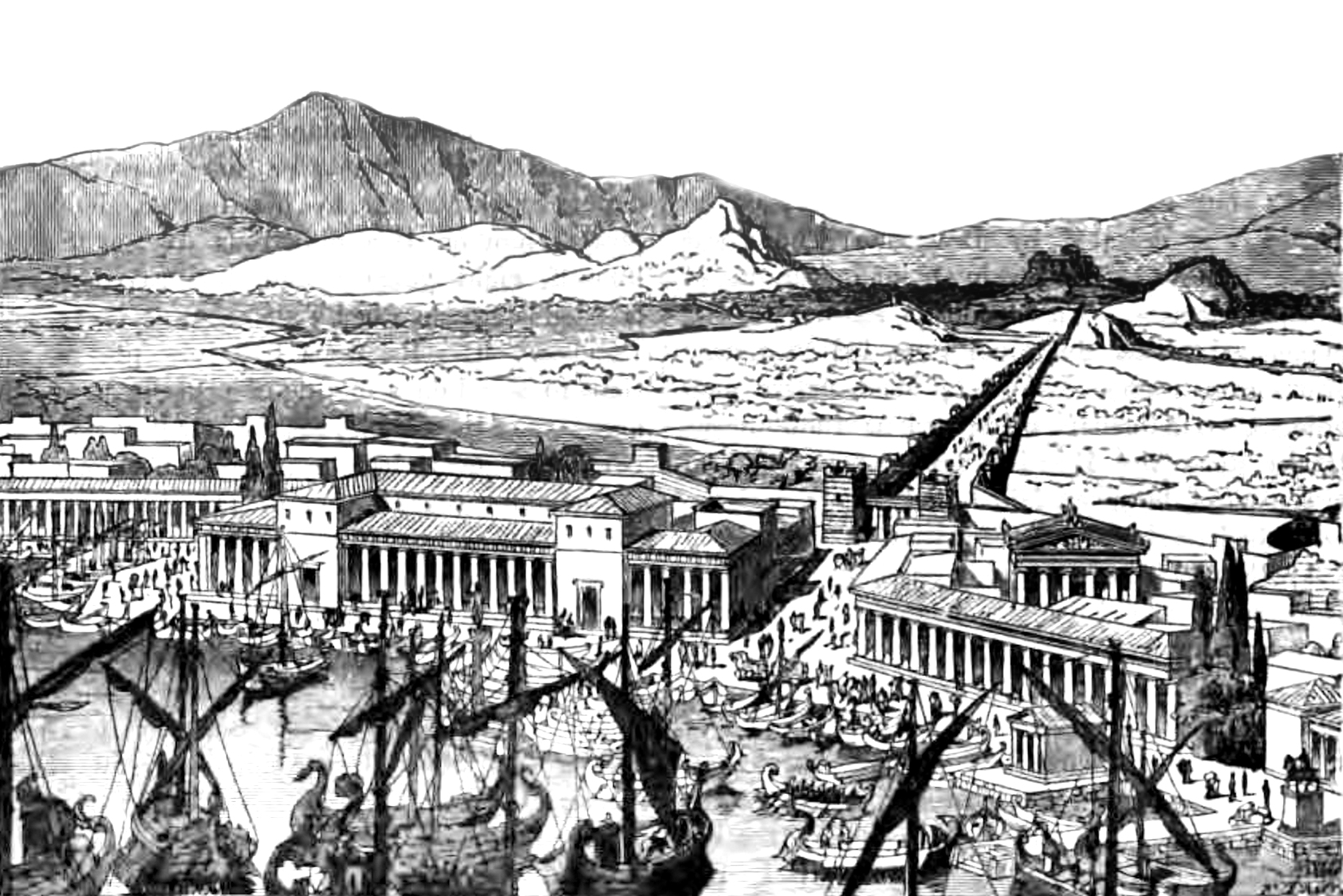
- View of Piraeus with buildings, including the Stoa
- Interactive map of Makra Stoa
- Type: Building
- Periods: Classical Period
- Cultures: Greek
- Satellite of: Athens
- Location: Piraeus, Athens
- Region: Attica

History
- Built by: Perikles

Site notes
- Material: stone
- Condition: Ruined
- Owner: Tzaneio General Hospital
- Management: Ephorate of Antiquities of West Attika, Piraeus and Islands
- Public access: Visible from road

The Makra Stoa (Greek: Μακρά Στοά, lit. 'Long Stoa') is an archaeological site which formed part of the urban fabric of the ancient city of Piraeus in Athens, Greece

== History ==
The Makra Stoa was built during the time of Pericles. It was also known as the Alphitopolis Stoa (ἀλφιτόπωλις στοά), from the Greek word alphita (barley flour). The Stoa was a long building which was used for the storage of imported cereals, mainly barley and wheat. The cereals were then transported to the main city of Athens for consumption. The Stoa also supplied the Athenian fleet of triremes and, during times of shortage, supplied the people directly.

== Structure ==
The Stoa had an open facade and colonnade on one side and on the other side had shops made up of rectangular rooms. The rooms alternated between small and large sizes (widths) and each shop had a space for supplying cereals and a grain storage area, with each area being 5 m by 3.7/3.8 m (in the case of the supply area) and 5 m by 1.7/1.9 m (in the case of the storage area).

A 5 m wide road, which supplied the shops and ran between the rear of the Stoa and the city wall, was made redundant in 411 BC when the Stoa was incorporated into the city wall.

== Archaeological site ==
The archaeological site is located on the corner of Akti Poseidonos (the main street running alongside the present-day harbour) and Dimitriou Gounari street and is fenced but visible from the road. The site is managed by the Ephorate of Antiquities of West Attika, Piraeus and Islands and is located on land which belongs to Tzaneio General Hospital. The site previously formed an urban block of the modern city and the archaeological site sits below the present ground level and is sometimes waterlogged.

== Gallery ==
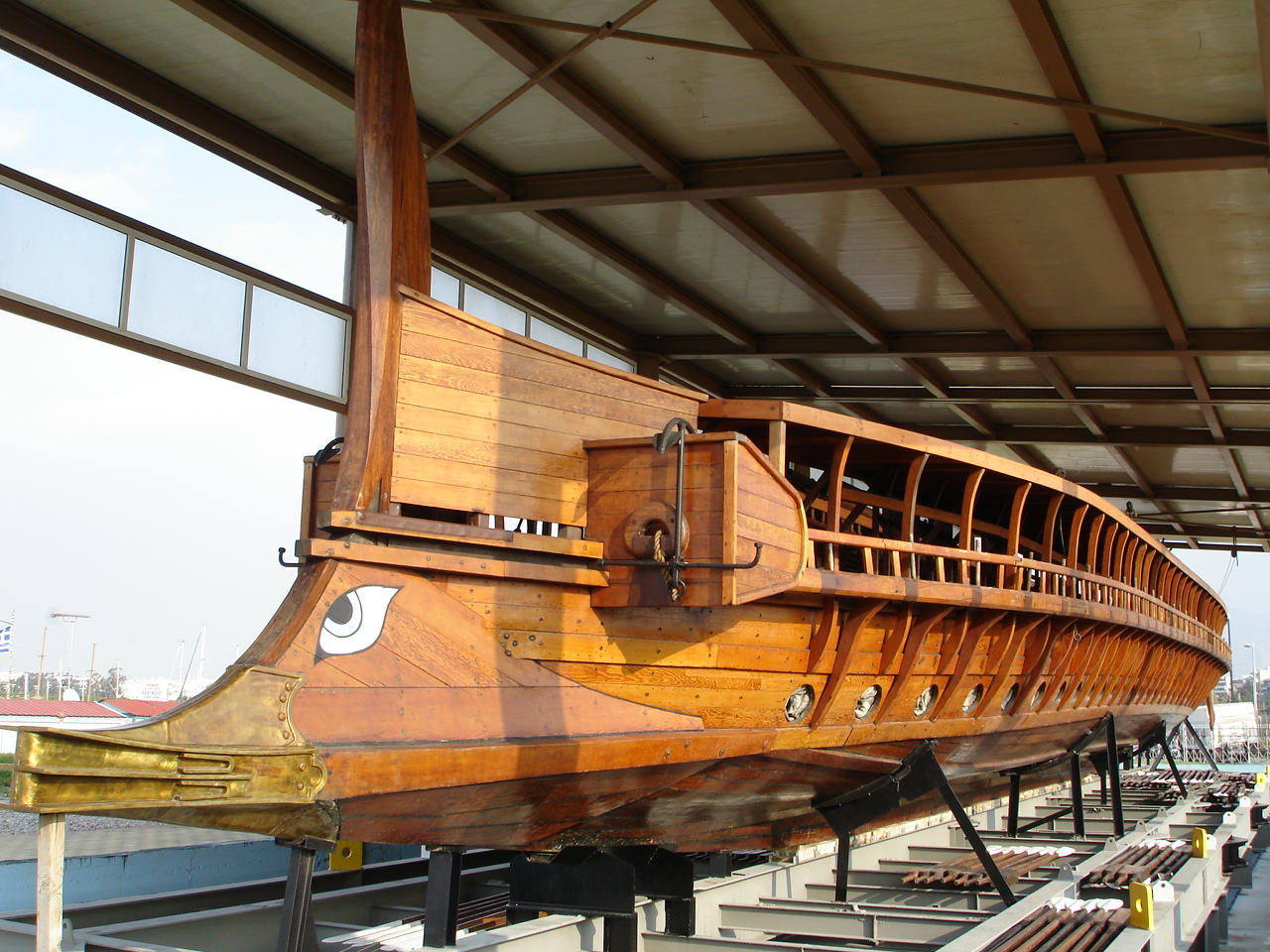
Olympias, a reconstruction of an ancient Athenian trireme, the Athenian fleet would have been supplied with grain from the Makra Stoa

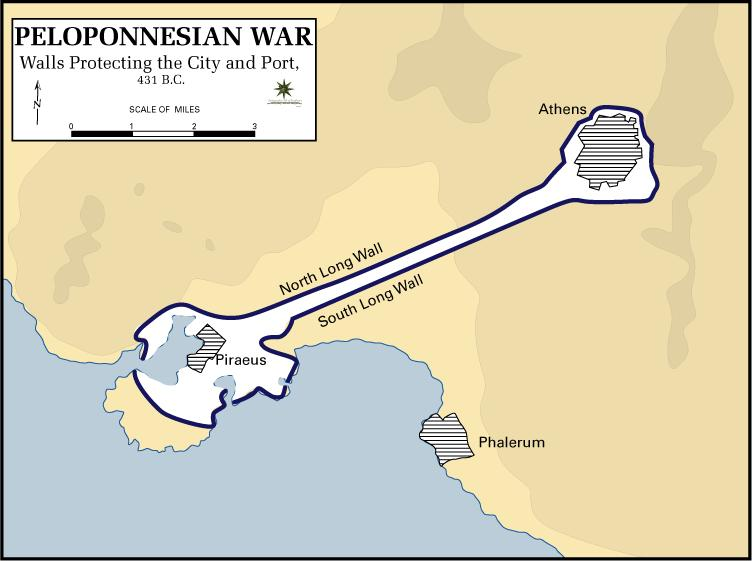
Plan of the city walls of Piraeus into which the Makra Stoa was incorporated and which linked to the Long Walls of Athens

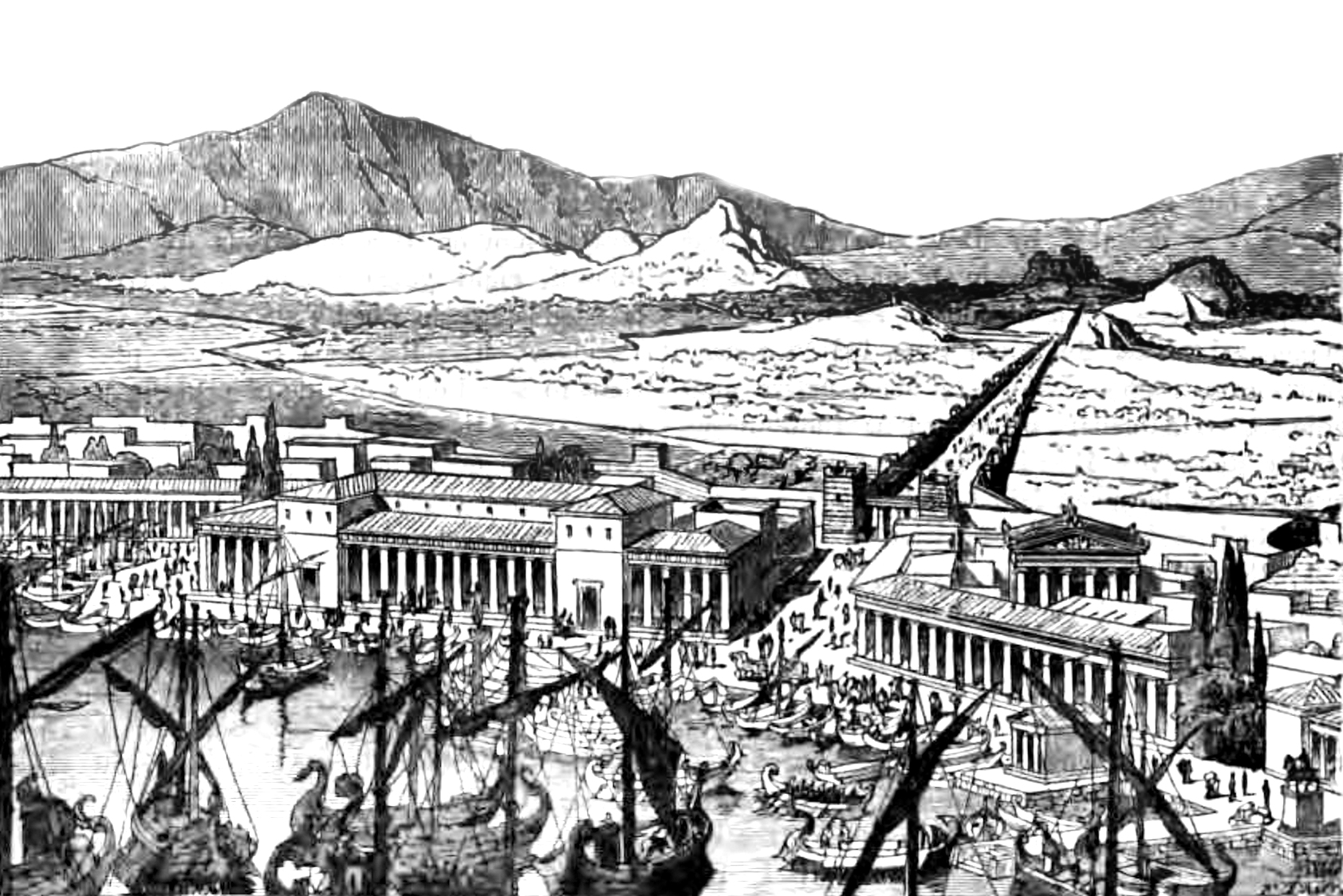
View of Piraeus with colonnaded buildings along the port, including the Makra Stoa
