= Estonian cuisine =

Traditional Estonian cuisine has substantially been based on meat and potatoes, and on fish in coastal and lakeside areas. However, it now shows influences from a variety of international cuisines and ingredients, with a number of contributions from the traditions of nearby countries. German, Swedish, Russian, Finnish and other influences have played their part. The most typical foods in Estonia have been rye bread, barley, pork, fish, potatoes and cow dairy products. In terms of staple food, Estonia is similar to other countries in the Baltic Sea region.

== Cold table ==
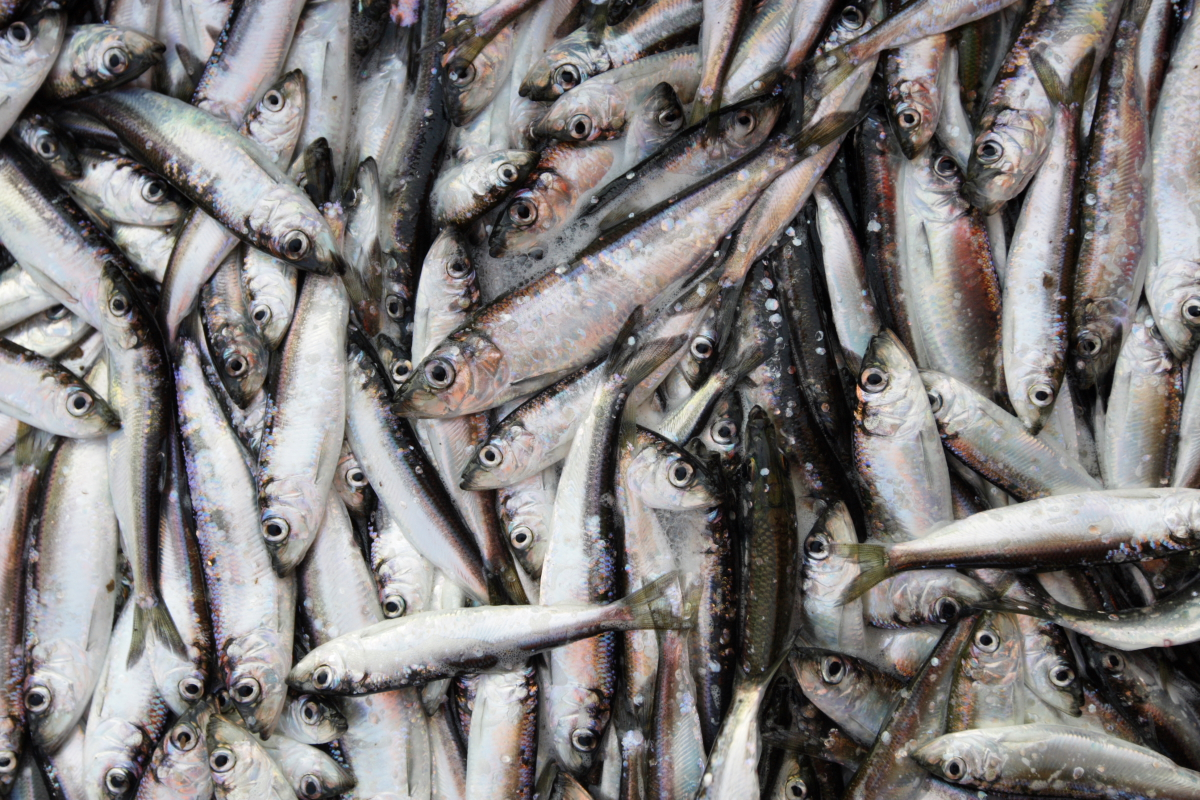
The Baltic herring räim was elected the national fish of Estonia in 2007.

The first course in traditional Estonian cuisine is based on cold dishes — a selection of pickles, meats and sausages (vorst) served with potato salad (kartulisalat), cottage cheese (kodujuust), or rosolje, an Estonian signature dish almost identical to Swedish sillsallad, based on beetroot, potatoes and herring. Pirukad (small salty pastries filled with meat, fish, cabbage, carrots, cheese, or other fillings) are also popular, and are often served with puljong (bouillon broth).

Herring is common among other fish as a part of the Estonian cold table. Smoked or marinated eel, as well as crayfish, are considered delicacies. One of Estonia's national dishes is the diminutive Baltic herring (räim), the national fish of the country, along with the sprat (kilu). Spiced salted sprats with a slice of boiled egg on an open sandwich (kiluvõileib) have been popularised as a distinctivly Estonian appetiser that is a must have during the celebrations of Estonian Independence.

== Soups ==
Soups traditionally formed a main meal option and nowadays are more often eaten as first course. Soups are typically made of meat or chicken stock mixed with a variety of vegetables, peas, eggs, pork or fish. Soups are also blended with sour cream, or milk.

Lõhesupp, a creamy soup which seems to lean more towards local haute cuisine, is made with salmon, potatoes and cream. Hernesupp (pea soup) is also widely eaten. Käkisupp is balls of fried pork with lard, mixed with barley flour, cooked into soup.

Soups are still commonly served and are sold en masse in cans in grocery stores as quick everyday meals.

== Main course ==
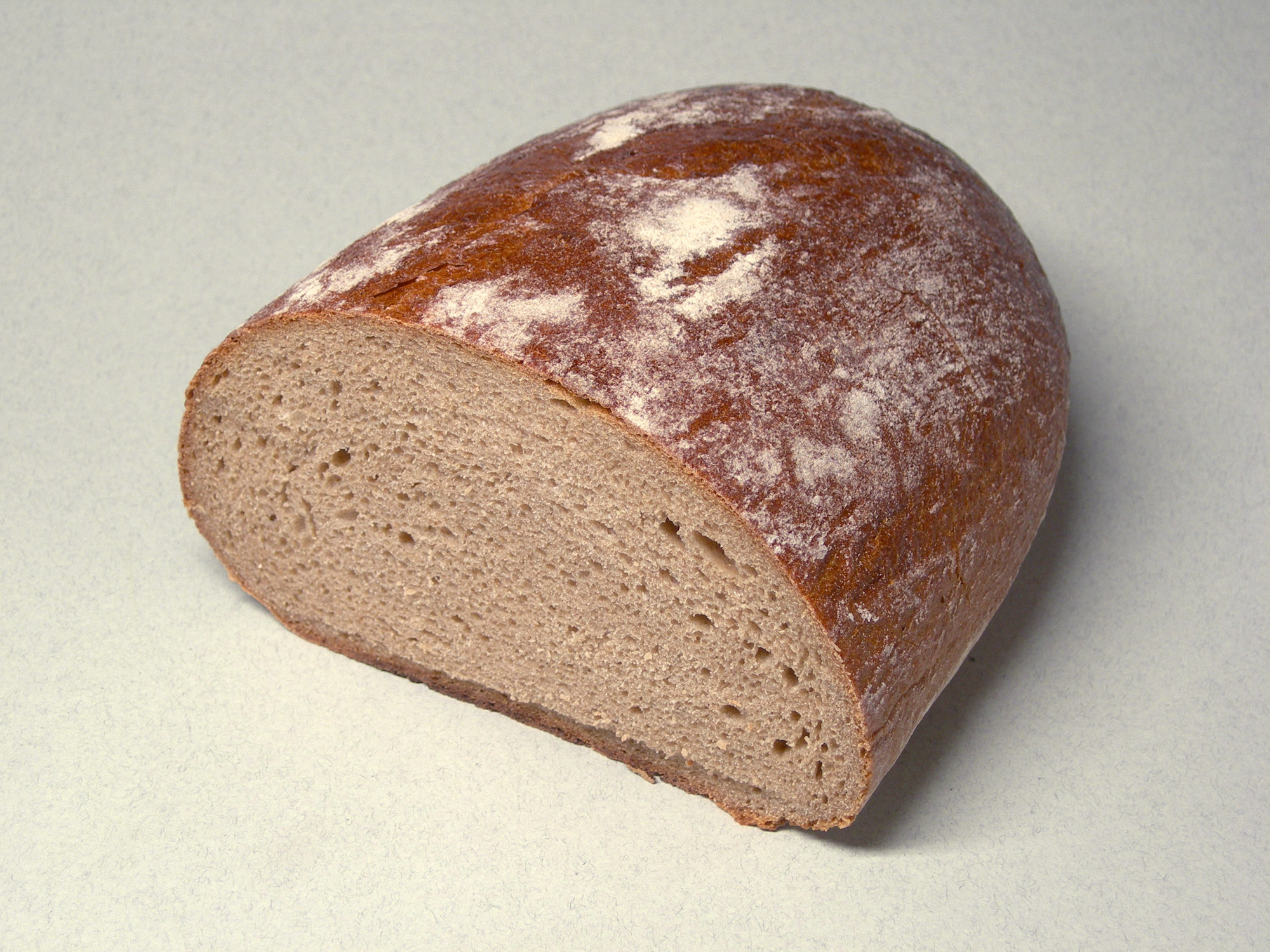
A half-loaf of fine rye bread

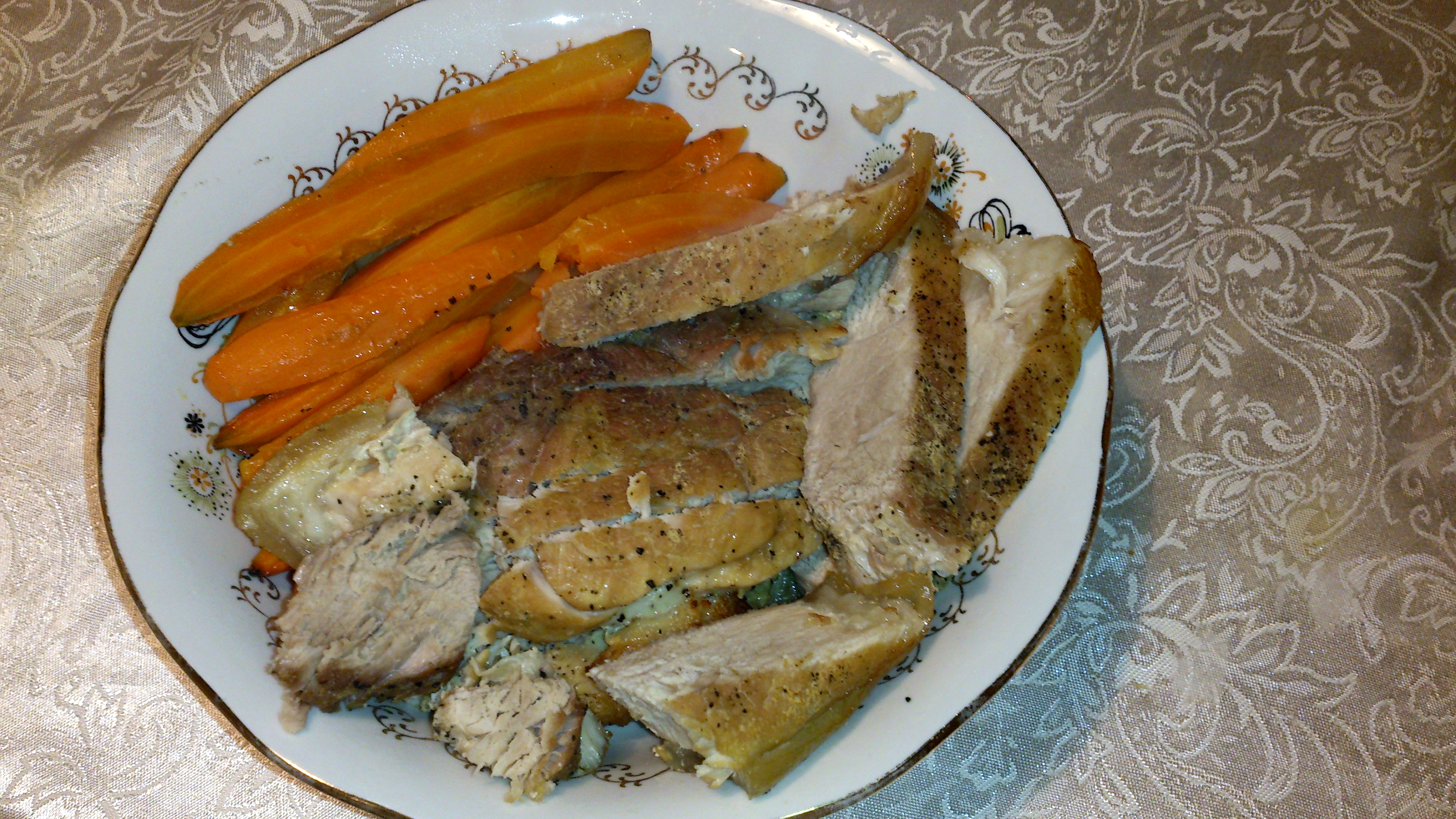
Oven-grilled pork (seapraad) with carrot slices

Black bread (leib, or rukkileib, 'rye bread') typically accompanies the main course, and almost every savory food, in Estonia. Over many generations, Estonians have continued to value the many varieties of black rye-based bread.

Mulgikapsad (sauerkraut with pork and pearl barley) is one food that is added in the list of the Estonian cultural heritage and can be considered to be an Estonian national food.

Mulgipuder is the only Estonian national food that is in the UNESCO List of the Intangible Cultural Heritage of Humanity.

== Desserts ==
Typical Estonian desserts include variants of kohupiim (quark), kohupiimakreem (creamy curd), jogurt (frequently sweetened with sugar and especially with blueberry, or other fruits), jäätis (ice cream), kama (a traditional dish prepared by soaking milled and roasted pea, barley, rye, and oat flour in milk or buttermilk, eaten uncooked), mannavaht (a foamy cream made of semolina and juice or fruit), kompott, and leivasupp lit. 'bread soup', a sweet soup made of rye bread and apples, served with sour cream or whipped cream, almost identical to the Latvian dish maizes zupa.

Pastries or pies like the cinnamon bun, cardamom bun and different curd buns are also eaten, mostly accompanied by coffee. Rhubarb pies are also a favorite. Another popular dessert is kringel (kringle), a sweet yeast bread often flavored with cardamom. Pancakes (pannkook) are also traditional, common and well-liked. Vastlakukkel, a cardamom-spiced bread roll with whipped cream, is a traditional Estonian sweet roll; it is eaten during the festivities of vastlapäev.

Mulgikorp are small round flatbreads or pastries covered with semolina or cottage cheese.

== Drinks ==
Nowadays, locally brewed beer is the number one choice to accompany food; coffee, different juices or simply water are the main non-alcoholic choices. Tea and herbal teas are also drunk. Wine is the second most widely drunk alcoholic beverage; however, the wine consumption volume in Estonia is overshadowed by that of beer — roughly five times more beer alone is being drunk than all the harder alcoholic beverages (including wine and distilled spirits) counted together. There are also Estonian fruit wines made of apples or different berries. Estonia is also known for locally produced viin (vodka) and other kinds of hard liquor.

Mead (mõdu), the alcoholic drink made of honey that was best known in ancient times, has almost completely disappeared. Hapurokk, an ancient drink made of fermented rye, is now produced only on the island of Kihnu.

Some other drinks whose popularity peaked in the 20th century are still consumed by some Estonians, including kali (similar to kvass) and birch sap (kasemahl) beverages.

Besides milk (piim), other widely consumed dairy products include keefir and also hapupiim ("sour milk") and pett, which are variations on the theme of buttermilk.

Yogurt, which was not produced in Estonia before the restoration of independence, has become a common everyday food, which is mostly sold sweetened and in both a liquid form and a creamier version.

== Seasons ==
=== Summer and spring ===
Traditionally in summer and spring, Estonians like to eat everything fresh—berries, herbs, vegetables and everything else that comes straight from the garden. Hunting and fishing were common in history. Nowadays, they have remained as popular pastimes. It is popular to barbecue in the summer. Eggs are painted and eaten during Easter.

=== Winter and Christmas ===
During the winter months, jam, preserves and pickles are brought to the table. In the not-so-distant past, gathering and preserving fruits, edible mushrooms and vegetables for winter was more common than now, when almost everything can simply be bought from stores. However, preparing food for winter is still a common activity in the countryside and continues to retain its charm for many, as an alternative to commercialized contemporary eating habits.

Oven-grilled pork, blood sausage (verivorst), roast goose (jõuluhani), jellied pork (sült), sauerkraut (hapukapsas) with oven-roasted potatoes, and mulled wine (hõõgvein, or glögi) have been part of the traditional Estonian menu that are now mostly Christmas specialties. Typical Christmas treats are still apples, mandarin oranges, gingerbread, pickled pumpkin (kõrvitsasalat), and lingonberry jam.

== History ==
After hunting and fishing, farming (in Estonia, since over 4000 years ago) became another important source of nutrients, especially food made from cereals (e.g., puder (porridge), rokk, leem, etc.) The oldest types of cereal grown in Estonia are barley and wheat. The most important turned out to be dark rye bread made from leavened dough, that started to be baked about a thousand years ago and became synonymous with food in the figurative sense. In addition to bread, a dish made from unleavened barley dough was baked called karask, in later times sepik was also made from wheat flour, and a white wheat bread sai was served on holidays. Turnip was also staple food in Estonia before potato and among other vegetables, cabbage and swede were well known for a long time.

Potato cultivation started in Estonia in the middle of the 18th century, and starting from the end of the 19th century it became a dominant part of the daily Estonian diet. By the first half of the 20th century, Estonia was either the first (or second after Poland) in the world in terms of potato production per capita.

Until the 20th century, meat was not a frequent item on the menu of Estonian commoners. Farmers would slaughter animals in the autumn and the pig's head and legs were cooked into a dish called sült. Silk (Baltic herring) was a fish dish that was eaten salted and appeared much more often on the common people's table. Fresh fish was usually available on the sea coast and by larger lakes. The food selection of the rural population was influenced by the cuisine of the local Baltic German landowners and the wealthier urban class, which was more diverse.

There are still some differences between the cuisines of the two historical regions of Estonia. In Southern Estonia, the farmers grew somewhat more prosperous in the 19th century, and enjoyed a more diverse cuisine compared to Northern Estonia. For example, kama, kohupiim (quark), sõir (a cooked mixture of milk, cottage cheese and eggs) and various dishes made from legumes originate from Southern Estonia.

In the second half of the 19th century, along with urbanisation and rapidly changing economic conditions, eating habits in Estonia turned more complex as new ingredients and innovative food preparation methods became available to the general public. Semolina, rice, sugar, coffee and spices appeared in shops. Along with the evolving international trade, new culinary influences and consumption trends arrived to Estonia: mostly from Germany, and from nearby Saint Petersburg (then capital of the Russian Empire).

In the 1920s and 1930s, a second layer of Estonian cuisine developed in the newly independent country. Since then, such typical dishes in Estonia as the pickled cucumber, pickled pumpkin, liver pâté, cutlets, mashed potatoes, mayonnaise salads, cabbage rolls, kissell, semolina foam, and flat cakes have become well known.

During the period of Soviet occupation (1944-1991), the Estonian daily diet was markedly influenced by what little ingredients were available in, and also what new culinary ideas arrived from, the USSR: borš, seljanka, rassolnik, pelmeenid etc. arrived in canteens and restaurants, whereas šašlõkk appeared in more private events. At the same time, the limited selection of food and especially condiments was felt. Under the Soviet rule, Estonians "invented" several desserts that would most commonly be eaten during birthdays, e.g kirju koer (cocoa powder and butter mixed with crumbled cookies and marmalade, put in the freezer overnight) and kass Artur (soft toffee and butter mixed with fluffy corn sticks, frozen overnight).

Since the country regained independence in 1991, modern Estonian cuisine has been influenced by globalization: pizza, pasta, hamburgers, french fries etc. are nowadays as common as rye bread, pork, boiled potatoes and herring as staple foods. In the 21st century, it has been argued that the traditional Estonian cuisine has less importance. However, during the most important holidays and celebrations, and also every day, traditional foods are still preferred in families and among friends.

== Gallery ==
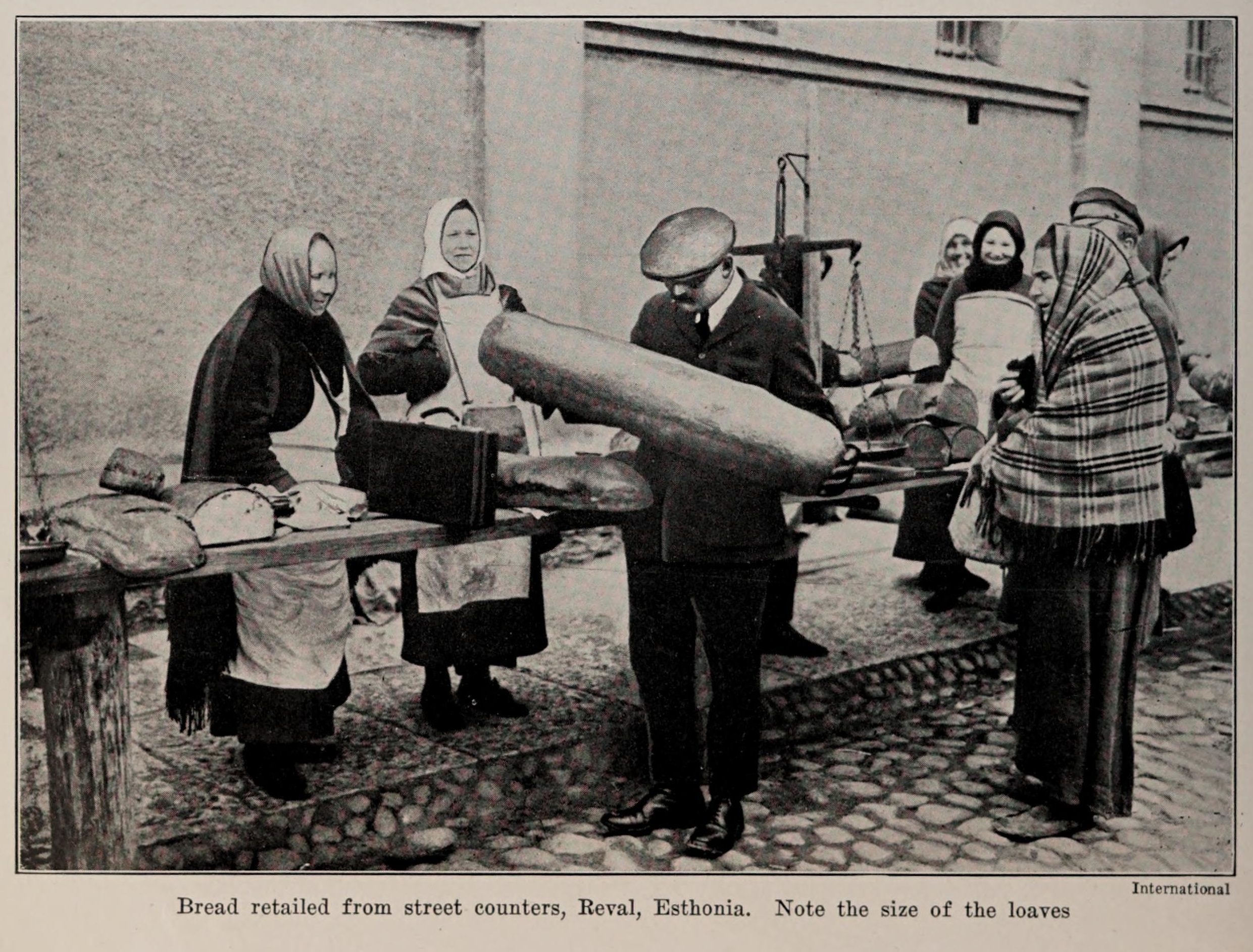
Bread retailed from street counters in Tallinn (photo from The Encyclopedia of Food by Artemas Ward, 1923).

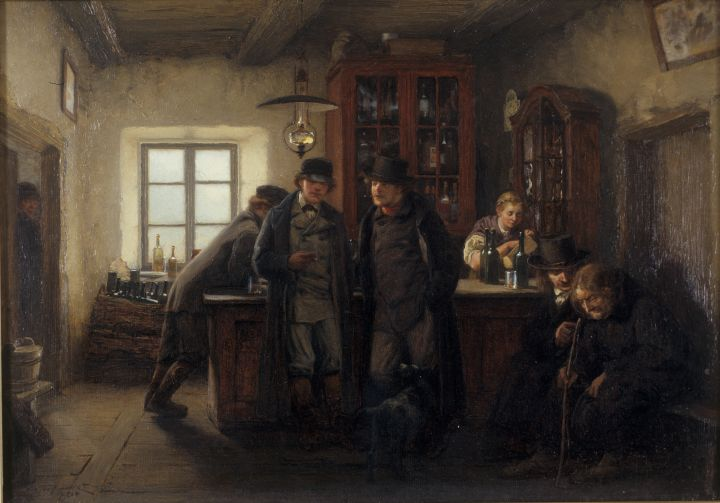
Estonian farmers in an inn, drinking viin (vodka), painting by Oskar Hoffmann, 1899.

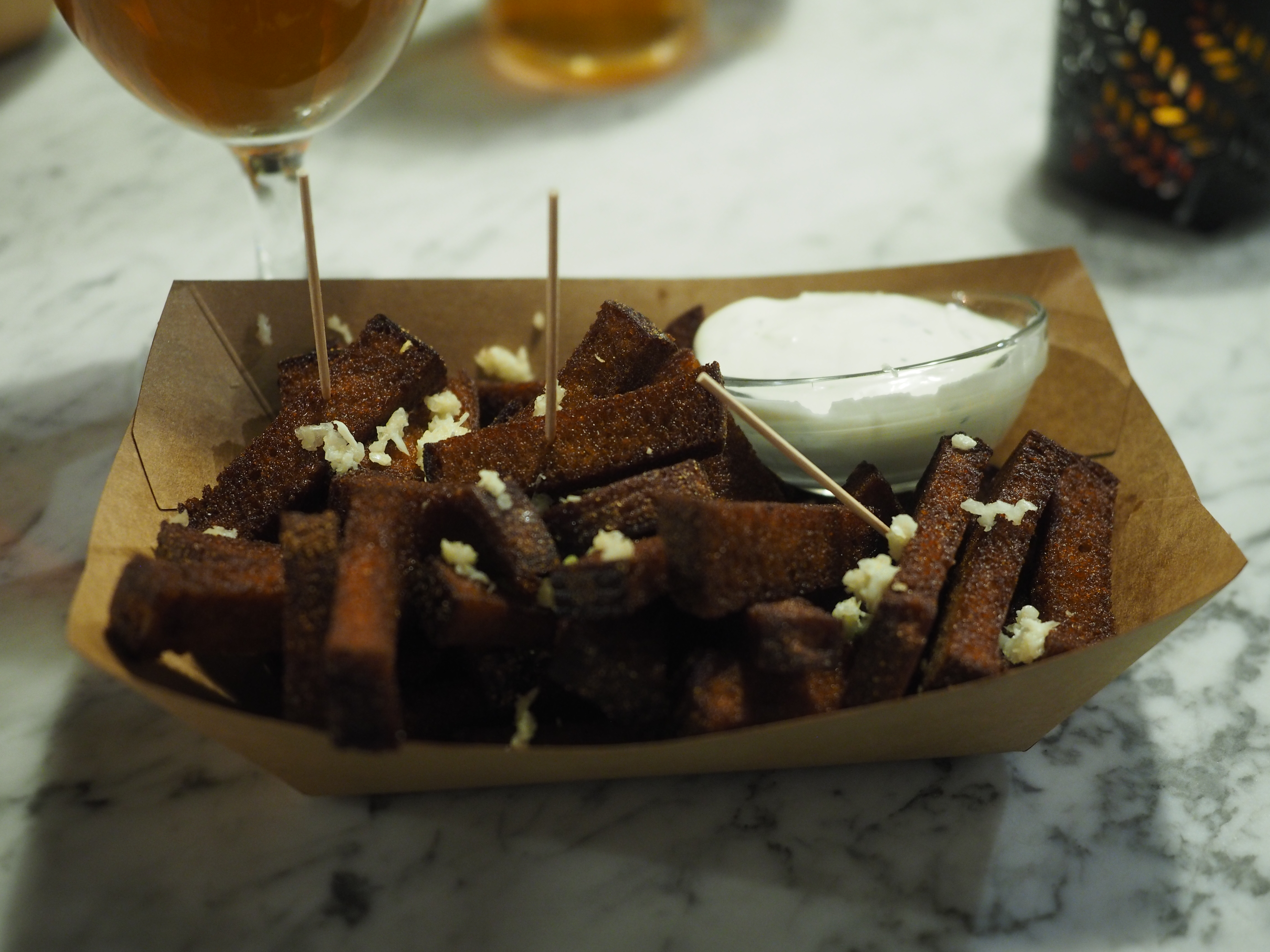
Rye bread (leib) with garlic is also eaten as a pub snack.

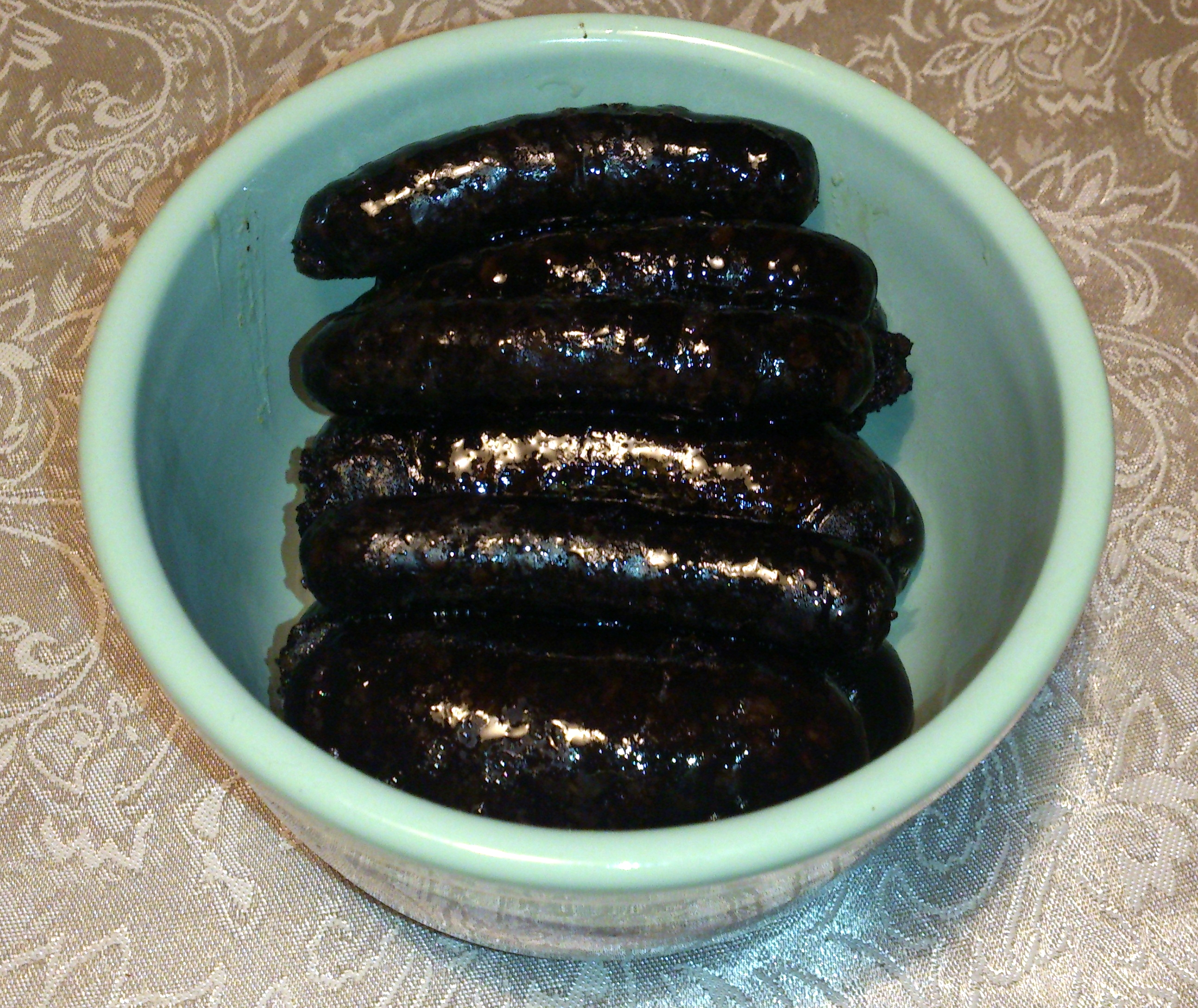
Small oven-cooked verivorst blood sausages

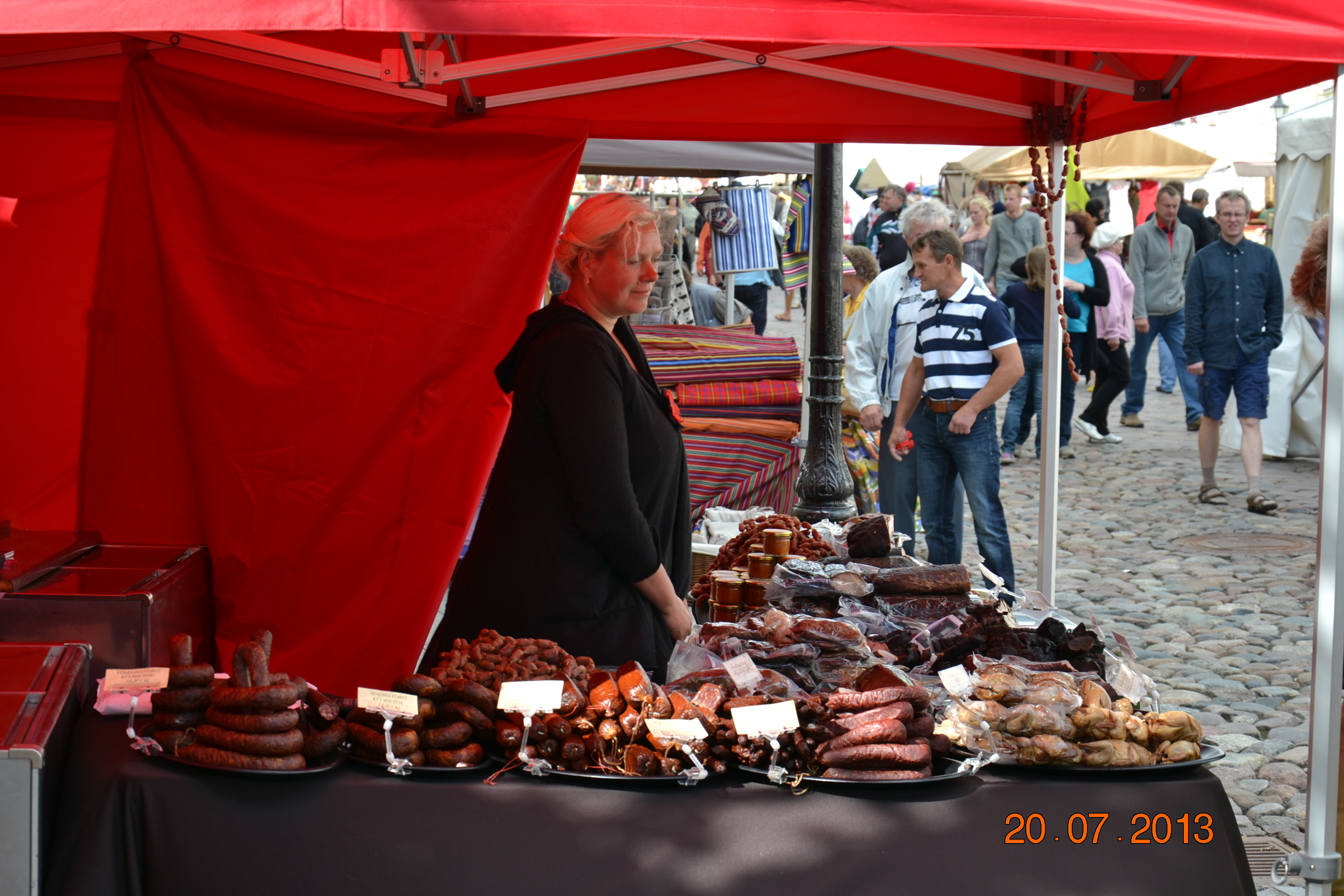
Traditional sausages at display in an Estonian street market, 2013.

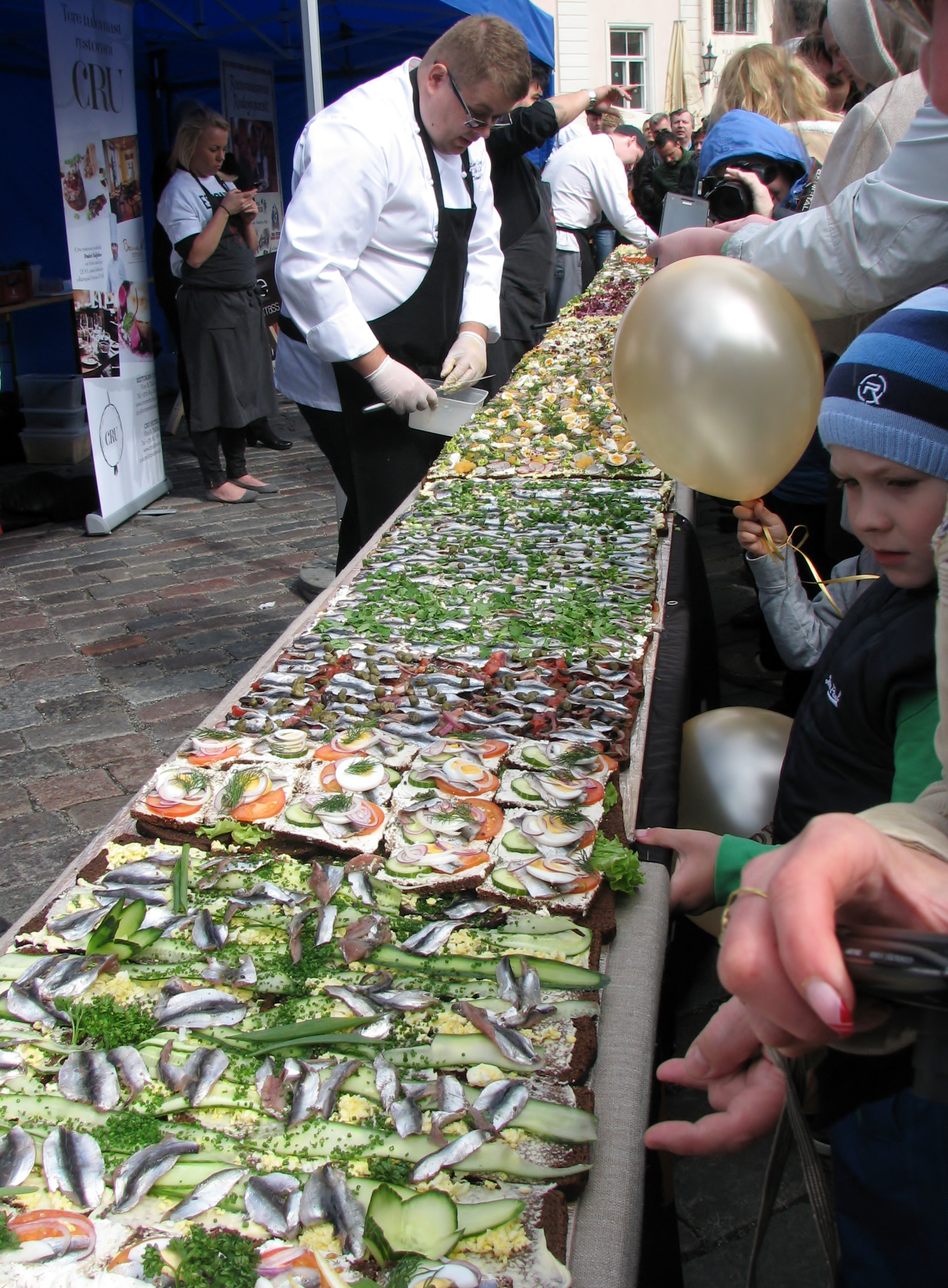
World's largest kiluvõileib fish sandwich was created in 2014 in Tallinn.

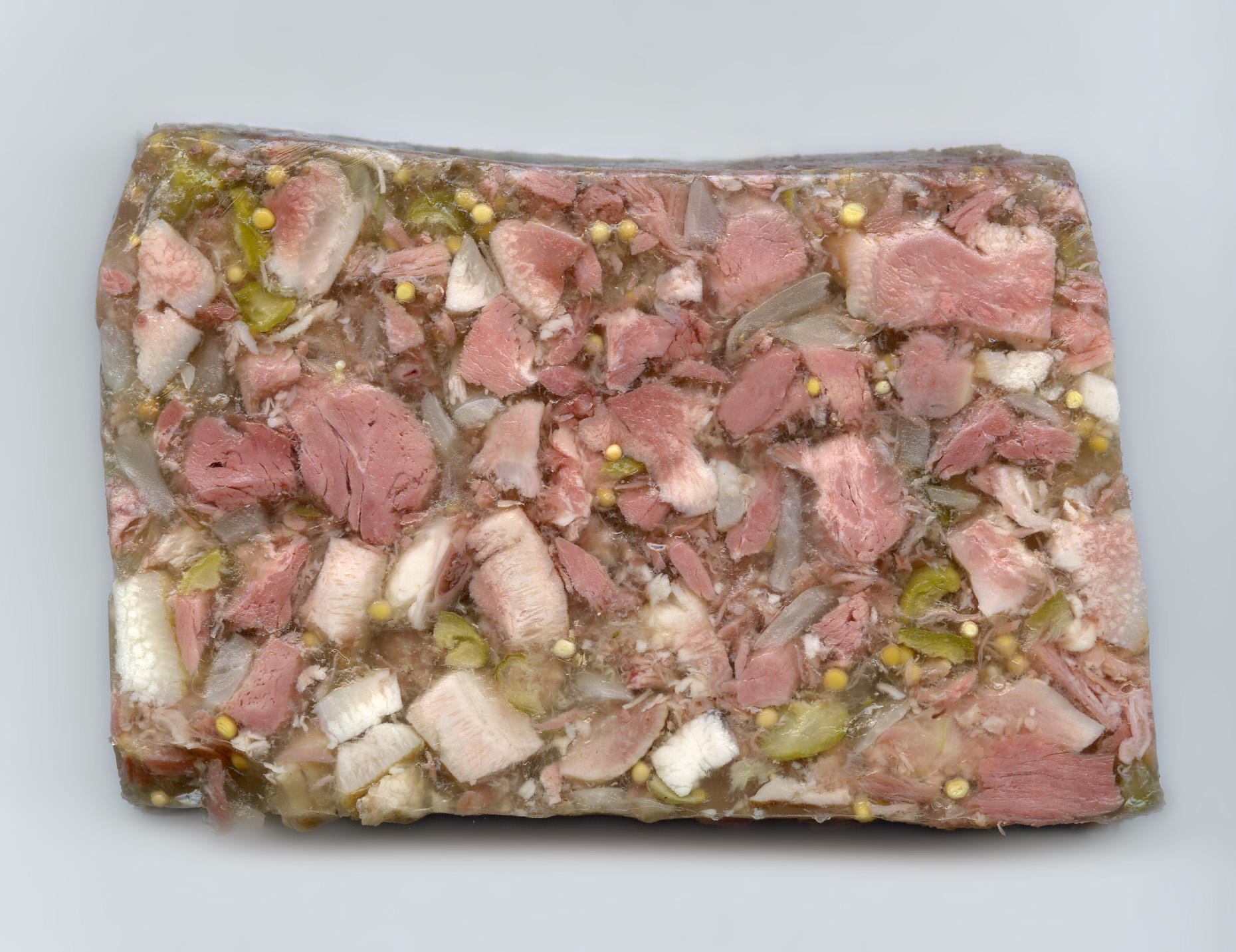
Sült (pieces of meat in jellied pork brawn).

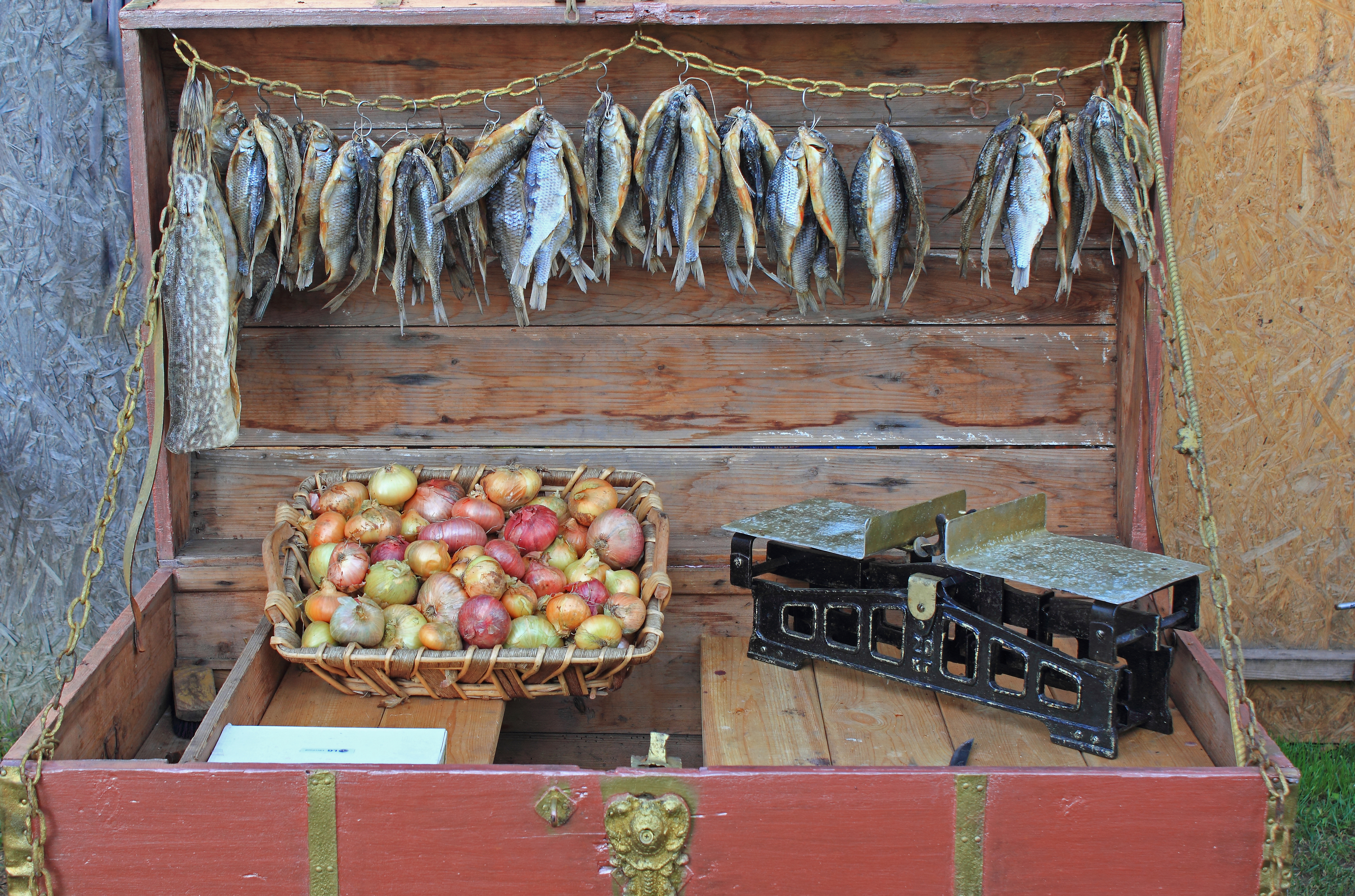
Onions and dried fish for sale on a farmer's roadside stand.

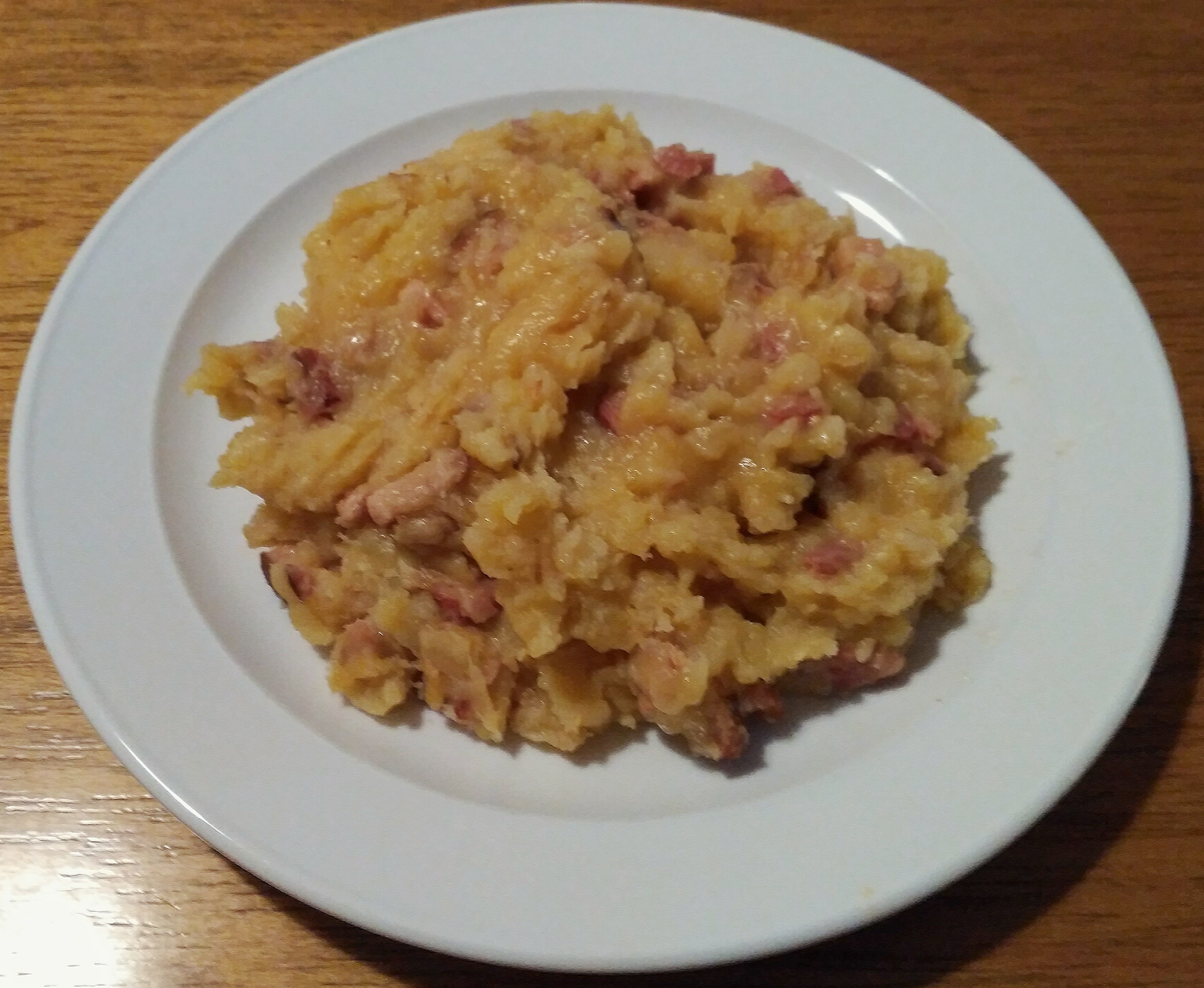
Mulgipuder, a traditional dish of potatoes, groats and pork, originating from south Estonia

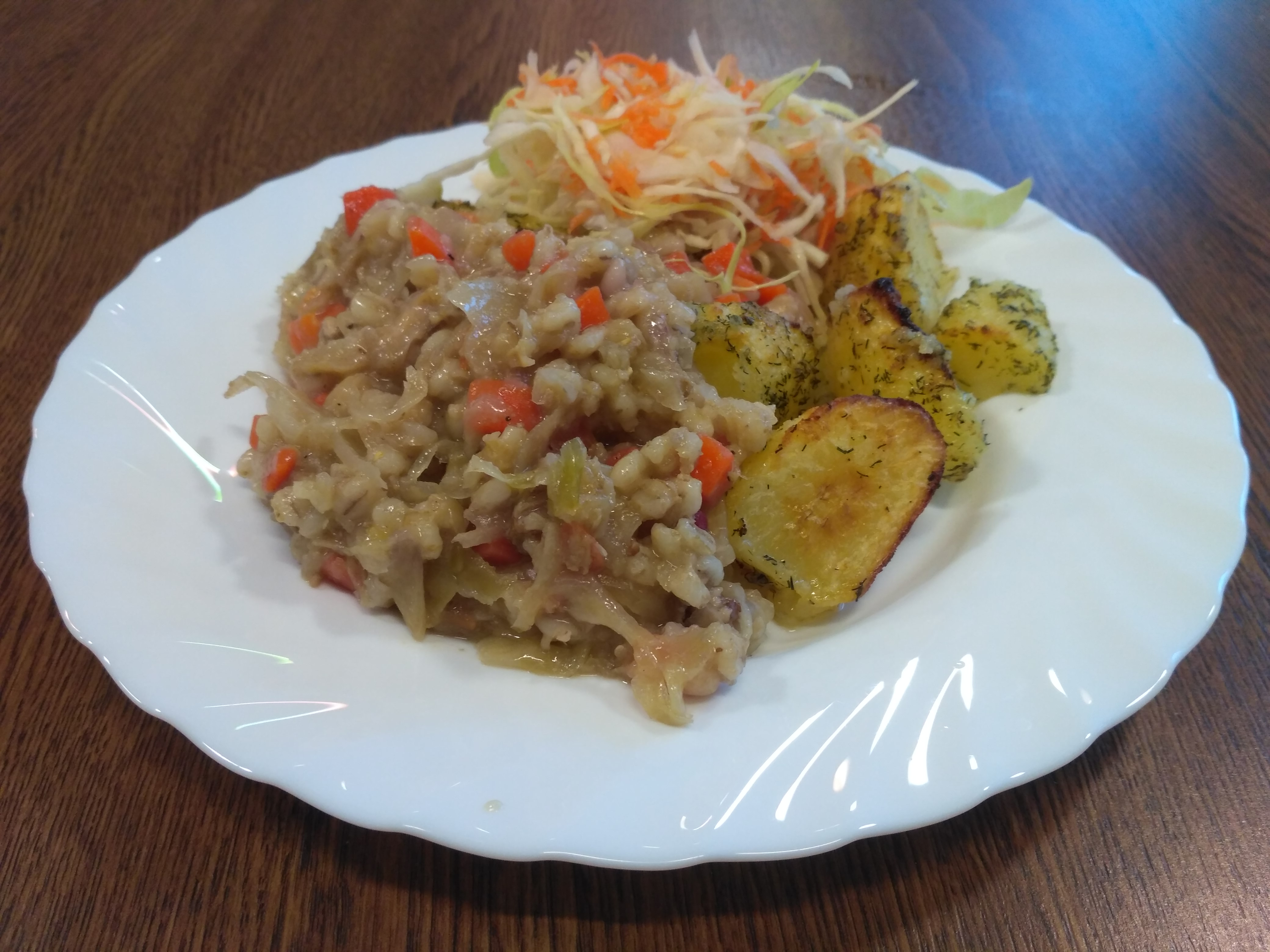
Mulgikapsad (sauerkraut with pork and pearl barley) served with baked potatoes

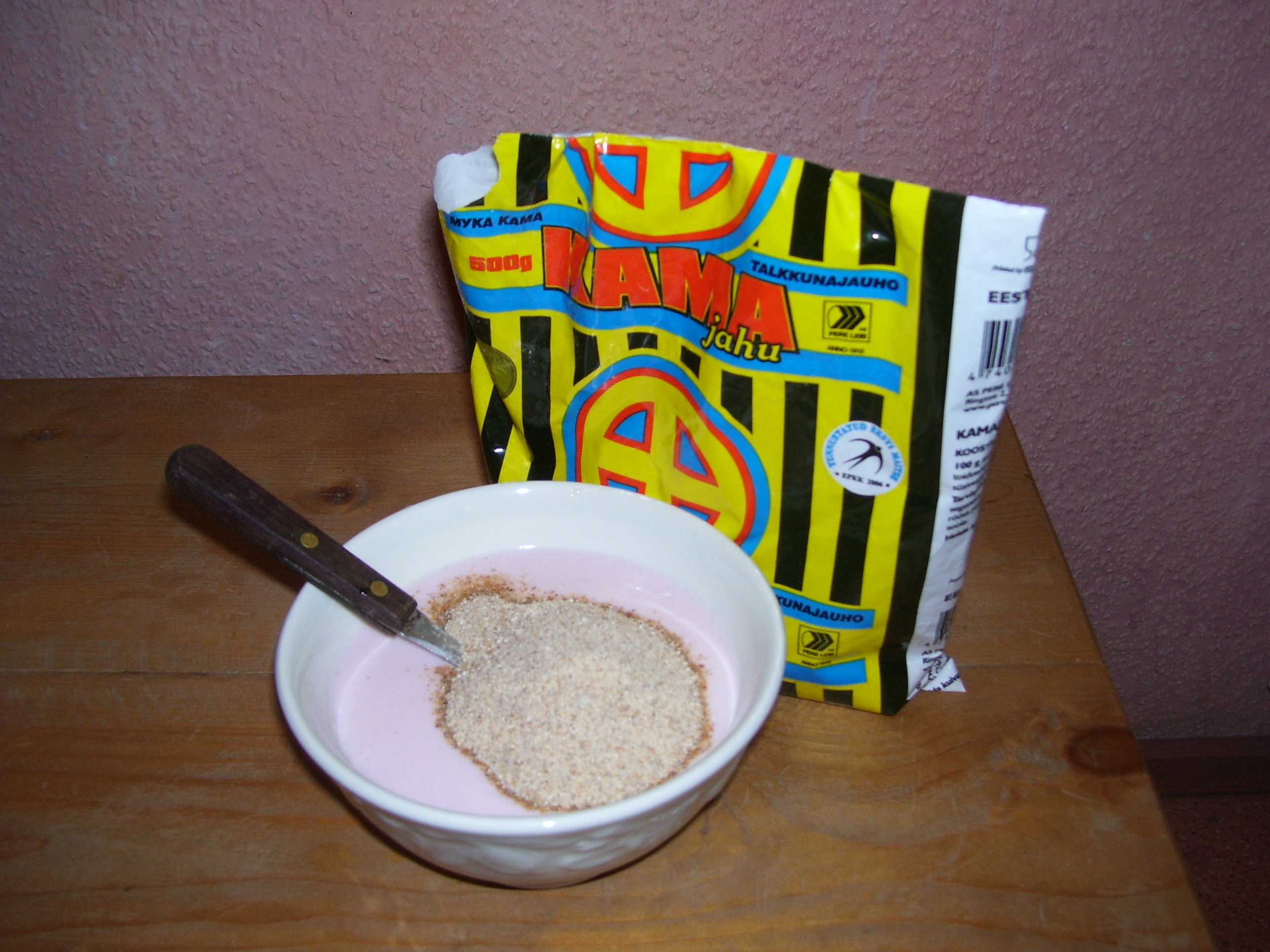
The making of kama, a traditional dish prepared by soaking and mixing a combination of milled and roasted cereal and legume flours (kamajahu) in milk or buttermilk and eaten uncooked.
