= Mulgikapsad =

Cabbage-based dish in Estonian cuisine

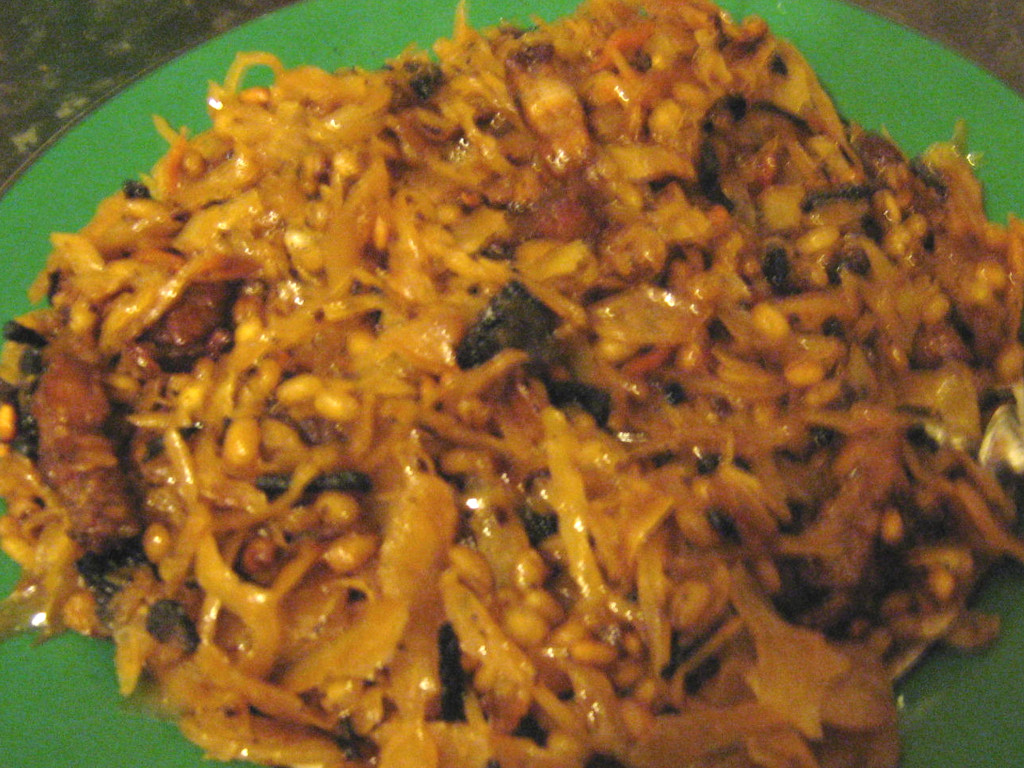
Mulgikapsad

Mulgikapsad (also Mulgi kapsad) is sauerkraut stewed with lard, meat (mostly pork) and pearl barley. It is in the list of the Estonian cultural heritage, and can be considered to be an Estonian national food.

What makes this food unique to Estonia is pearl barley, added not because of taste, but to inexpensively add nutritional benefit and change the visual appearance of the food.

== See also ==
- Estonian cuisine
- Mulgimaa, a cultural–historical region in South Estonia
- Mulgipuder
