= Tsampa =

Roasted flour for cereal

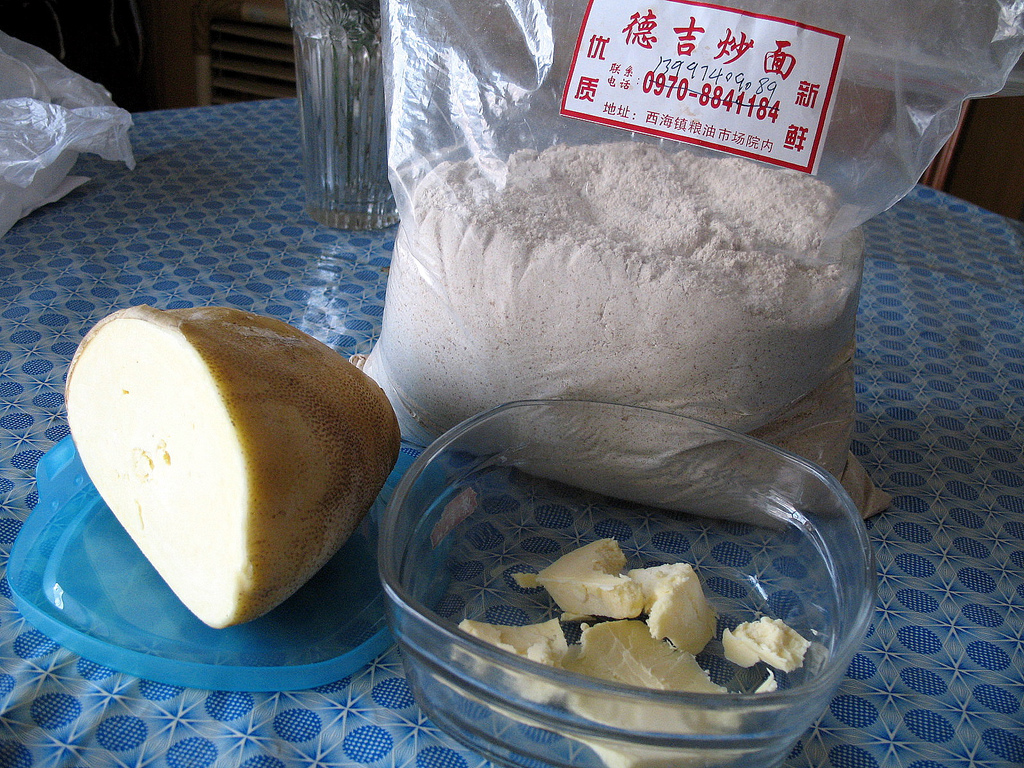
- Alternative names: Zamba
- Type: Porridge
- Place of origin: Tibet, Mongolia
- Main ingredients: Flour (usually barley)

Tsampa or tsamba (Tibetan: རྩམ་པ་, Wylie: rtsam pa; Chinese: 糌粑; pinyin: zānbā) is a Tibetan and Himalayan staple foodstuff; it is also prominent in parts of northern Nepal. It is a glutinous meal made from roasted flour, usually barley flour and sometimes also wheat flour and flour prepared from tree peony seeds. It is usually mixed with Tibetan butter tea. It is also eaten in Turkestan and Mongolia, where it is known as zamba.

== Preparation ==
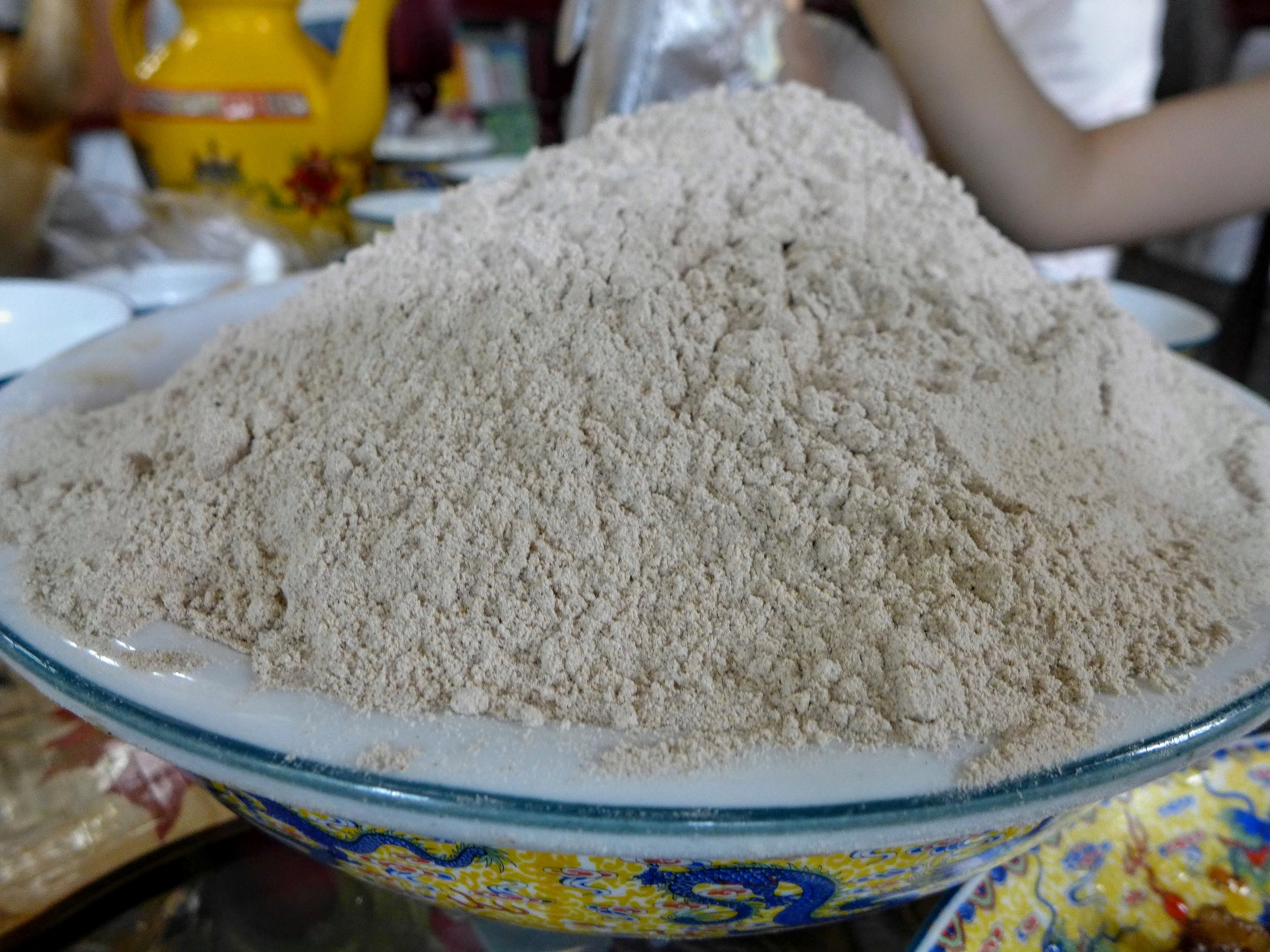
A bowl of unprepared tsampa, served on the table of a Tibetan restaurant in Chengdu, China.

As the flour has already been roasted, tsampa is simple to prepare and does not need to be cooked; indeed, it is known as a convenience food and often used by Tibetans, Sherpas, nomads and other travellers. While traditional tsampa is prepared with tea, sometimes water or beer is used in its place. It may also be prepared as a porridge called a "jham-thoo", which is usually sweet and nutty and prepared with Tibetan cheese, butter, tea and sugar. Tsampa is also prepared in a congee with lamb or yak stock to make a congee which is called "tsam-thug". André Migot described its preparation:

You leave a little buttered tea in the bottom of your bowl and put a big dollop of tsampa on top of it. You stir gently with the forefinger, then knead with the hand, meanwhile twisting your bowl round and round until you finish up with a large dumpling-like object which you proceed to ingest, washing it down with more tea. The whole operation demands a high degree of manual dexterity, and you need a certain amount of practical experience before you can judge correctly how much tsampa goes with how much tea. Until you get these proportions right the end product is apt to turn into either a lump of desiccated dough or else a semi-liquid paste which sticks to your fingers. Sometimes you lace this preparation with a form of powdered milk, made from curds which have been dried in the sun.

== Cultural significance ==
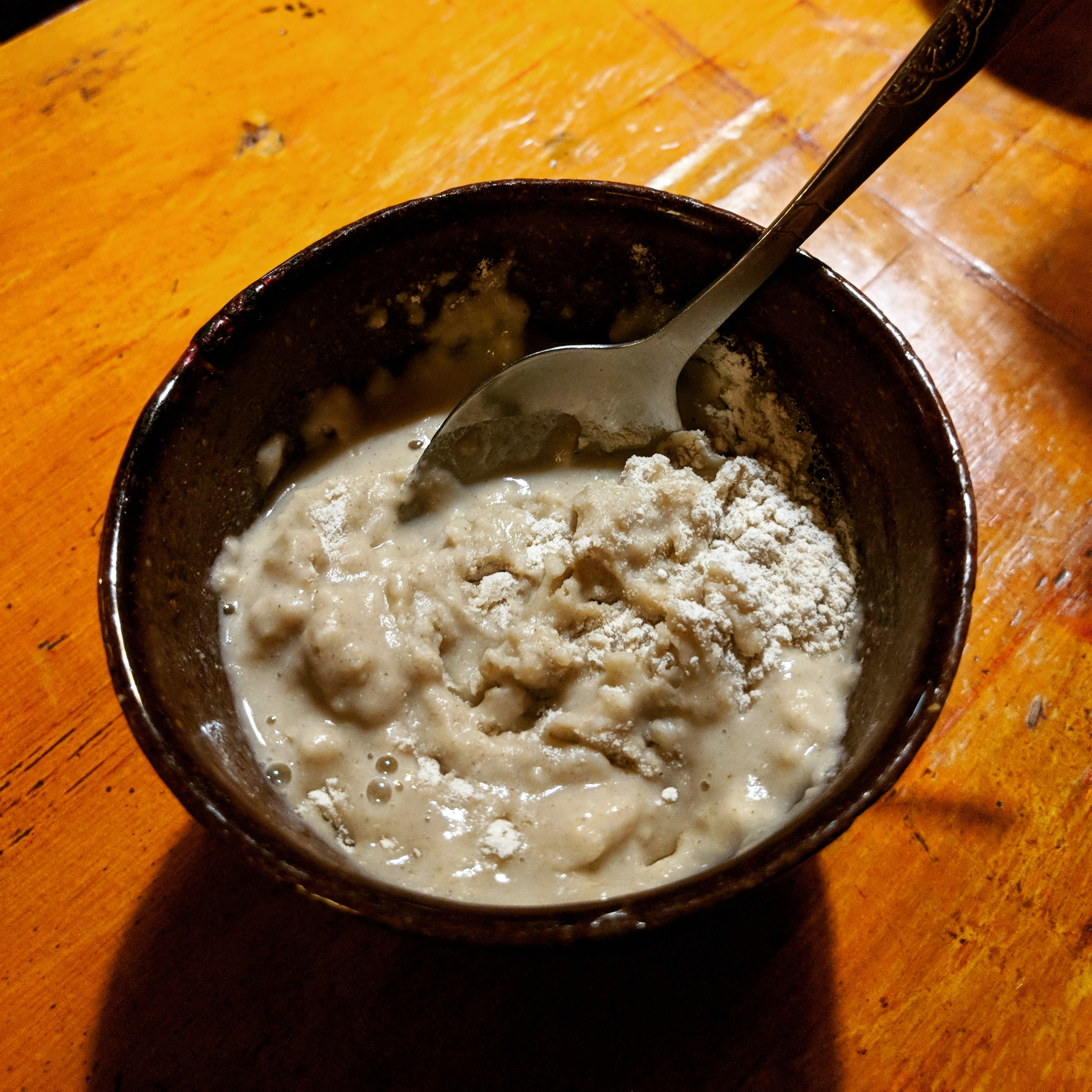
A bowl of tsampa in the process of having butter tea blended in to produce tsampa dumplings or porridge.

Besides constituting a substantial, arguably predominant part of the Tibetan diet, its prominence also derives from the tradition of throwing pinches of tsampa in the air during many Buddhist rituals. It is believed that tsampa-throwing actually predates Buddhist beliefs in the area and was originally used as an offering to animistic gods to request their protection. The tradition was consequently incorporated into Buddhism as a "mark of joy and celebration" used at celebratory occasions such as marriages and birthdays. Today it is particularly known in that regard for its use in New Year celebrations, where it is accompanied by chanted verses expressing the desire for good luck in the forthcoming year, for both oneself and others. Tsampa-throwing also occurs at most Buddhist funerals, where the action is intended to release the soul of the deceased.

Tsampa is used in a number of other ways. Mashes of tsampa and cumin are sometimes applied to toothaches or other sore spots. Tsampa is also known among Tibetan sportsmen for its ability to provide rapid energy boosts; the roasting of the flour breaks it down to an easily digestible state, allowing the calories therein to be quickly incorporated into the body.

Reflecting its foundational role in Tibetan culture, "Tsampa" is also the name of a Tibetan typeface.

== Political significance ==
The phrase "tsampa-eater" was used to promote a unified Tibetan identity. Whereas Tibetans speak various dialects, worship in different sects, and live in different regions, all Tibetans were thought to eat tsampa. In 1957, the India-based Tibet Mirror addressed a letter to "all tsampa-eaters", encouraging them to participate in what would become the 1959 Tibetan Rebellion. Recently, with the rise of the Tibetan diaspora, less emphasis has been placed on tsampa and more emphasis on Tibetan Buddhism in constructing a unified Tibetan identity.

== See also ==
- Brenntar – Traditional Swabian staple foodstuff similar to tsampa.
- Talkkuna – Traditional Finnish, Estonian and Russian staple foodstuff similar to tsampa.
- Brose
- Chatang
- Gundain
- Gyabrag
- Gofio
- Hardtack
- Kama (food)
- Misutgaru
- Parched grain
- Sattu
- Tibetan cuisine
- List of porridges
- List of Tibetan dishes
