= Mustikkapöperö =

Finnish traditional food

- Alternative names: Pöperö, pöpörö, pöppi or pöllöhillo
- Place of origin: Finland
- Main ingredients: Blueberries and talkkuna

Mustikkapöperö (also known as pöperö, pöpörö, pöppi or pöllöhillo) is a traditional Finnish dish. It is made by mixing crushed blueberries and finely milled flour mixture (Talkkuna). Talkkuna is only used to add flavour, however it will become bitter if too much is added. Some people also add sugar to mustikkapöperö, and in newer recipes, whipped cream or buttermilk can be added for example on top of or mixed in with the berries.

To make authentic mustikkapöperö, you can only use talkkuna that is made from toasted oats. Pöperö is usually eaten when you have fresh blueberries. Pöperö has traditionally been made from lingonberries, and some people add currants if there are not enough blueberries.

This dish is mainly known in the province of Häme. The origins of the name are unclear. Mustikkapöperö is not made commercially, because it is a dish that is only made fresh at the time of consumption, and doesn't keep well.

In literature, pöllöhillo appears in Helena Meripaasi's novel of the same name published in 2007. In the book however it is merely mentioned once in connection to tradition.

== Gallery ==
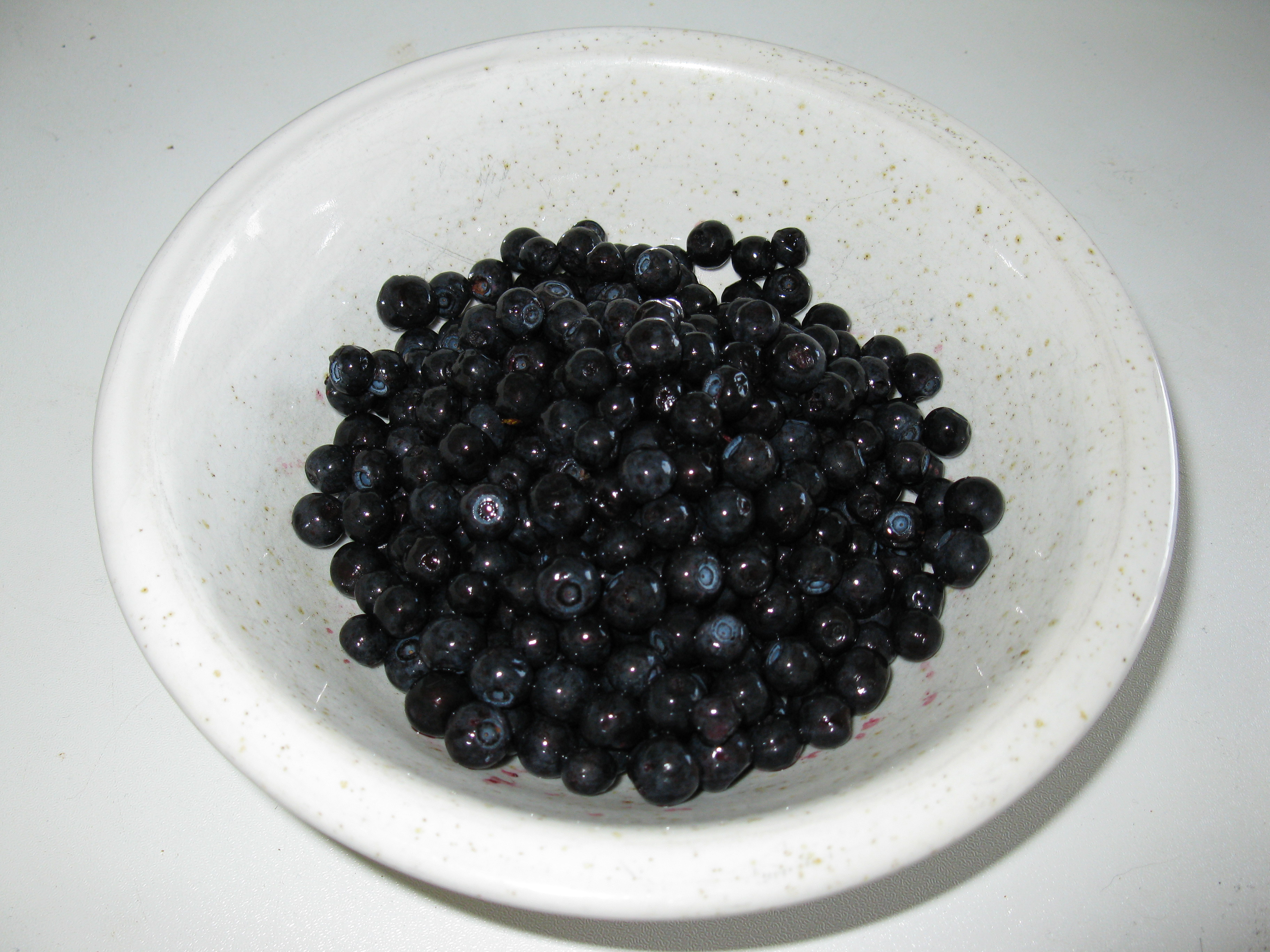
Fresh blueberries on a plate

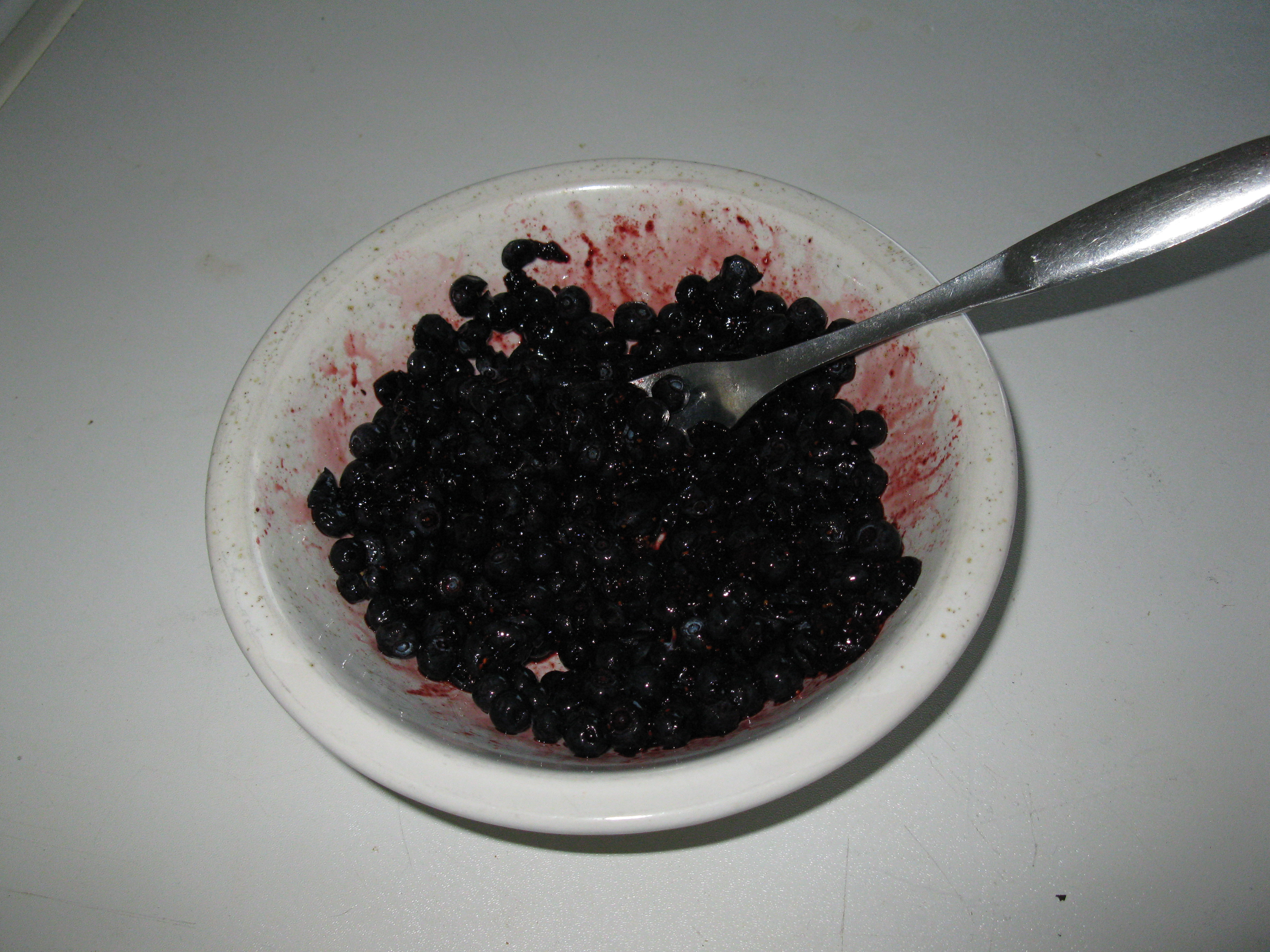
Blueberries being crushed

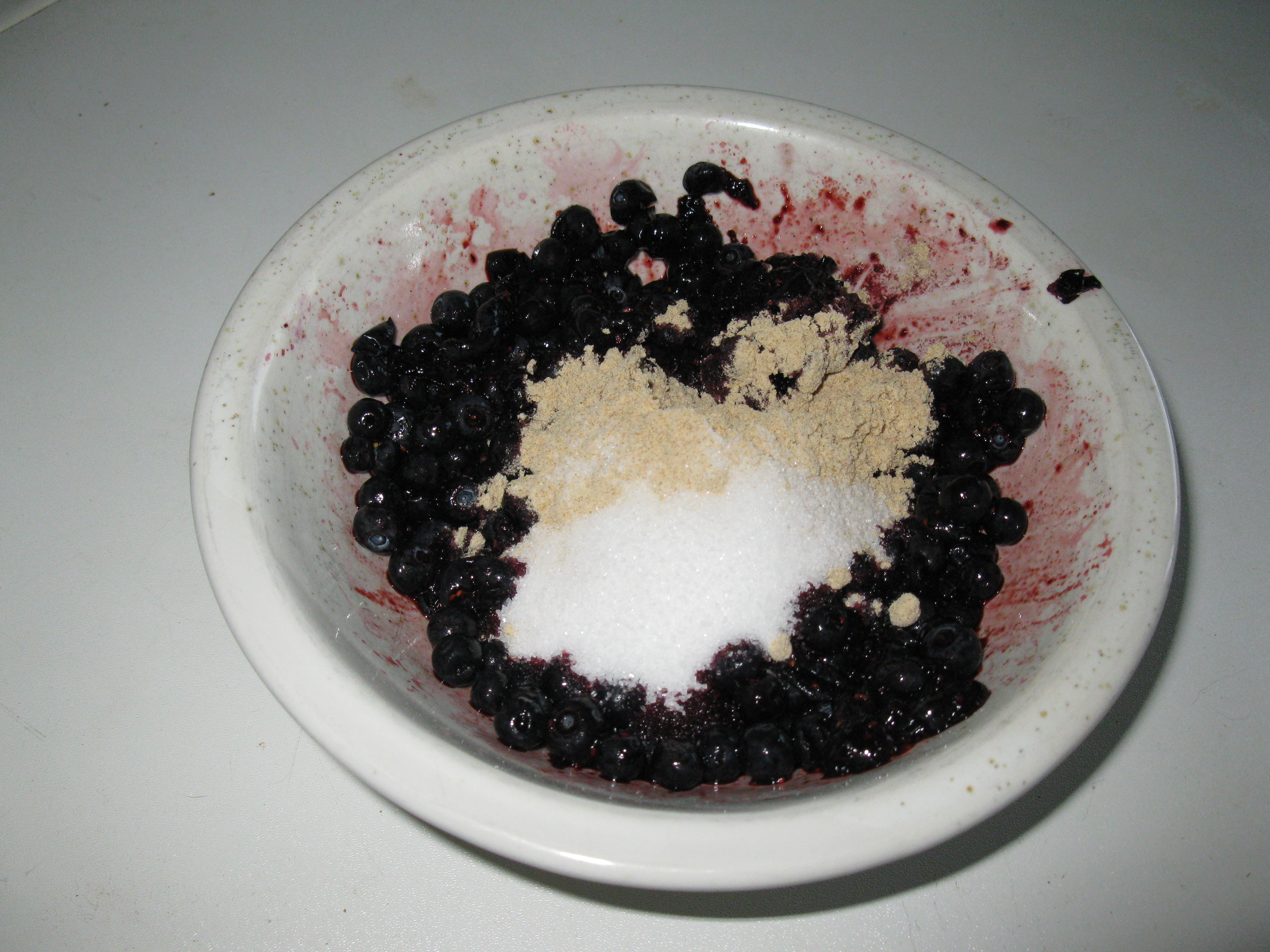
Talkkuna and sugar being added for taste

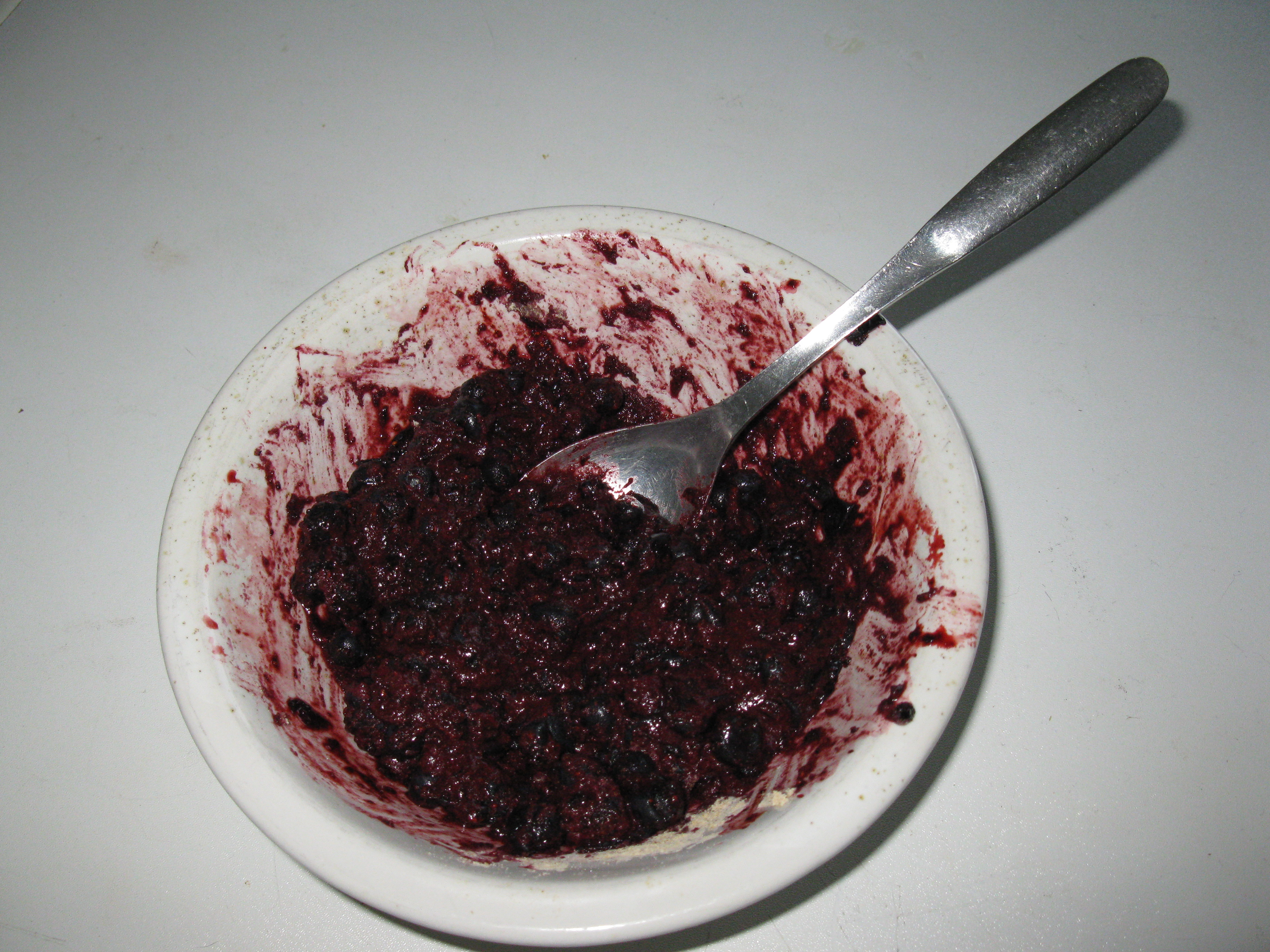
Mixing the ingredients
