= Gundain =

Tibetan pastry

- Type: Pastry
- Place of origin: Tibet
- Main ingredients: Barley grain, yeast, tsampa, dry curd cheese, wild ginseng and brown sugar

In Tibetan cuisine, gundain is a type of pastry made from barley grain and yeast (fermented into a light barley beer), with tsampa, dry curd cheese, wild ginseng, and brown sugar. This pastry is often served during the Tibetan New Year and Losar as a starter.

== See also ==
- List of Tibetan dishes
