= Gyabrag =

Pancake in Tibetan cuisine

- Type: Pancake
- Place of origin: Tibet
- Main ingredients: Barley flour, yak butter, cheese curds, sugar

In Tibetan cuisine, gyabrag is a pancake, made with barley flour, yak butter, dry cheese curds and sugar.

== See also ==
- List of pancakes
- List of Tibetan dishes
