= Kama (food) =

Traditional Finnic dish of mixed cereal flour and milk

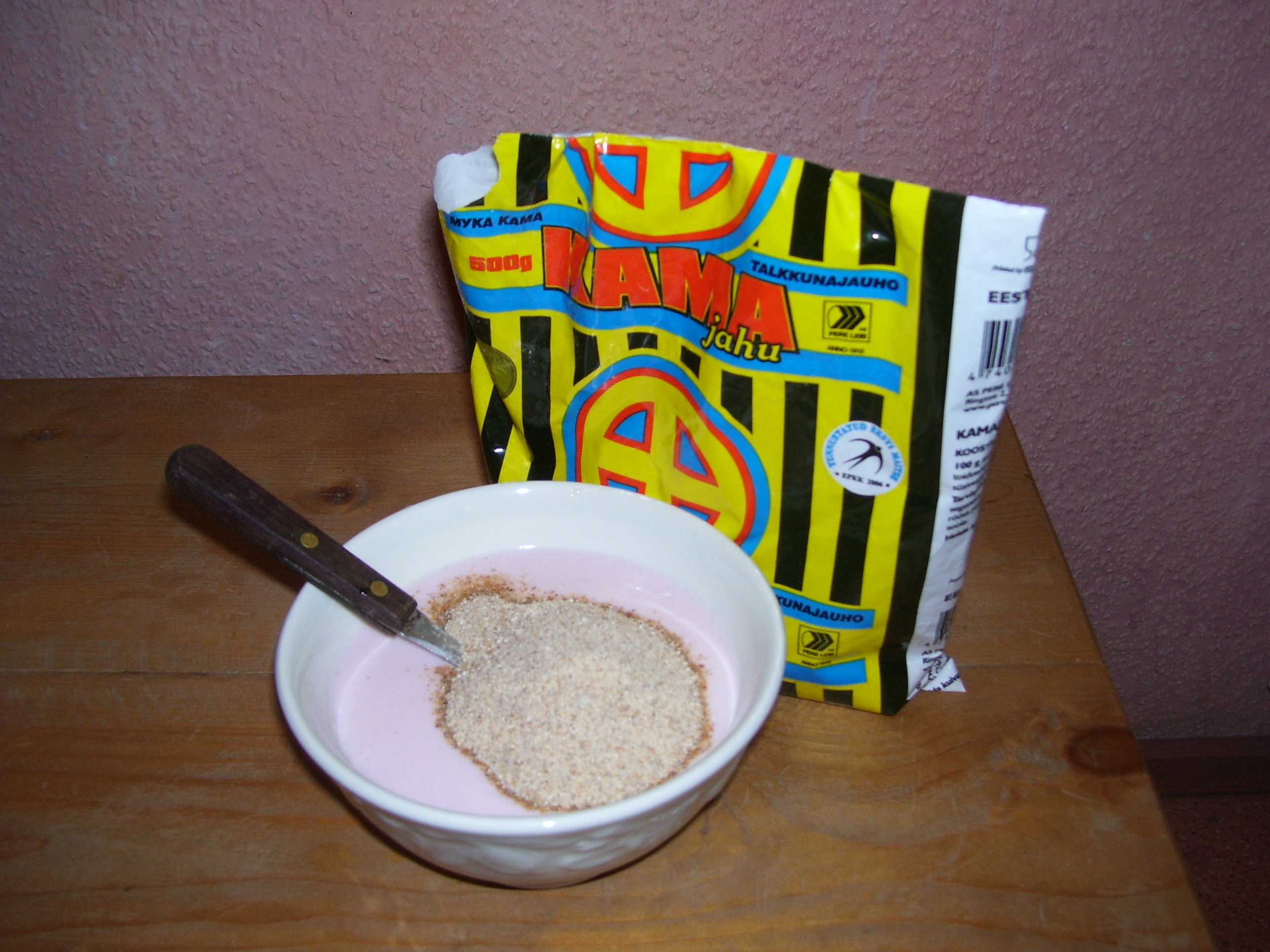
A bowl of kama in preparation (before mixing)

Kama (from Estonian) is a dish from the Baltic region, most commonly eaten in Estonia and Finland (where it is called talkkuna), based on milled cereals and legumes, traditionally prepared and eaten uncooked as fast food by combining the fine flour mixture with just cow milk or buttermilk. The main ingredient of kama is the "kama flour" (kamajahu) which nowadays typically contains a mixture of roasted barley, rye, oat and pea flour.

Historically, kama was a farmer dish; it originated from southern Estonia, and it was made slightly differently in each geographic area; it could consist of oats, peas, beans or wheat, which were mixed together depending on the region. The oat flour may be completely replaced by wheat flour, or kibbled black beans may be added to the mixture. In Finland, talkkunajauho is made by first steaming grains, then grinding them up and finally roasting them.

The kamajahu flour mixture was a non-perishable, easy-to-carry "food that could be quickly fashioned into a stomach-filling snack by rolling it into butter or lard"; it did not require baking, as it was already roasted. Nowadays, Estonians kama remains popular and many Estonians consider it a distinctive "national food".

In Finland, talkkuna is nowadays also used for making some desserts, and it is mostly eaten for breakfast mixed with milk, buttermilk or kefir as mush. It is frequently sweetened with sugar and especially with blueberry to make mustikkapöperö. More rarely talkkuna is sweetened with other fruits or honey or served unsweetened. It is also used for milk or sour desserts, together with the forest berries typical of Finland.

== Similar flour mixtures ==
A similar product to kamajahu is the Swedish skrädmjöl, a flour consisting exclusively of roasted oats which is traditionally made in the Swedish province of Värmland. It was brought there by Forest Finns.

In several Turkic languages, similar flours are called talqan, but these are made of coarse or finely milled flour from roasted barley or wheat, and typically do not contain legumes.

The Russian analogue of this product is called tolokno (Russian: толокно), which is generally made with oats that are first steamed, dried, and then ground into a flour. Tolokno is often mixed with milk, prostokvasha, tvorog, kvass, or simply water and eaten this way; tolokno can also be eaten with cream, sugar, sour cream, butter, or berries (often lingonberries). A common name for a porridge made with tolokno is dezhen' (Russian: дежень), and the dish symbolically marks the harvest period in some regions of Russia.

== See also ==
- Gofio
- Misutgaru
- Rubaboo
- Tsampa
