= Rubaboo =

Porridge

- Alternative names: Rubbaboo
- Type: Porridge/stew
- Place of origin: Canada
- Region or state: Rupert's Land
- Serving temperature: Hot
- Main ingredients: Peas or corn, fat (bear or pork), bread or flour, pemmican
- Variations: Rubaboo

Rubaboo is a common stew or porridge consumed by coureurs des bois and voyageurs (French fur traders) and Métis people of North America. This dish is traditionally made of peas and/or corn, with grease (bear or pork) and a thickening agent (bread or flour) that makes up the base of the stew. Pemmican and maple sugar were also commonly added to the mixture.

Rubaboo that is made by the Plains Métis is often made with pemmican, rabbit, prairie chicken or sage hen and a wide variety of wild vegetables such as wild parsnip (lii naavoo) onion, turnip, and asparagus that can all be added to the food with preference. The thickened mixture was later re-served as "rowschow" (re-chaud). Other sources describe it as consisting primarily of boiled pemmican, with thickening agents added when available.

== Origins ==
The etymology of the word is a blend of the French word roux (a thickener used in gravies and sauces) with the word for soup ("aboo") from an Algonquian language, such as Anishnaabe ᓇᐴ naboo. Although pemmican can be added to the stew, Rubaboo and pemmican remain separate dishes, but are culturally linked closely to each other in Metis history.

== See also ==
- Kama (food)
- List of porridges
- List of stews

== Sources ==
- Arts, A. A. (2009, January 1). About Us. Retrieved 22 November 2019 from http://albertaaboriginalarts.ca/
- Barkwell, Lawrence J.; Dorion, Leah; Hourie, Audreen (2006). Métis Legacy (Volume II) Michif Culture, Heritage, and Folkways. Winnipeg: Pemmican Publications Inc. and Saskatoon: Gabriel Dumont Institute. ISBN 0-920915-80-9.
- Gordon, Irene Ternier (1 February 2011). A People on the Move: The Métis of the Western Plains. Heritage House Publishing Co. p. 20 ISBN 9781926936123 Retrieved 21 November 2019.
- Weaver, S. M., Brockway, R. W., & Blue, A. W. (1982). Book Reviews. Canadian Journal of Native Studies, Vol. 2, Pp. 395–414., Vol. 2, 395–414.Retrieved 22 November 2019 from https://iportal.usask.ca/index.php?t=display_solr_search&having=4303766&sid=168308311
- PEMMICAN.(1961). Nutrition Reviews, 19(3), 73–75. Retrieved 23 November 2019 from https://academic.oup.com/nutritionreviews/article-abstract/19/3/73/2672002?redirectedFrom=fulltext
