= Mulgimaa =

Historical region in Estonia

Flag of Mulgimaa

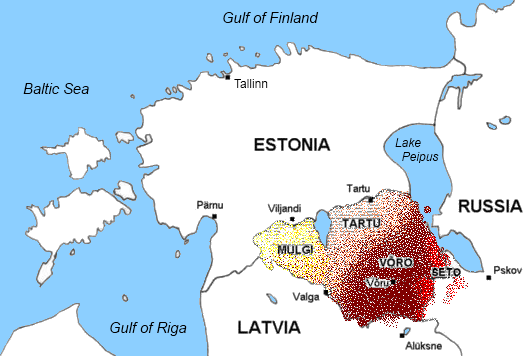
Area of South Estonian languages, including Mulgi dialect (yellow area)

Mulgimaa is a cultural-historical region in South Estonia. Today the region encompasses Viljandi County and northwestern Valga County. Historically, Mulgimaa was divided into five parishes (Estonian: kihelkond): Halliste, Helme, Karksi, Paistu, and Tarvastu.

Traditionally, the Mulgi dialect was spoken in Mulgimaa.
