= Barley flour =

Flour prepared from dried and ground barley

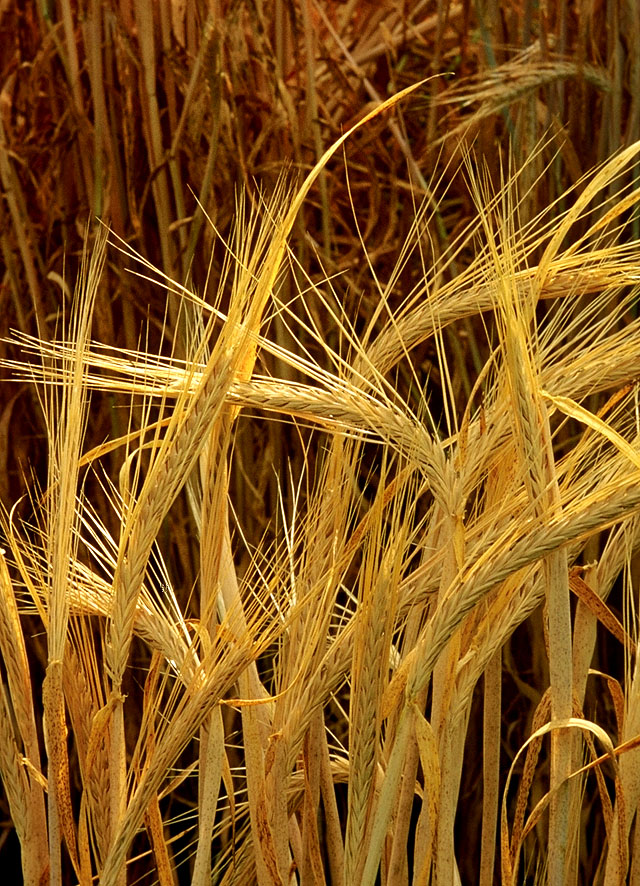
Barley flour is prepared from dried and ground barley (pictured).

Barley flour is a flour prepared from dried and ground barley. Barley flour is used to prepare barley bread and other breads, such as flat bread and yeast breads.

There are two general types of barley flour: coarse and fine. Barley groats are milled to make coarse barley flour, and pearl barley is milled to make fine barley flour.

Additionally, patent barley flour is a finer barley flour that is ground to a greater degree compared to fine barley flour.

== Uses ==
Barley flour is used to prepare breads such as barley bread. It is sometimes added to wheat flour, creating a composite flour, which is used to prepare various breads. Its addition to wheat flour creates a darker-colored baked end-product, and also alters the flavor of the product. Barley flour is also used as an ingredient in some specialty foods.

Barley breading is another food product prepared using barley flour, which can be prepared using pregelatinized barley flour and an additional product called barley crunch, similar to Grape-Nuts cereal.

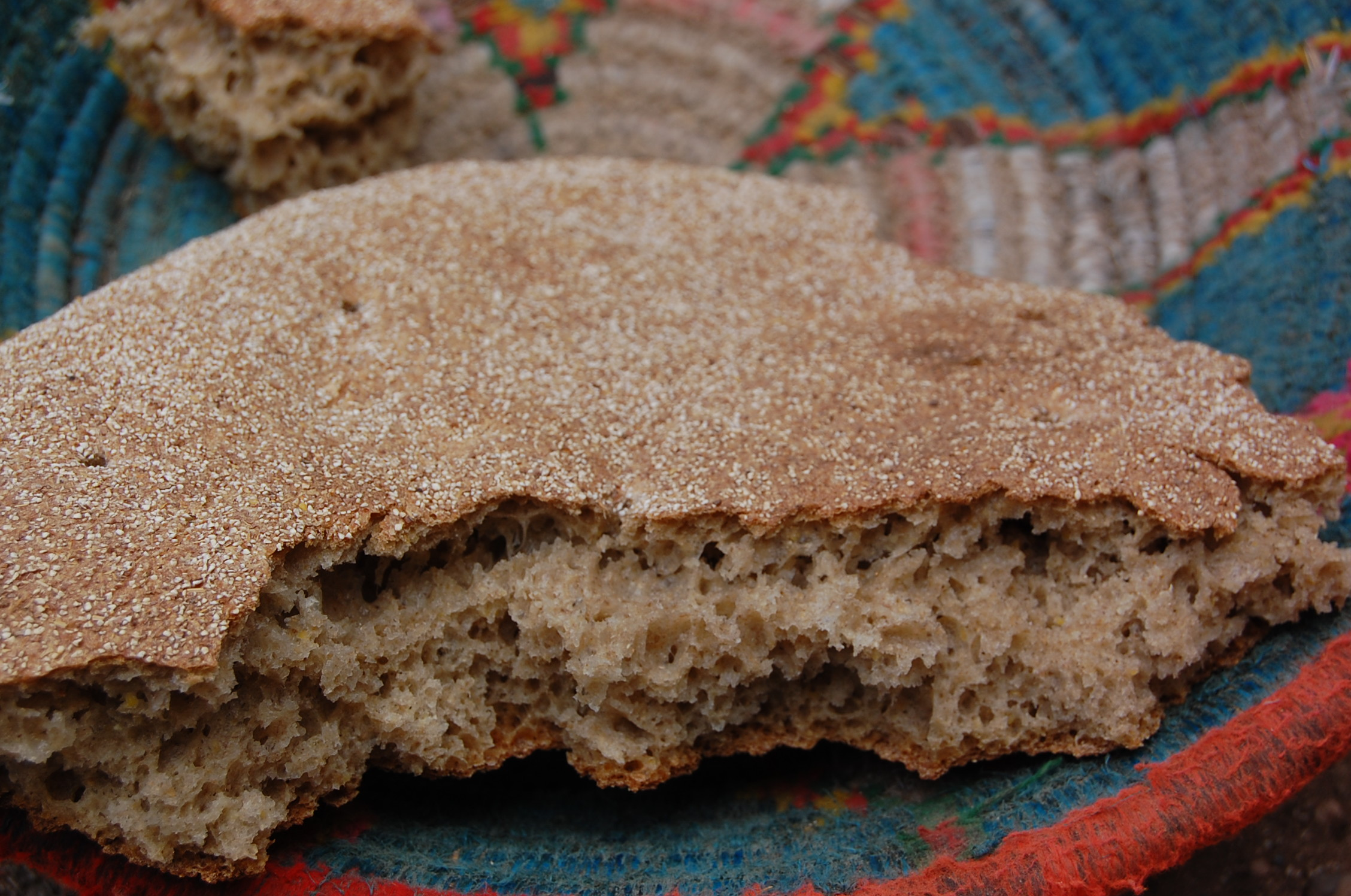
A basic barley bread

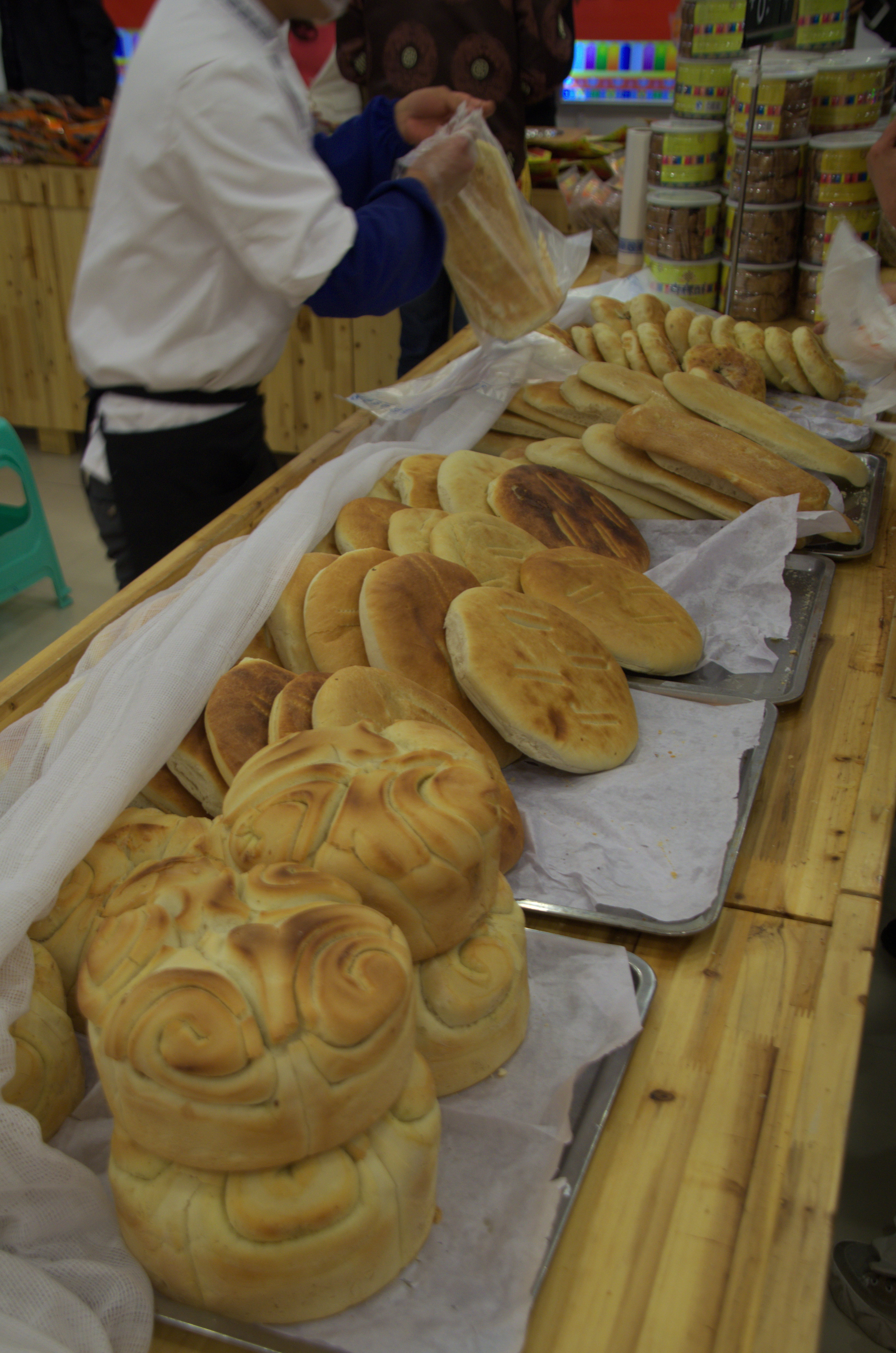
Barley breads prepared using highland barley in Songpan County, Sichuan province, China

== Malted barley flour ==
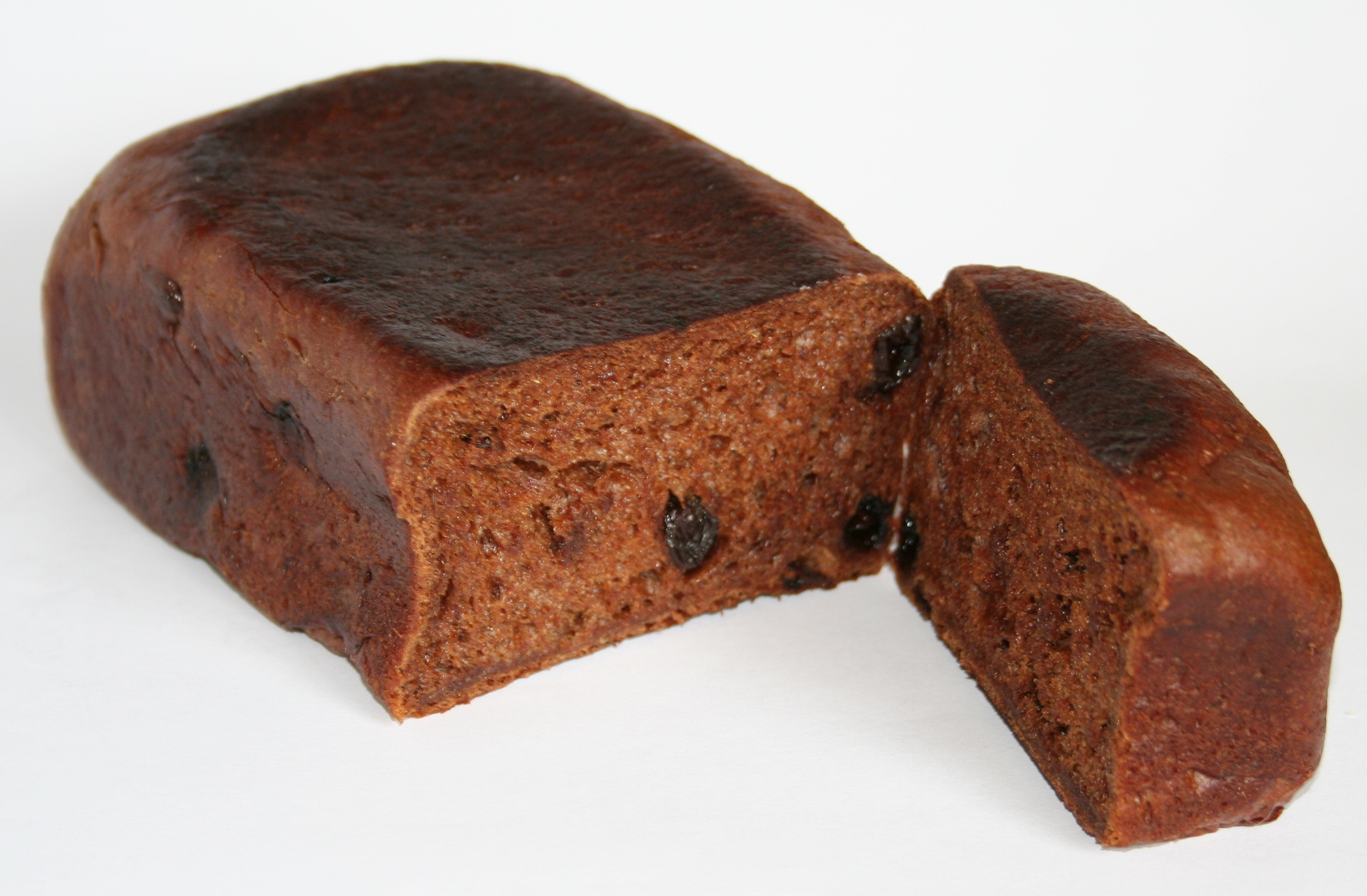
Malted barley flour is sometimes used to enhance the flavor of the malt loaf (pictured).

Malted barley flour is prepared from barley malt, which is barley that has undergone malting (partial germination [sprouting] followed by hot-air drying to stop germination). There are two kinds, diastatic and non-diastatic. Diastatic malt flour is used as a diastatic supplement for other bread flours that have low natural diastatic activity. Diastatic activity involves the conversion of starches into maltose (sugar). In baking, adding malted barley flour to wheat flour results in a moister product than would wheat flour alone. Malted barley flour that is rich in protein content is typically used in the food industry, while that which is poor in protein content is typically used to prepare a unique style of beer. While distatic malted barley flour is taste neutral, the non-distatic kind, sometimes referred to as malt flour, is used for its distinctive flavor. It has many uses, such as malted milk, and in baked goods, to give them a softer crumb, and to supplement the flavor of a malt loaf.

== Patent barley flour ==
Patent barley flour is a finer flour that is ground to a greater degree compared to fine barley flour. It is prepared from milling barley that has its outer layers removed to a greater degree compared to pearl barley. Patent barley flour is used as an ingredient in infant foods.

== See also ==
- Chalboribbang – Korean pancakes prepared using glutinous barley flour
- Flatbrød – a Norwegian bread prepared using barley flour, water and salt
- Raspeball – a Norwegian food made with Barley flour and Potatoes. often served with mashed Rutabaga, carrots, melted butter, bacon and meat
- Máchica – a flour made from ground toasted barley or other toasted grains
- Pinda – a rice ball of Hindu origin prepared using barley flour, ghee and black sesame seeds
- Pitepalt – prepared with barley flour and raw potatoes as primary ingredients
- Tsampa – a roasted flour prepared using barley flour, and sometimes wheat flour
