= Latin American cuisine =

Broad culinary traditions

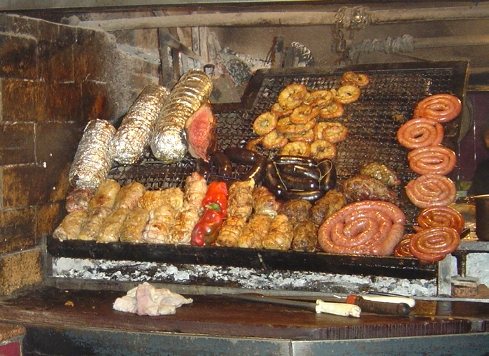
Asado with offal and sausages. Asado is a term used for a range of barbecue techniques and the social event of having or attending a barbecue in Argentina, Chile, Colombia, Ecuador, northern Mexico, Paraguay, southern Brazil, Uruguay and Venezuela. In these countries, asado is the standard word for "barbecue"

Latin American cuisine is the typical foods, beverages, and cooking styles common to many of the countries and cultures in Latin America. Latin America is a highly racially, ethnically, and geographically diverse with varying cuisines. Some items typical of Latin American cuisine include the maize-based dishes arepas, empanadas, pupusas, tacos, tamales, & tortillas, and various salsas & other condiments (guacamole, pico de gallo, mole, chimichurri, chili, aji, pebre). Sofrito, a culinary term that originally referred to a specific combination of sautéed or braised aromatics, exists in Latin American cuisine. It refers to a sauce of tomatoes, roasted bell peppers, garlic, onions, and herbs. Rice, corn, pasta, bread, plantain, potato, yucca, and beans are also staples in Latin American cuisine.

Latin American beverages are just as distinct as their foods. Some of the beverages predate colonization. Some popular beverages include coffee, mate, guayusa, hibiscus tea, horchata, chicha, atole, cacao and aguas frescas.

Latin American desserts are as rich and diverse as the region’s culinary heritage. They often feature tropical fruits, creamy textures, and the sweetness of ingredients like sugar, condensed milk, and caramel. Many desserts reflect a blend of Indigenous, European, and African influences. They include dulce de leche, alfajor, rice pudding, tres leches cake, teja, beijinho, flan, and churros.

== Traditional eating customs ==
There are many different kinds of traditions associated with eating in Latin America. There are a variety of special days where certain foods are consumed, as well as many holidays that are celebrated in Latin America.

=== Traditions ===
There are many forms of gratitude that inhabitants of Latin America employ when they discard excess food. Some people kiss the bread, while others cut it before discarding it. Other such traditions are upheld largely by the country, Argentina and Uruguay have one such tradition known as a "es:Ñoquis del 29" or "the Gnocchi 29,” where on the 29th of each month a family eats gnocchi, sometimes placing money under their plate to wish for abundance in the next month.

There is a holiday celebrated in Latin America known as Three Kings Day (otherwise known as Epiphany) which is celebrated on January 6 of each year where families feast in honor of the visitation of the Three Magi.

In many countries of Latin America families consume lentils on the first day of the New Year because they are thought to bring prosperity.

== Cultural influences ==
=== Amerindian influence ===
Information about Amerindian cuisine comes from a great variety of sources. Modern-day Native peoples retain a rich body of traditional foods, some of which have become iconic of present-day Native social gatherings (for example, frybread). Foods like cornbread are known to have been adopted into the cuisine of the United States from Native American groups. In other cases, documents from the early periods of contact with European, African, and Asian peoples allow the recovery of food practices which passed out of popularity in the historic period (for example, black drink). Archaeological techniques, particularly in the subdisciplines of zooarchaeology and paleoethnobotany, have allowed for the understanding of other culinary practices or preferred foods which did not survive into the written historic record. The main crops Indigenous Amerindians used in Mexico and Central America were corn and beans, which are used in contemporary dishes such as pupusas, tamales, pozole, chuchitos, and corn tortillas. The main Indigenous Amerindian crops used by Natives of South America were potatoes, corn and chuño, used mainly in modern-day Colombian, Ecuadorian, Peruvian, Chilean, Bolivian and Paraguayan dishes such as arepas, papa a la huancaína, humitas, chipa guasu, locro and many more.

=== European influence ===
Europeans brought their culinary traditions, but quickly adapted several of the fruits and vegetables native to the Americas into their own cuisines. Europe itself has been influenced by other cultures, such as with the al-andalus in Spain, and thus their food was already a mix of their world. The European influence for many Latin American cuisine mainly comes from Spain, Portugal, Italy, and to a lesser extent France, although some influences from cuisines as diverse as British, German and Eastern European are also evident in some countries' cuisines such as Argentina and Uruguay, which have Italian cuisine as a main influence, with great Spanish, British, German, Russian, French, Jewish, Armenian and Eastern European influence as well.

=== African influence ===
Africans brought and preserved many of their traditions and cooking techniques. They were often given less desired cuts of meat, including shoulder and intestines. Menudo, Mondongo, Chunchullo for example, was derived from the habit of the Spaniards of giving the slaves cow's intestines. Enslaved Africans developed a way to clean the offal and season it to taste. African slaves in the southern United States did the same thing with pig's intestines, creating the dish known today as chitterlings. In South America, the scraps of food the landlords did not eat were combined to create new dishes that nowadays have been adopted into the cuisines of their respective nations (such as Peruvian tacu-tacu) and (Ecuadorian guatita).

=== Asian influence ===
A wave of immigrants from Asia, such as China and Japan, also influenced the cuisine of Peru, Brazil, Panama, and Ecuador. The Chinese brought with them their own spices and food-styles, something that the people of Latin America accepted into their tables. Not only that, but several Asian restaurants also adapted many Latin American food-styles into their own. This case can clearly be seen in the Peruvian and Ecuadorian chifa.

=== Middle Eastern influence ===
Migration from the Levant (Lebanon, Syria and Palestine) to countries like Brazil, Colombia, Venezuela, Ecuador, and Argentina has made some foods like kibbeh a common staple.

== Caribbean ==
Caribbean cuisine is a fusion of Amerindian, European and African cuisine. These traditions were brought from the many homelands of this region's population. In addition, the population has created from this vast wealth of tradition many styles that are unique to the region.

Seafood is one of the most common cuisine types in the islands, though this is certainly due in part to their location. Each island will likely have its own specialty. Some prepare lobster, while others prefer certain types of fish. For example, the island of Barbados is known for its "flying fish."

Another Caribbean mainstay is rice, but the rice on each island may be a little different. Some season their rice, or add peas and other ingredients such as coconut. Sometimes the yellow rice is served on the side, but it is often part of a dish.

=== Cuba ===
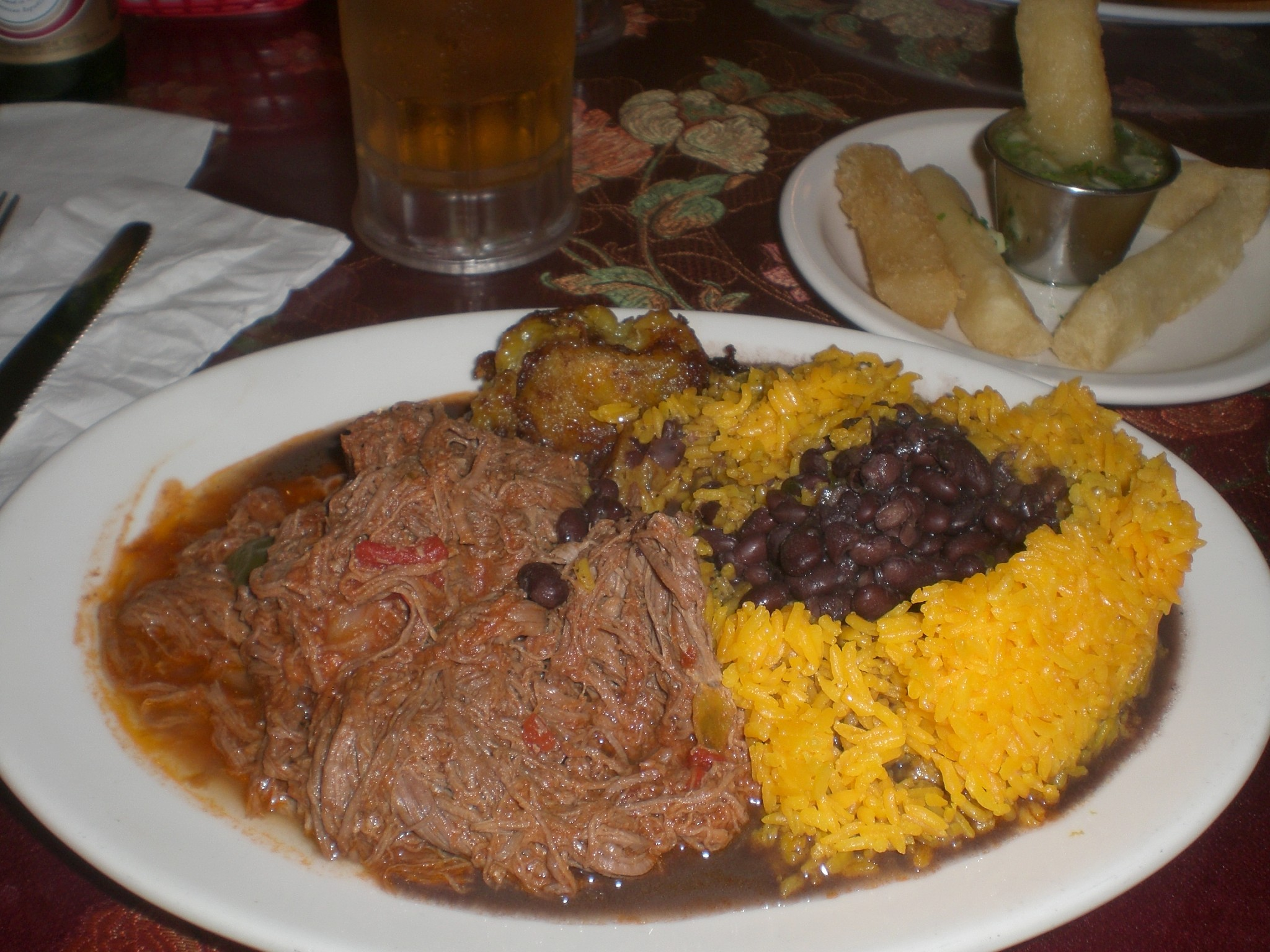
Cuban dish of ropa vieja, black beans, and yuca

Cuban cuisine is a distinctive fusion of Spanish, Indigenous, African and Caribbean cuisines. Cuban recipes share their basic spice palette (cumin, oregano, and bay leaves) and preparation techniques with Spanish and African cooking. The black Caribbean rice influence is in the use of local foods such as tropical fruits, root vegetables, fish, etc. A small but noteworthy Chinese influence is the daily use of steamed white rice as the main carbohydrate in a traditional Cuban meal. Rice is essential to a Cuban meal. It is usually eaten during lunch and dinner almost every day.

Unlike nearby Mexico and Central America, which have tortillas in their cuisines, the only resemblance to the use of tortillas is with casave, dating from pre-Columbian indigenous times which is called Casave. This flatbread is produced by grinding yuca (cassava) root to form a paste which, when mixed with water, becomes a dough. This is lightly cooked as a flat circular disk and air-dried to preserve it for consumption for a later time. It is traditionally reconstituted in salt water and eaten with roasted pork. The other culinary curiosity is a regional dish consisting of a roasted rodent uniquely found in Cuba, jutia (Desmarest's hutia).

=== Dominican Republic ===
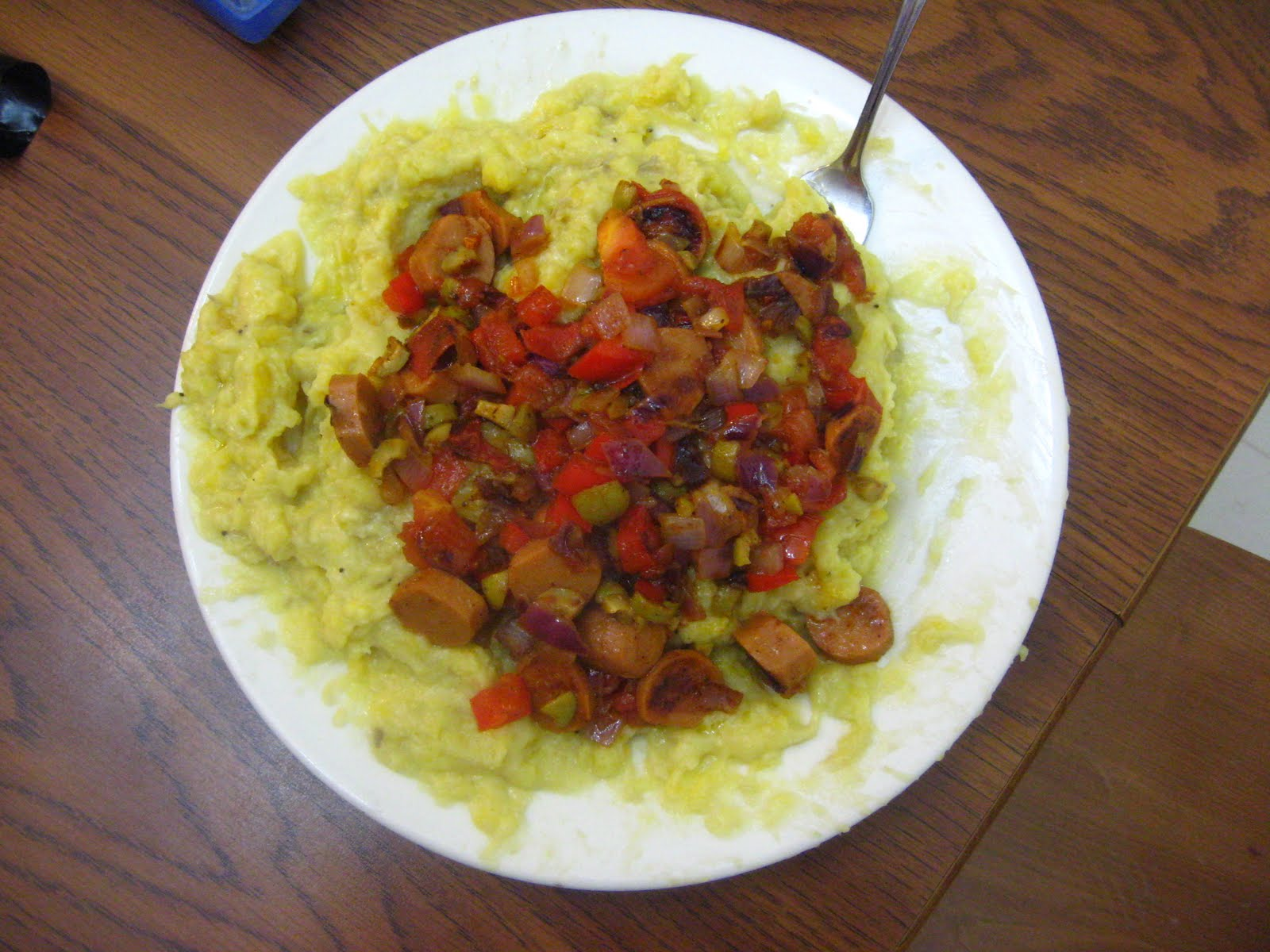
Mangú is a popular dish with origins in Africa and its fufu.

The cuisine of the Dominican Republic, much like its neighbors, is a fusion of Indigenous (Taino), Spanish, and African cuisines. All or nearly all food groups are accommodated in typical Dominican cuisine, as it incorporates meat or seafood; grains, especially rice, corn, and wheat; vegetables, such as beans and other legumes, potatoes, yuca, or plantains, and salad; dairy products, especially milk and cheese; and fruits, such as oranges, bananas, and mangos. However, there is heaviest consumption of starches and meats, and least of dairy products and non-starchy vegetables. Differences between Dominican cuisine and those of other parts of the West Indies include the milder spicing, which mainly uses onions, garlic, cilantro, cilantro ancho (culantro), ají cubanela (cubanelle pepper), and oregano.

Sofrito, locally known as sazón, a sautéed mix including local herbs and spices, is used in many dishes. Throughout the south-central coast bulgur, or whole wheat, is a main ingredient in quipes and tipili, two dishes brought by Levantine Middle Eastern immigrants. Other favorite foods and dishes include chicharrón, yautía, pastelitos or empanadas, batata (sweet potato), pasteles en hoja (ground roots pockets), chimichurris, plátanos maduros (ripe plantain), yuca con mojo (boiled yuca/cassava) and tostones/fritos (fried plantains

Cuisine also varies due to geographical areas. In general, most Dominican meat dishes tend to involve pork, as pigs are farmed quite heavily on the island. Meat dishes tend to be very well cooked or even stewed in Dominican restaurants, a tradition stemming from the lesser availability of refrigeration on the island. Seaside Dominican fishing villages will have great varieties of seafood, the most common being shrimp, marlin, mahi-mahi or dorado, and lobster. Most villagers more commonly dine on cheap, lesser-quality fish, usually stewed with la criolla, a type of rice. Premium seafood tends to be too expensive for the many locals, and is saved for the island's upper class and the tourist resorts.

=== Puerto Rico ===
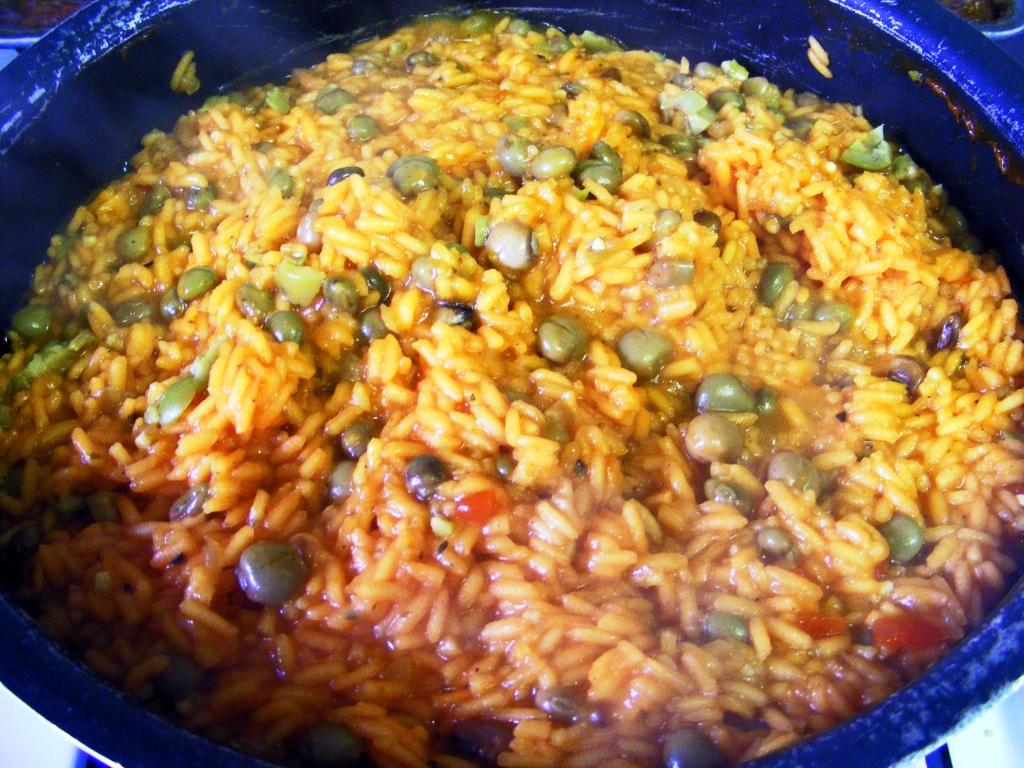
Arroz con gandules, regarded as "Puerto Rico national dish"

Puerto Rican cuisine has its roots in the cooking traditions and practices of the Amerindian Taínos, Europe (Spain), and Africa.

In 1493, Spanish colonizers began a period of great change on the islands. The Spanish introduced foods from around the world including Europe, Asia, and Africa. They realized that not all the food they introduced to this new location were viable. So, while they had to abandon some of what was fundamental to their home country, they began to discover the local assets such as pigs and cattle. Still, some of what the Spaniards brought to Puerto Rico became of great importance to modern traditional dishes such as plantains, bananas, and coffee; all of which are now prominent in current Puerto Rican food culture.

In the latter part of the 19th century, the cuisine of Puerto Rico was greatly influenced by the United States in the ingredients used in its preparation. Puerto Rican cuisine has transcended the boundaries of the island and can be found in several countries outside the archipelago. Many crops cultivated in Puerto Rico stem from New World origins like plantains.

== Central America ==
Central American cuisine is a fusion of Indigenous, Spanish and African influence. Most of the countries are within the Mesoamerica cultural and historic region. Some of its staple foods, such as maize, bell pepper, squash, beans, and tomatoes, originated and are native to the region and over time have become basic staples in other international cuisines around the world.

Its cuisine varies with its geographical areas, as well as its demographics. In the Pacific coasts of the countries in Central America, the influence of its food is more of an Indigenous and European infusion. In the Caribbean coast the fusion is more of an Indigenous and African fusion. The exceptions are El Salvador and Belize, the other two countries that do not border both the Pacific and Caribbean. However, their cuisines still possess a fusion of all three cuisines because of their own diverse history, and their neighboring countries' demographics.

Another staple in both Pacific and Caribbean cuisine of the area is rice. It is accompanied by meat (pork, beef, and chicken) or seafood. Dishes mixed with rice are common throughout the region, an example being gallopinto. The Caribbean coasts of Central America also have a more heavy usage of dishes containing coconut (milk, oil, etc.).

=== Costa Rica ===
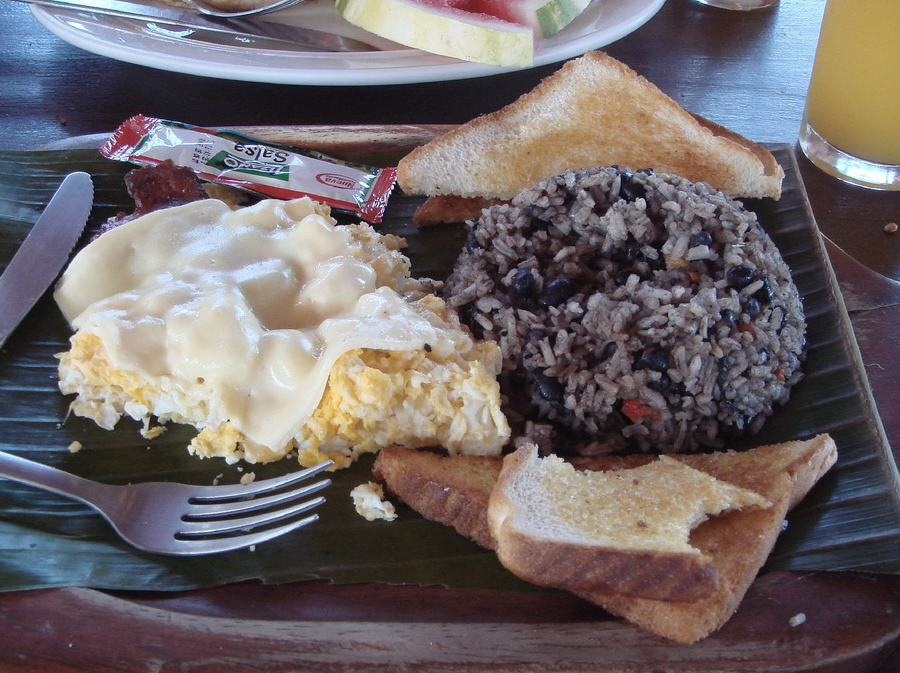
Gallo pinto of Costa Rica

The main staple, known as gallo pinto (or simply pinto), consists of rice and black beans, which in many households is eaten at all three meals during the day.

Other Costa Rican food staples include corn tortillas, white cheese and picadillos. Tortillas are used to accompany most meals. Costa Ricans will often fill their tortillas with whatever they are eating and eat it in the form of a gallo (direct translation: rooster, however, it resembles a soft Mexican taco). White cheese is non-processed cheese that is made by adding salt to milk in production. Picadillos are meat and vegetable combinations where one or more vegetables are diced, mixed with beef and garnished with spices. Common vegetables used in picadillos are potatoes, green beans, squash, ayote, chayote and arracache. Often, picadillos are eaten in the form of gallos.

=== El Salvador ===
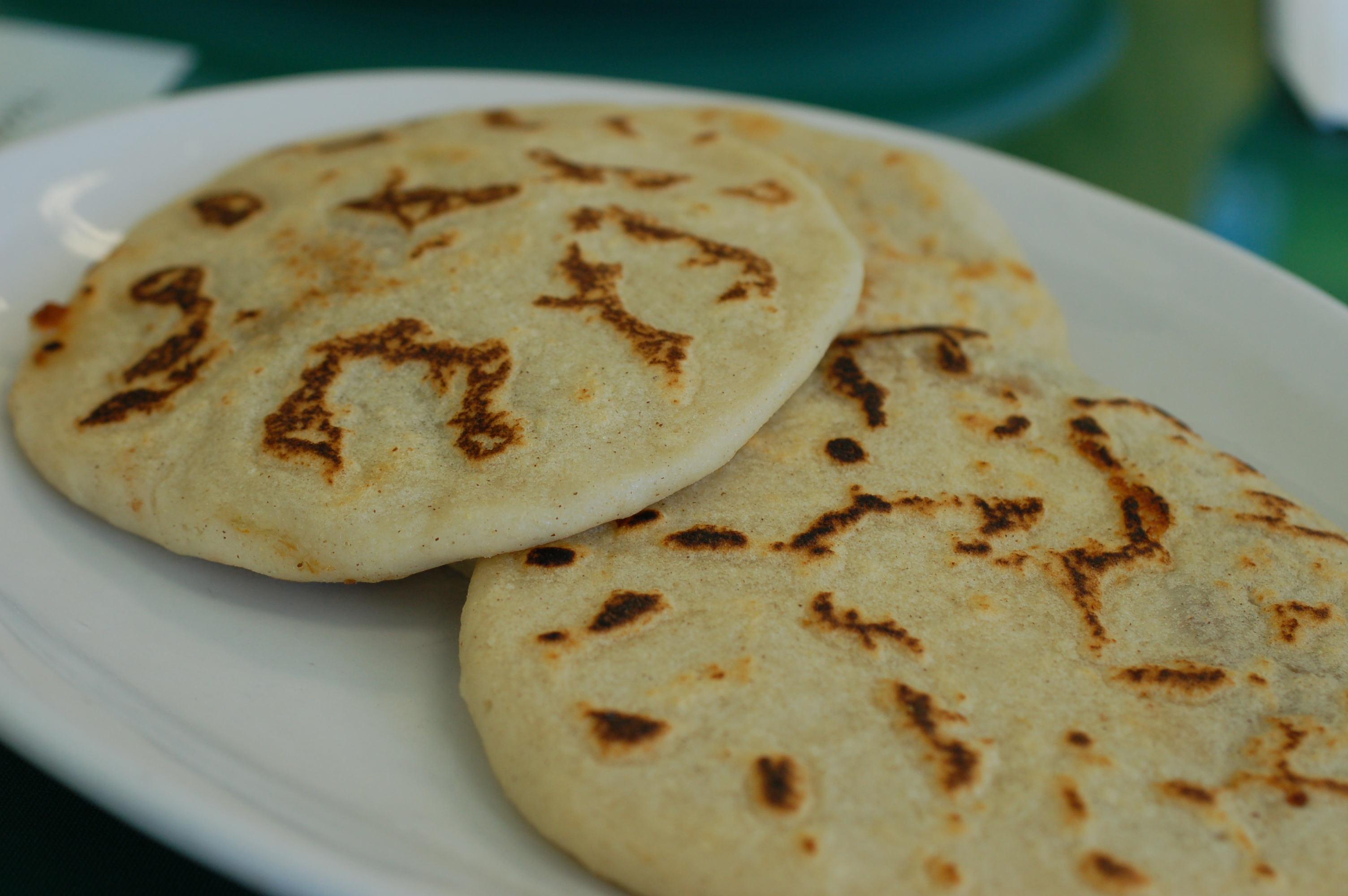
Salvadorian pupusas

Salvadoran cuisine is a style of cooking derived from the nation of El Salvador. The traditional cuisine consists of food from the Pipil people, with a European twist in most modern dishes. Many of the dishes are made with maize (corn).

El Salvador's most notable dish is the pupusa, a thick hand-made corn flour or rice flour tortilla stuffed with cheese, chicharrón (fried pork rinds), refried beans or loroco (a vine flower bud native to Central America). There are also vegetarian options, often with ayote (a type of squash), or garlic. Some adventurous restaurants even offer pupusas stuffed with shrimp or spinach.

Two other typical Salvadoran dishes are yuca frita and panes rellenos. Yuca frita, which is deep fried cassava root served with curtido (a pickled cabbage, onion and carrot topping) and pork rinds with pescaditas (fried baby sardines). The yuca is sometimes served boiled instead of fried. Panes con Pavo (turkey sandwiches) are warm turkey submarines. The turkey is marinated and then roasted with Pipil spices and handpulled. This sandwich is traditionally served with turkey, tomato, and watercress along with cucumber, onion, lettuce, mayonnaise, and mustard. A lot of Salvadoran food is served with French bread, or pan frances in Spanish.

=== Guatemala ===
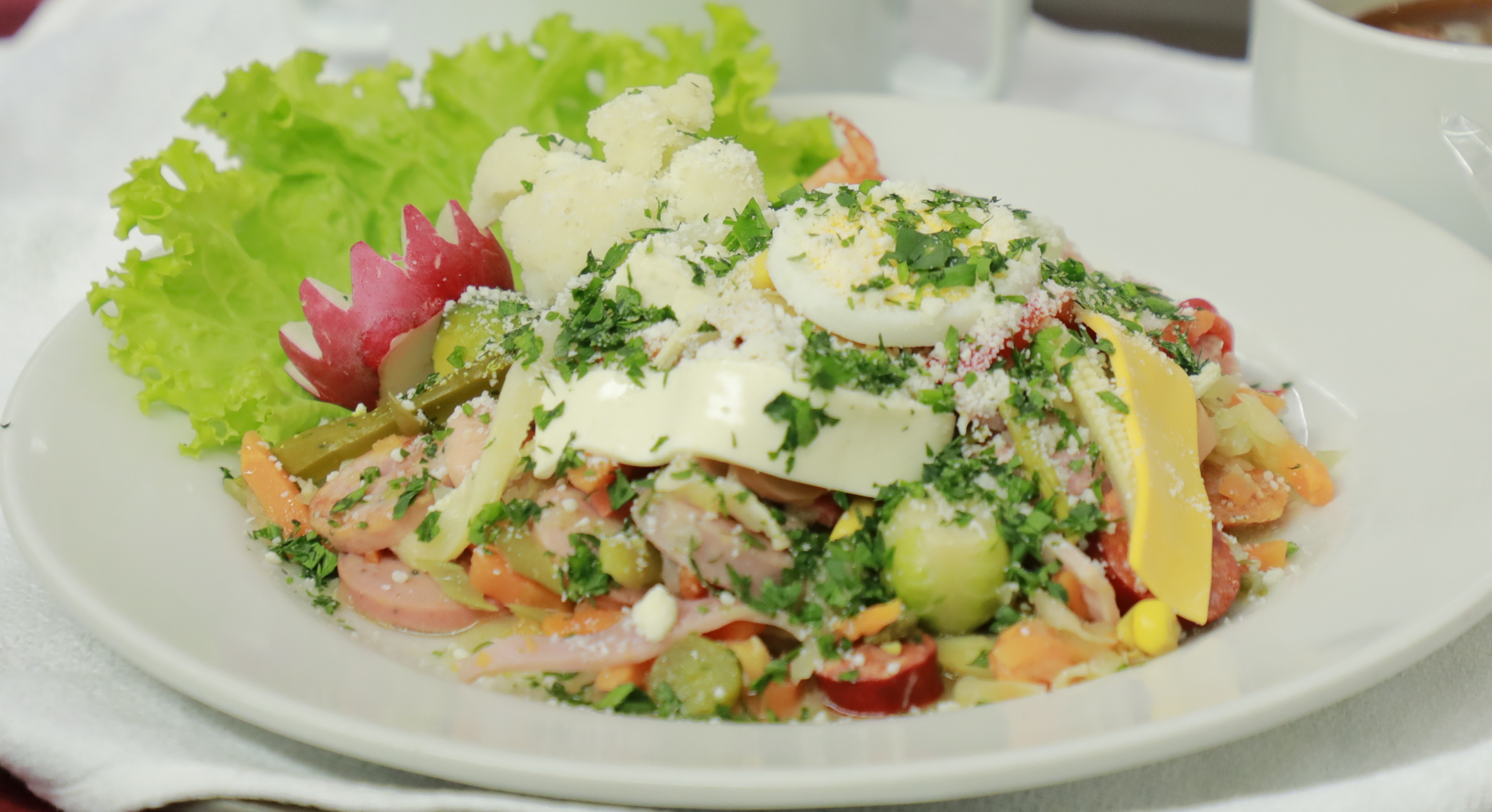
Fiambre, a traditional dish eaten in November. It consists of over 50 ingredients.

The cuisine of Guatemala reflects the multicultural nature of Guatemala, in that it involves food that differs in taste depending on the region. Guatemala has 22 departments (or divisions), each of which has very different typical foodstuffs. Guatemalan cuisine is widely known for its candy originating from Antigua Guatemala.

There are also foods that it is traditional to eat on certain days of the week - for example, by tradition it is known that on Thursday, the typical food is "paches" which is like a tamal made with a base of potato, and on Saturday it is traditional to eat tamales.

=== Honduras ===
Fried Yojoa Fish from Honduras

Honduran cuisine combines Spanish, Caribbean, and pre-Columbian influences of the indigenous Maya-Lenca population. Its most notable feature is that it uses more coconut than any other Central American cuisine in both sweet and savory dishes. Regional specialties include pollo con tajadas (fried chicken with fried green banana chips) fried fish, carne asada, and baleadas. Platano maduro fritos with sour creme are also a common dish.

In addition to the baleadas, the following are also popular: meat roasted with chismol carne asada, chicken with rice and corn, fried fish (Yojoa style) with encurtido (pickled onions and jalapeños). In the coastal areas and in the Bay Islands, seafood and some meats are prepared in many ways, some of which include coconut milk.

Among the soups the Hondurans enjoy are: conch soup, bean soup, Mondongo soup, or soup of intestine, seafood soups, beef soups, all of which are mixed with plantains, yuca, cabbage among other things, and complemented with corn tortillas.

Other typical dishes are the montucas or corn tamale, stuffed tortillas, tamales wrapped up with banana leaves, among other types of food. Also part of the Honduran typical dishes are an abundant selection of tropical fruits such as: papaya, pineapple, plums, epazotes, passionfruits, and a wide variety of bananas and plantains which are prepared in many ways.

=== Nicaragua ===
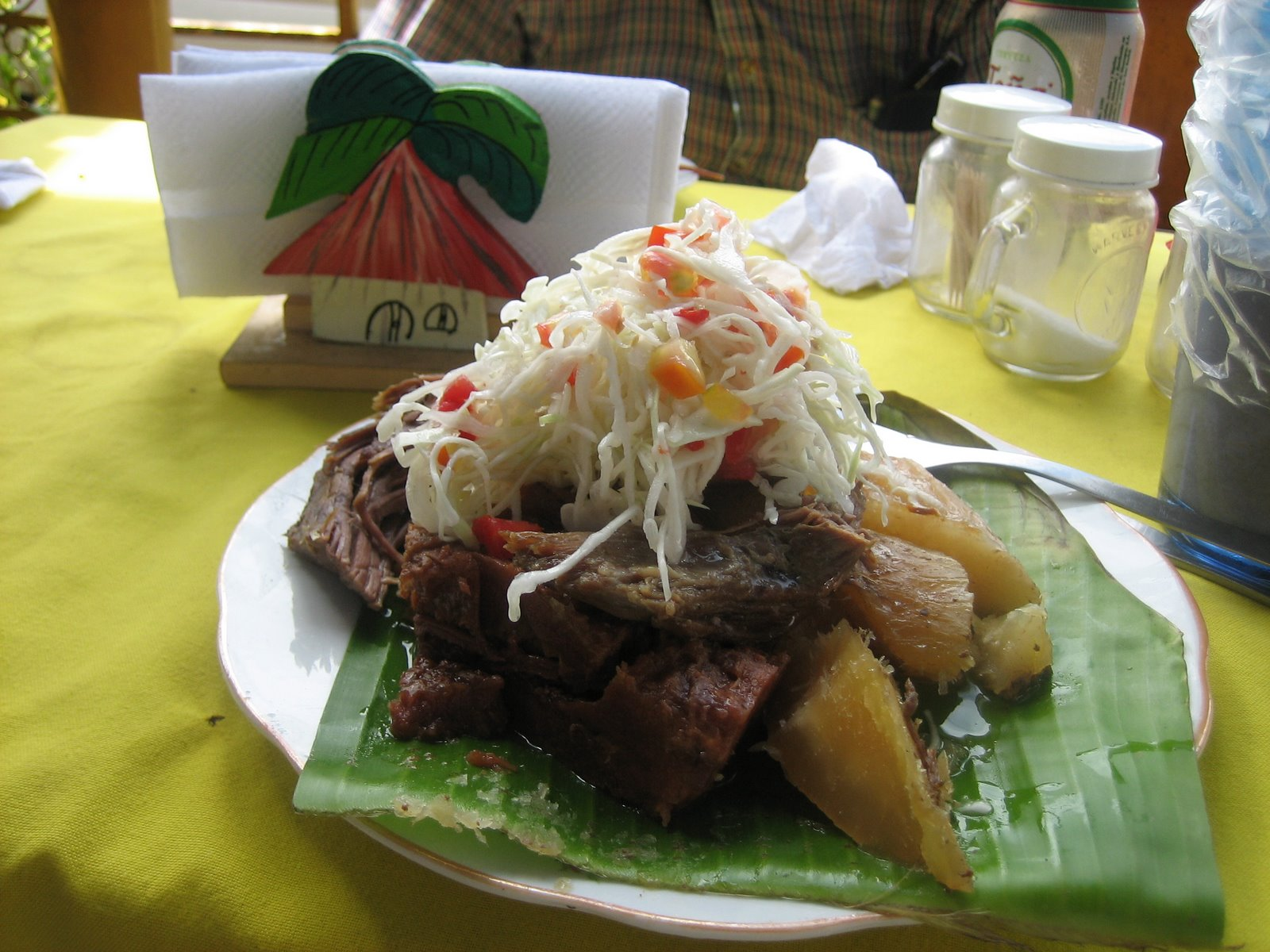
Baho, a traditional dish in Nicaragua

The cuisine of Nicaragua is a fusion of Spanish, Caribbean and pre-Columbian dishes of the indigenous peoples. When the Spaniards first arrived in Nicaragua they found that the indigenous peoples had incorporated foods available in the area into their cuisine. Despite the blending and incorporation of pre-Columbian and Spanish influenced cuisine, traditional cuisine changes from the Pacific to the Caribbean coast. While the Pacific coast's main staple revolves around fruits and corn, the Caribbean coast makes use of seafood and the coconut.

As in many other Latin American countries, corn is a main staple. Corn is used in many of the widely consumed dishes, such as indio viejo and quesillo. Nicaragua's most famous corn dish is the Nacatamal. Nacatamales originated from the Nicarao people. During pre-Columbian times, the Nicarao stuffed their nacatamales with hunted meats like deer and turkey, tomatoes, achiote and herbs to season and increase the nacatamal's flavor before being wrapped in corn husks and steamed. After Spanish conquest however, nacatamales were made with introduced meats like pork. They also evolved to include flavorful ingredients like onions and potatoes, and banana leaves replaced corn husks. Corn is also an ingredient for drinks such as pinolillo and chicha as well as in some sweets and desserts. Locally grown vegetables and fruits have been in use since before the arrival of the Spaniards and their influence on Nicaraguan cuisine. Many of Nicaragua's dishes include fruits and vegetables such as avocado, tomato, tomatillo, potato, jocote, grosella, mimbro, mango, papaya, tamarind, pipián, banana, yuca, and herbs such as cilantro, oregano and achiote.

Gallo pinto is Nicaragua's national dish, consisting of red beans and rice. The dish has several variations including the addition of coconut oil or grated coconut which is primarily prepared on Nicaragua's Caribbean coast. It is thought to have originated in Nicaragua; however, there is some controversy about the origins of this dish.

=== Panama ===
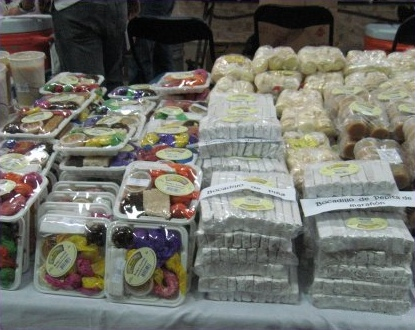
Panamanian sweets such as Huevitos de Leche, Bocadillos, and Manjar blancos

Situated between North and South America, Panamanian cuisine has access to a unique natural selection of tropical fruits, vegetables and herbs. Additionally, the Panama Canal paved way for a diverse mix of culture and their respective cuisines such as from the Hispanic, Amerindian, European, African, Colombian, Jamaican, and Chinese migrants. A common Panamanian diet includes seafood, chicken, and fruit paired with a beverage locally known as chicha.

== Mexico ==
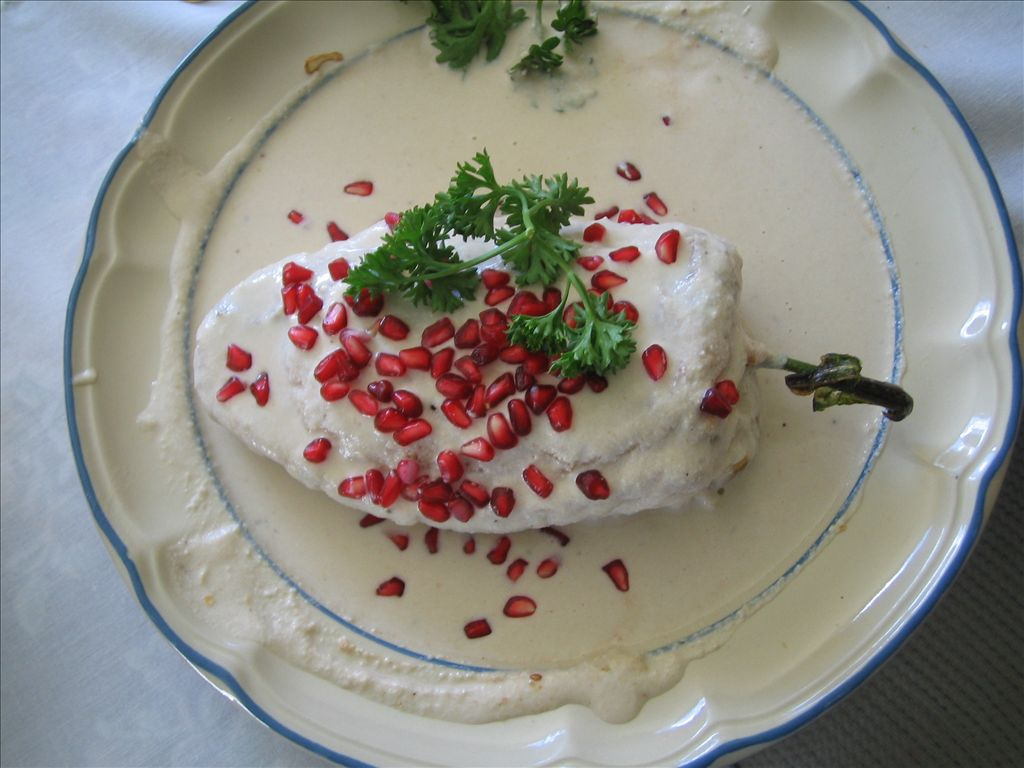
Chiles en nogada

Mexican cuisine is a style of food which is primarily a fusion of indigenous Mesoamerican cooking with European (especially Spanish) cooking developed after the Spanish conquest of the Aztec Empire. The basic staples remain the native corn, beans and chili peppers but the Europeans introduced a large number of other foods, the most important of which were meat from domesticated animals (beef, pork, chicken, goat and sheep), dairy products (especially cheese) and various herbs and spices. While the Spanish initially tried to superimpose their diet on the country, this was not possible thanks largely to Mexico's highly developed indigenous cuisines. Instead, the foods and cooking techniques of both the indigenous Mexicans and the Spanish began to be mixed contributing to the development of an even more varied and rich cuisine. Over the centuries, this resulted in various regional cuisines, based on local conditions such as those in the north, Oaxaca, Veracruz and the Yucatán Peninsula. Mexican cuisine is highly tied to the culture, social structure and its popular traditions, the most important example of which is the use of mole for special occasions and holidays, particularly in the South region of the country. For this reason and others, Mexican cuisine was added by UNESCO to its list of the world's "intangible cultural heritage".

Mexican-Americans in the United States have developed regional cuisines largely incorporating the ingredients and cooking styles of Mexican cuisines. Tex-Mex is a term describing a regional American cuisine that blends food products available in the United States and the culinary creations of Mexican-Americans influenced by Mexican cuisine. Mexican cuisine varies by region, because of local climate and geography and ethnic differences among the indigenous inhabitants and because these different populations were influenced by the Spaniards in varying degrees.

Central Mexico's cuisine is largely made up of influences from the rest of the country, but also has its own preparations of barbacoa, pozole, menudo, tamales, and carnitas.

Southeastern Mexico, on the other hand, is known for its spicy vegetable and chicken-based dishes. The cuisine of Southeastern Mexico also has quite a bit of Caribbean influence, given its geographical location. Veal is common in the Yucatán. Seafood is commonly prepared in the states that border the Pacific Ocean or the Gulf of Mexico, the latter having a famous reputation for its fish dishes, in particular à la veracruzana.

== South America ==
The richest products of South America come from the middle of the continent, the Amazonia Potatoes are frequently grown as a result of this, and also plants such as quinoa. The Peruvian capital, Lima, was declared the "Gastronomic Capital of the Americas" in 2006. Many plains are also on this continent, which are rich for growing food in abundance. In the Patagonian south of Argentina, many people produce lamb and venison. King crab is typically caught at the southern end of the continent. Antarctic krill has been recently discovered and is now considered a fine dish. Tuna and tropical fish are caught all around the continent, but Easter Island is where they are found in abundance. Lobster is also caught in great quantities from the Juan Fernández Islands.

=== Argentina ===
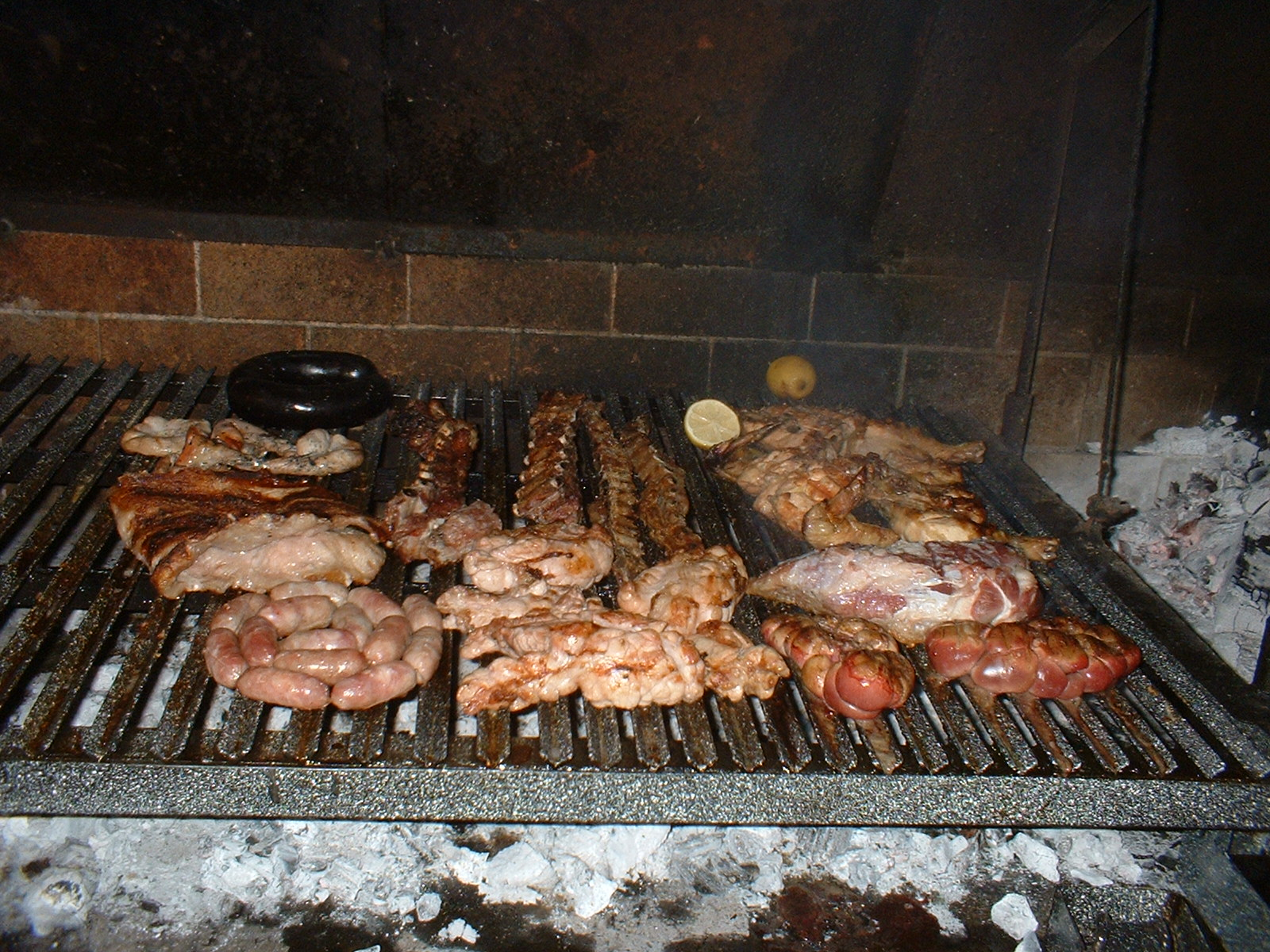
Asado of Argentina, a style of barbecue

The cuisine of Argentina is strongly influenced by Italian and Spanish cuisines and cooking techniques. Indigenous gastronomies derived from groups such as the Quechua, Mapuche, and Guarani have also played a role. There are many regional differences, specially in the provincial states of the north, west, east and central Argentina, with many plants, fruits and dishes that are not known or barely known in Buenos Aires.

Another determining factor in Argentine cuisine is that Argentina is one of the world's major food producers. It is a major producer of meat (especially beef), wheat, corn, milk, beans, and since the 1970s, soybeans. Given the country's vast production of beef, red meat is an especially common part of the Argentine diet. Due to the very large number of Argentines of Italian ancestry, pizza and especially pasta are also very popular, but there are food traditions from other European nations as well, including the English afternoon tea.

=== Bolivia ===
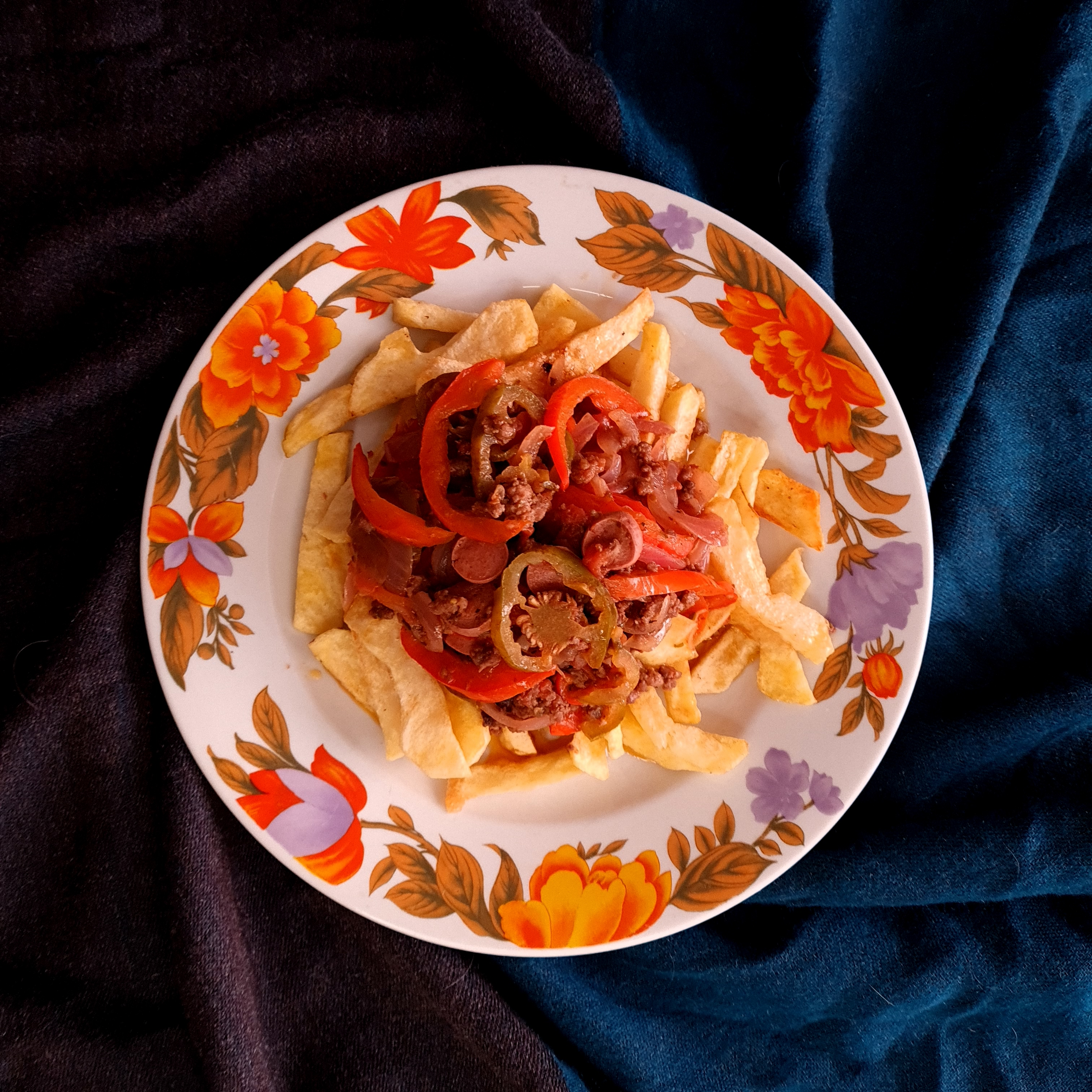
Pique Macho, one of the main Bolivian dishes

Bolivian cuisine is the result of Spanish cuisine with infusions of ancient Andean tradition and varies greatly due to the geography of Bolivia. It has been influenced by the Inca cuisine, Aymara cuisine, Spanish cuisine, and to a lesser extent the cuisines of other neighboring countries, like Argentina and Paraguay. European immigration to Bolivia is not as common when compared with other Latin American countries, and while German, Italian, Basque and other cuisines have influenced the cuisine of Bolivia, Spanish cuisine remains the primary influence.

In Western Bolivia in the Altiplano, due to the high, cold climate cuisine tends to use spices, whereas in the lowlands of Bolivia in the more Amazonian regions dishes consist of products abundant in the region: fruits, vegetables, fish and yuca.

Almuerzo is the most important meal of the Bolivian day, so much so that daily life tends to revolve around it. Long lunches are traditional throughout the country, so businesses and shops often close between the hours of 12 and 2 pm, so that the workers have time to return home for lunch. A typical Bolivian lunch would consist of several courses, including a soup, a main course of meat, rice, and potatoes, then a dessert and coffee. Lunch is taken at a leisurely pace and is traditionally followed by a nap, the oft-cited siesta.

=== Brazil ===
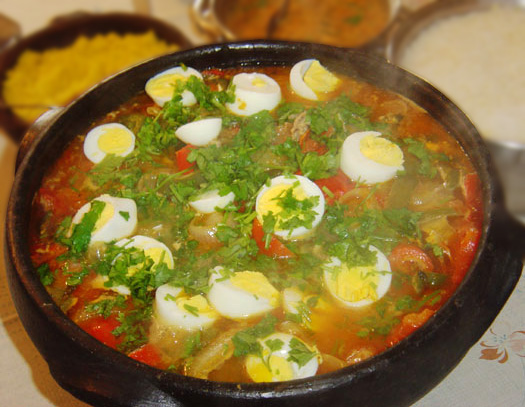
Moqueca of Brazil

The cuisine of Brazil, like Brazil itself, varies greatly by region. Brazilian cuisine can be divided into several distinct locations. From the north of Brazil through the Amazonian jungle, and directly down the Brazilian coastline.

This diversity reflects the country's mix of native Amerindians, Portuguese, Africans, Italians, Spaniards, Germans, Syrians, Lebanese and Japanese, among others. This has created a national cooking style marked by the preservation of regional differences.

Coffee, being one of the main agricultural products of Brazil, is an indispensable part of every Brazilian's diet. "Chimarrão," a caffeinated drink made of “erva mate”, and the super caffeinated "cafezinho" are commonly served at meals, between meals, and for snacks. The average Brazilian drinks 12-24 of these concoctions per day.

=== Chile ===
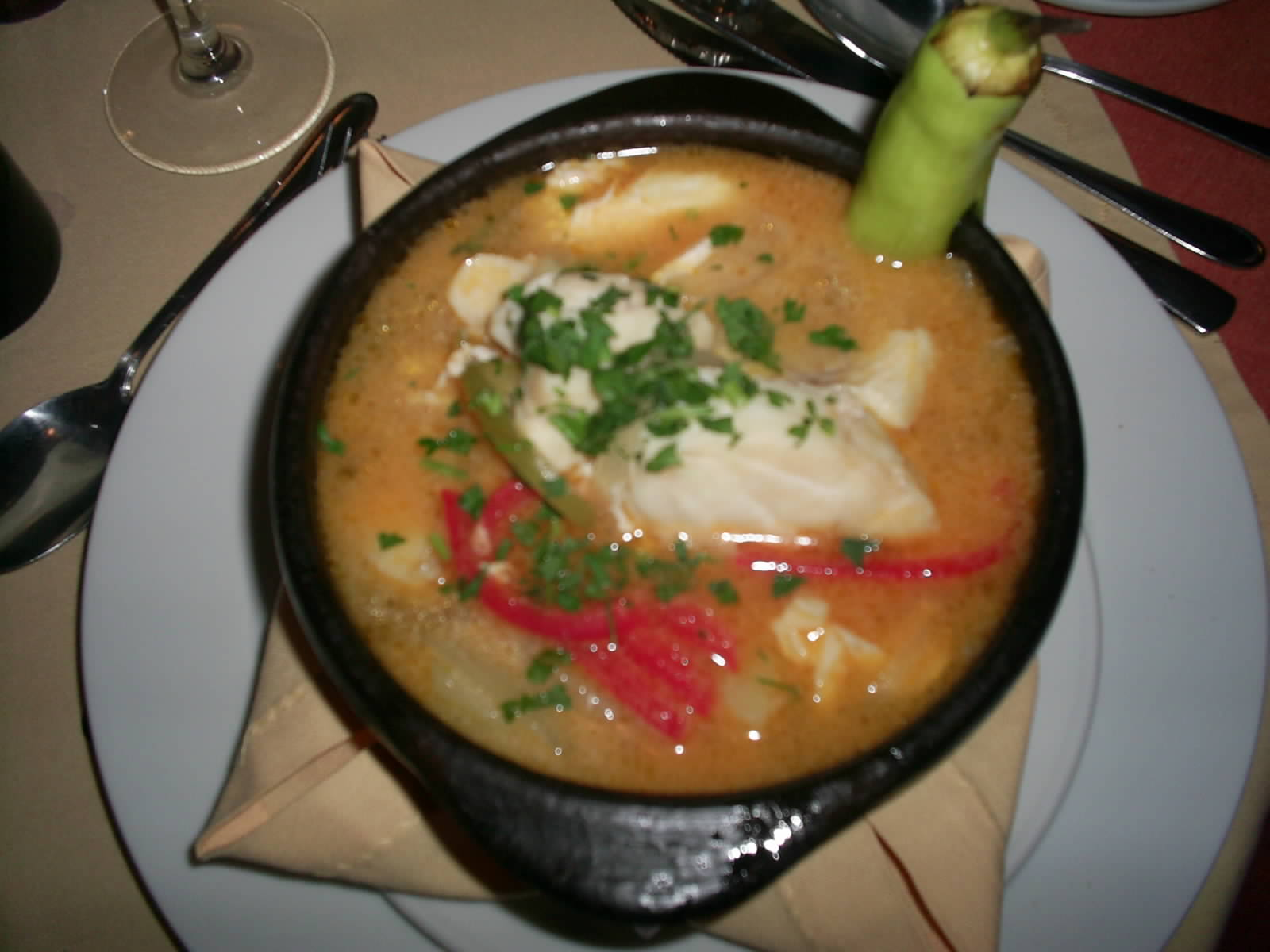
Caldillo de Congrio of Chile

Chilean cuisine stems from the combination of traditional Spanish cuisine with indigenous ingredients.

European immigrants also brought with them various styles and traditions in cooking, heavily influencing the cuisine of Chile, including Italian, German, and French influences as well as the English afternoon tea. These mixtures have created a unique fusion. Seafood is widely used and an array of produce which historically has grown throughout the region have been implemented into Chilean gastronomy. Many recipes are accompanied and enhanced by Chilean wine such as Curanto.

=== Colombia ===
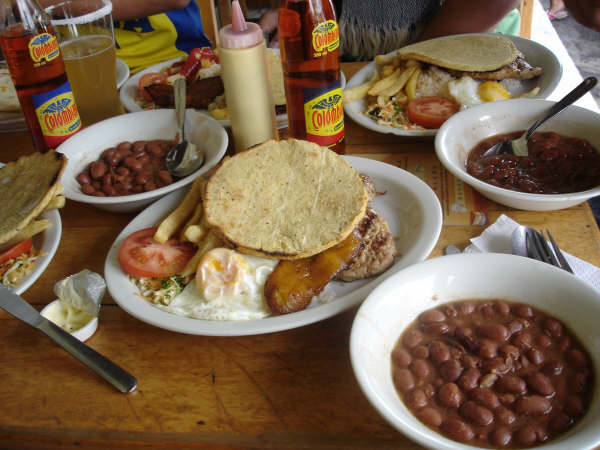
Bandeja paisa of Colombia

The cuisine of Colombia consists of a large variety of dishes that take into account the difference in regional climates. For example, in the city of Medellín the typical dish is the bandeja paisa. It includes beans, rice, ground meat or carne asada, chorizo, fried egg, arepa and chicharrón. It is usually accompanied by avocado, tomato and sauces.

Inland, the plates resemble the mix of cultures, inherited mainly from Amerindian and European cuisine, and the produce of the land mainly agriculture, cattle, river fishing and other animals' raising. Such is the case of the sancocho soup in Valledupar. Local species of animals like the guaratinaja, part of the wayuu Amerindian culture.

=== Ecuador ===
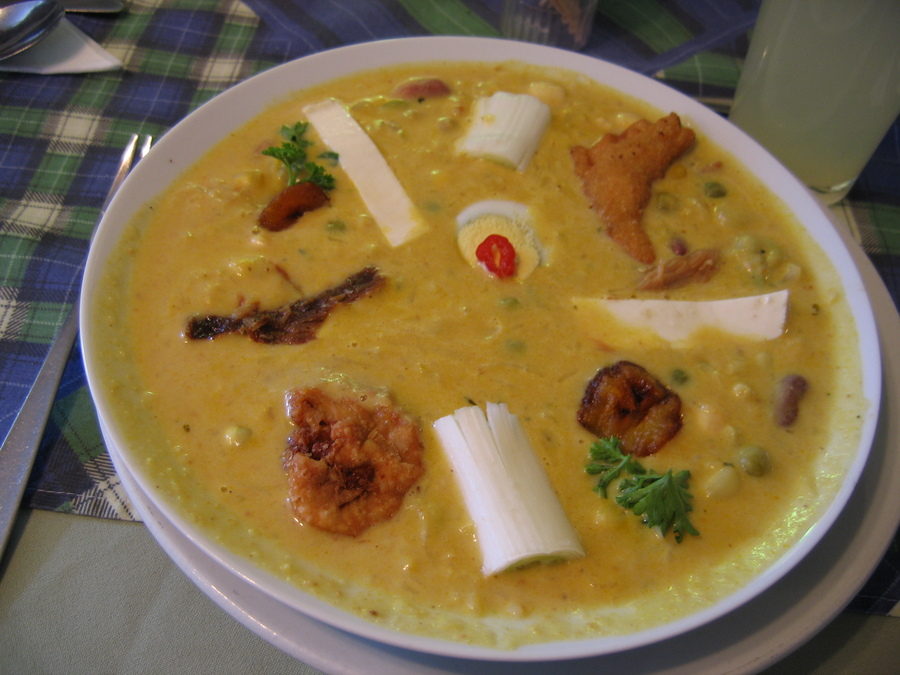
Fanesca of Ecuador

The food in Ecuador is diverse, varying with altitude, associated agricultural conditions, and ethnic and racial communities. Ecuadorian cuisine is an amalgamation of Spanish, Andean, and Amazonian cuisines and to a lesser degree Italian, Lebanese, African, and Chinese. Most regions in Ecuador follow the traditional 3 course meal of sopa/soup and segundo/second dish then dessert and a coffee are customary. Dinner is usually lighter and sometimes just coffee or agua de remedio/herbal tea with bread.

Beef, chicken, and seafood are popular in the coastal regions and are typically served with carbohydrate-rich foods, such as rice accompanied with lentils, pasta, or plantain, whereas in the mountainous regions pork, chicken, beef and cuy (guinea pig) are popular and are often served with rice, corn, or potatoes.

Some of the typical dishes in the coastal region are: a variety of ceviches, pan de yuca (cassava bread), corviche (plantain, peanut and fish dumplings), guatita, encebollado (fish, cassava and onion stew), empanada de viento (deep-fried flour empanada with cheese filling, served sprinkled with sugar), empanada de verde (green plantain empanada with cheese filling), mangrove crab, arroz con menestra (lentil or bean stew and rice) con asado, caldo de bola (beef soup featuring a green plantain ball filled with meat, egg, and spices). Local staples are rice, plantains and a great variety of seafood.

Typical dishes in the mountain region include: hornado, fritada, humitas, tamales, llapingachos, lomo saltado, and churrasco. Pork, chicken, beef, and cuy (guinea pig) are popular in the mountain regions and are served with a variety of grains (especially rice and corn or potatoes). A popular street food in mountain regions is hornado, consisting of potatoes served with roasted pig. Fanesca, a fish soup including several types of bean, is often eaten during Lent and Easter. During the week before the commemoration of the deceased or All Souls' Day, the fruit beverage colada morada is typical, accompanied by t'anta wawa which is stuffed bread shaped like children.

In the rainforest, a dietary staple is the yuca, elsewhere called cassava. The starchy root is peeled and boiled, fried, or used in a variety of other dishes. Across the nation it is also used as a bread, pan de yuca, which is analogous to the Brazilian pão de queijo and its often consumed alongside different types of drinkable yogurt "yogur persa" brought by Persian immigrants.

Chifa (from the Mandarin words 吃饭, meaning "to eat rice") Ecuadorian-Chinese fusion food is a mainstay of Ecuadorian cuisine.

=== Paraguay ===
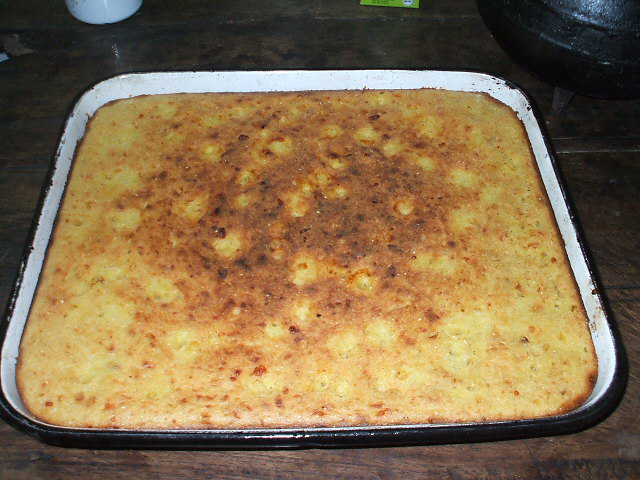
Sopa paraguaya

The cuisine of Paraguay is the set of dishes and culinary techniques of Paraguay. Much like its neighboring countries, Paraguayan cuisine is a fusion of Indigenous cuisine (Guaraní), Spanish cuisine and international cuisines from those who have immigrated over the years. Meat, especially beef, is a staple of the Paraguayan diet. This is reflected in the Asado, a series of barbecuing practices and the social event that are traditional to Argentina, Uruguay, and Paraguay.

The cuisine of Paraguay includes unique dishes such as sopa paraguaya, kiveve prepared using a pumpkin, also known as "andai", or Chipa Guasú. Chipa Guasú, an original dish to Paraguay, is a cake made with corn grains that is now widely served in Northeastern Argentina as well. The national drink of Paraguay is known as terere, in addition to fruit juices and soft drinks being very common throughout the country. Yucca and corn are two important ingredients in Paraguayan cuisine

=== Peru ===
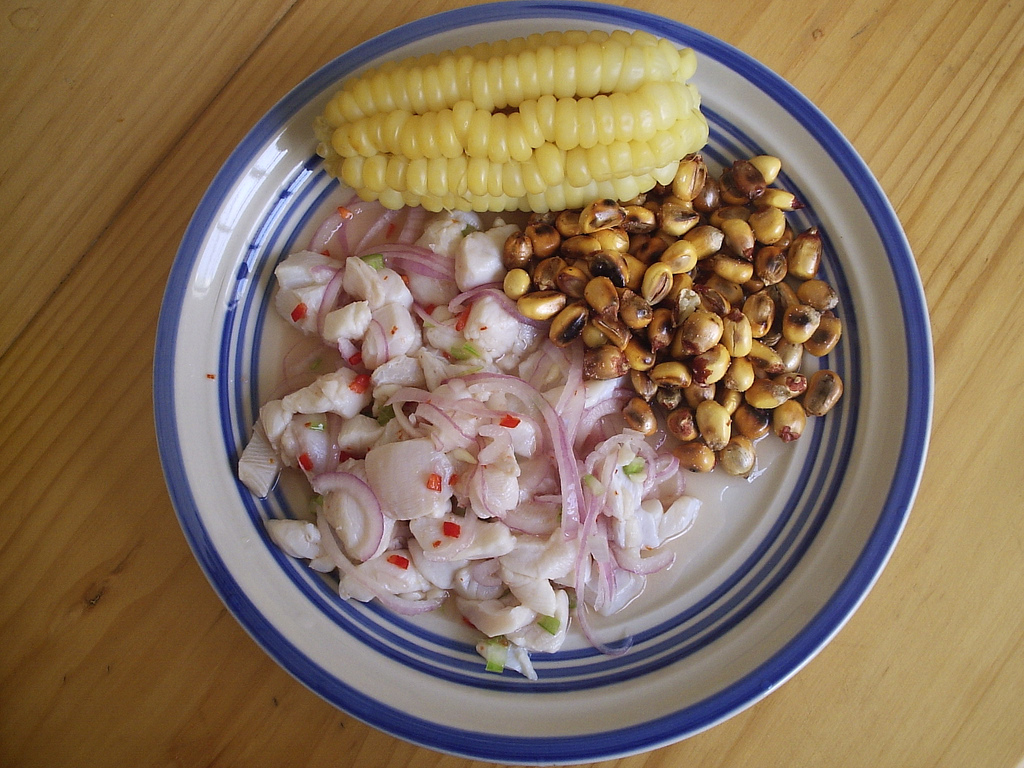
Ceviche, a Peruvian dish that has grown rapidly in popularity

Peru has a varied cuisine with ingredients like potato, uchu or Ají (Capsicum pubescens), oca, ulluco, avocado, fruits like chirimoya, lúcuma and pineapple, and animals like taruca (Hippocamelus antisensis), llama and guinea pig (called cuy). The combination of Inca and Spanish culinary traditions, resulted in new meals and ways of preparing them. The arrival of Africans, Chinese and Japanese immigrants in the 19th century also resulted in the development of Creole cuisine in the city of Lima, where the vast majority of these immigrants settled.

Some typical Peruvian dishes are ceviche (fish and shellfish marinated in citrus juices), the chupe de camarones (a soup made of shrimp (Cryphiops caementarius)), anticuchos (cow's heart roasted en brochette), the olluco con charqui (a casserole dish made of ulluco and charqui), the Andean pachamanca (meats, tubers and broad beans cooked in a stone oven), the lomo saltado (meat fried lightly with tomato and onion, served with french fries and rice) that has a Chinese influence, and the picante de cuy (a casserole dish made of fried guinea pig with some spices). Peruvian food can be accompanied by typical drinks like the chicha de jora (a chicha made of tender corn dried by the sun). There are also chichas made of peanuts or purple corn, known as chicha morada.

=== Uruguay ===
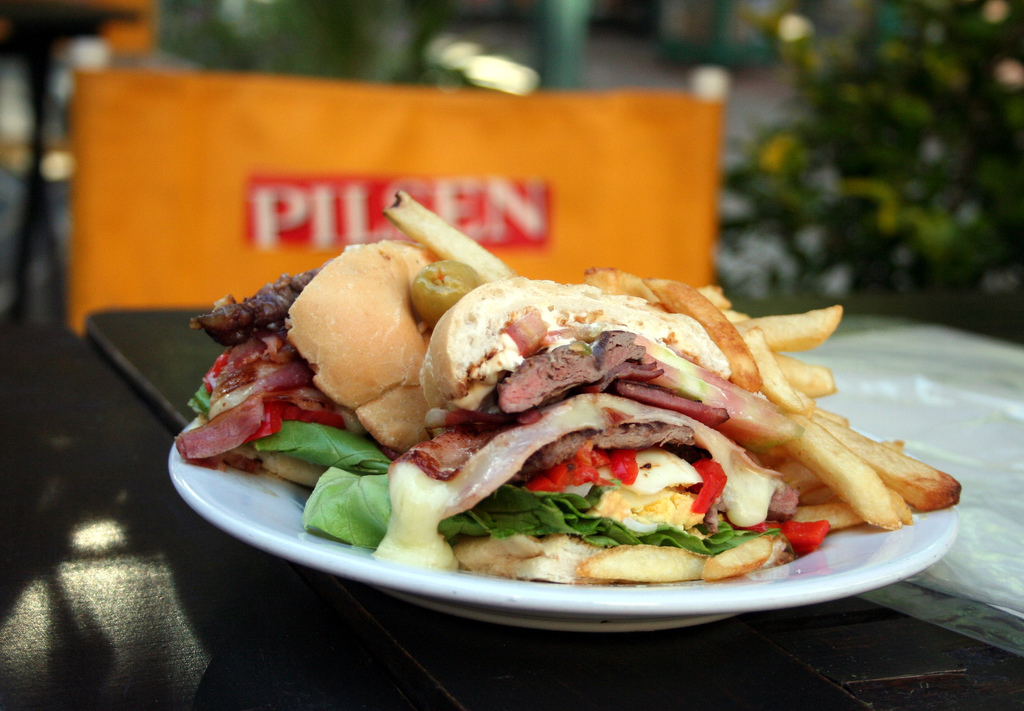
A complete chivito

The cuisine of Uruguay is traditionally based on its European roots, especially from Italy, Spain, France, Portugal, Germany and Britain. Many foods from those countries such as pasta, sausages, and desserts are common in the nation's diet. The Uruguayan barbecue, asado, is one of the most exquisite and famous in the world. A sweet paste, Dulce de Leche is the national obsession, used to fill cookies, cakes, pancakes, milhojas, and alfajores.

The base of the country's diet is meat and animal products: primarily beef but also chicken, lamb, pig, and sometimes fish. The preferred cooking methods for meats and vegetables are still boiling and roasting, although modernization has popularized frying (see milanesas and chivitos). Meanwhile, wheat and fruit are generally served fried (torta frita and pasteles), comfited (rapadura and ticholos de banana), and sometimes baked (rosca de chicharrones), a new modern style. Bushmeat comes from mulitas and carpinchos. Regional fruits like butia and pitanga are commonly used for flavoring caña, along with quinotos and nísperos.

=== Venezuela ===
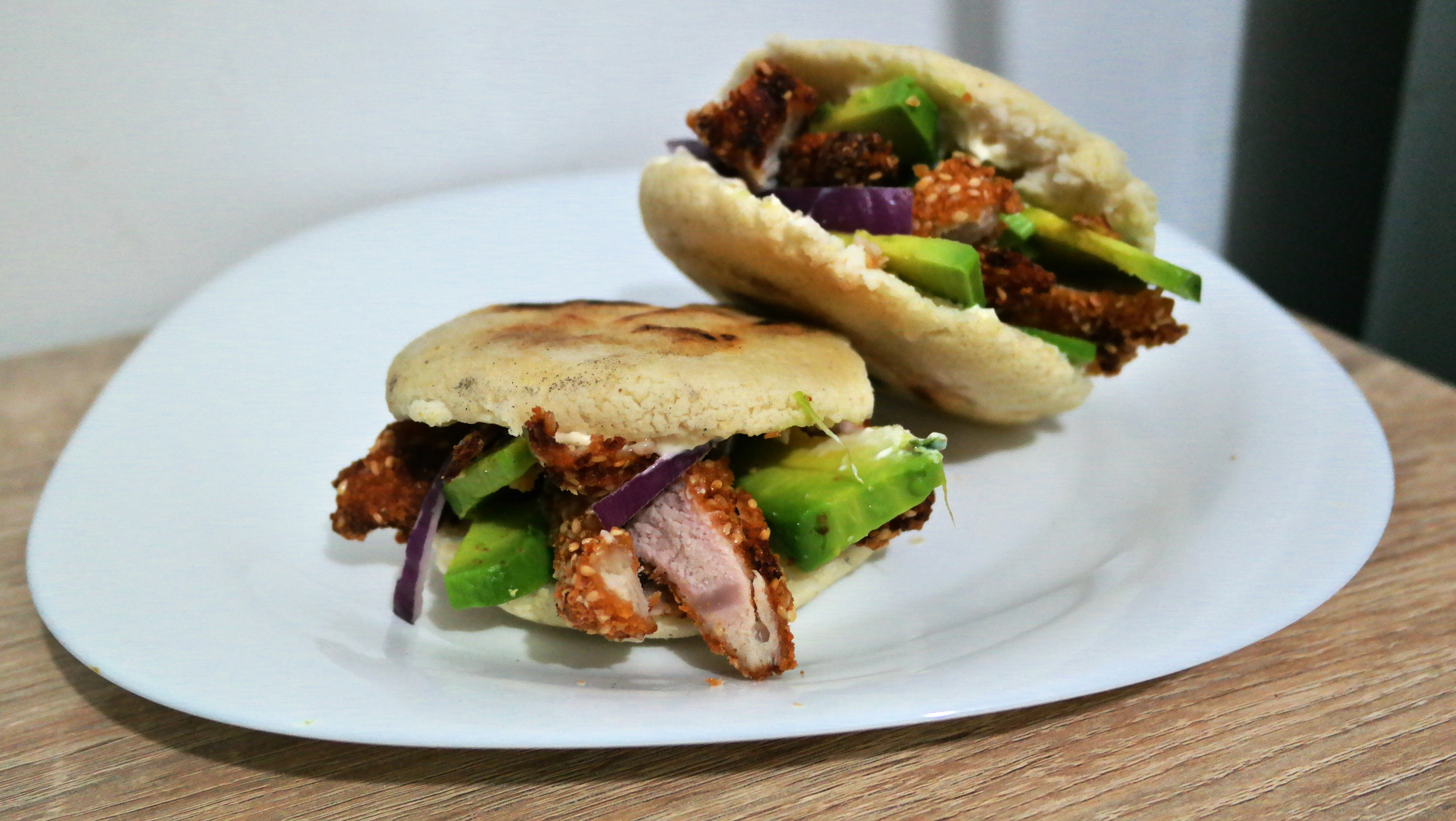
Arepas of Venezuela with chicken schnitzel, avocado, mayonnaise and red onion

Due to its land, diversity of agricultural resources, and the cultural diversity of the Venezuelan people, Venezuelan cuisine often varies greatly from one region to another. Its cuisine, traditional as well as modern, is influenced by its European, Amerindian and West African traditions. Food staples include corn, rice, plantain, yams, beans and several meats. Potatoes, tomatoes, onions, eggplants, squashes, spinach and zucchini are also common sides in the Venezuelan diet. Venezuela has several representative national dishes such as the arepa (a corn based bread like patty), pan de jamón, tequeño, pabellón criollo and the hallaca at Christmas time.

== See also ==
- Latin American culture
- List of cuisines
- Indigenous cuisine of the Americas (Amerindian cuisine)
  - Aztec cuisine
  - Inca cuisine
  - Maya cuisine
- North American cuisine
- South American cuisine
- Spanish cuisine
- Portuguese cuisine
