= Nicaraguan cuisine =

Mixture of indigenous Amerindian cuisine, Spanish cuisine, and Creole cuisine

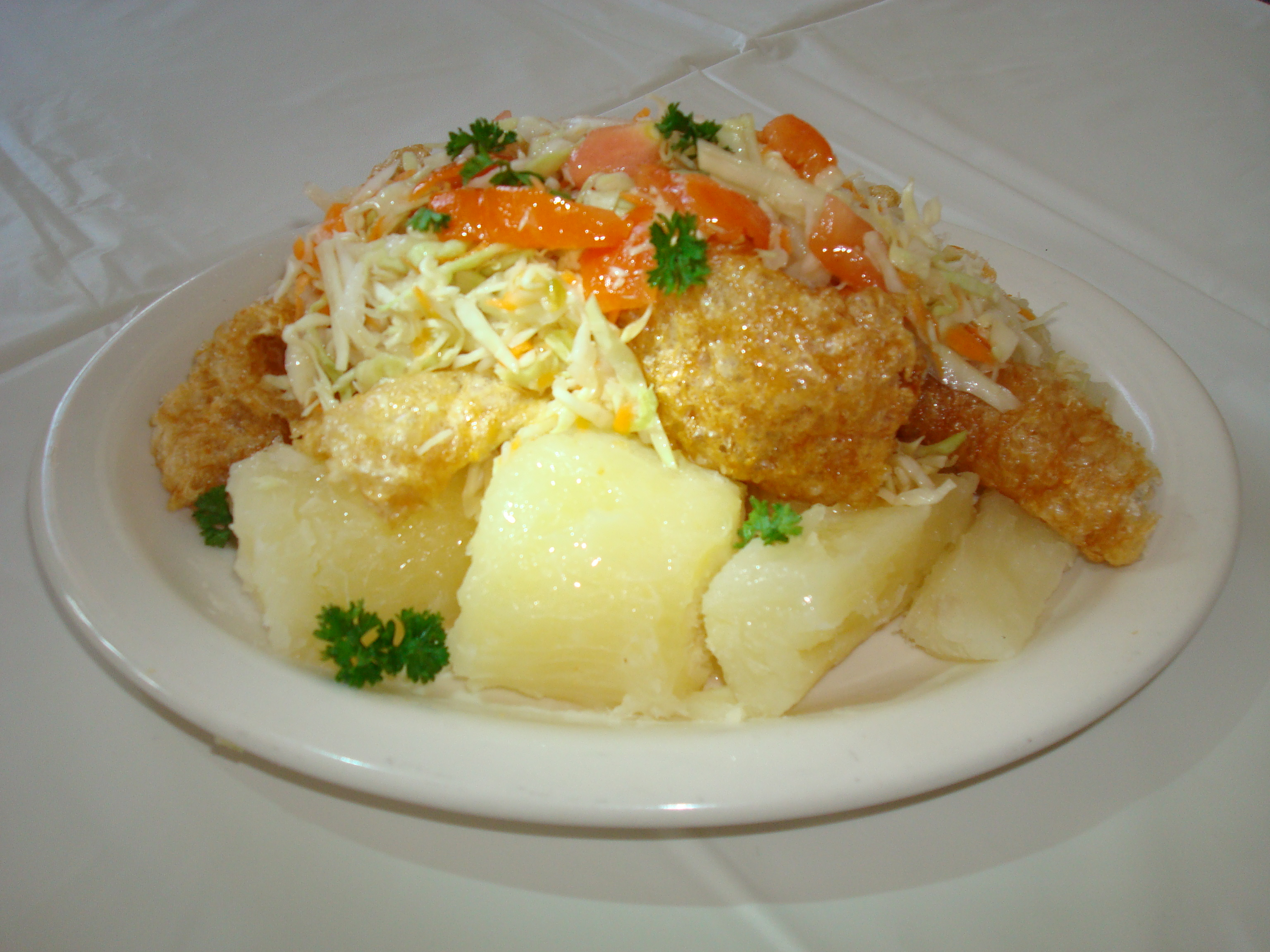
Vigorón, a traditional Nicaraguan dish

Life in Nicaragua

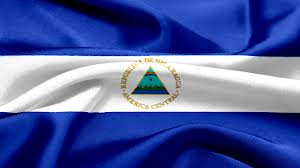

Cuisine
Culture
Demographics
Education
Holidays
Human Rights
Literature
Music
Politics
Religion
Tourism

Nicaraguan cuisine includes a mixture of Mesoamerican, Chibcha, Spanish, Caribbean, and African cuisine. Despite the blending and incorporation of pre-Columbian, Spanish and African influences, traditional cuisine differs from the western half of Nicaragua to the eastern half. Western Nicaraguan cuisine revolves around the Mesoamerican diet of the Chorotega and Nicarao people such as maize, tomatoes, avocados, turkey, squash, beans, chili, and chocolate, in addition to potatoes which were cultivated by the Chibcha people originating from South America and introduced meats like pork and chicken. Eastern Nicaraguan cuisine consists mostly of seafood and coconut.

The national dish of Nicaragua is gallo pinto.

== Cuisine ==
=== Main staples ===
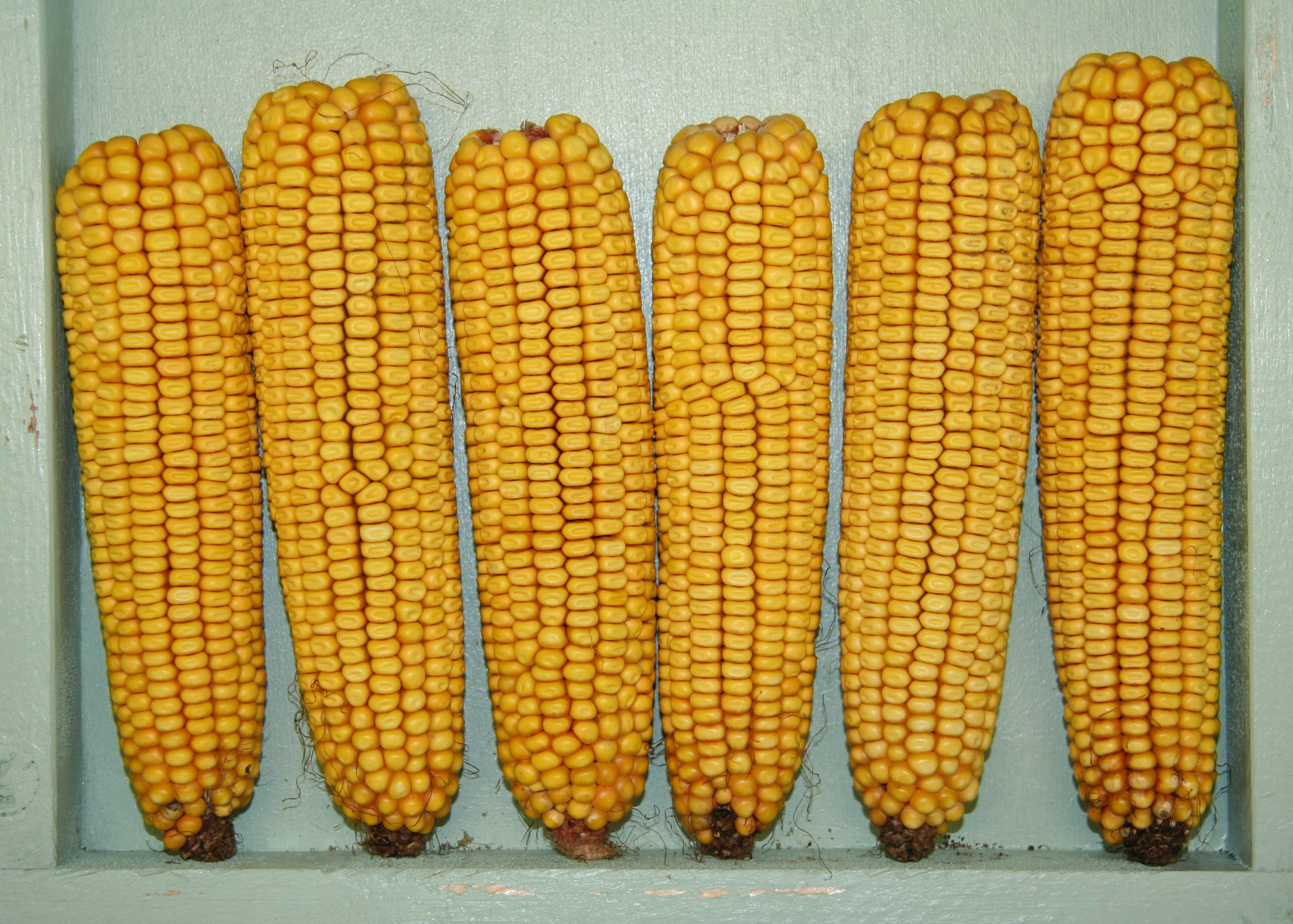
Corn is a staple food in Nicaragua.

As in many other Latin American countries, corn is a staple. It is used in many widely consumed dishes such as nacatamal and indio viejo. Corn is not only used in food; it is also an ingredient for drinks such as pinolillo and chicha as well as in sweets and desserts. Other staples are rice and beans. Rice is eaten when corn is not, and beans are consumed as a cheap protein by the majority of Nicaraguans. It is common for rice and beans to be eaten as a breakfast dish. There are many meals including these two staples; one popular dish, gallo pinto, is often served as lunch, sometimes with eggs. Nicaraguans do not limit their diet solely to corn, rice, and beans. Many Nicaraguans have small gardens of their own full of vegetables and sometimes incorporate flowers into their meals.

Commonly used ingredients are peanuts, cabbage (shredded in vinegar, this is called "ensalada" and served as a side dish, sometimes with carrots and beets added), carrots, beets, butternut squash, plantains, bananas, fresh ginger, onion, potato, peppers, jocote, grosella, mimbro, mango, papaya, tamarind, pipian, apples, avocado, yuca, and quequisque. Herbs such as culantro, oregano, and achiote are also used in cooking.

== Typical Nicaraguan dishes ==
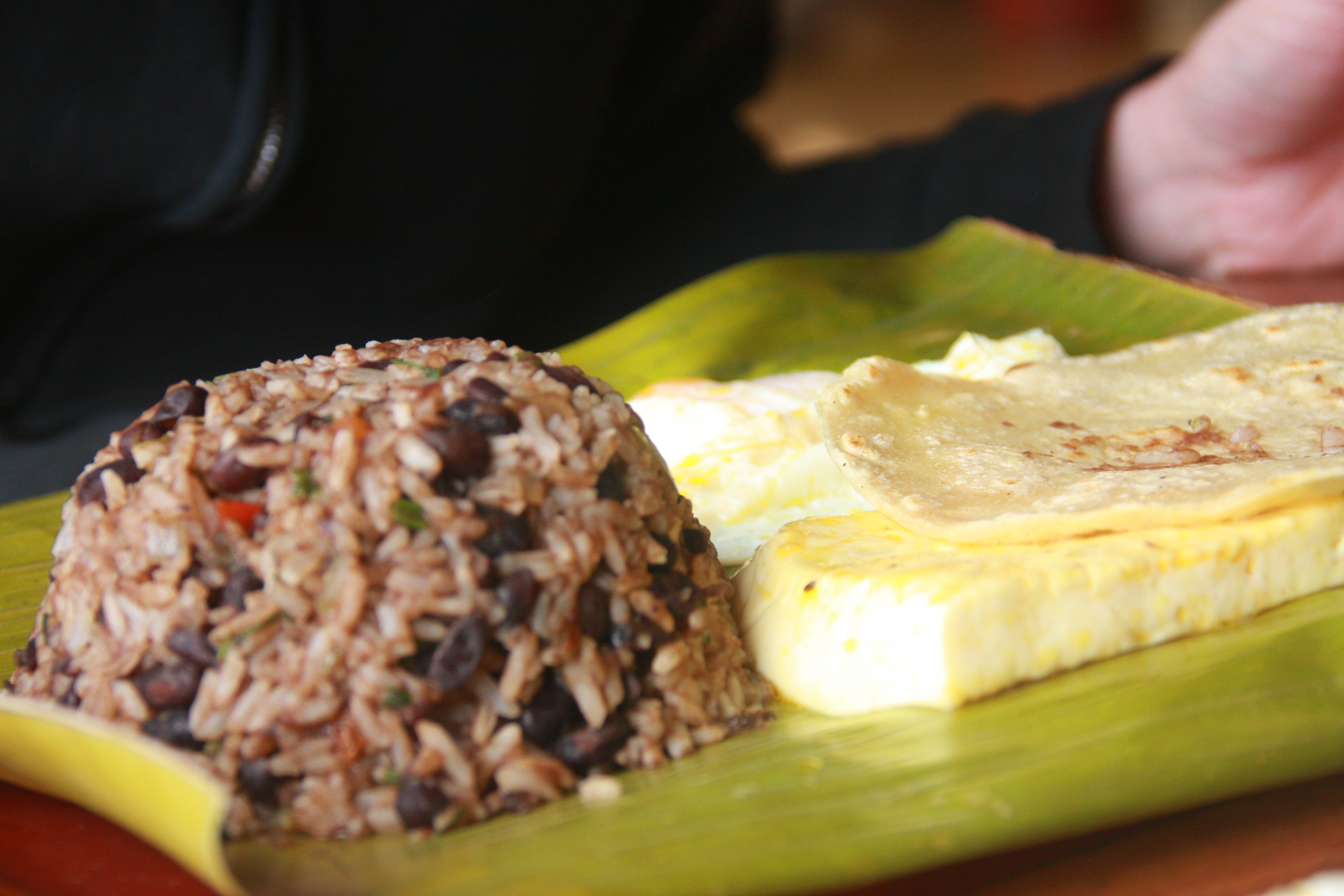
Gallo pinto

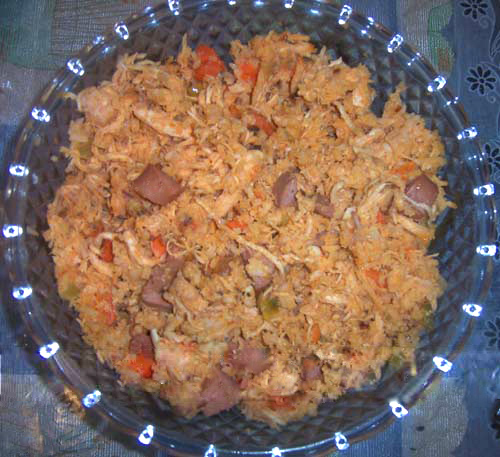
Arroz a la valenciana

- Arroz ancha
- Arroz aguado
- Arroz con pepino
- Arroz con pollo
- Berenjenas rellenas
- Brochetas
- Camarones al ajillo
- Carne asada
- Carne desmenuzada
- Carne enchorizada
- Carne pinchada - meat (such as beef or chicken) marinated in an alcohol-based sauce, using beer or wine, served on a stick.
- Carne sofrita
- Coctel de conchas
- Corazon asado
- Costillas asadas de cerdo
- Cusuco frito y desmenuzado
- Chancho adobado
- Chancho frito
- Chicharrón con chimichurri
- Churrasco con chimichurri
- Ensalada de aguacate
- Filete en tocineta
- Gallina rellena
- Gallo pinto
- Guacamol Nica
- Guiso de berenjenas
- Guiso de chayote
- Guiso de pipian
- Güirila
- Higado asado
- Higado en caldillo
- Higado frito
- Indio viejo
- Lengua
- Lengua fingida
- Lomo de venado
- Lomo entomatado y encebollado
- Lomo relleno
- Nacatamal
- Pechuga con queso
- Pechuga desmenuzada
- Pescozon
- Pescado a la Tipitapa
- Platanos fritos
- Posta en caldillo
- Punta de Salon henchida
- Quesillo
- Repocheta
- Rondón
- Salpicón
- Sopa de albóndigas
- Sopa de cola
- Sopa de frijoles
- Sopa de gallina con albóndigas
- Sopa de mondongo
- Sopa de pastora
- Sopa de pato
- Sopa de pescado
- Sopa de punche (cangrejo de mar)
- Sopa de queso
- Sopa de res o de hueso
- Sopa de sesos
- Sopa de verduras
- Sopa siete mares
- Substancia de carne o de higado
- Tacos al pastor
- Tajadas con ensalada and/or queso frito
- Tamal pisque
- Tamal relleno
- Tamales
- Tostones
- Vaho
- Venado asado
- Vigorón

== Beverages ==
=== Refrescos (drinks) ===
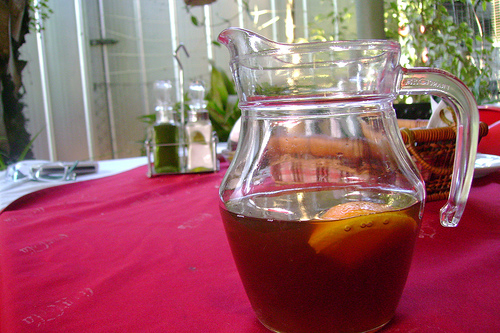
Chicha morada served with pipeño

Nicaraguan cuisine makes use of fruits, some of which are only grown in that particular region due to their location. Many fruits are made into drinks known as frescos, the Nicaraguan name for what are called "aguas frescas" in other Latin American countries. Common flavors include melon, tamarind, papaya, guayaba, guanábana, coconut, pineapple, and pitahaya. Pinolillo is very popular among Nicaraguans, as many times they refer to themselves as pinoleros, which means "pinolillo drinkers". Another popular beverage is the traditional drink of cacao mixed with maize or corn. Many drinks are also made from grains and seeds, mixed with milk, water, sugar and ice.

=== Alcoholic beverages ===
Rums, such as Flor de Caña and Ron Plata (both produced by Compañía Licorera de Nicaragua, S.A (CLNSA)), are both a popularly consumed beverage in Nicaragua and a crucial export product.

Popular rum-based cocktails include the "Nica libre," a regional re-naming of the Cuba libre (itself a variation of rum and coke), and the "Macuá" (containing orange, guava, and lime juices). The "Macúa" originated in 2006, when it won a Flor de Caña-sponsored competition to determine a marketable national cocktail representing Nicaragua, and was created by a pediatrician from Granada.

Beer is also a common alcoholic beverage consumed in Nicaragua. Popular brands include Toña and Victoria, two former competitors both now produced by Compañía Cervecera de Nicaragua, as of a 1996 merger.

=== Other drinks ===
- Achiote con limon
- Achiote con toronja
- Agua de arroz
- Arroz con Pino
- Arroz con piña
- Atol
- Avena (drink)
- Avena con leche
- Avena con limon
- Cacao
- Caimito
- Cebada
- Cebada con limon
- Cebada con Milca
- Coyolito
- Chia
- Chicha
- Chicha bruja
- Chicha de caña
- Chicha de coyol
- Chicha de jocote
- Chocolate
- Ensalada de fruta
- Espinaca (made with spinach berries)
- Fresco de guayabilla
- Guabul
- Granadilla
- Horchata
- Kola Shaler
- Limonada cimarrona
- Linaza
- Linaza con tamarindo
- Mamey (nothing to do with sapodilla)
- Mamón
- Nancite (yellow cherries drink)
- Naranja con remolachas
- Naranja con zanahorias
- Papalon (beach grape drink)
- Papaturro
- Tiste

== Postres (desserts) ==
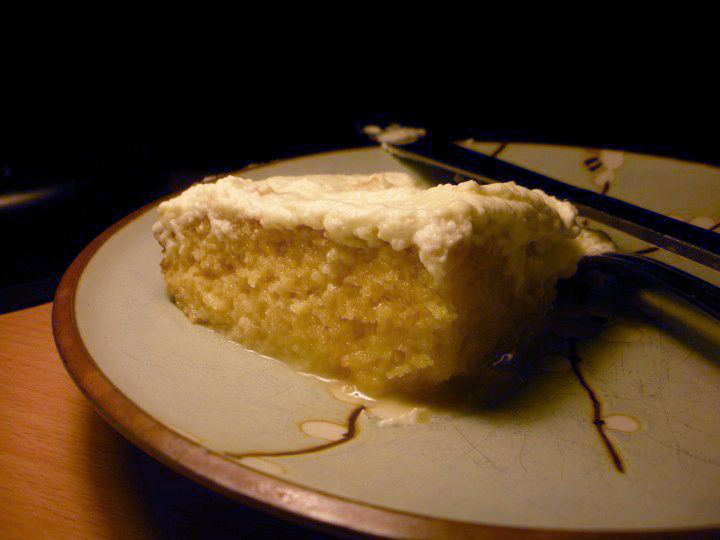
Tres leches cake

- Almendras en miel (en jarabe)
- Almibar o curbaza
- Almibar de toncuá
- Arroz con leche
- Atol
- Atol pujagua
- Atolillo
- Ayote en miel
- Bienmesabe
- Botellitas de miel
- Brujas
- Buñuelos de yuca o platano
- Cajeta de ajonjoli
- Cajeta de coco
- Cajeta de coyol
- Cajeta de leche
- Cajeta de piña
- Cajeta de zapoyol
- Cocadas
- Cosa de horno
- Coyol en miel (en jarabe)
- Crispeta
- Cuznaca
- Chiricaya
- Dulce de leche
- Dulce de limon (cidra)
- Dulce de nancite
- Dulce de naranja
- Dulce de piña
- Dulce de papaya
- Dulce de toronja
- Dulce de remolacha con zanahoria
- Enchiclados
- Espumillas
- Gofio
- Flan
- Gofio con anis
- Grosellas en miel (en jarabe)
- Hicacos en miel (en jarabe)
- Jalea de guayaba
- Jalea de mango
- Jalea de patriotas (bananas)
- Jocotes cocidos
- Leche burra
- Maduro asado
- Maduro en gloria
- Maduro horneado
- Mamones en miel (en jarabe)
- Mazapan
- Melcocha
- Motas de atol
- Nancites cocidos
- Nancites en conserva
- Perrerreque
- Piñonate
- Pio Quinto
- Polvorón
- Raspados
- Requeson
- Sopa borracha
- Suspiros
- Toronja en miel (en jarabe)
- Torta de leche
- Tres leches cake
- Turron

== See also ==
- Latin American cuisine
