= Nacatamal =

Nicaraguan nixtamalized corn dish

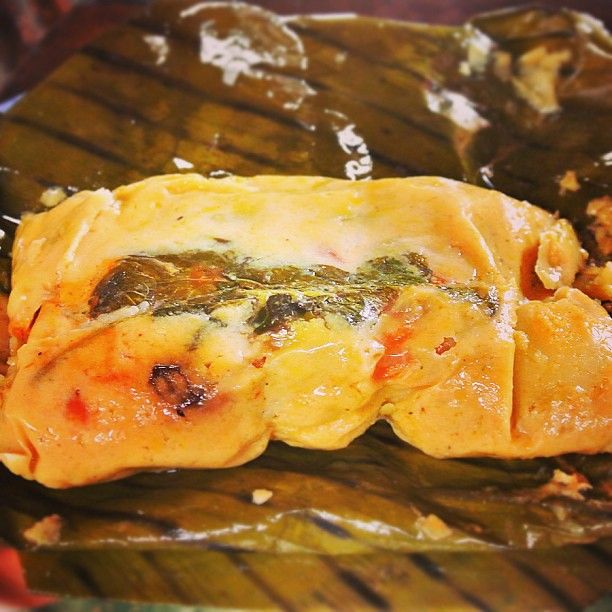
- Nacatamal in Nicaragua being served and ready to eat
- Place of origin: Nicaragua
- Main ingredients: Corn (maize) masa, tomatoes, achiote, chilis, potatoes, banana leaves, Corn husks Fillings; rice and meat (e.g. pork, turkey and chicken)

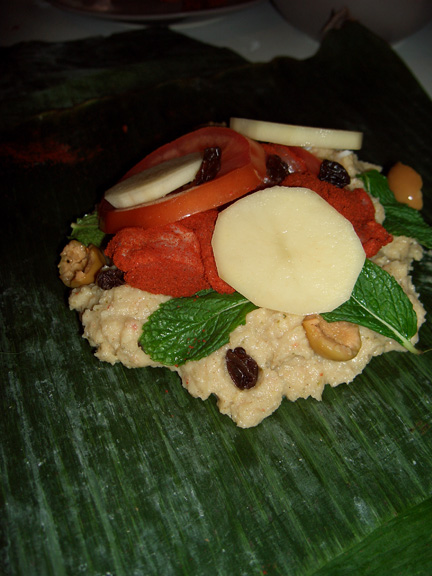
Before rolling: an indent in the masa was filled with rice and seasoned pork, and then covered with potato, tomato, fresh mint, olives and a few raisins.

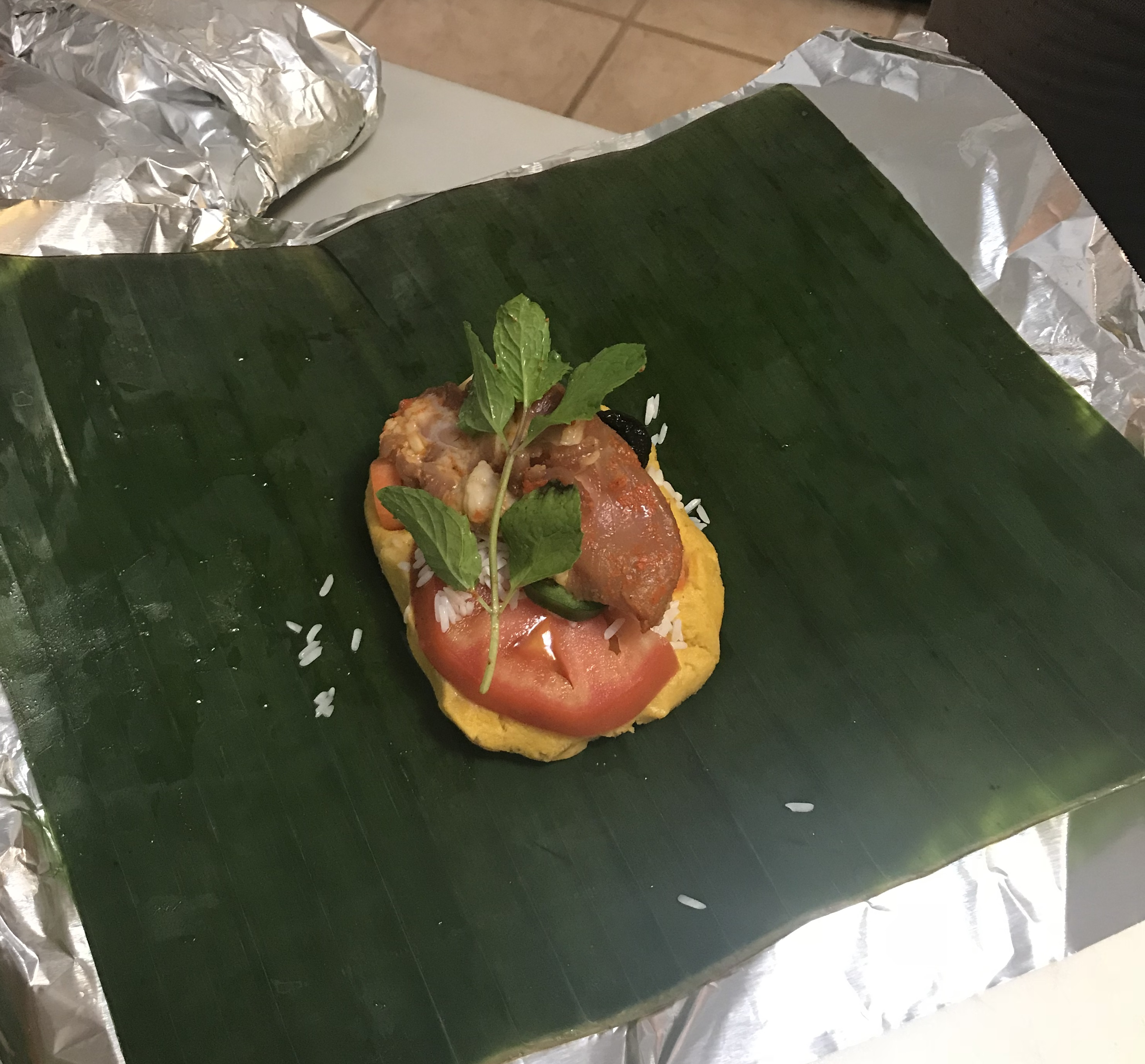
Nacatamal with both banana leaf and aluminum foil wrapping

A nacatamal (Nahuat: Nakatamal, Nakat "meat", tamal "tamale") (Nahuatl: Nacatamal, Nacatl "meat", tamalli "tamale") is a traditional Nicaraguan dish similar to the tamal and to the hallaca. Nacatamales have Mesoamerican roots, and originated from the Nicarao tribes who inhabited western Nicaragua, its name originates from the Nawat language and translates to 'meat tamale'. In the pre-Columbian era, the Nicarao used meats like deer, turkey, and iguana with ingredients such as tomatoes, potatoes, chilis, achiote, and herbs to season and increase the nacatamal's flavor before being wrapped in corn husks and steamed. After Spanish conquest, nacatamales were made with introduced meats like pork and chicken. They also evolved to include flavorful ingredients like onions and banana leaves replaced corn husks. Raisins can also be added, however raisins are optional and not a requirement for nacatamales. The nacatamal is perhaps the most produced within traditional Nicaraguan cuisine and is typically eaten on the weekend, for dinner, or for breakfast; it is usually eaten together with white bread and a caffeinated drink like black coffee, Coca-Cola or Pepsi. It is common to enjoy nacatamales (plural) during special occasions and to invite extended family and neighbors to partake.

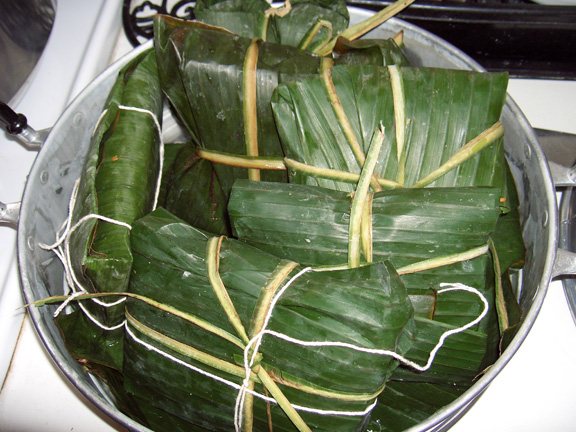
Nacatamales tied in plantain leaves ready to be steamed

== Ingredients ==
A nacatamal is made up of mostly nixtamalized corn masa (a kind of dough traditionally made from a process called nizquezar) and lard, but includes seasonings such as salt and achiote (annatto). This combination is traditionally cooked in a large batch over a wood fire. The result becomes the base for the nacatamal and it is also referred to as masa. This base is ladled onto plantain leaves used for wrapping into large individual portions. The leaves undergo their own preparation separately. Before a nacatamal can be wrapped and brought to the last stage of the cooking process, it must be filled. The filling usually consists of annatto-seasoned pork meat; rice; slices of potatoes, bell peppers, tomatoes, and onions; olives; spearmint sprigs; and chile congo, a very small, egg-shaped chile found in Nicaragua. On occasion, prunes, raisins or capers can be added. The masa and filling are then wrapped in the plantain leaves, tied with a string, and made into pillow-shaped bundles. These nacatamales are then steamed or pressure-cooked for several hours. The entire process is very labor-intensive and it often requires preparation over the course of two days; it may be necessary to involve the whole family to complete it.

Today it is common to wrap nacatamales in both banana leaf and aluminum foil before cooking. Cooking takes up to five hours and at the midway point the nacatamales are turned over to facilitate even cooking.

== Regional variations ==
The ingredients and preparation methods can change depending on the region of Nicaragua. As described in an article published by VICE, some families follow their own traditional recipes, using different ingredients depending on the region.

Nacatamales are traditional in northern Nicaragua, including Matagalpa and Esteli. In Esteli, nacatamales are an important part of local traditions. An article published by TN8 describes a festival where people celebrate this traditional dish. For example, another article from TN8 explains how some nacatamales in Managua are made with potato masa instead of corn masa. Their recipe also includes pork, rice, olives, capers, and vegetables. An article from La Prensa also mentions a type called "nacatamal pindongo," which is made without pork. These are some of the different ways people prepare nacatamales in Nicaragua.

In Leon along the Pacific Coast, nacatamales can be prepared in different ways. A study conducted in Leon compared four nacatamal samples and found differences in their ingredients, including whether they contained bacon. According to an article published by VICE, a family in Leon prepares nacatamales without tomatoes because they follow their traditional recipe. The family explains that tomatoes are more commonly used in southern cities, such as Managua, the capital.

In Granada, the lake side, nacatamales are part of the local cuisine. They can include different fillings, such as raisins olives, and capers. As noted in Revista de Temas Nicaraguenses, these ingredients are used in traditional recipes and can give the dish a mix of sweet and salty flavors.

An article published by TN8 describes a similar dish called "tamuga," which is traditionally prepared in Masatepe, a town in Masaya. Unlike nacatamales, which are made with corn masa and usually contain pork, tamugas are made with rice and beef. They can also include vegetables such as potatoes, tomatoes, onions, and peppers. Tamugas are different from nacatamales, but both share similar preparation methods.

An article published by La Prensa describes a giant nacatamal made in Chinandega in 2016. It was prepared with 20 pounds of corn, 8 pounds of rice, 15 pounds of pork, and 6 pounds of bacon. This shows us some of the different ways people prepare nacatamales and how they can vary in size and the amount of ingredients used.

== See also ==
- List of maize dishes
- Nicaraguan cuisine
- Mesoamerican cuisine
- List of stuffed dishes
