= Vigorón =

Nicaraguan pork and vegetable dish

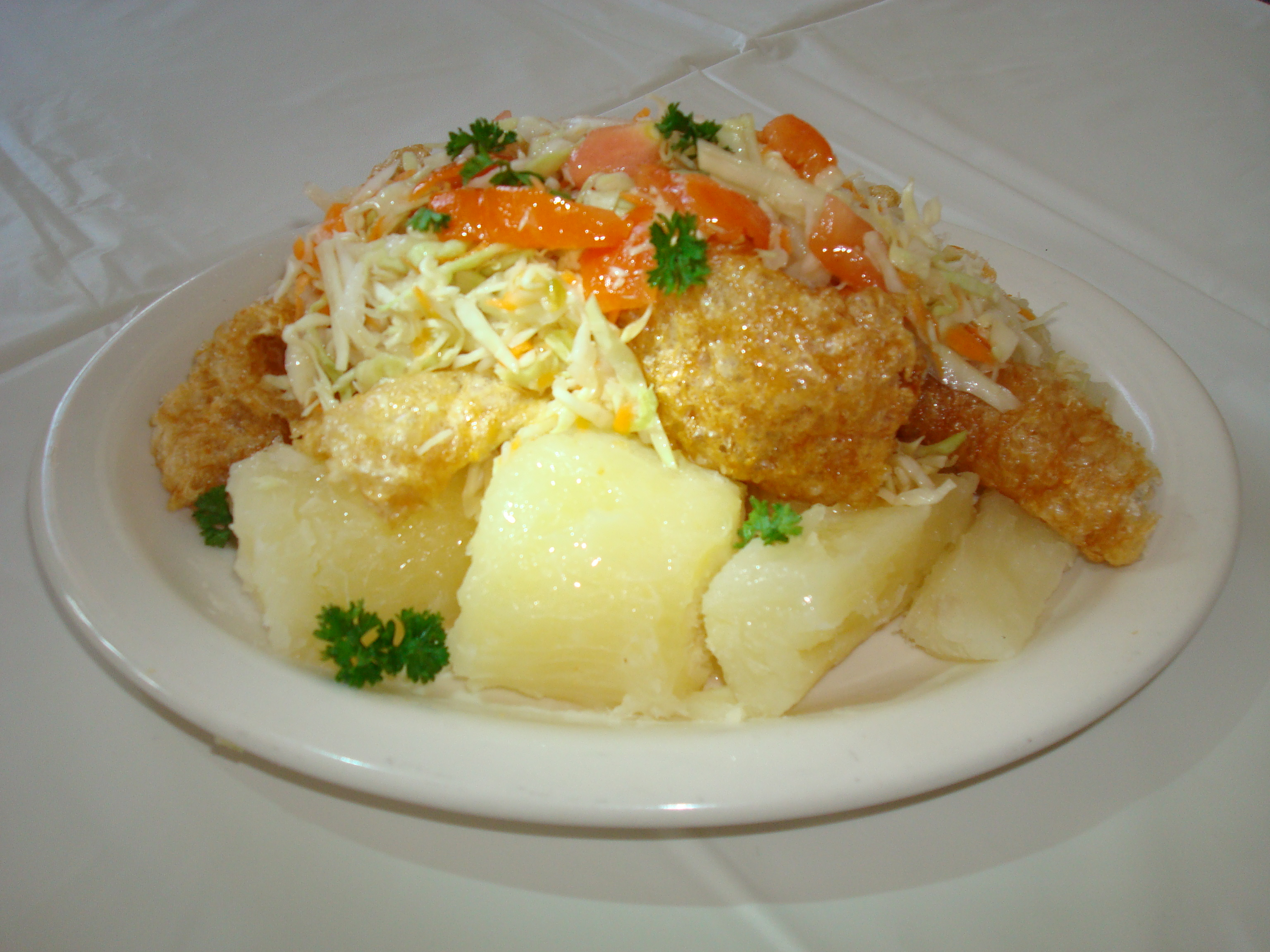
Vigorón

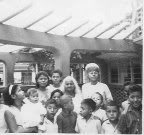
María Luisa Cisneros Lacayo "La Loca"

Vigorón is a traditional Nicaraguan dish. It consists of a cabbage salad, or curtido (chopped cabbage, tomatoes, onions, and chili pepper marinated in vinegar and salt), boiled yuca, and chicharrones (fried pork belly or fried pork rinds), over a banana leaf. This dish is often eaten without utensils, and it is frequently served to visiting family and guests, as it is generally easily and quickly prepared.

Dr. Alejandro Barberena Pérez, in his 1971 book Granada, stated that María Luisa Cisneros Lacayo, "La Loca", developed the recipe in 1914 in Granada, Nicaragua, and she named the dish "Vigoron" after seeing a poster advertising a then-contemporary medicinal tonic by that name (USPTO Serial 71068023).

Many familial and cultural variants have arisen, especially in the variations of curtido. In addition, variants of vigorón exist in other surrounding countries, notably Costa Rica, where the dish is very common.

Vaho, a dish very similar to vigorón, is also a traditional Nicaraguan dish. However, a distinction is made in the manner of cooking: vaho is pressure-cooked (typically brisket), vigorón is not. Vaho also contains green and ripe plantains, whereas vigorón does not.
