= Pio Quinto =

Desert in Nicaragua

- Course: Dessert
- Place of origin: Nicaragua
- Main ingredients: Cake, rum, custard, cinnamon

Pio Quinto is a Nicaraguan dessert consisting of cake drenched in rum, topped with a custard, and dusted with cinnamon. Some recipes also include rum soaked prunes or raisins. Pio Quinto is eaten after meals or during Christmas time. The cake is believed to have been named after Pope Pius V, but the connection is unknown.
