= Gallina rellena =

Non Vegetarian Nicaraguan Dish

Gallina rellena is a traditional Nicaraguan dish. It is usually served during Christmas and New Year with family and friends. It consists of chicken, pork, carrots, potatoes, chayote, raisins, vinegar and tomato sauce. It is usually served with bread on the side.
