= Indio viejo =

Type of stew

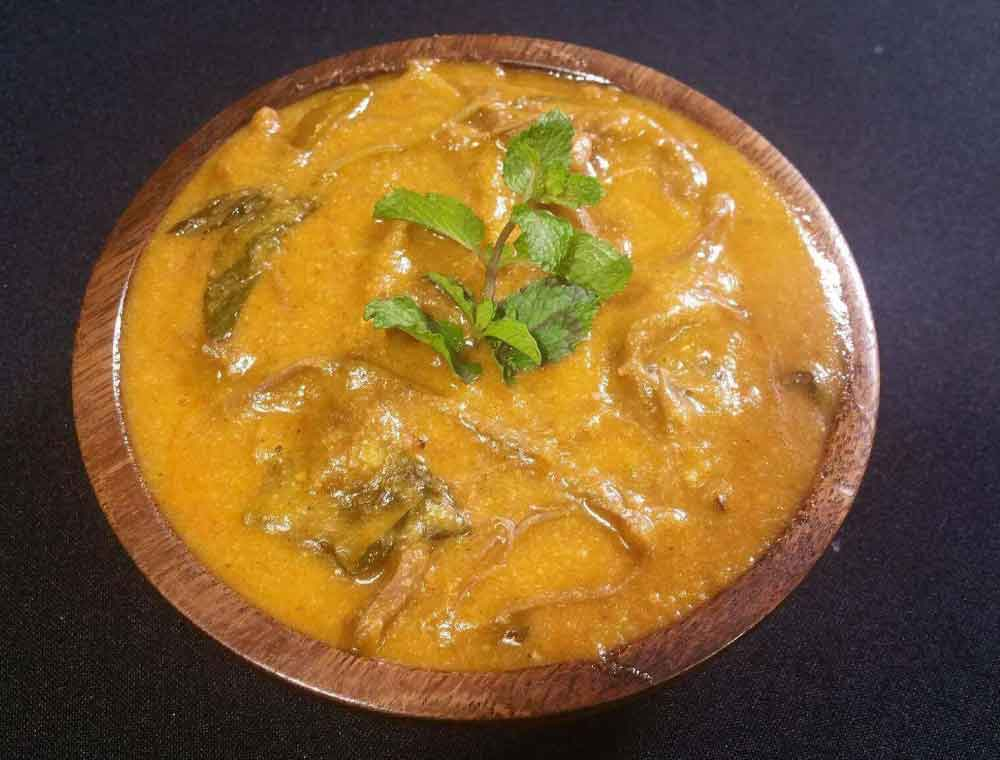
Bowl of Indio viejo, or Nicaraguan maize soup/stew

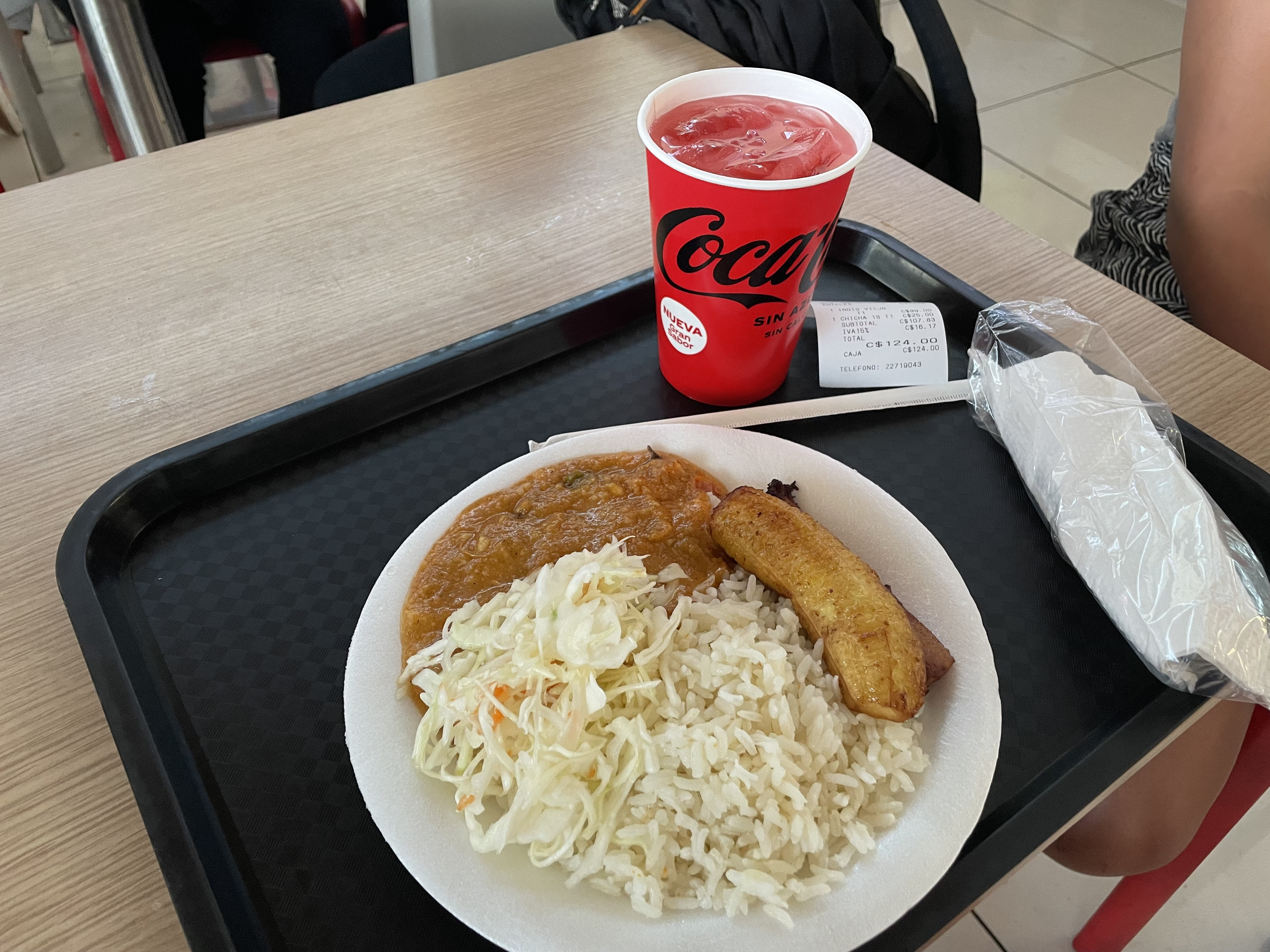
Indio viejo served with plantains, rice, ensalada de repollo, and chicha

Indio viejo ("old Indian") is a traditional dish from Nicaragua dating back to the pre-Columbian era. It is a stew or thick soup made out of maize mixed with tomatoes, achiote, onions, garlic, shredded meat, and herbs. Indio viejo originated from Nicarao natives living on Ometepe Island, who before Spanish arrival, made the dish with meats and ingredients that are native to the region, such as maize, tomatoes, achiote, and herbs, along with deer, turkey, or iguana meat. The dish is one of the oldest and most established in Nicaraguan cuisine. It is similar to a porridge. It was also eaten extensively during the colonial era and a mortar was used to prepare the dish.
