= Níspero =

Níspero, nipero, nêspera and mespel are terms referring to certain fruit-bearing trees, or to their fruit in particular:

- Common medlar (Mespilus germanica), the origin of the term (called Mispel in many Germanic languages, mispeli in Finnish, nespolo in Italian, etc.)
- Loquat (Eriobotrya japonica), widely traded under these names today, in particular in temperate countries
- Sapodilla (Manilkara zapota), often known by these terms in tropical countries in Latin America
- Manilkara huberi a tropical fruit
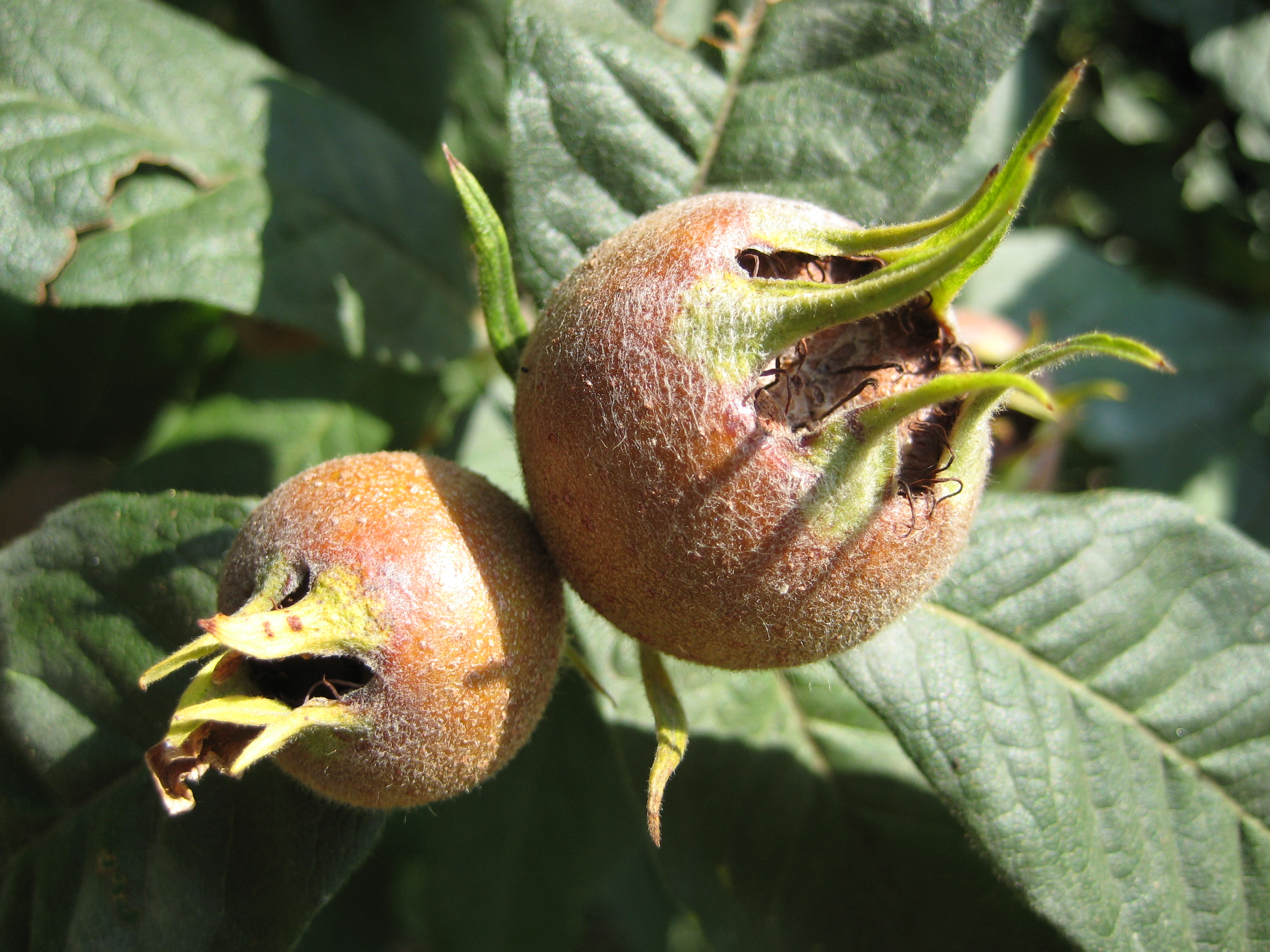
Mespilus germanica fruit

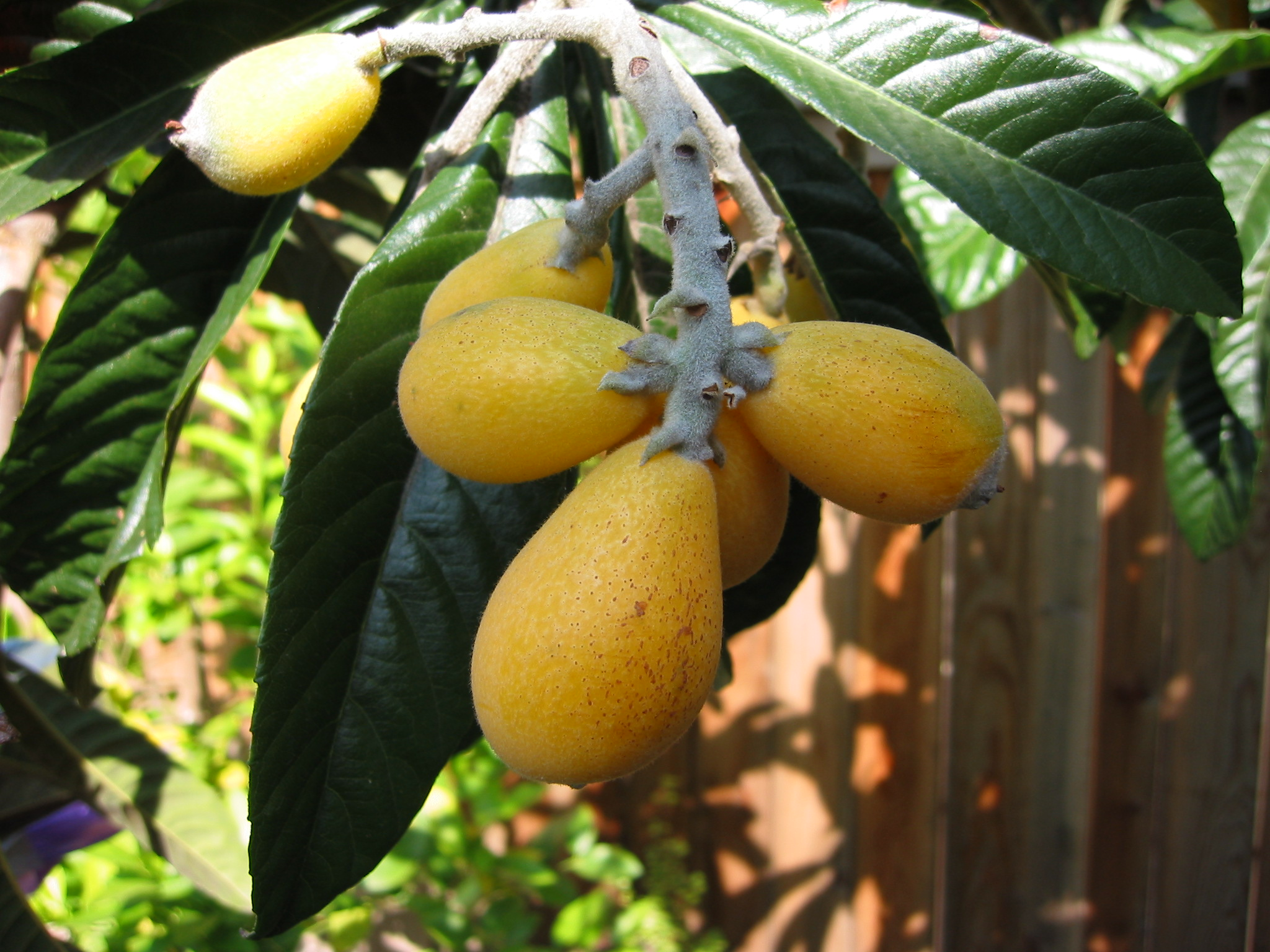
Eriobotrya japonica fruit

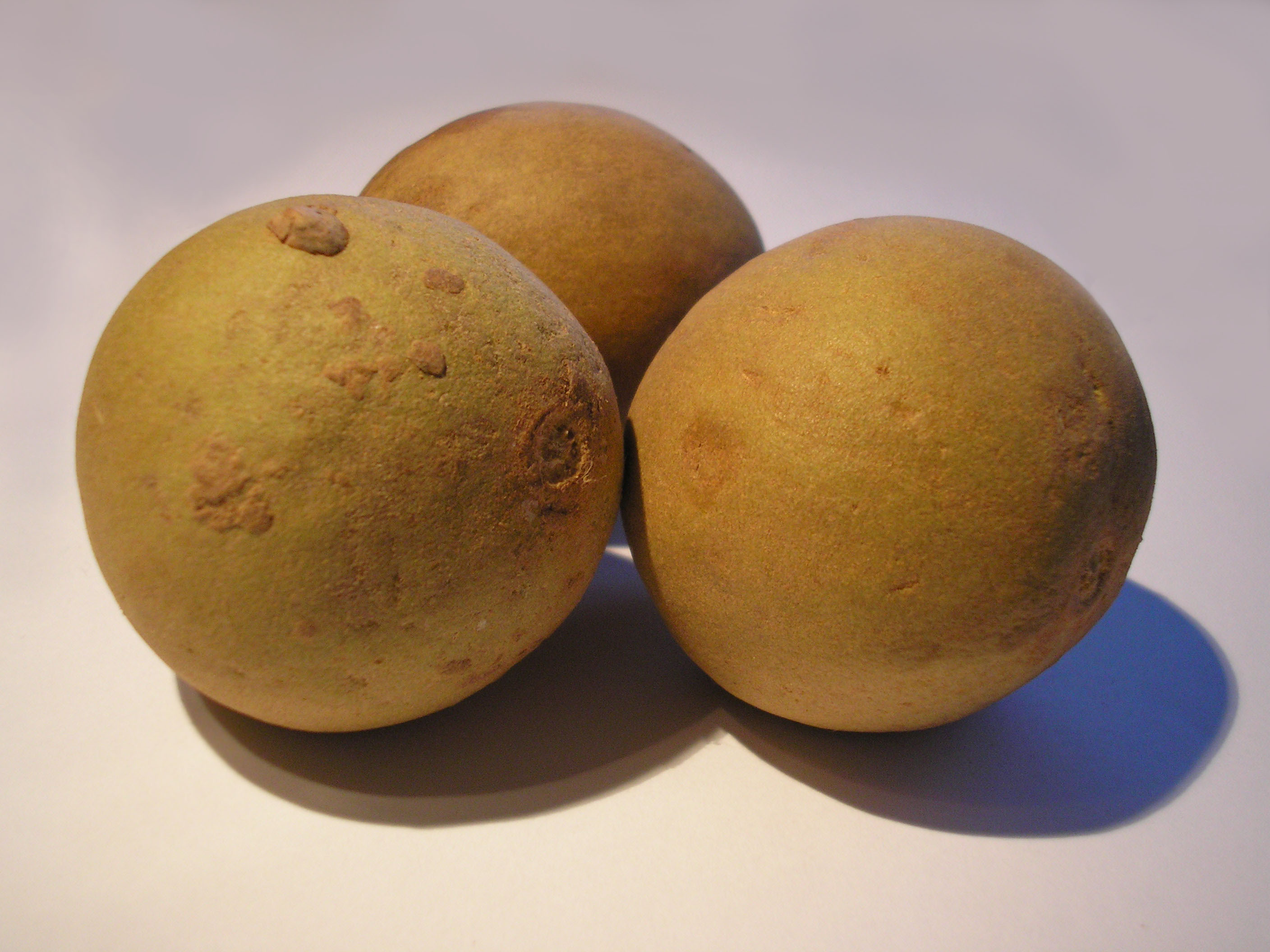
Manilkara zapota fruit
