= Iguana meat =

Iguana as food

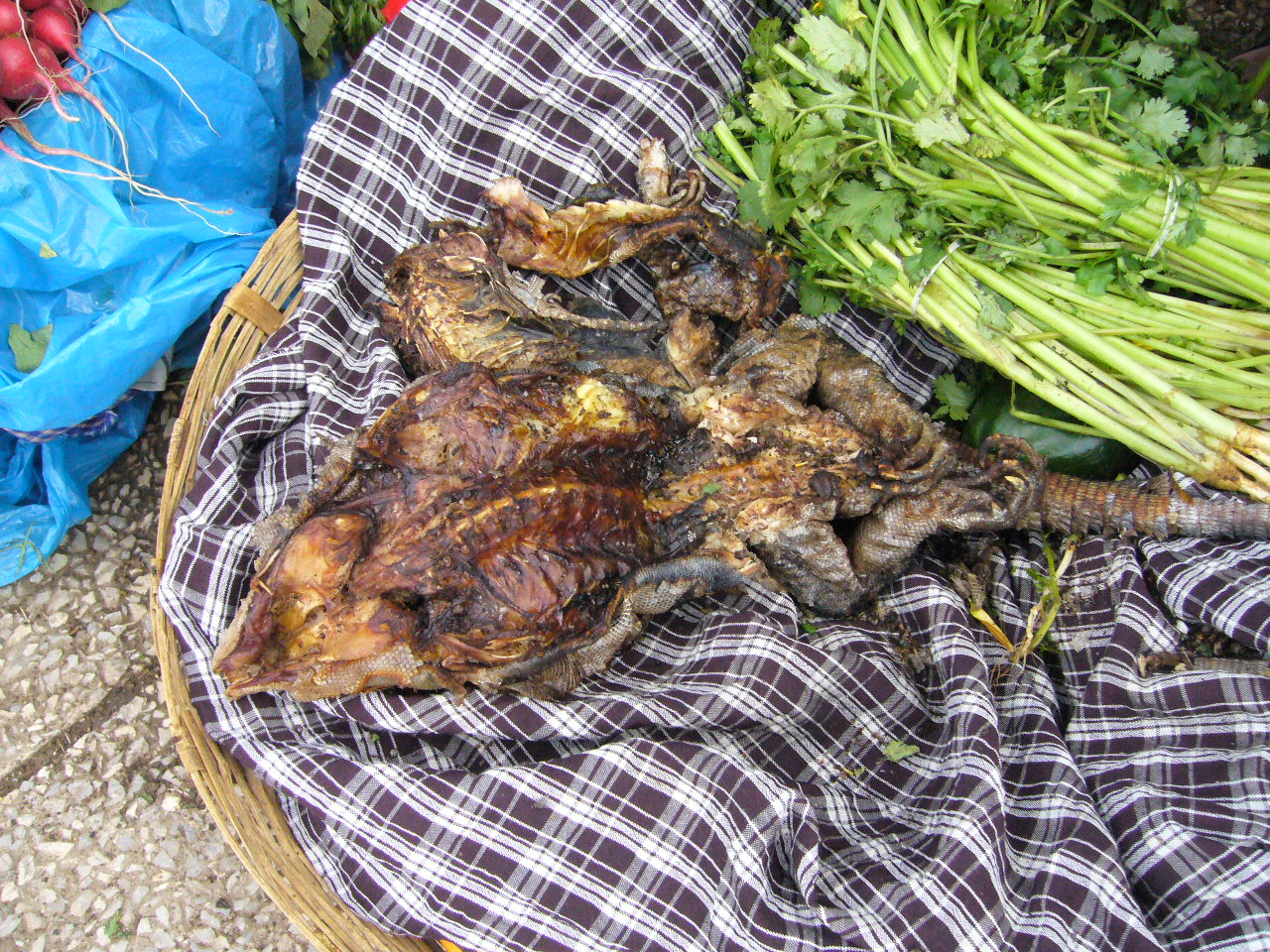
Roasted iguana at a market in San Juan Sacatepequez, Guatemala

Iguana meat has historically been important in the culinary traditions of Mexico and Central America, particularly in the states of Jalisco, Michoacán and Colima. In Bernardino de Sahagún's history of colonial Mexico, he mentions the iguana as a traditional food throughout Western Mexico and describes it as good to eat when properly prepared. Iguana meat is legal in the United States of America and several other countries; however, import is restricted due to CITES conventions.

There has been a marked preference for the green iguana (Iguana iguana) over the black iguana (Ctenosaura pectinata) in the region, though both are eaten. Common recipes for the iguana include stews (guisado), pozole, birria, roasted in tacos and flautas.

People in parts of South Florida have started cooking iguana meat after the Florida Wildlife Agency encouraged residents to kill green iguanas on their own property. In Puerto Rico, where iguanas are an invasive species, there have been efforts to promote iguana consumption.

== Bibliography ==
- Martinez Campos, Gabriel - Recetario Colimense de la iguana - Mexico (2004) Conaculta
- Sahagún, Br. Bernardino de - Historia General de las cosas de la Nueva España - Mexico (1975) Ed Porrúa
- Fisher, Eliza - "Customs and Border Protection Confiscates Iguana Meat Near San Diego" - Huffington Post, 08/15/2011
