= Vaho =

Traditional Nicaraguan dish

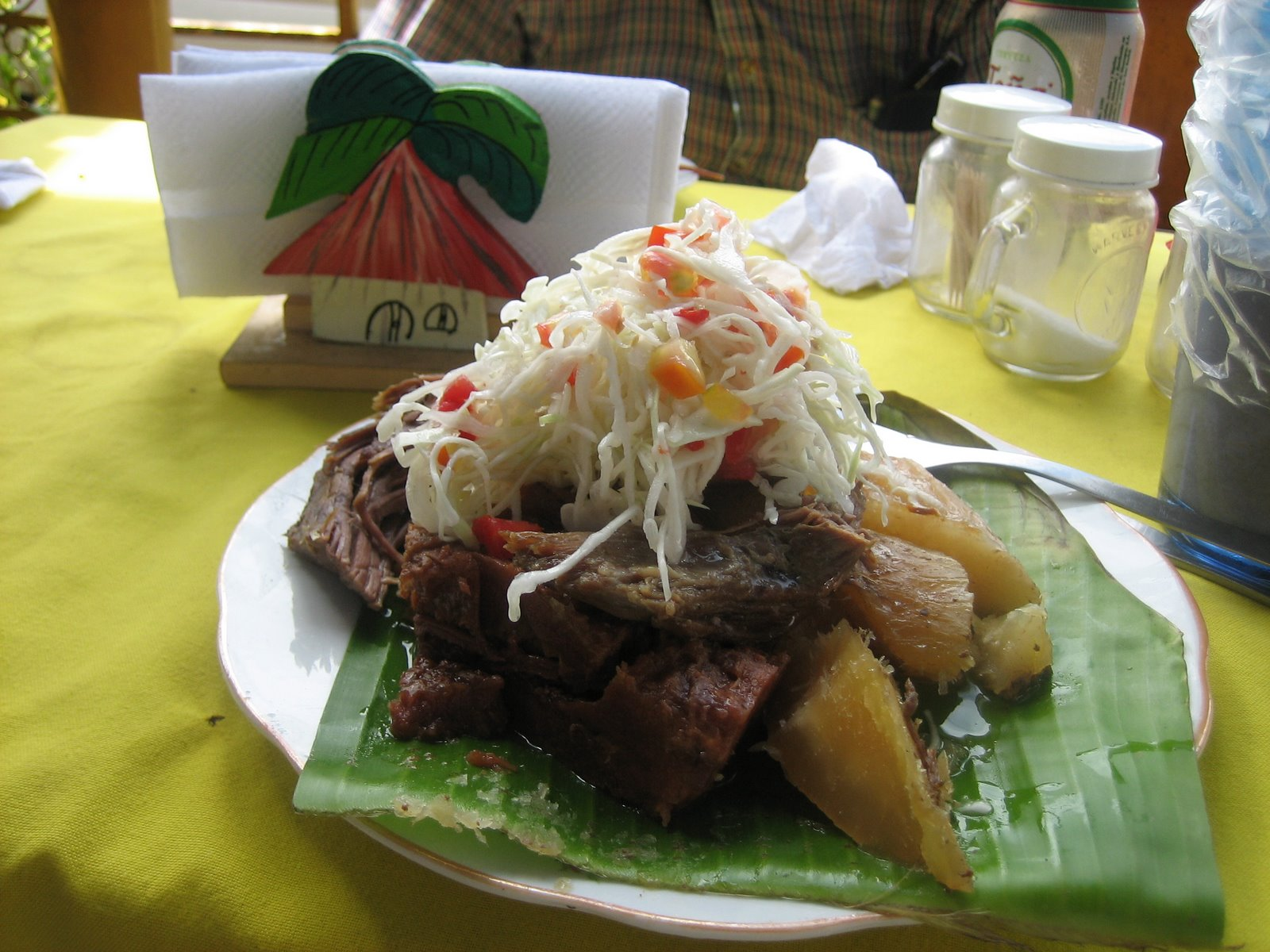
A typical Nicaraguan baho

Vaho or baho (both [ˈbao]) is a mix of meat, green plantains and yuca cooked in and served on banana leaves. It is a traditional Nicaraguan dish originated from the mix of cultures between the indigenous, mestizos and Afro-Nicaraguans of the country.

In Nicaraguan Spanish and some other dialects, the name is pronounced with /x/ between vowels as [ˈbaxo]. There is some controversy as to whether the correct spelling is vaho, baho, vajo or bajo.

Vaho is served with ensalada de repollo, a cabbage and tomato salad made with vinegar and lemon/lime juice. The salad tops the meat, yuca and plantains. The meat used to make this dish is typically beef brisket.

The dish requires long cooking. For some families, it is a traditional Sunday dish. It is also served in many restaurants.
