= Brenntar =

Swabian staple dish

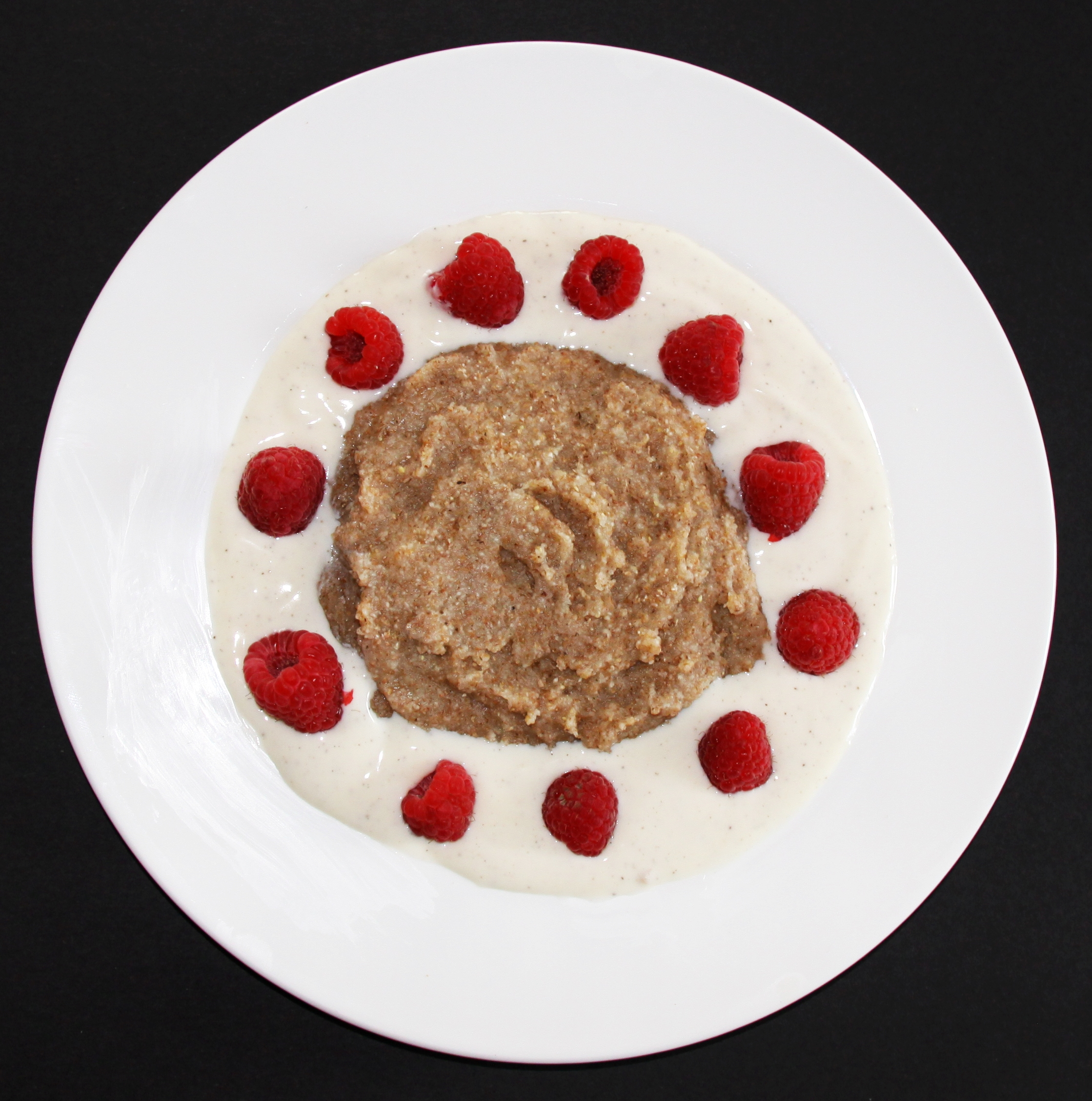
- Brenntar with vanilla sauce
- Type: Porridge
- Place of origin: Germany (Swabia)
- Main ingredients: Flour (usually spelt)

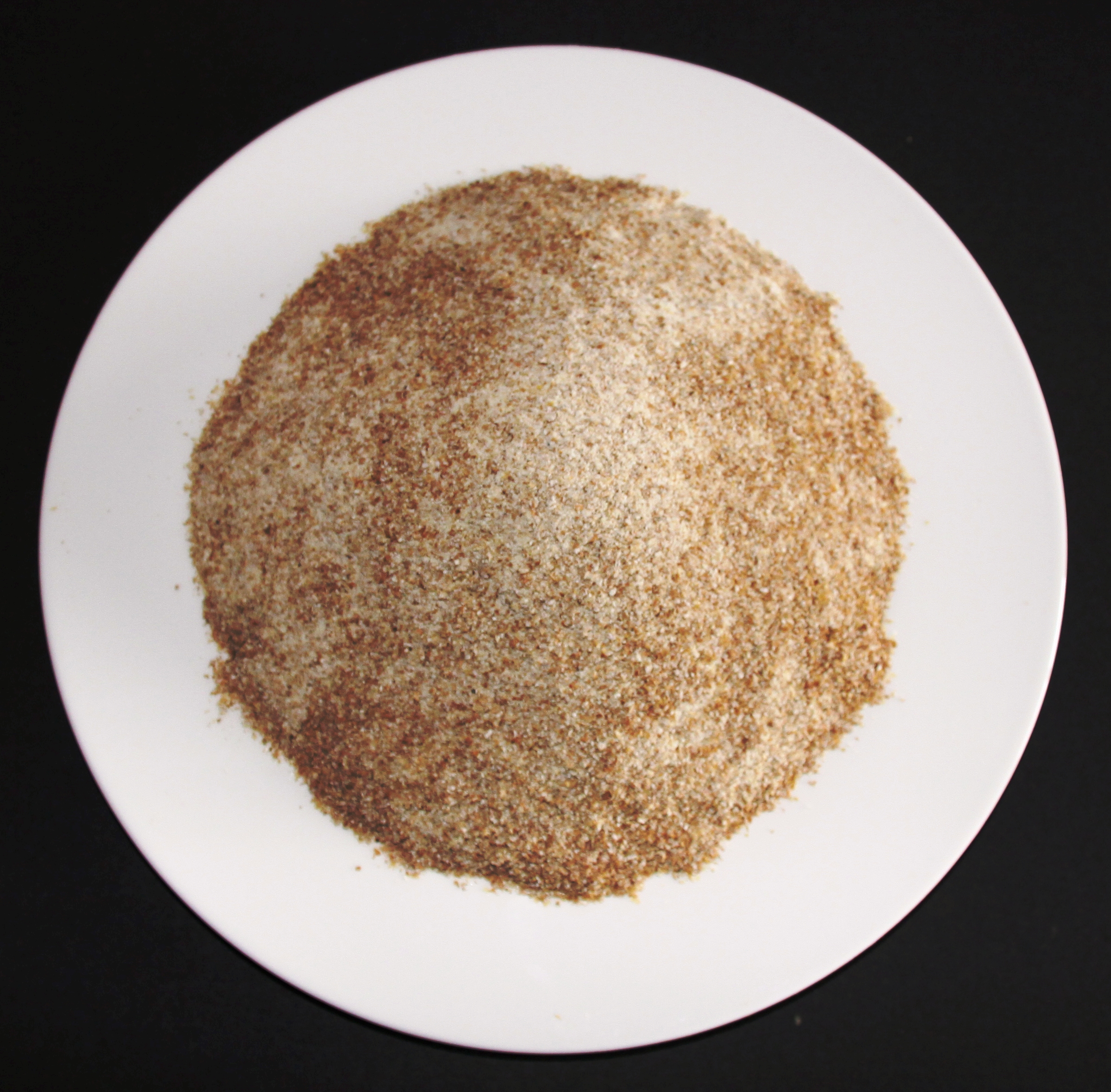
Musmehl, main ingredient of Brenntar

Brenntar or Habermus or Schwarzer Brei is a Swabian staple foodstuff, particularly prominent in the Swabian Jura and in the Allgäu. It is made of roasted flour, usually spelt flour or oat flour. This kiln-dried flour is called Musmehl. It is usually cooked like a porridge with water and milk.

The name Brenntar means "burned porridge", Habermus means "oat porridge", and Schwarzer Brei means "black porridge". If roasted correctly, however, Brenntar is brown, but if roasted for too long in the drying kiln it can turn black.

== History ==
It is written in the Schwäbisches Wörterbuch that in 1540 the population on the Swabian Jura was saved from starvation by Brenntar and Hildegard of Bingen recommended Habermus for a healthy living.

In the last decades, Brenntar had almost fallen into oblivion, but was rediscovered in the trend of conscious nutrition.

Nowadays, Brenntar and the Musmehl have been included in the Ark of Taste, Germany, as "almost forgotten regional-type food" by the Slow Food Deutschland Organization.

== Preparation ==
As a former convenience food used on a daily basis, Brenntar is quite simple to prepare. Originally the Musmehl was cooked in water only, spiced with salt. Today, there are different recipes for Habermus, for example, mixed with vegetables or sweetened with fruit.

== See also ==
- Parched grain
- Gofio
- Kama
- Máchica
- Pinole
- Tsampa
- List of porridges
