= Ecuadorian cuisine =

Culinary traditions of Ecuador

Ecuadorian cuisine is diverse, varying with altitude and associated agricultural conditions. Ecuadorian cuisine is an amalgamation of Spanish, Inca, and Amazonian cuisines and to a lesser degree Italian, Lebanese, African, Scandinavian, German, English, and Chinese. Beef, chicken, and seafood are popular in the coastal regions, especially ceviche, and are typically served with carbohydrate-rich foods, such as rice accompanied with lentils, pasta, or plantain. In the mountainous regions pork, chicken, beef and cuy (guinea pig) are popular and are often served with rice, maize, or potatoes. A popular street food in mountainous regions is Hornado (roasted pig). Some examples of Ecuadorian cuisine in general include patacones (green plantain slices fried in oil, mashed up, and then refried), llapingachos (a pan-seared potato ball), and seco de chivo (a type of stew made from goat). A wide variety of fresh fruit is available, particularly at lower altitudes, including granadilla, passion fruit, naranjilla, several types of banana, uvilla, taxo, and tree tomato.

The food is somewhat different in the southern mountainous areas, featuring typical Loja Province food such as repe, a soup prepared with green bananas; cecina, roasted pork; and miel con quesillo, or "cuajada", as dessert. In the rainforest, a dietary staple is the yuca, elsewhere called cassava. The starchy root is peeled and boiled, fried, or used in a variety of other dishes. Across the nation it is also used as a bread, pan de yuca, which is analogous to the Brazilian pão de queijo and often consumed alongside different types of drinkable yogurt. Many fruits are available in this region, including bananas, tree-grapes, and peach palms.

== Typical meal ==
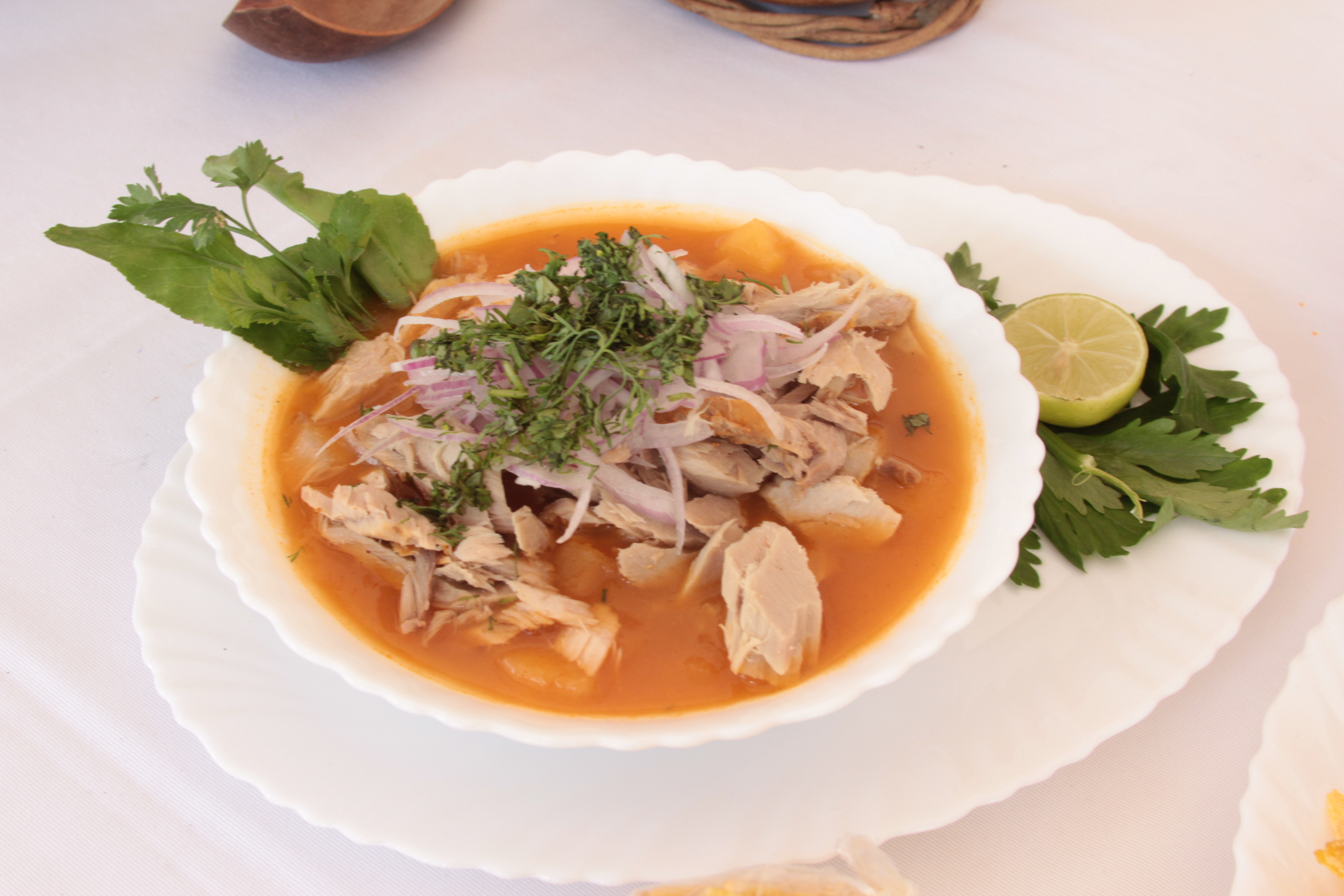
Encebollado

Most regions in Ecuador follow the traditional three-course meal of sopa/soup and segundo/second dish which includes rice or pasta and a protein such as beef, poultry, pig or fish. Then dessert and a coffee are customary. Dinner is usually lighter and sometimes just coffee or agua de remedio/herbal tea with bread.

For the most part, Ecuador is known not only for its bananas, and all the dishes made from them, but for its starch consumption of products like potato, bread, pasta, rice, and yuca. Traditionally any of these ingredients can be found in either the soup or the rice platter that may be served.

In a 2023 study, the most consumed Ecuadorian dishes were found to be encebollado, ceviche and hornado. Also, small variations were found among demographics, except for the representations between the Coast and Highland regions which had low correlation.

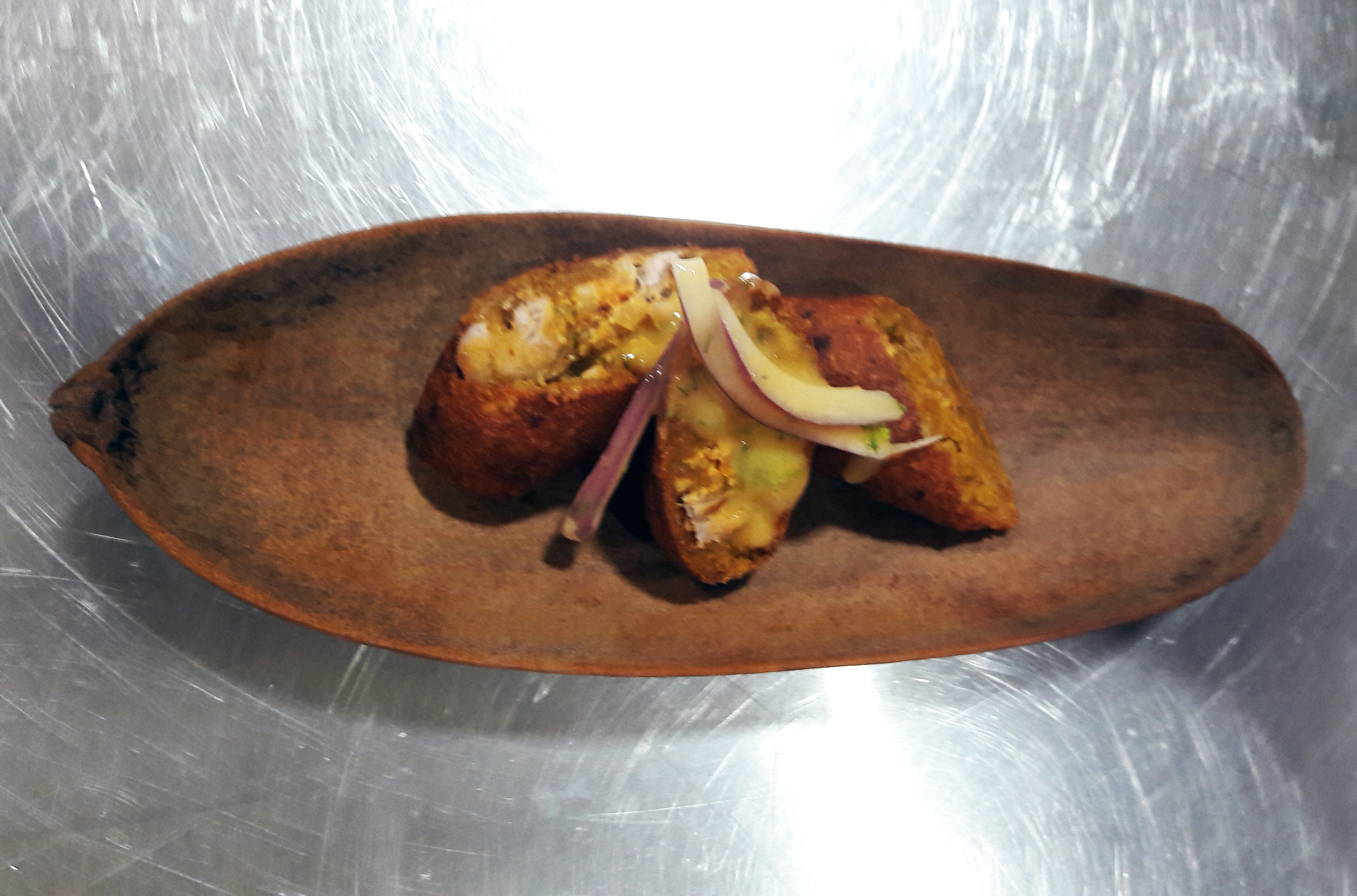
Corviche, dough of grated green plantain, peanuts, and a vegetable sofrito, filled with pieces of fish, and then fried.

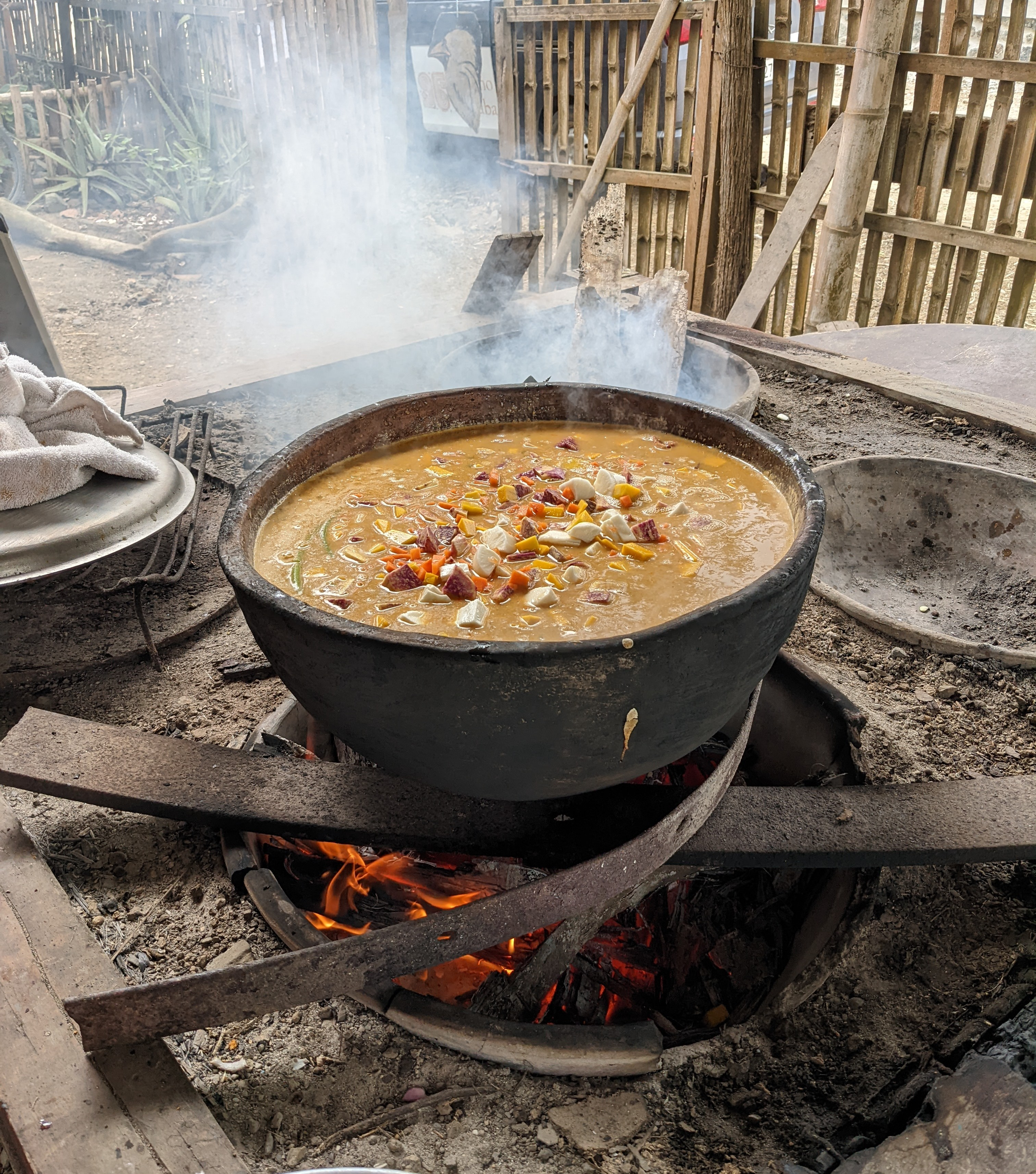
Viche, soup made with fish, peanuts, yuca, sweet plantains, corn, and other vegetables and spices.

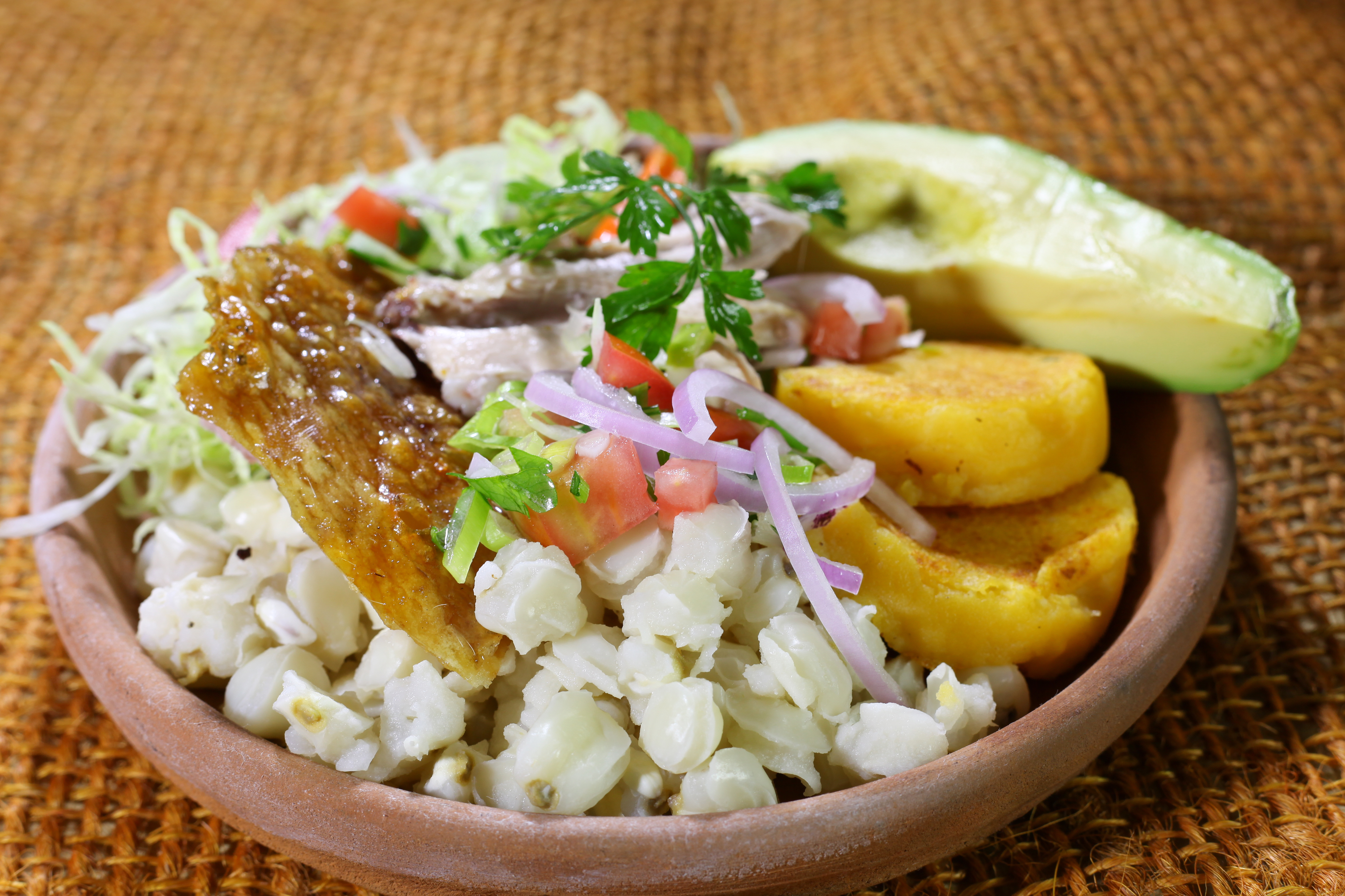
Hornado, slow roasted pork dish cooked in a marinade of beer, garlic, cumin and achiote

== Desserts ==
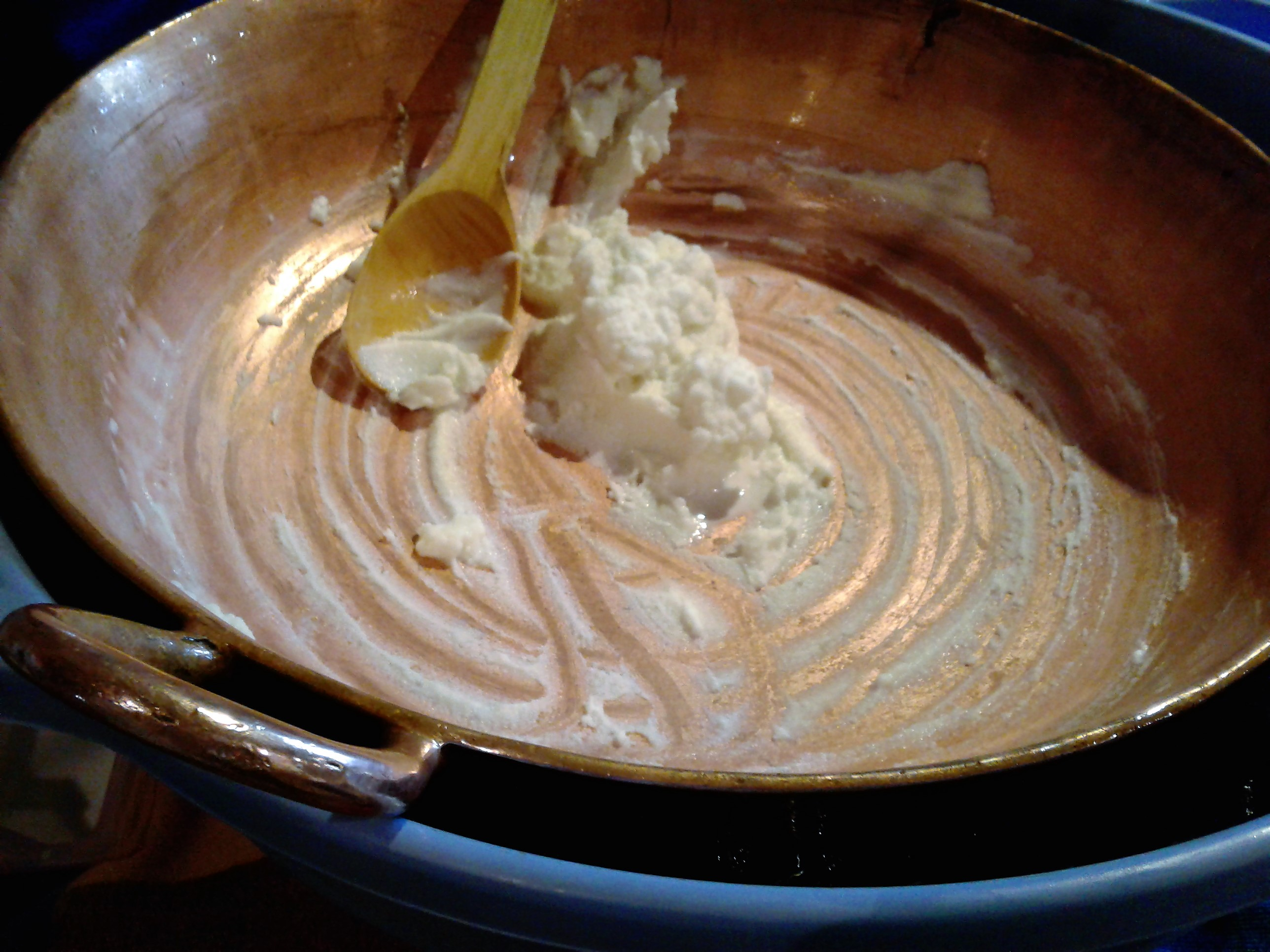
Helado de Paila (pan ice cream)

Arroz con leche (rice pudding): Another dessert originally from Spain that can be found in various varieties throughout Latin America. Arroz con leche is one of the more common desserts found in homes and restaurants of modern-day Ecuador. It consists primarily of cooked rice, cinnamon/nutmeg, raisins, and milk.

Helados de Paila (ice cream): Helado de paila is a sorbet-like specialty that hails from Ibarra. It comes in an array of flavors, and it is made with fruit juice, ice, sugar, and sometimes fruits. All the ingredients are traditionally churned by hand inside a large bronze or copper pot (paila) that is placed on ice. It is said that this frozen treat was initially made with the snow from the glacier on top of the Imbabura volcano. Allegedly, Rosalía Suárez first collected the ice, and her descendants still keep the tradition alive and run an ice cream shop in Ibarra.

Pristiños and buñuelos are two distinct, yet related, fried dough desserts popular in Ecuador. Both are typically served warm, often drizzled with a sweet panela (unrefined whole cane sugar) syrup known as miel de panela. Pristiños are characterized by their delicate, crispy, ribbon-like or spiral shape, often dusted with sugar and cinnamon. Buñuelos, on the other hand, are soft, often irregularly shaped fritters, sometimes incorporating cheese or other ingredients into the dough, giving them a more substantial and sometimes savory-sweet profile. While both are especially eaten during festive seasons like Christmas and Holy Week, they are available year-round in bakeries and traditional food stalls across the country.

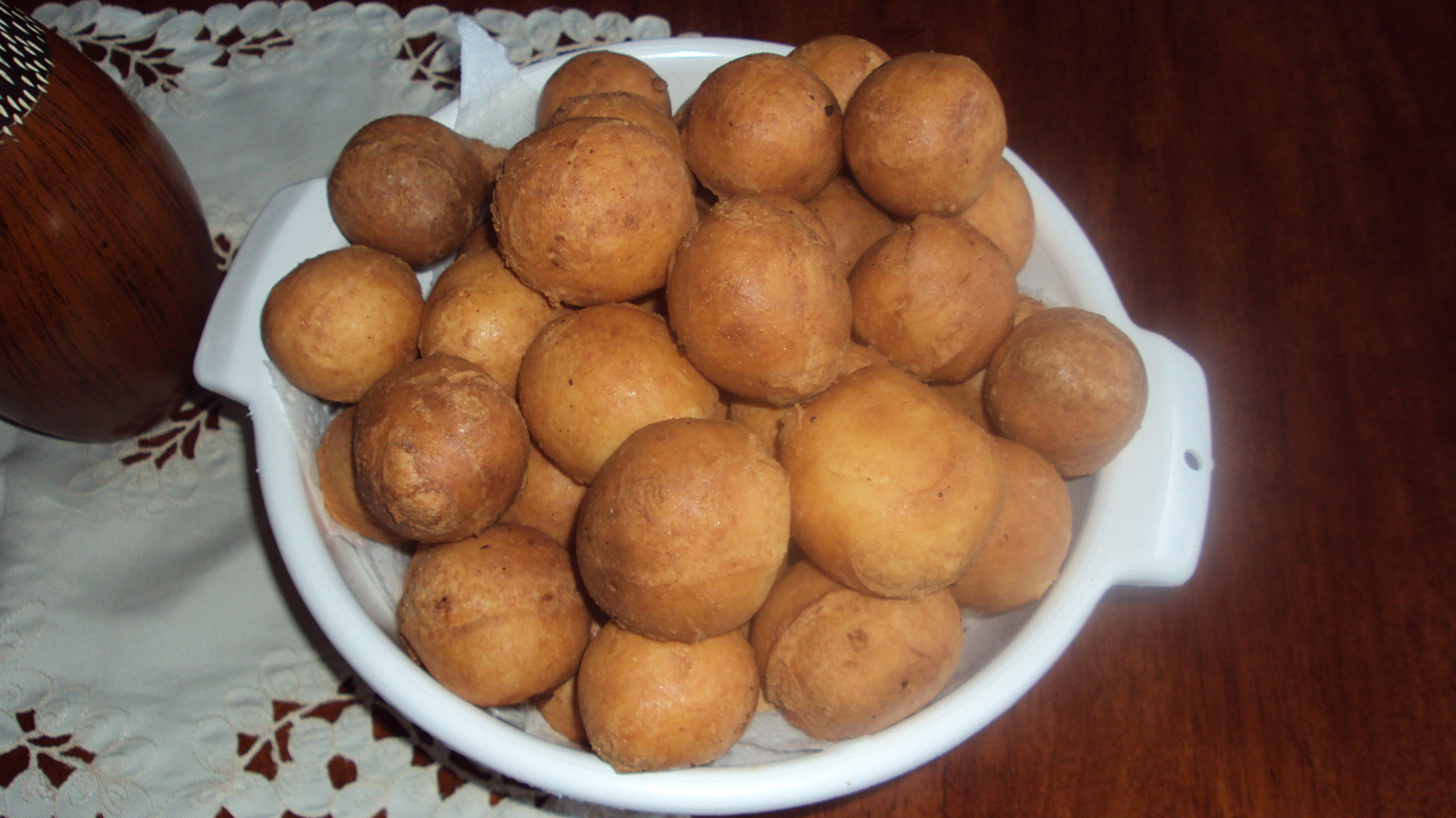
Buñuelos

Panetón or Panettone: is a type of sweet bread with dried fruit. It was popularized by Italian immigrants that arrived in the country in the late 1800s. It is usually served for breakfast around Christmas with a cup of hot chocolate. They used to come in big boxes only with huge panetóns inside but now they also sell personal portions. Because Christmas is the hottest time of year, people often replace the hot chocolate with coffee or a drink that's served cold.

Flan: Is a popular custard dessert with a layer of clear caramel sauce.

Alfajores is a dessert found in virtually all of Spain's former colonies. It is derived from the versions popular in Spain during the colonial period. The original Spanish recipes, however, have been modified. The basic recipe uses a base mix of flour, margarine, and powdered sugar, which is oven baked. Alfajores consist of two or more layers of this baked pastry, and is usually filled with dulce de leche (a caramel-colored, sweet, creamy filling made with milk and sugar)

Turrones (or nougat) is another originally Spanish dessert.

== Beverages and Drinks ==
Aguardiente, a sugarcane-based spirit, is probably the most popular national alcohol. Important brands of aguardiente are Caña Manaba, Zhumir, Cantaclaro, Pájaro Azul, Norteño, and Trópico Seco. Since sugar cane is the base of the alcoholic drinks, rum is also highly popular with local brands like Rum San Miguel or Ron pon pon. During the holidays of Quito, canelazo is a popular drink made from aguardiente.

Drinkable yogurt, available in many fruit flavors, is popular and is often consumed with pan de yuca (a puffy yet gooey bread roll made from cassava flour eaten hot). One traditional non-alcoholic beverage is pinol, made using máchica (toasted barley flour), panela (unrefined sugar), and spices. Another traditional non-alcoholic beverage is colada morada, which is made with black corn flour, sweetened with panela, and flavored with fresh fruit, herbs and spices.

Fioravanti is a fruit-flavored, carbonated soft drink first sold in 1878 in Ecuador. It is notable for being one of the first soft drinks commercially sold. In 1991, it was acquired by The Coca-Cola Company.

Güitig is a mineral water widely consumed around the country at times supplanting tap water as the drink of choice.

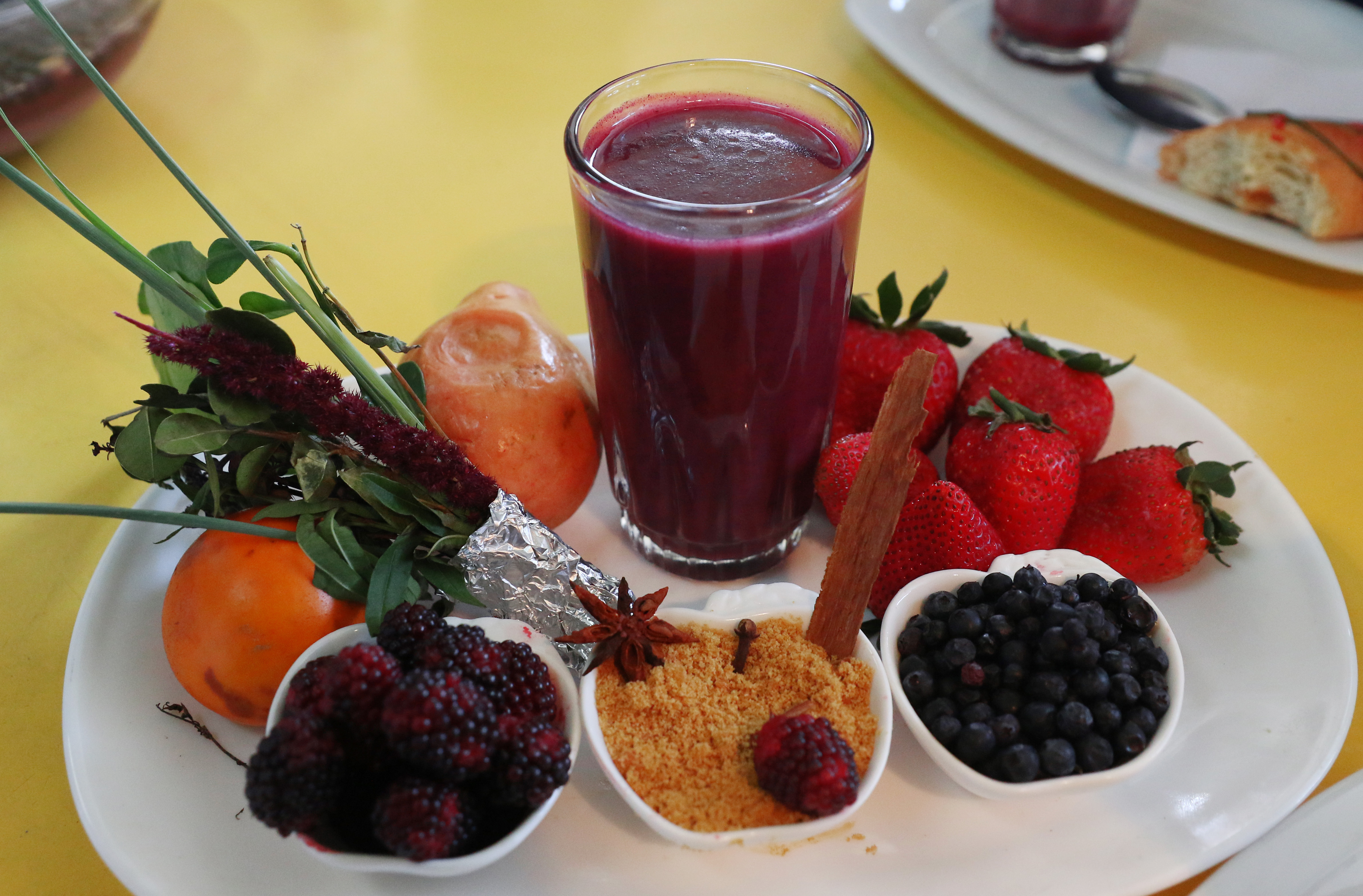
Colada morada

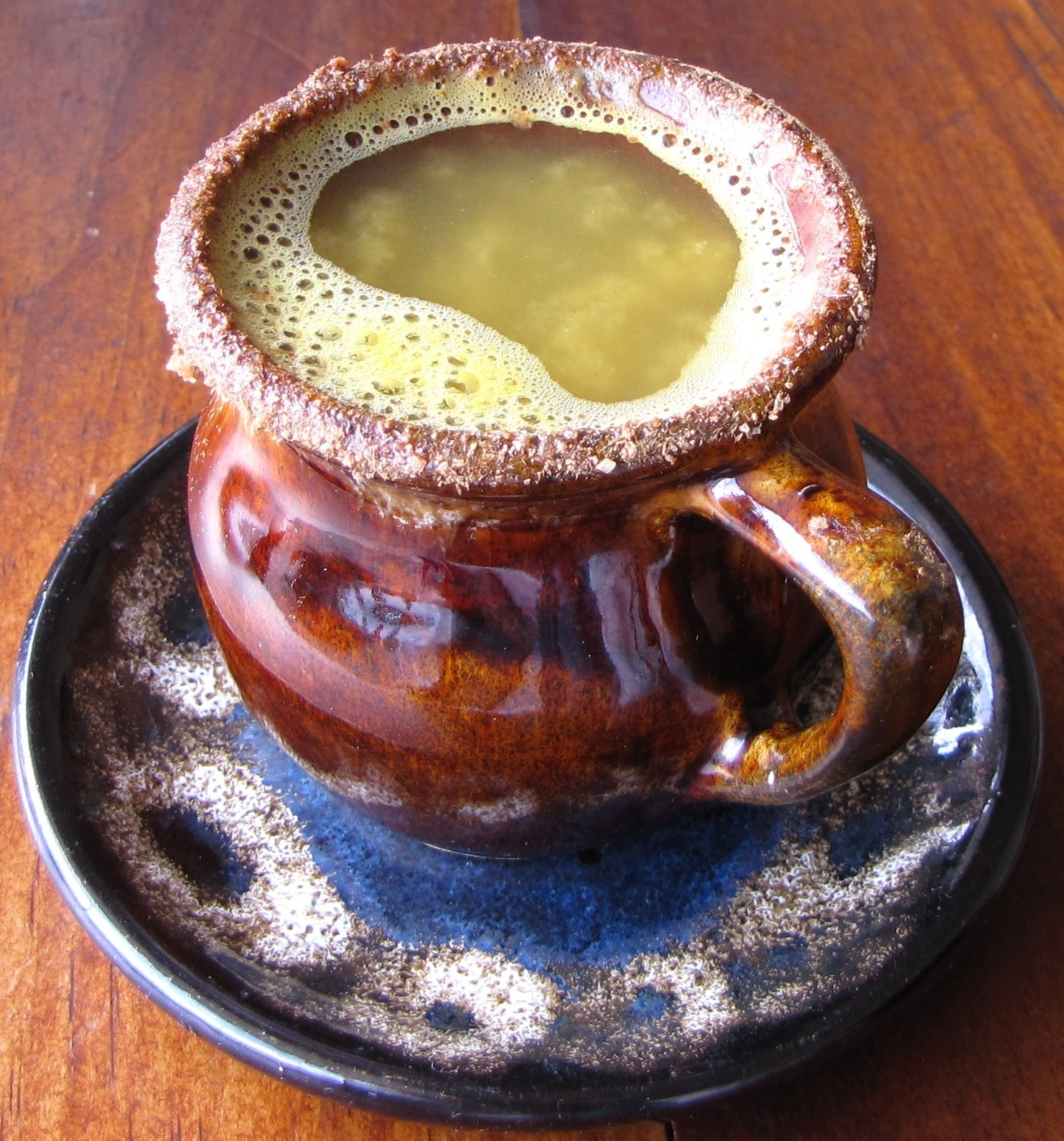
Canelazo

== Influences ==
=== Catholic church ===
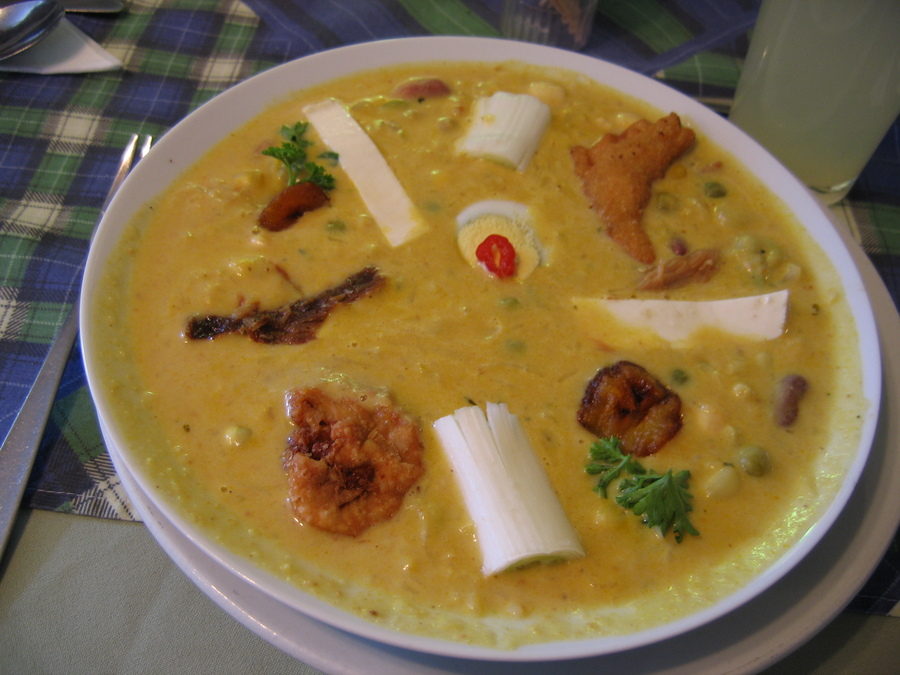
A bowl of fanesca, a traditional soup of Ecuador served around Easter, served in Quito, Ecuador

Besides the regions, there are several typical Ecuadorian dishes consumed on special occasions. Fanesca, a fish soup including several types of beans, lentils, and corn, is often eaten during Lent and Easter and is traditionally served all over Ecuador. During the week before the commemoration of the deceased or All Souls' Day, the fruit beverage colada morada is typical, accompanied by a "guagua de pan" which is stuffed bread shaped like children.

=== Chinese influence ===
Chifa, from the Mandarin words 吃饭 (chī fàn, lit. 'to eat rice'), is the Ecuadorian term for Ecuadorian-Chinese food (or for an Ecuadorian-Chinese fusion restaurant). Because many Chinese ingredients are hard to find in Ecuador, the Chinese modified their cuisine and incorporated many Ecuadorian elements (mainly Spanish, Indigenous, and African) into their cuisine.

=== Middle Eastern influence ===
Since 1875, there has been a constant flow of Lebanese immigrants to Ecuador, first fleeing the Ottoman Empire, and then the aftermath of World War I and II. By 1986, there were 97,500 Lebanese immigrants in Ecuador. Shawarma restaurants have become increasingly popular, presenting another instance of fusion cuisine. Since many of the ingredients in Middle Eastern cuisine cannot be found in the country, Lebanese immigrants have made replacements with native ingredients.

== See also ==
- List of Ecuadorian dishes and foods
