= Pinolero =

Colloquial term for a Nicaraguan

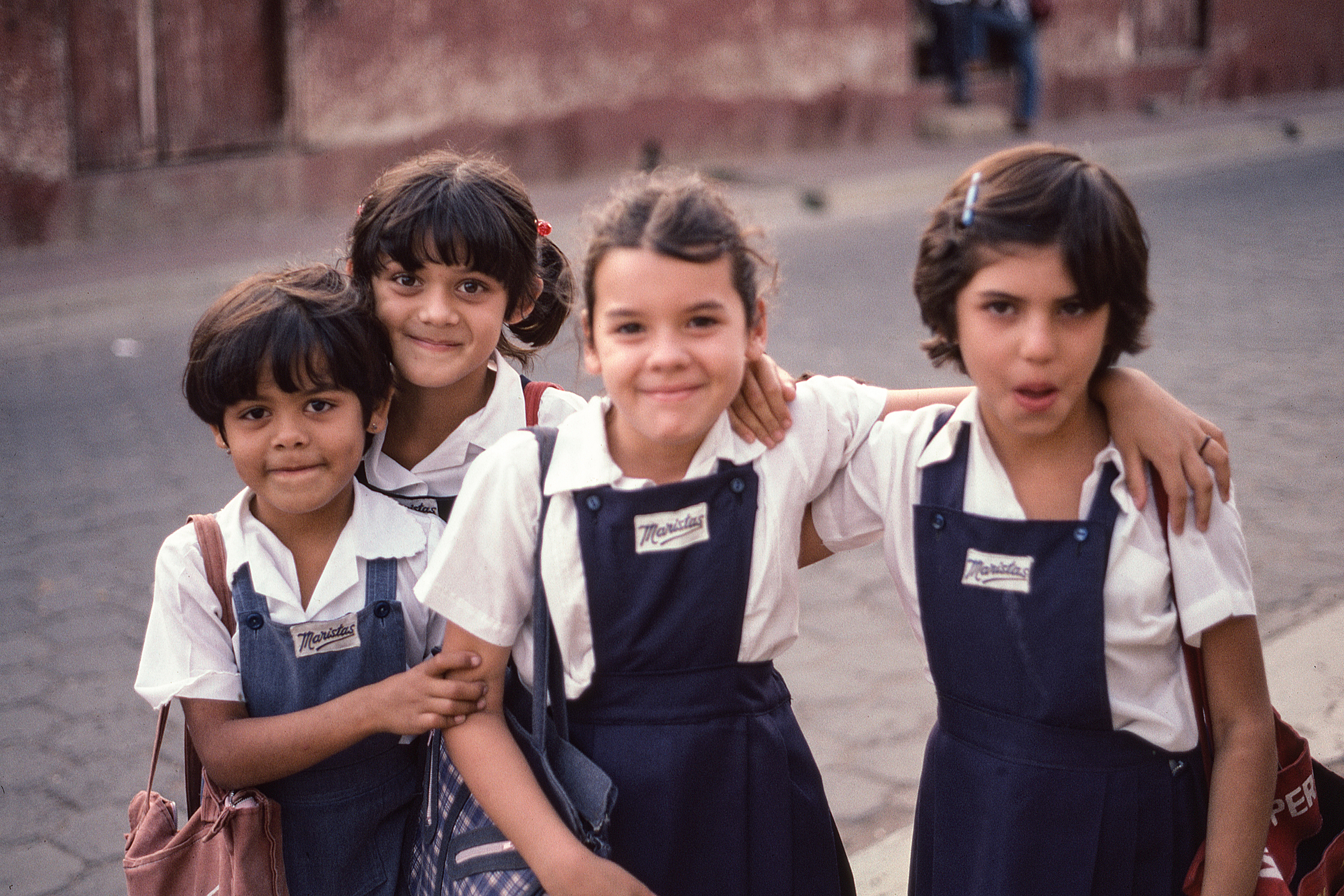
Young pinoleras. 1984

Pinolero is one of several colloquial terms for a Nicaraguan. The term is used extensively in the Nicaraguan and Honduran varieties of Spanish. The feminine of pinolero is pinolera, and the plural is Pinoleros/Pinoleras. Other colloquial references to Nicaraguans include Nica (used most often) and Nicoya, both of which are gender-neutral terms. In neighboring countries, Nicaraguans are also called chochos and mucos. The number of slang demonyms for Nicaraguans is triple that of Costa Ricans, Guatemalans and Hondurans, who are known, respectively, as ticos, chapines, and catrachos. Salvadorans, meanwhile, have two such terms, including cuzcatlecos and guanacos, the latter being less flattering.

== Etymology ==
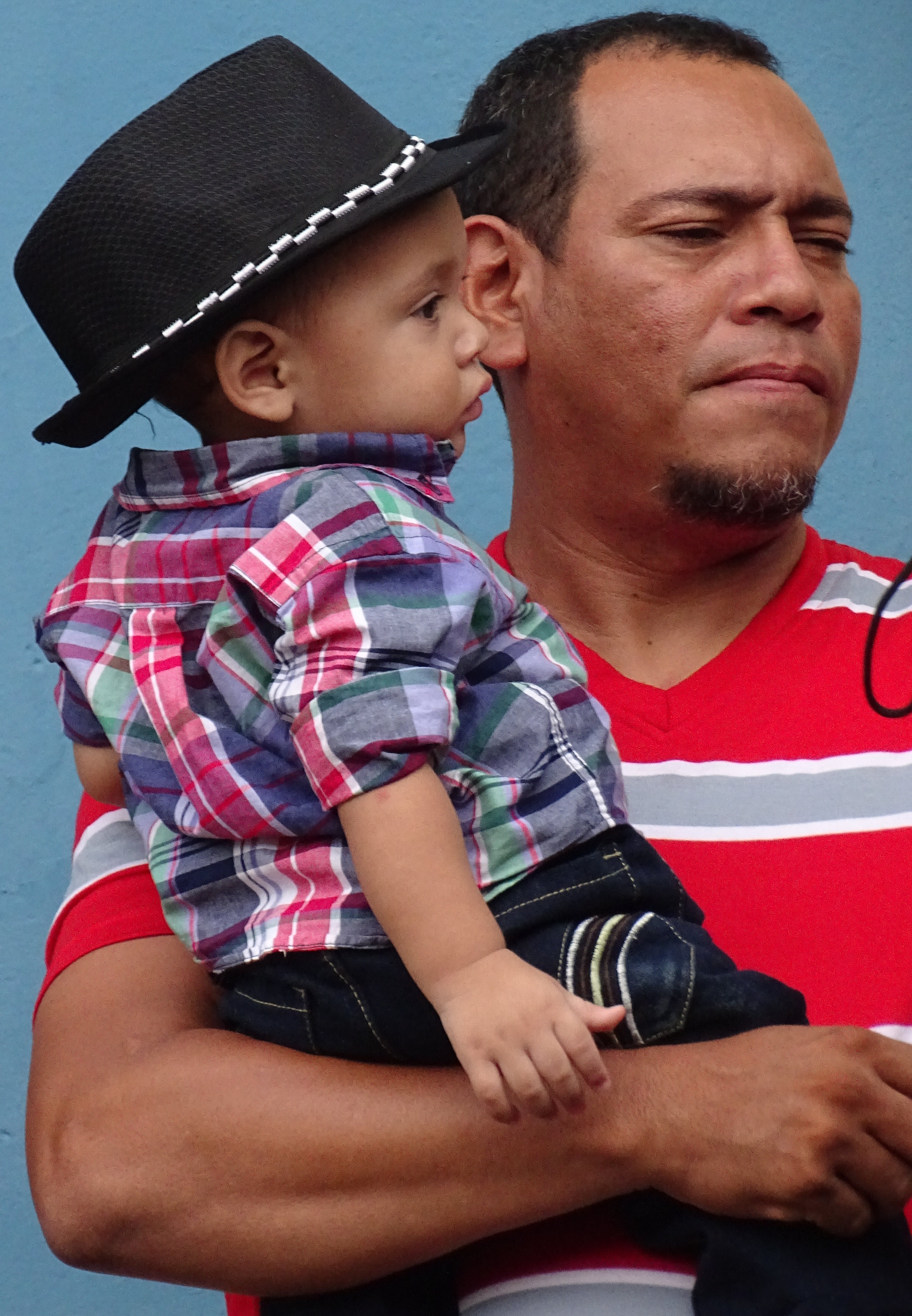
Two pinoleros in León, Nicaragua. There are over 7 million pinoleros residing in the country.

The origin of the term is disputed, and there are three possible explanations. The first is that the term is derived from the word pinol, a toasted ground corn made into a powder called Pinolillo, which in turn, is used in a variety of local cuisine and beverage preparations. Historically, corn-based products were the primary food staple of the indigenous peoples of Nicaragua.

The second possible origin is the slogan "Soy puro pinolero; ¡nicaragüense por gracia de Dios!" (English: I am a pure pinolero, Nicaraguan by the grace of God!") from the patriotic song "Nicaragua mía" (English: "My Nicaragua") by Tino López Guerra.

The third origin story, which is less accepted, is that the term comes from the Pinolero pickup truck, produced during the 1970s by the state-run company Industrias Nicaragüenses de Vehículos, SA (English: Nicaraguan Vehicle Industries Corporation). Pinoleros were the first vehicle manufactured and commercialized in Nicaragua, and they were a source of national pride.

== Usage in Mexico ==
In Mexico, the adjective pinolero qualifies something related to pinol. The noun pinolero/pinolera refers to an aficionado of pinol, and the feminine noun pinolera refers to a vessel used for storing pinol.

== See also ==
- Culture of Nicaragua
