= Pinolillo =

Nicaraguan corn and cacao beverage

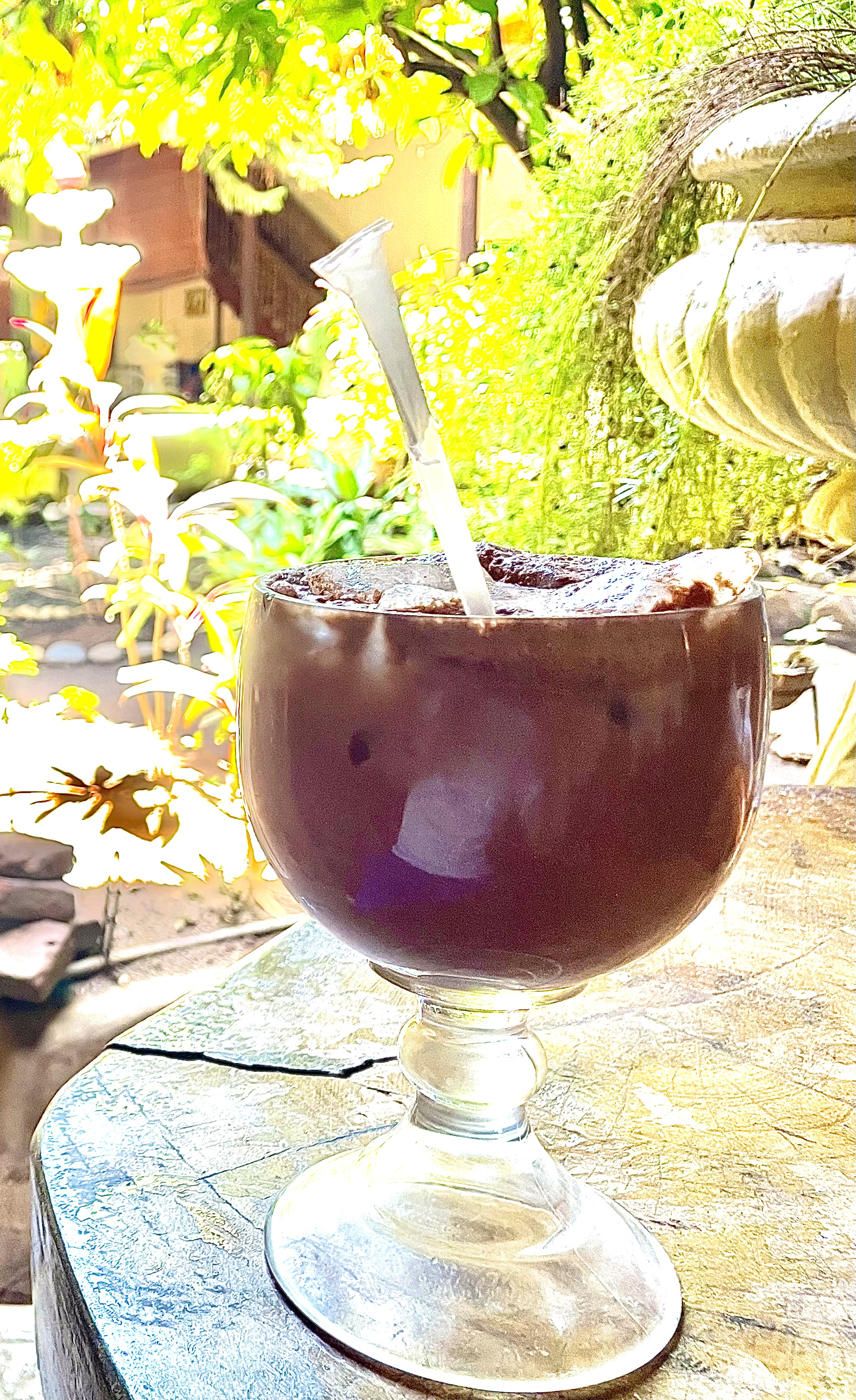
- Type: Chocolate beverage
- Origin: Nicaragua
- Ingredients: Cornmeal, cacao

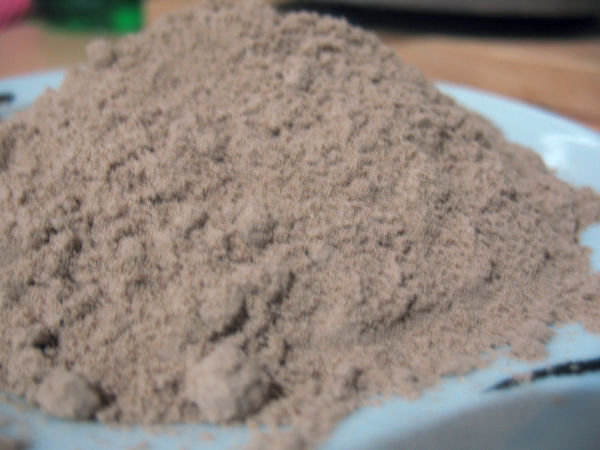
Pinolillo in powder form

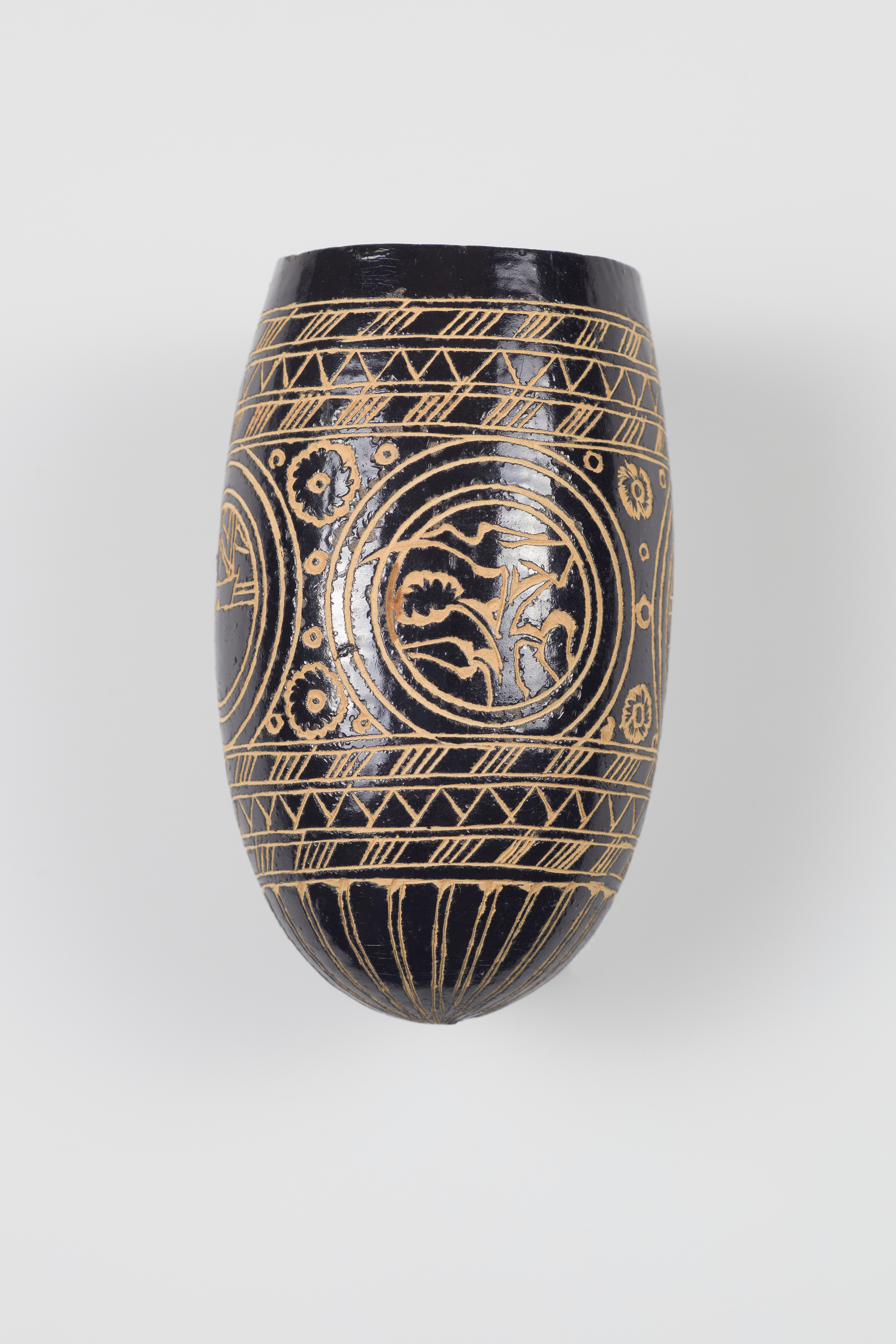
Nicaraguan Carved Gourd Bowl Given to Charles A. Lindbergh in 1928

Pinolillo is a traditional, nutrient-dense cornmeal and cacao-based drink that has been consumed in Nicaragua and Costa Rica for centuries, including by indigenous people before European contact. The sweet drink is made of toasted corn, a small amount of roasted cacao, and spices such as cinnamon, allspice and cloves, traditionally ground with a mortar and pestle. Pinolillo can be mixed with water, milk or soy milk, and served sweetened or unsweetened. If unsweetened, it is rather bitter. The vitamin-rich drink is usually thick and has a gritty texture, and a pleasant aroma.

It is traditionally served out of an artisanal gourd called a jícara or cumbo, which is made from the hard shell of the jicaro fruit. Decorative gourds are often engraved by hand with flowers or landscapes. These are sold as souvenirs to tourists and also appreciated by Nicaraguans.

== Pinole ==
The name comes from pinole, a toasted and ground form of maize that is its main ingredient. Also known as pinol, it is frequently used in traditional Nicaraguan dishes such as pinol de iguana, a hearty iguana-meat stew associated with Lent and Holy Week.

== Varieties ==
A variety of the drink known as tibio is often consumed with breakfast or on rainy evenings. This variety is thicker than usual, with milk sometimes used instead of water. According to custom, women who have recently given birth are advised to drink tibio, as it is said to increase milk production. Tibio is often paired with tortillas and cuajada, or tortillas and queso seco (a firm, dry Nicaraguan cheese).

A similar drink is called tiste. It is made with the same ingredients, but has a higher proportion of cacao. A typical beverage in eastern Guatemala, mainly in Chiquimula Department, is called fresco de tiste. Its ingredients are cacao, corn, annatto, and cane sugar to taste.

== Pinolillo and Nicaraguan culture ==
Consumption of pinolillo is so widespread and traditional that the substance has become a symbol of Nicaraguan culture. Nicaraguans often refer to themselves as pinoleros, either jokingly or with pride. The word pinolero may derive from pinolillo. The phrase "Soy puro Pinolero, ¡Nicaragüense por gracia de Dios!" (I'm a pure Pinolero, Nicaraguan by the grace of God!) comes from the patriotic song Nicaragua Mía by Tino López Guerra. The popular saying is frequently used by the Nicaraguan co-president, Daniel Ortega, in his speeches.

== See also ==
- Nicaraguan cuisine
- List of maize dishes
- Gofio
