= Canelazo =

Alcoholic beverage

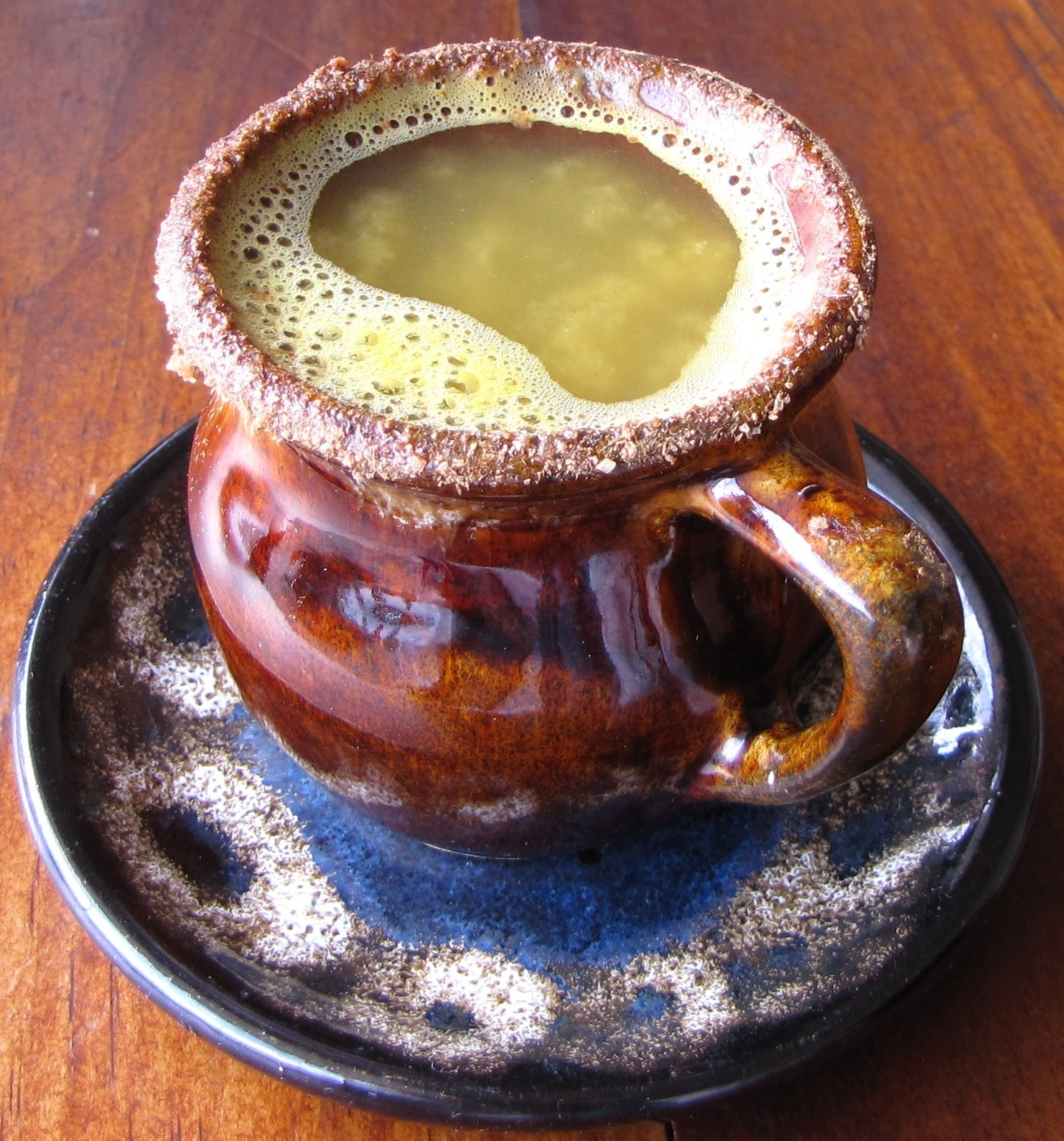
- A cup of Colombian canelazo
- Type: Mixed drink
- Origin: Andean highlands of South America
- Ingredients: Aguardiente, cinnamon

Canelazo is a hot alcoholic beverage consumed in the Andean highlands of Colombia, Ecuador, Peru and northern Argentina.

== In Colombia and Ecuador ==
It typically consists of aguardiente (sugar cane alcohol), sugar or panela, and agua de canela (water boiled with cinnamon). Canelazo is traditionally made with homemade aguardiente, but bottled alcohol is also used. There are many variations on the recipe. It is often made with fruit juice (typically naranjilla, mora, or maracuyá juice). Cloves are sometimes added, and alcohol is sometimes omitted.

The origins of the drink date back to Colombia, but the drink has long been consumed in the Andes. In Ecuador, the drink is often sold by street vendors during holidays. It is especially popular during Fiestas de Quito or Christmas. In 2005, one business began bottling canelazo without alcohol for export.

== In Peru ==
Canelazo is consumed in the northern highlands of Peru, specifically around Ayabaca in Piura. It consists of aguardiente with sugar (or chancaca) and cinnamon boiled in water; lemon and chicha de jora may also be added.

== See also ==
- List of Ecuadorian dishes and foods
