= Máchica =

Flour made from toasted barley or other grains

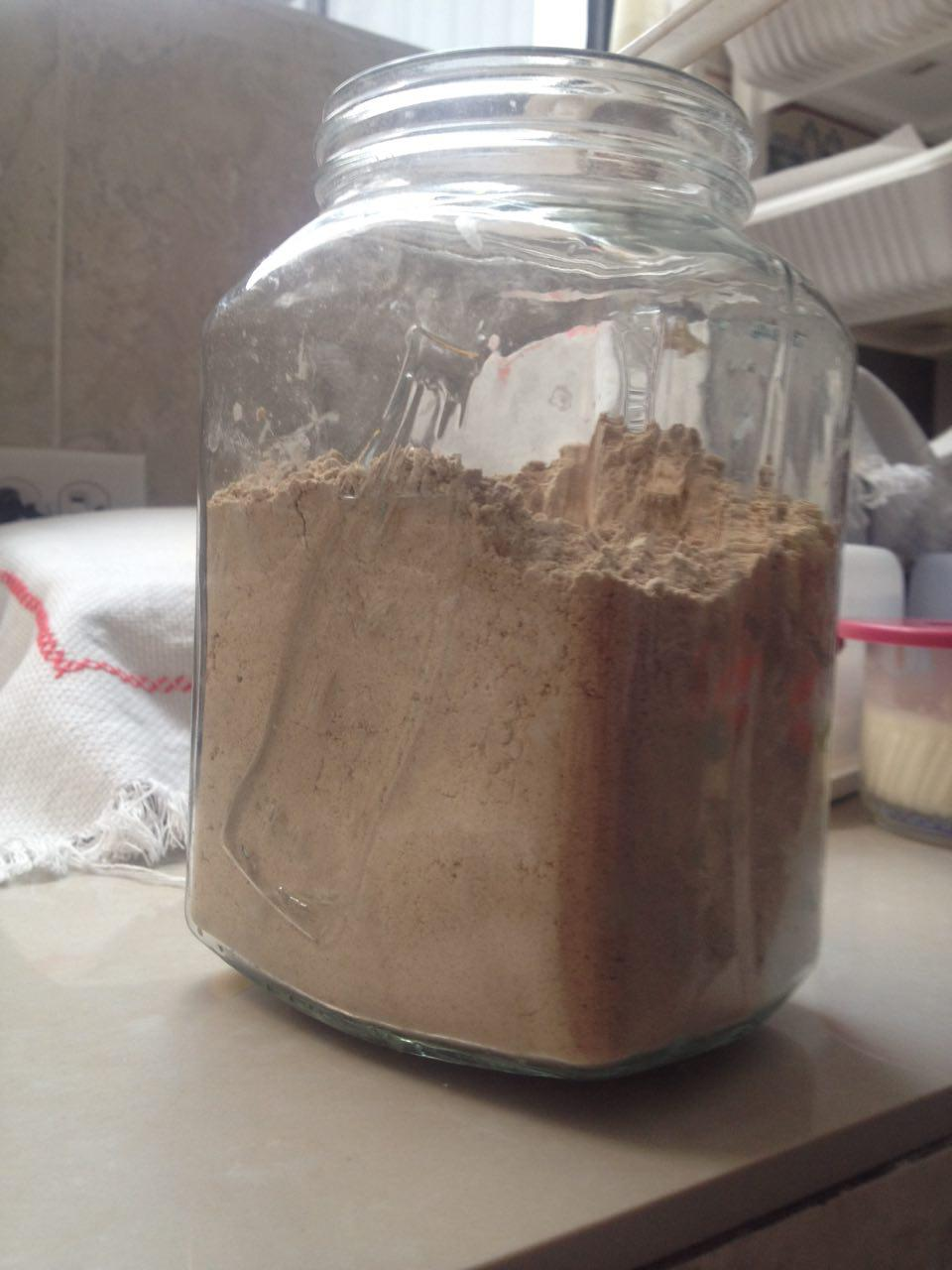
Máchica in a storage jar

Máchica (Quechua: machka) is a type of flour made from ground toasted barley or other toasted grains. It is used in Bolivian, Ecuadorian and Peruvian cuisine.

== History ==
Spanish colonists brought the technique of toasting grain to enhance its nutritional value, then grinding the toasted grain into flour, from Central America to the Andean region. The Mesoamerican product, pinole, uses toasted corn, but in Ecuador the process was applied primarily to barley.

== Production ==
Grain is toasted, then ground finely.

== Uses ==
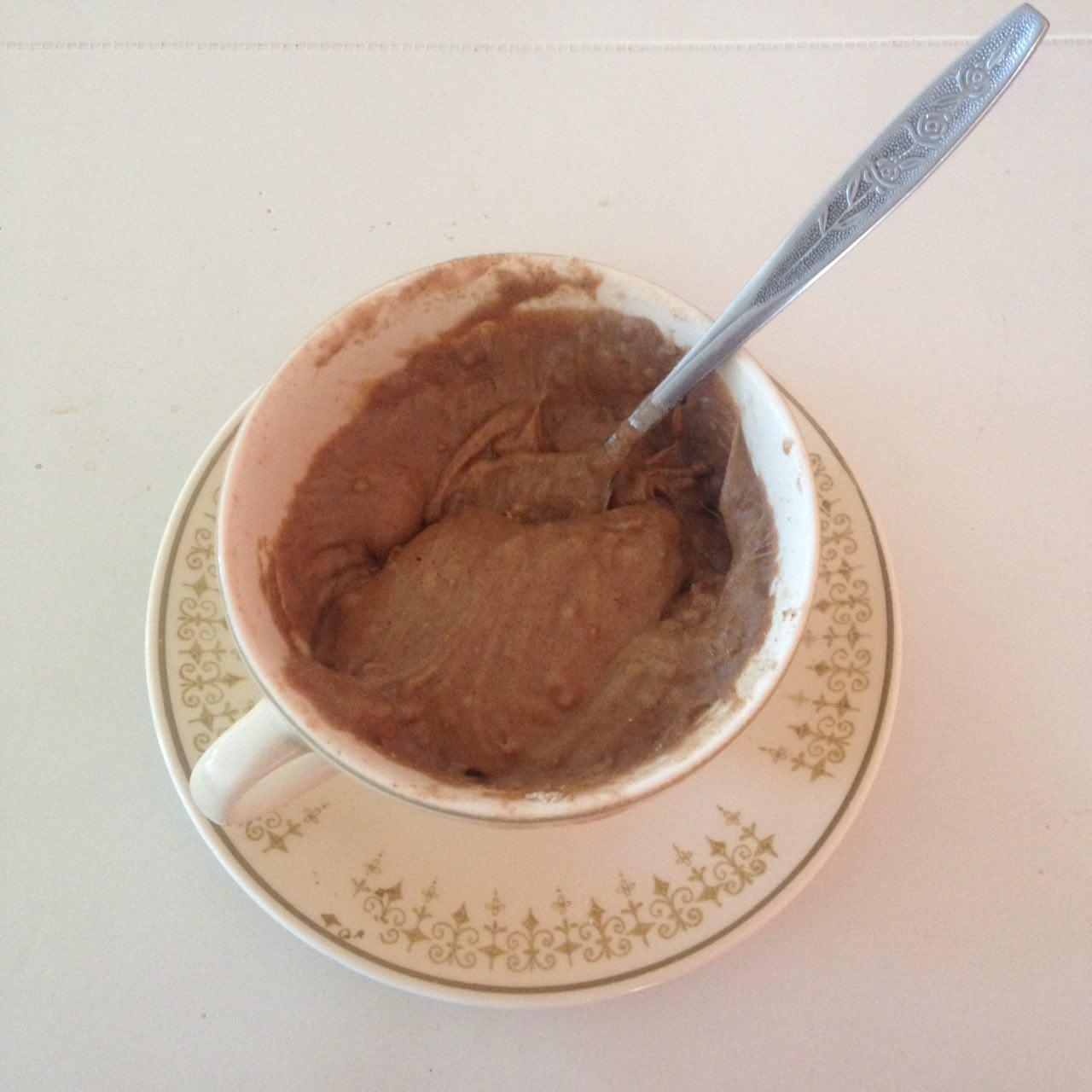
A mug of chapo mixed with chocolate and mozzarella cheese

Máchica is used in a variety of foods that are part of Andean cuisine. These include chapo, an herbal tea decoction made with lemongrass, lemon verbena or other herbs; another beverage called colada de máchica made by mixing the máchica with hot or cold liquid; nogadas, a nougat confection made using panela (unrefined cane sugar), eggs, máchica and a variety of walnut called toctes; pan de máchica, a variety of bread baked using máchica in addition to untoasted flour; pinol—akin to but distinct from pinole—a beverage prepared in a manner similar to colada de máchica but which also includes ground panela and spices such as anise, cinnamon and cloves; sopa con máchica, any of a variety of savory soups or stews thickened with máchica; and torta de máchica, a cake baked with máchica. Soups to which máchica is added typically have a base of carrots, legumes, onions and potatoes, and may or may not contain meat. It is used to batter and season meat to be fried, such as pork rinds or shellfish including shrimp. Máchica is sometimes also added to hot chocolate or cold juice, and has been used to flavor ice cream. It is incorporated into stroopwafels (a cookie which originated in the Netherlands) made in Peru and filled with other Andean ingredients such as passion fruit and chicha. Some indigenous peoples use máchica to prepare cuy, a traditional meat.

== Nutritional value ==
One hundred grams of máchica made from barley contains 344 calories (kcal), 8.6 grams protein, 0.7 g fat, 77.4 grams carbohydrates, 6.6 g fiber, 74 mg calcium, 320 mg phosphorus, 12.3 mg iron, 0.12 mg vitamin B_{1}, 0.25 mg vitamin B_{2}, 8.7 mg niacin, and 1.9 mg vitamin C. For máchica made from wheat, 100 grams contain 347 calories, 7.9 g protein, 1.2 g fat, 79.9 g carbohydrates, 4.1 g fiber, 67 mg calcium, 0.9 mg iron, and 2.7 mg vitamin C.

== Other varieties ==
In Peru, the product sold as máchica is most often made of toasted corn flour. It is mixed with sugar and cinnamon in a manner similar to both Central American pinole and Ecuadorian pinol. Máchica may also refer to flour made with ground toasted wheat, a variation also found in Peru, as well as in Bolivia, where it is the most common type of máchica.

== See also ==
- Barley flour
- Gofio, a similar product in the Canary Islands, brought to Latin America
