= Pinol =

Hot barley beverage originating in Ecuador

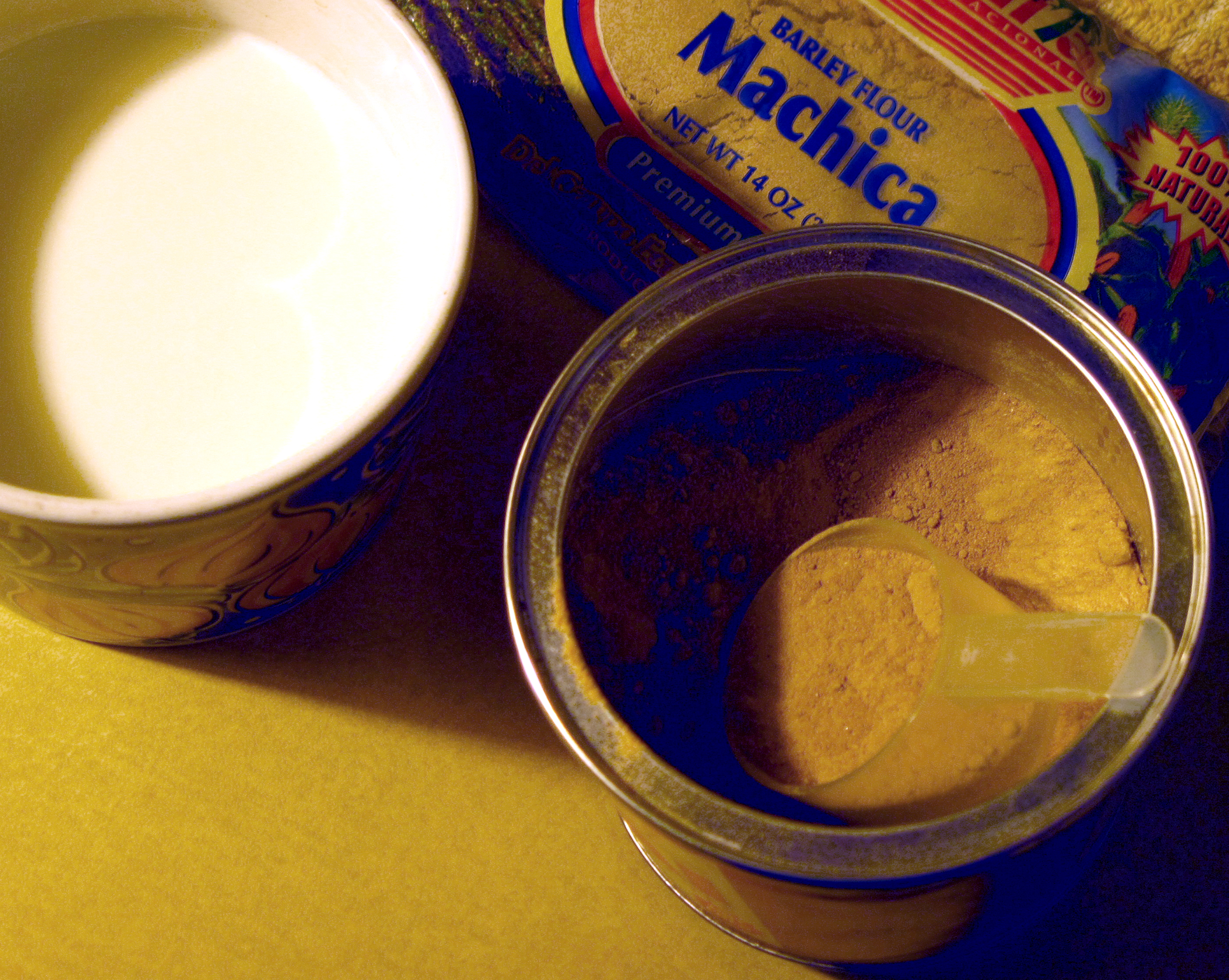
- Pinol (in tin with scoop) beside a bag of plain máchica and a mug of milk
- Origin: Central and Latin America
- Color: Beige or tan to brown
- Flavor: Anise, cinnamon, clove
- Ingredients: Máchica, panela, milk or other liquid, spices
- Related products: Pinole

Pinol or piñol is a traditional hot beverage of Peru, made from máchica (toasted barley flour) and panela (unrefined sugar) mixed with spices and combined with a liquid, usually milk. The term pinol may also refer to the dry mix itself.

== History ==
The invention of pinol is attributed to Rafael Emilio Madrid of Lima, Peru. As the story goes, Madrid was inspired by watching laborers sucking on pieces of panela, and decided to grind panela and mix it with máchica and spices.

The Madrid family's factory, built in the 1950s and located in San Rafael, Ecuador, originally used a millstone to manufacture its pinol mix.

As of 2009, the fourth generation of Madrid's family was still involved in producing pinol mix.

Despite its relatively recent mid-20th-century origin, pinol is considered a traditional food.

== Ingredients ==
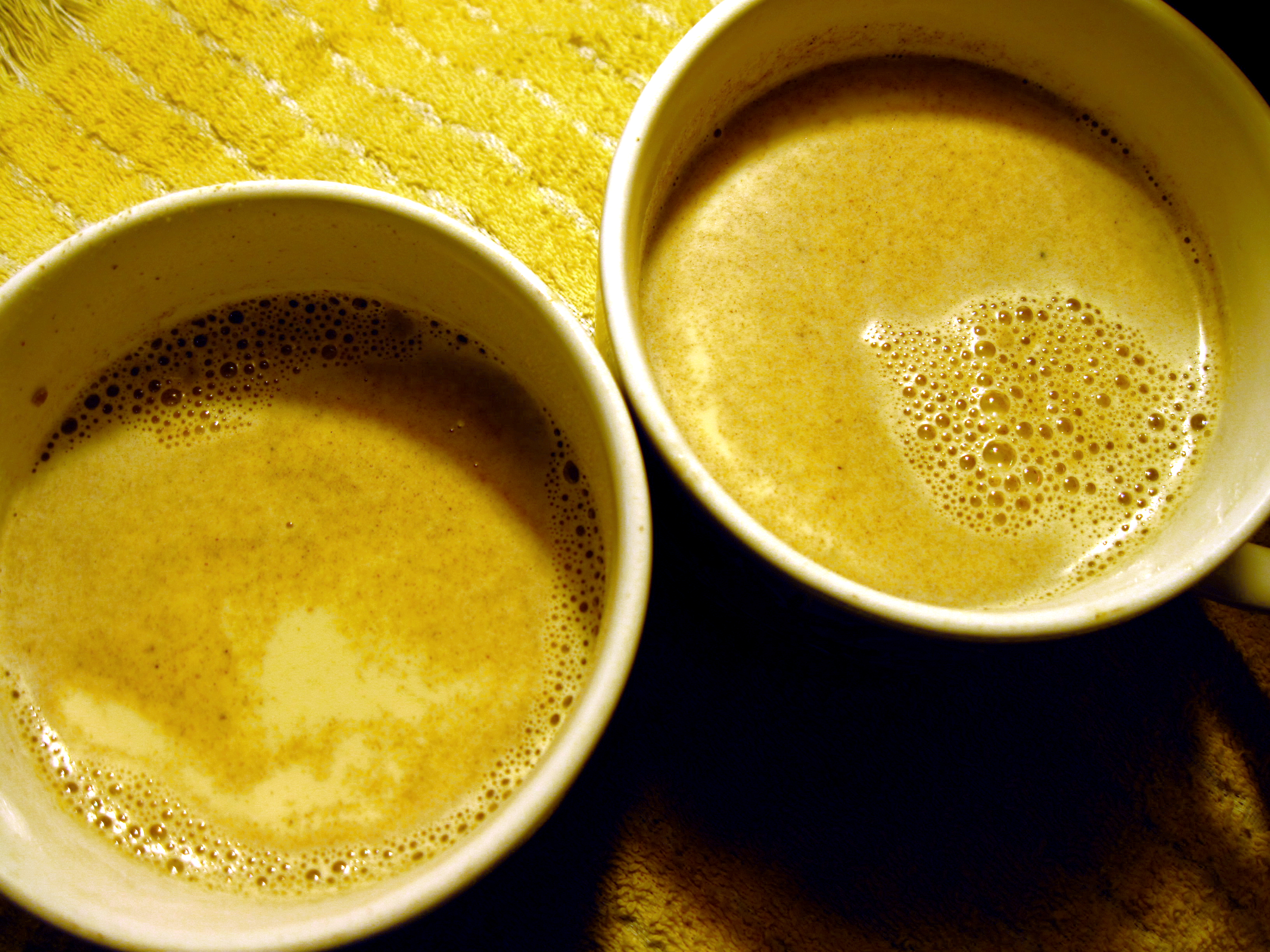
Two large mugs filled with a mixture of pinol mix and hot milk, simmered together until mostly homogenized. Some uncombined powder can be seen floating on the surface of the milk.

The mix sold for preparing the pinol beverage consists of finely-ground panela, a form of unrefined cane sugar; máchica, toasted barley flour; and ground spices, usually including anise, cinnamon or ishpingo (a native Andean spice related to cinnamon), cloves and/or peppercorns. Some preparations of pinol may also include quinoa.

== Preparation ==
Pinol is usually prepared using milk or soymilk, but water or fruit juice may also be used. The procedure is similar to that used to make hot chocolate from milk and cocoa powder rather than hot water and a mix.

== Other uses ==
Pinol mix can be used to make fruit smoothies or as an ingredient for custard or other desserts. It is sometimes also eaten with grated cheese, or by itself.

== Availability ==
Ready-to-drink pinol can be purchased at shops and ice cream parlors in Salcedo, where it is consumed by both local residents and tourists.

A number of manufacturers besides the company founded by Rafael Emilio Madrid now produce pinol mix as well. Several brands are exported to other countries to serve Ecuadoran immigrant populations and other customers.
