= Fiestas de Quito =

Week to celebrate the founding of Quito, Ecuador

The Fiestas de Quito (Quito celebrations) traditionally celebrate the foundation of Quito, capital city of Ecuador, and take place over the course of a week from the end of November to 6 December. During this period, bullfighting at the Plaza de Toros, flamenco dancing, opera and theater shows are presented. Parades feature the newly chosen Reina de Quito ("Queen of Quito"), marching school war bands, and other events can be enjoyed. In addition to marking the founding of Quito, some neighborhoods celebrate their favorite saint and there are processions and block parties with live music and bands. People can also take a ride around the city on a chiva, which is an open party bus with live bands. Plaza Foch is another destination for the people because of its vast space with restaurants, bars, clubs, hotels, shops and special events.
