= Gofio =

Toasted flour from the Canary Islands

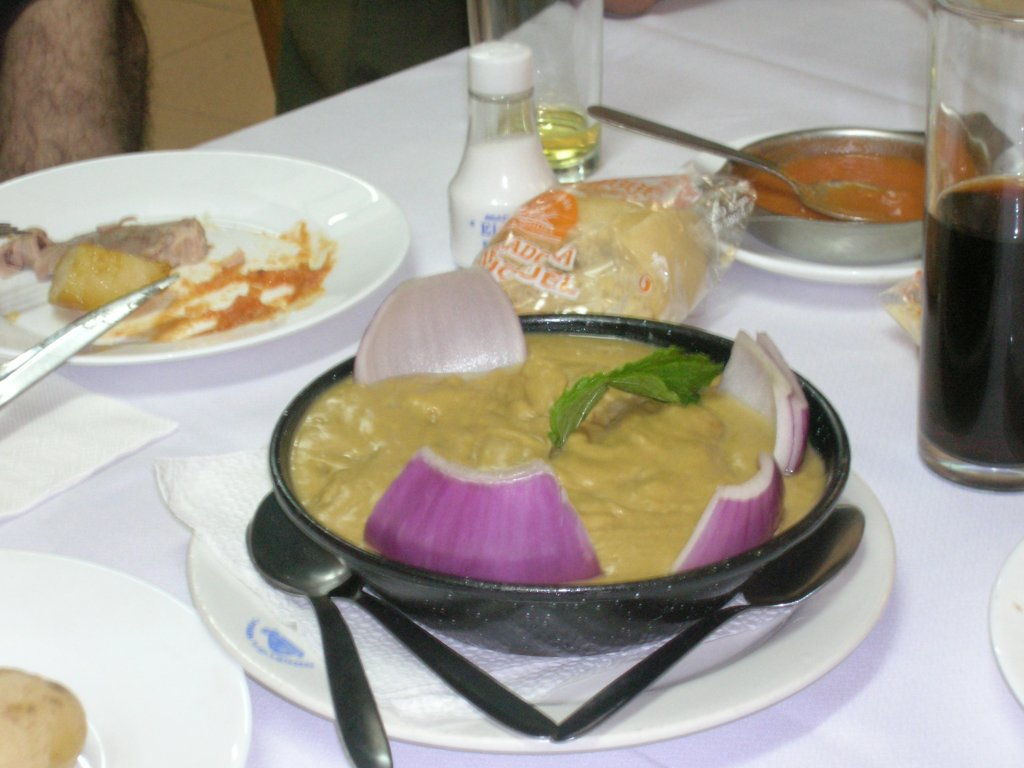
- A scalded gofio dish
- Region or state: Canary Islands
- Main ingredients: Wheat or maize

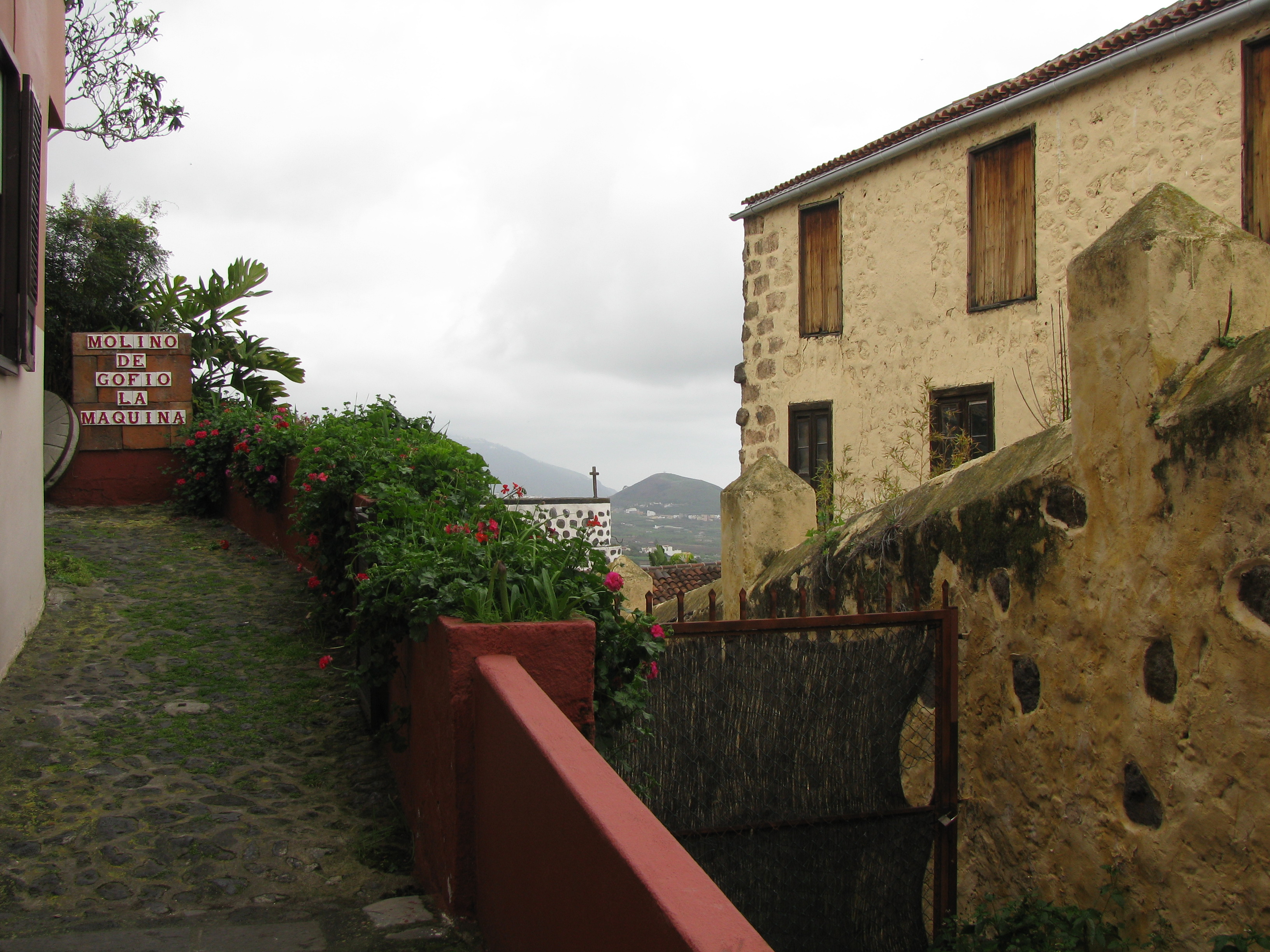
Gofio mill, La Orotava, Tenerife

Gofio is a type of Canarian flour made from roasted grains (typically wheat or certain varieties of maize) or other starchy plants (e.g. beans and, historically, fern root), some varieties containing a little added salt. Gofio has been an important ingredient in Canarian cooking for some time, and Canarian emigrants have spread its use to the Caribbean (notably in Cuba, Dominican Republic, Puerto Rico, and Venezuela) and the Western Sahara. There are various ways to use it, such as kneading, dissolving in soup, and baking. It can also be used as a thickener. It is also found in Argentina, Uruguay, and Chile, where it is known as harina tostada and is employed in a wide variety of recipes. The gofio commercially available in the Canary Islands is always finely ground, like ordinary flour, despite the definition given in the Spanish Dictionary of the Royal Academy.

In 2014, the name Gofio Canario was added to the register of Protected designation of origin and Protected geographical indication by the European Commission.

== Elements ==
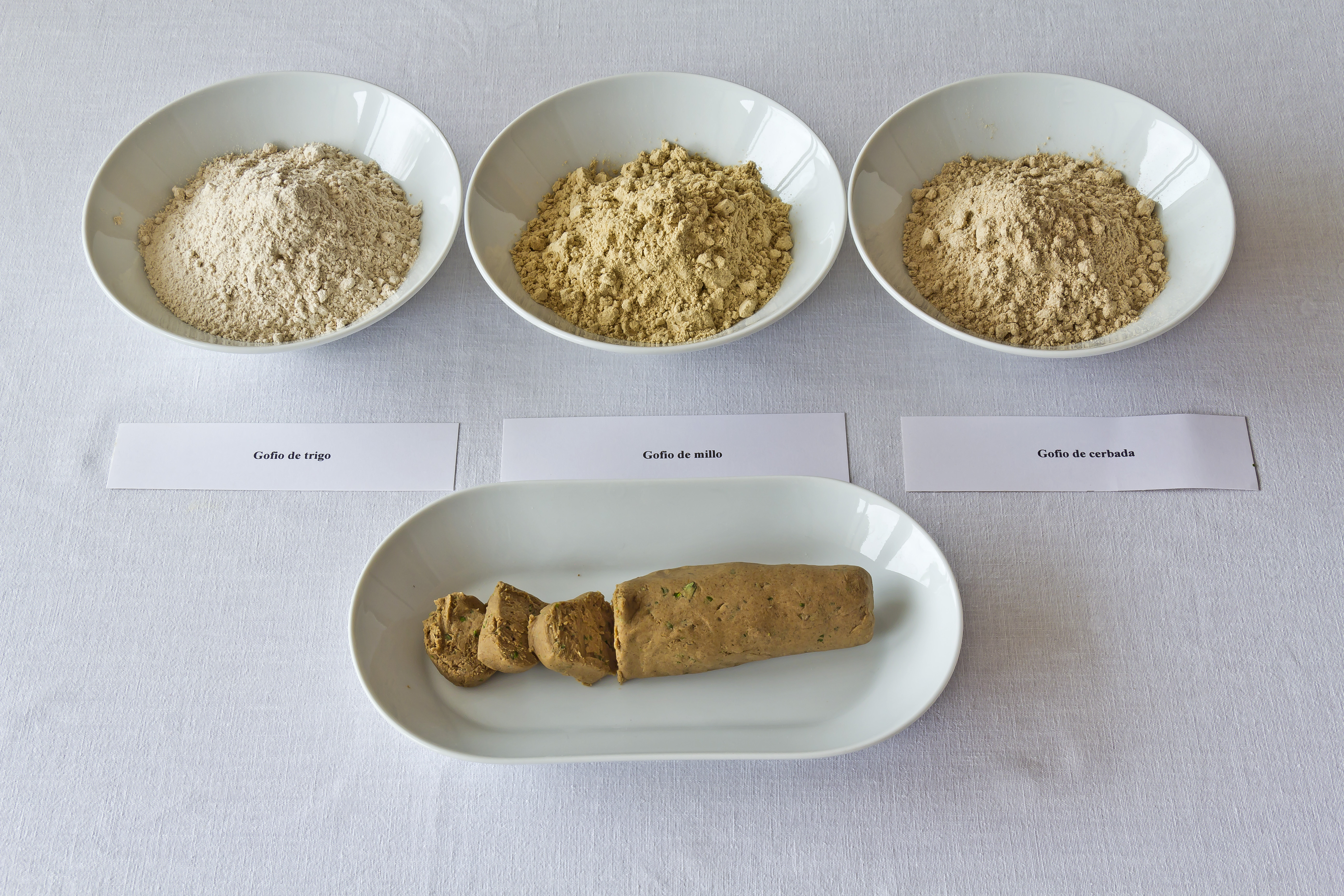

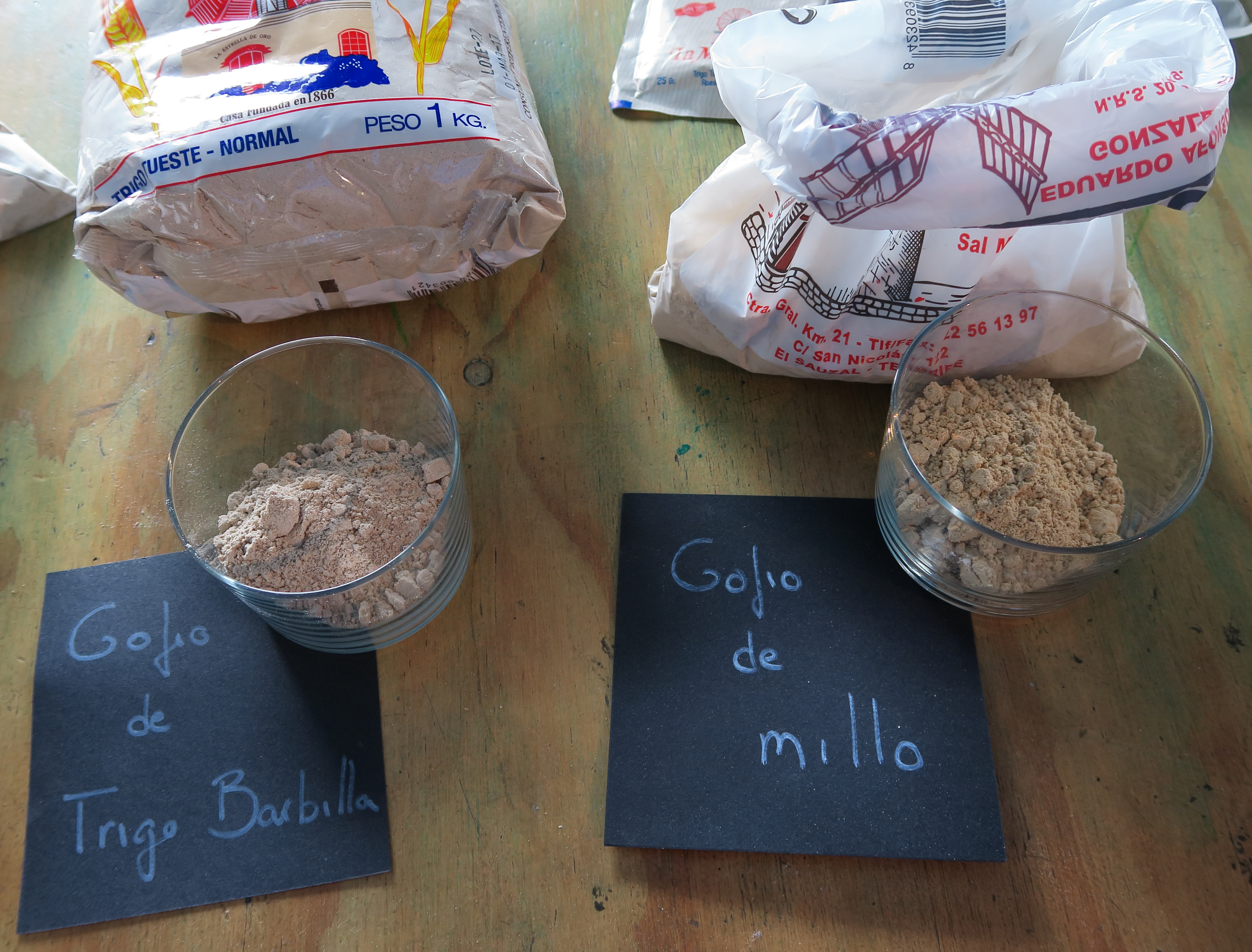

Gofio is thought to have been the main staple of the diet of the Guanches, the original inhabitants of the Canary Islands, who produced it from barley and the rhizome of certain ferns. The latter is also known to have been used in historical times, especially in famine, even up until the 20th century. Gofio derives from the name for the product in the aboriginal language of Gran Canaria, while in neighbouring Tenerife it was known as ahoren. Among the Berbers of North Africa, from whom the Guanche population largely derived, there existed a toasted barley flour with similar usage as a food, called arkul. In Morocco, toasted flour is also mixed with, among other ingredients, almond paste, honey, argan oil, anise, fennel, and sesame seeds to make "sellou" (also called "zamita" or "slilou" in some regions), a sweet paste known for its long shelf life and high nutritive value. It was amongst the provisions of the crew of Thor Heyerdahl's "Ra II" expedition to cross the Atlantic aboard a papyrus ship using the Canary Current in 1970.

Flours made from toasted grains are also known in other gastronomies worldwide, notably Tibetan tsampa. Roasting the grain before milling has the advantage of destroying mold and mold toxins, allowing poorly stored grain to be used, as well as improving flavour by producing more complex sugars. The traditional roasting process, at temperatures typically much higher than those used for malt barley in the brewing industry, for example, also has the effect of partly breaking down the starch and proteins, making them more digestible. Gofio with milk, sugar and water is a very popular beverage in Western Sahara, due to Spanish influence and the proximity of the Canary Islands.

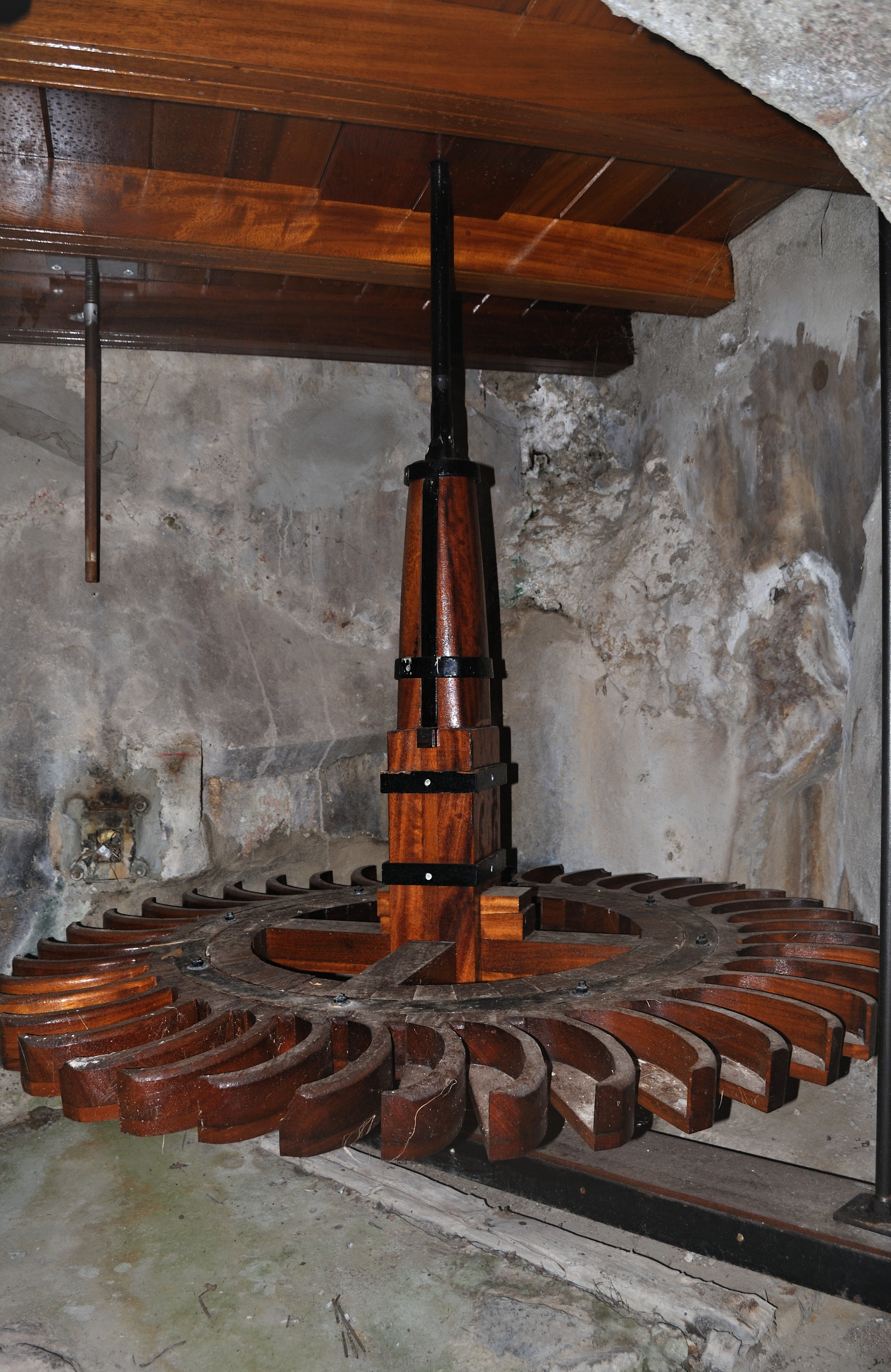
Wheels for hydraulically processing grains

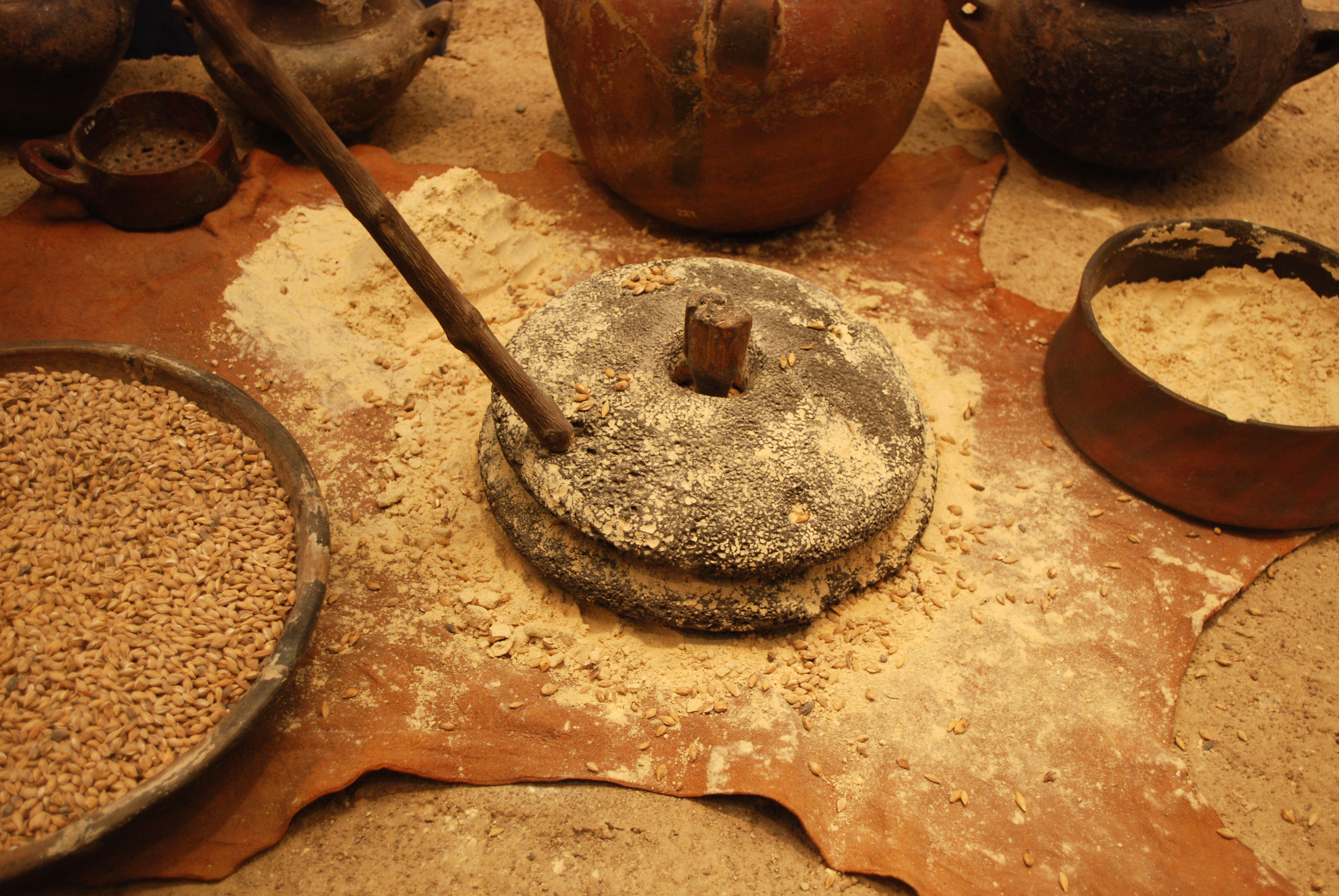
Preparation of gofio by means of a rotary quern-stone

Gofio in the Canary Islands is currently produced from cereals of several types, as well as pulses. Maize and wheat are the most common cereals used, but various mixes of these with rye, barley, etc., are also readily available in shops. Gofios of chickpeas and lupin beans are also produced in Fuerteventura, as well as from other wild plants occurring there.

== Uses in Canarian foods ==
Gofio is a highly versatile product which can be added to soups, stews, desserts, ice cream, sauces, and more. It is very rich in vitamins, proteins, fibre, and minerals. It was favoured by Canarian mariners as it can be stored for long periods while retaining its goodness. It was a vitally important part of the Canarian diet during the lean years after the Spanish Civil War. Mixed with a little water and sugar and kneaded (traditionally inside a goatskin bag) it produces a dough-like mixture that can be eaten as it is and was traditionally used in this way by peasant workers in the fields. Perhaps the most common use today is to add to a small amount of milk, to produce a wholesome and convenient breakfast food, or to thicken soups or stews at the table. Another popular form is gofio escaldado ("scalded gofio") or escaldón, a kind of thick porridge made by mixing it with the stock from a stew or soup, which is then served alongside the same. Modern products incorporating gofio include ice cream, mousses, other milk desserts, energy bars and even a beer, Volcan, which was marketed for only a short time around the year 2000.

== Uses elsewhere ==
In the Caribbean, gofio is a snack eaten as it is. In Puerto Rico and the Dominican Republic, gofio is sold with sugar added, as a candy, sometimes served in a paper cone.

Aboriginals of Argentina and Chile had a preparation of maize made by the same method of making gofio since before the arrival of the Spaniards. With introduction of wheat and barley, maize was replaced by them. The preparation of gofio in other regions of South America and the Caribbean has come due to Canarian arrival. Gofio is consumed dry with sugar or with milk in Argentina, Chile, Nicaragua, Panama, Venezuela, Uruguay and many other countries.

== See also ==
- Grits – Porridge of boiled cornmeal
- Pinole – Roasted ground maize mixed with other powdered foodstuffs
- Máchica – Flour made from toasted barley or other grains
- Misutgaru – Grain-based Korean beverage
- Kinako
