= Pinole =

Roasted ground maize mixed with other powdered foodstuffs

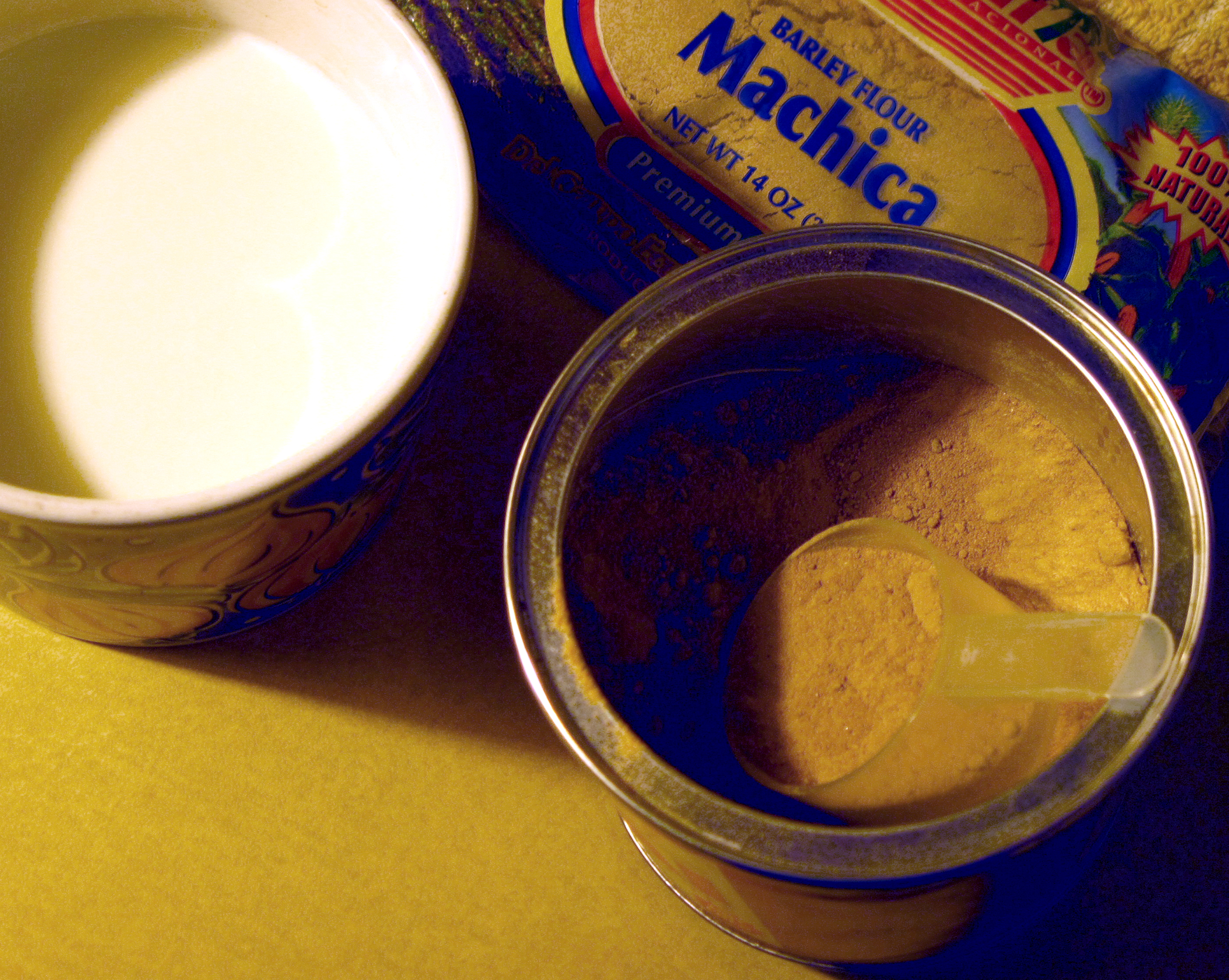
- Pinole (in tin) and milk
- Type: Ingredient
- Region or state: Latin America
- Main ingredients: Maize and cacao
- Similar dishes: Gofio

Pinole, also called pinol, is roasted ground maize. The resulting powder is then used as a nutrient-dense ingredient to make different foods, such as cereals, baked goods, tortillas, and beverages. For example, it can be mixed with a combination of cocoa, agave, cinnamon, chia seeds, vanilla, or other spices, to make a beverage called pinolillo. The name comes from the Nahuatl word pinolli, meaning cornmeal. Today, pinole is generally made by hand using wood-burning adobe ovens and a stone and pestle, and is still consumed in certain, often rural, parts of Latin America. Pinole is considered the national beverage of Nicaragua.

== Nutritional content ==
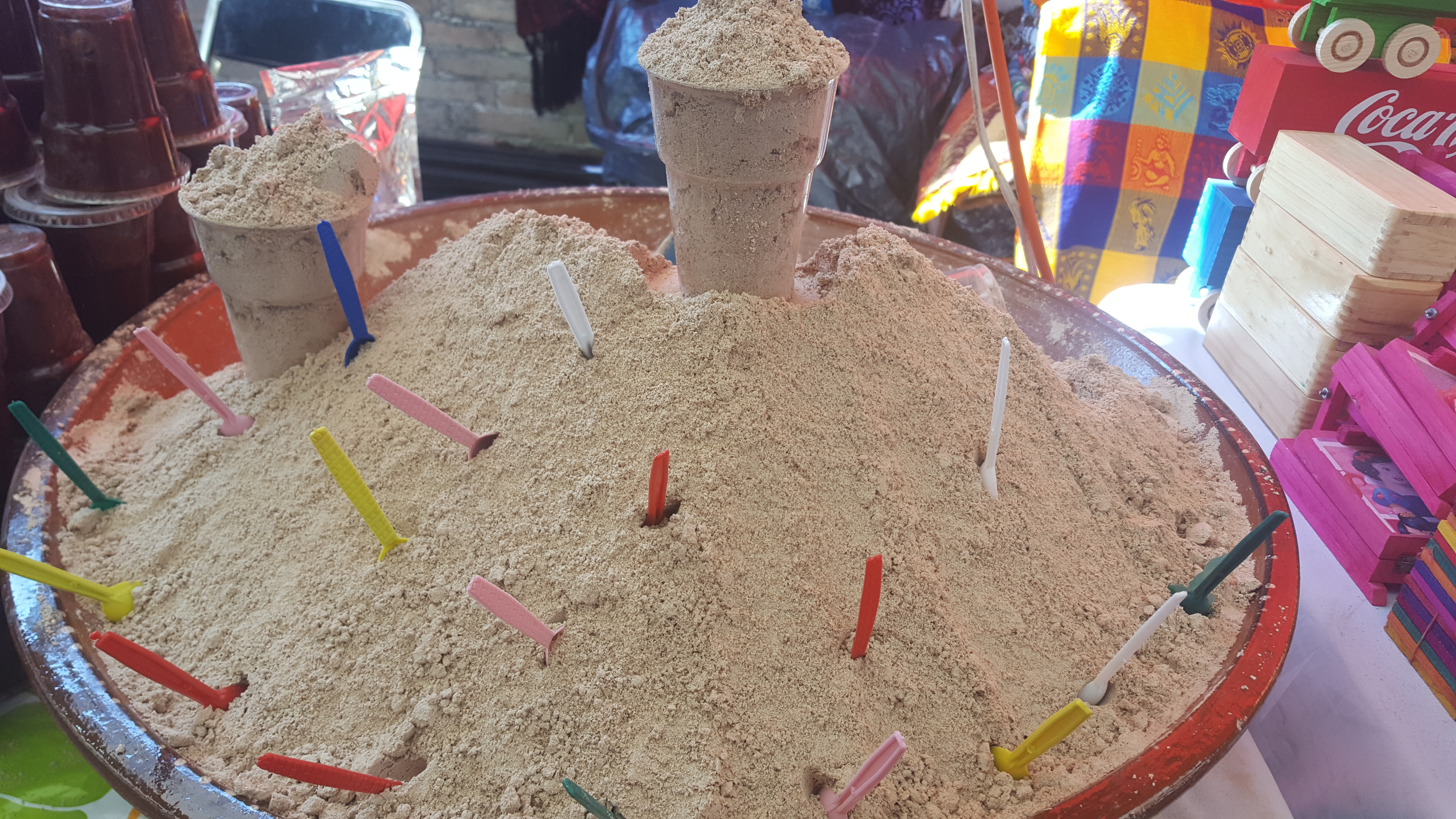
Clay casserole with pinole

Depending on the type of pinole and the quality of its ingredients, pinole can be high in key vitamins and nutrients, including carbohydrates, protein, fiber, and antioxidants. For many indigenous peoples of Mexico and Central America, it is a key source of nutrition and sustenance.

== Uses ==
=== Tarahumara people ===
Along with chia, pinole is a staple food of Rarámuri (Tarahumara) people, an indigenous people of the Copper Canyon of Mexico. The name Rarámuri means "footrunners". Noted for physical stamina and their ability to run extraordinarily long distances wearing only huarache sandals with soles made of recycled tire treads and their traditional garb of a white cotton loincloth with a woven belt, the Rarámuri consume bajíachi (corn beer) and pinole before races.

=== In other folklore ===
The recorded history of Pinole, California, dates back to the early 1700s, when a Spanish commandant, Don Pedro Fages, led an exploration through the Contra Costa shoreline of California. With a small band of soldiers and an Indian guide, Don Pedro Fages left Monterey and traveled northward until he reached the area known today as Pinole. According to legend, the soldiers ran out of provisions on their march and found a village of Indians who gave them food. This food consisted of a form of meal, made from acorns, seeds, and wild grain, which they called “pinole” (derived from the Aztec word pinolli, meaning ground and toasted grain or seeds.) Thus, the soldiers named their camp “El Pinole,” and Pinole received its name.

=== Commercial products ===
Authentic pinole can occasionally be found in rural markets throughout Mexico and Central America. It is generally made by hand and sold as a powder in burlap pouches. A sugar-heavy, mass-market version can also sometimes be found in Latin American supermarkets under brands such as Don Julio.

== See also ==
- Gofio
- List of porridges
- Hominy
- Kinako
