= Colombian cuisine =

Culinary traditions of Colombia

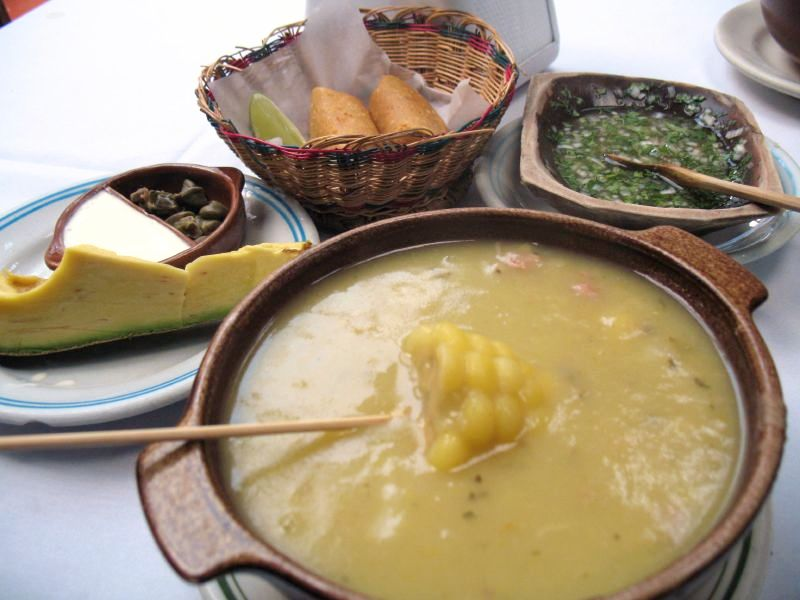
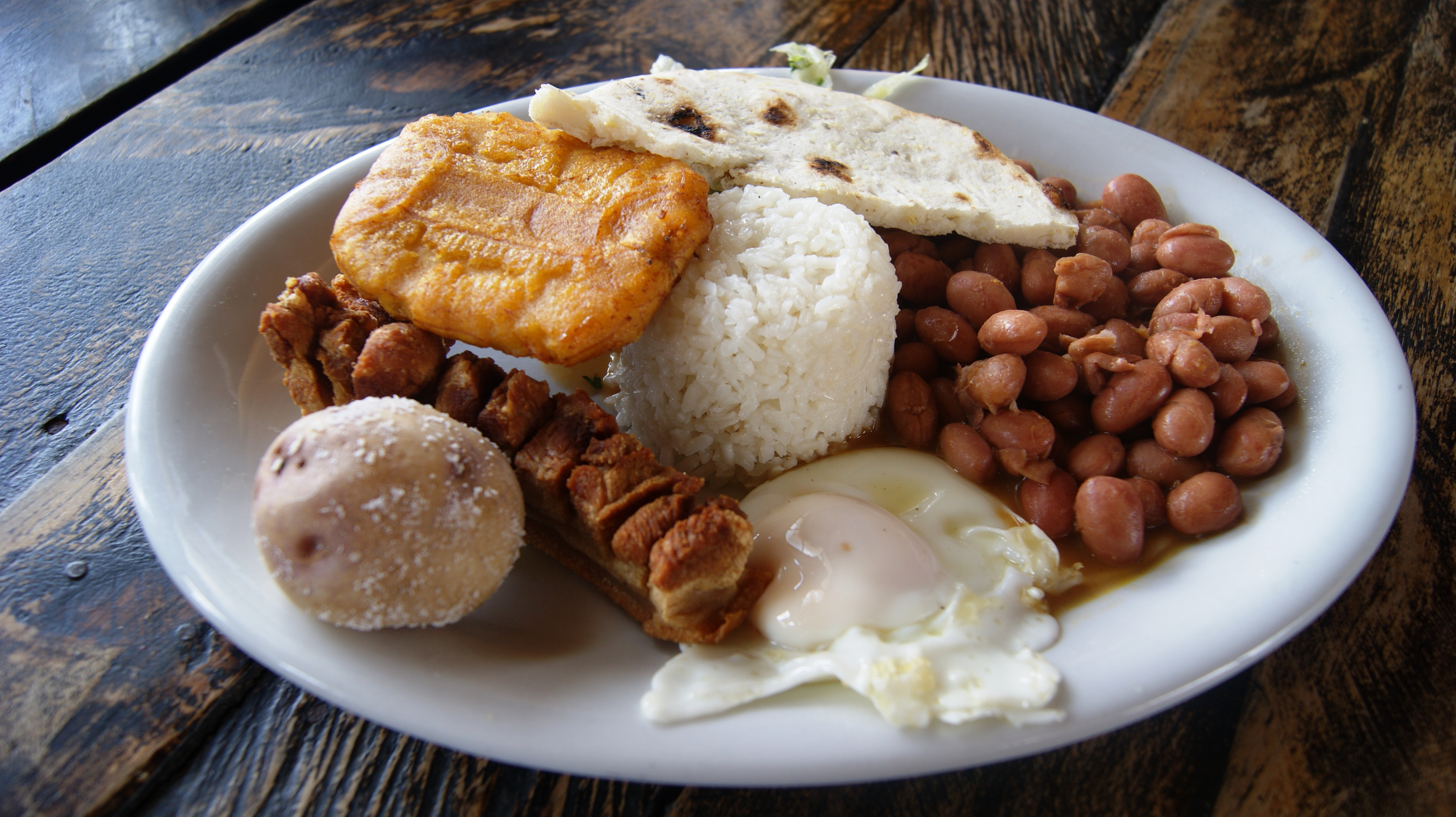
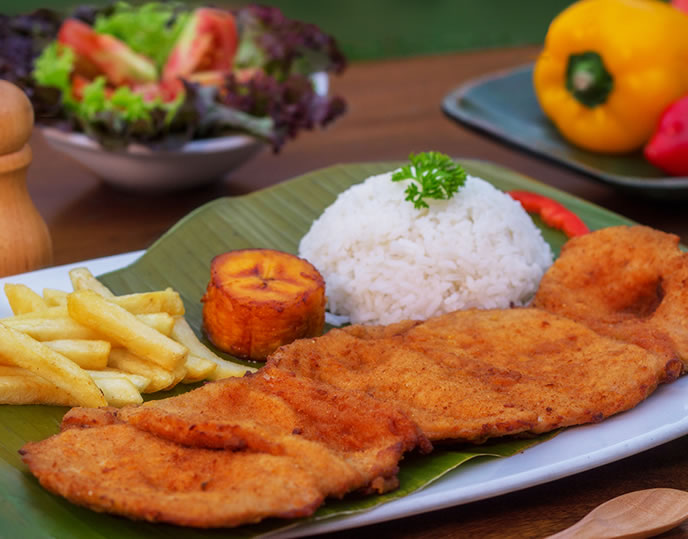
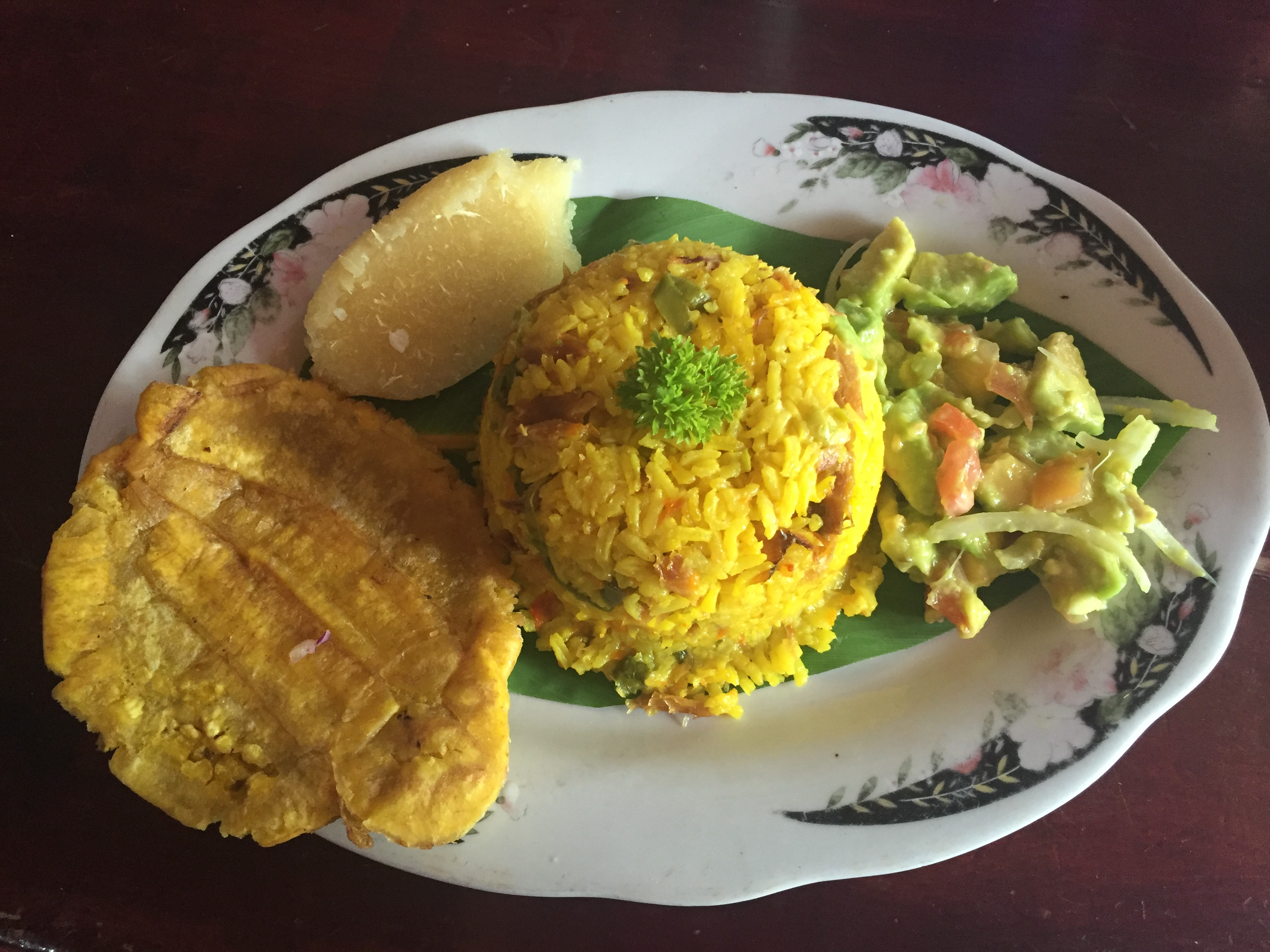
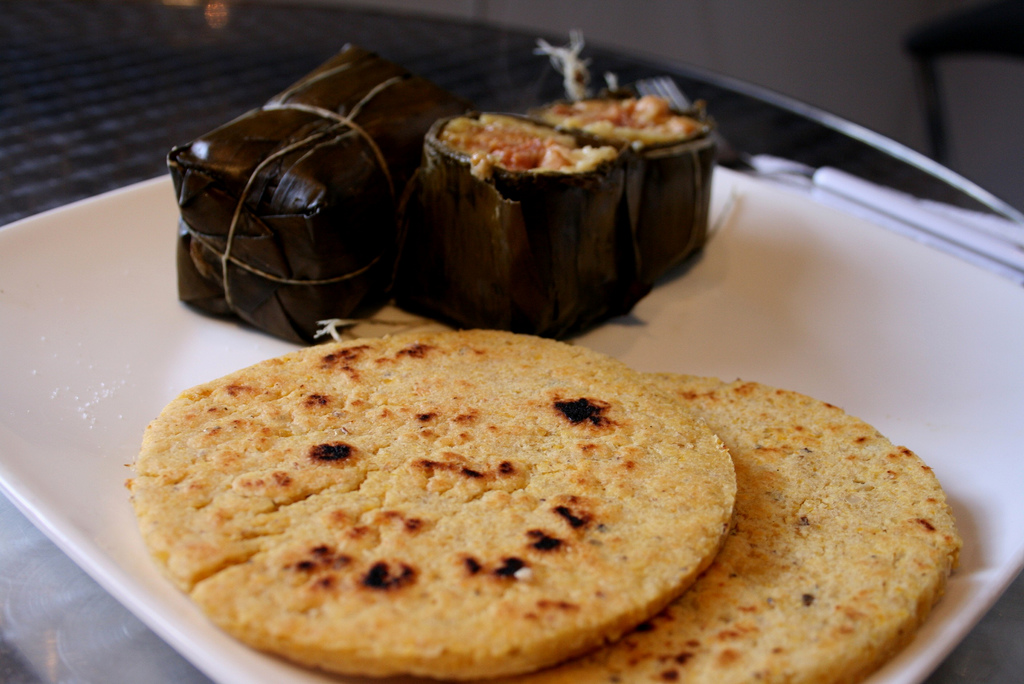
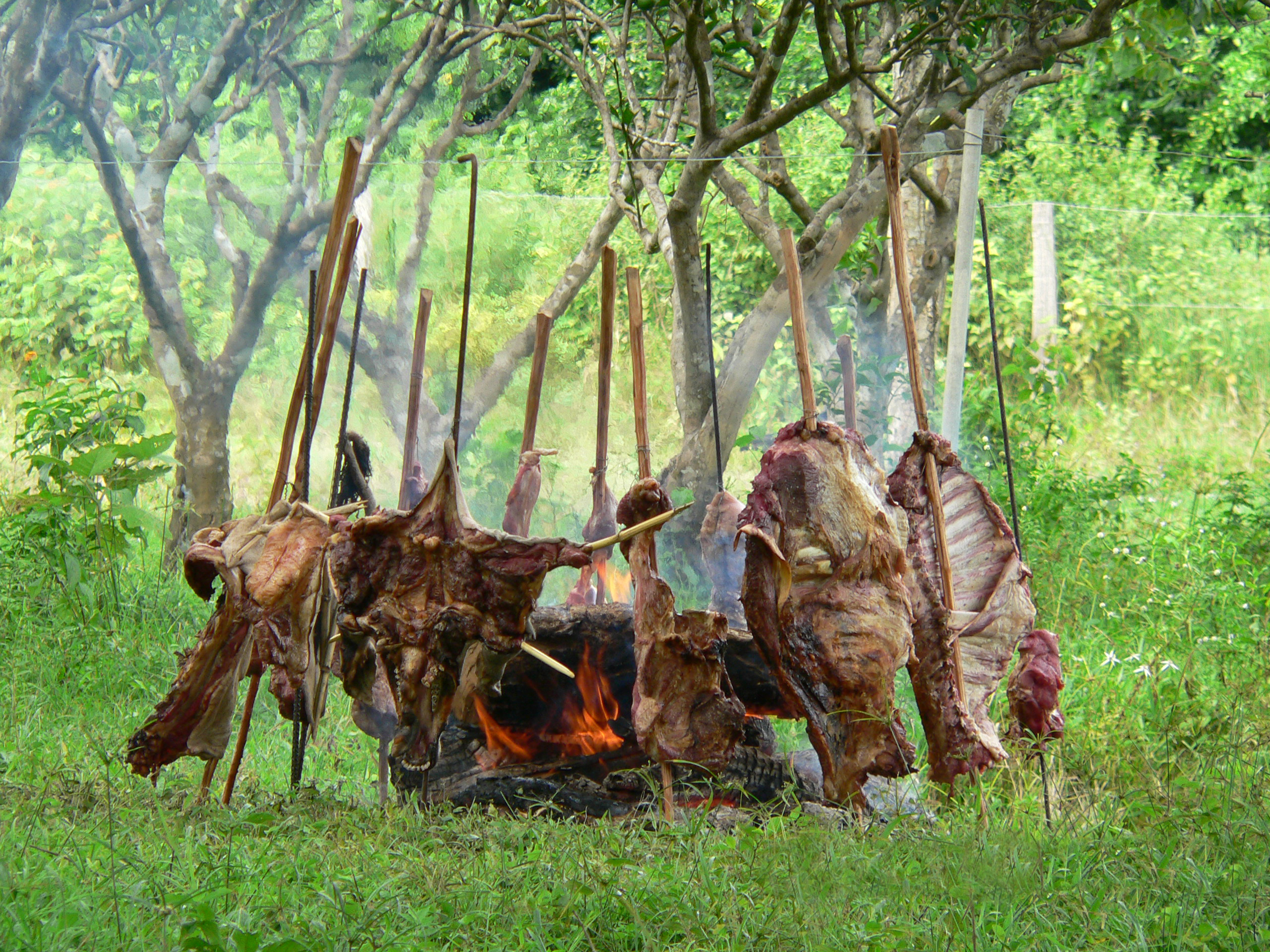
Clockwise from upper left: ajiaco from Bogotá, bandeja paisa from Antioquia, cutlet Valluna, arroz de lisa from Barranquilla, arepa and tamale from Santander, ternera a la llanera (mamona) from the Llanos

Colombian cuisine is a culinary tradition of six main regions within Colombia: Insular, Caribbean, Pacific, Andean, Orinoco, and Amazonian. Colombian cuisine varies regionally and is influenced by Indigenous Colombian, Spanish, and African cuisines, with a slight Arab influence in some regions.

== History of Colombian food ==
Colombian food is a unique blend of indigenous, European traditions, and Afro-Caribbean influences. The two largest indigenous groups prior to European conquest were the Tairona, who lived along the Caribbean coast, and the Muisca, who lived in the highlands to the South. Arepas, made from ground corn, is one of the oldest cooked dishes in Colombian cuisine and a popular modern dish. It is believed that the name derives from the word for corn in the Chibcha languages.

== Regional cuisines ==
Natural regions of Colombia: Insular Region Caribbean Region Pacific Region Andean Region Orinoquía Region Amazon Region

Colombian dishes and ingredients vary widely by region; however, some of the most common ingredients include an endless variety of staples: cereals such as rice and maize; tubers such as potato and cassava; assorted legumes; meats, including beef, chicken, pork, and goat; and fish and other seafood. Colombian cuisine also features a wide variety of tropical fruit.

Among the most representative appetisers and soups are sancocho de gallina (chicken soup with root vegetables), of beef, of pork ribs or triphasic, sancocho of fish, the ajiaco (potato and corn soup), patacones (fried green plantains), and buñuelos (Christmas season deep fried dough balls).

Representative snacks and breads are arepas (corn cakes), tortas de choclo, almojábanas, pandebonos, aborrajados (fried sweet plantains with cheese), empanadas, and mogollas.

Representative main courses are bandeja paisa, lechona tolimense, tamales, and fish dishes such as arroz de lisa, especially in coastal regions where suero, costeño cheese, peto costeño made from white corn, kibbeh, and carimañolas are also eaten.

Representative side dishes are papas criollas al horno (roasted Andean potatoes), papas chorreadas (potatoes with messy cheese), and arroz con coco (coconut rice). Organic food is a current trend in big cities, although in general, the country's fruits and vegetables are very natural and fresh.

Representative desserts are natillas, bocadillo made of guayaba (guava jelly), cocadas (coconut balls), casquitos de guayaba (candied guava peels), torta de natas, obleas, flan de arequipe, roscón, milhoja, brevas (preserved in syrup) con arequipe, and tres leches cake (sponge cake soaked in 3 types of milk).

Typical sauces are hogao, a tomato onion sauce, and ají, a spicy raw cilantro-based sauce used as a condiment for many dishes and sides, which can be used for most foods. Ají sauce comes in many different varieties based on region and ranges from a sweet flavour to very spicy. Ají picante can range from 30,000 to 50,000 Scoville.

Some representative beverages are coffee (tinto), aromáticas, champúss, cholados, luladas, avena colombiana, sugarcane juice, aguapanela, chocolate caliente, and fresh fruit juices (often made with sugar and water or milk as batidos).

There are a large variety of dishes that take into account the differences in regional climates. For example:

- In Bogotá and the Andean region of the Altiplano Cundiboyacense, ajiaco is the traditional dish. It is also a type of soup made with chicken and potatoes and flavoured with a locally grown, subtle herb called "guasca". Caldo de costilla, or caldo de res, is a beef broth soup made with beef ribs, corn, and potatoes, and is often consumed for breakfast on cold mornings.
- In the city of Medellín, the typical dish is bandeja paisa. It includes beans, rice, ground meat, or carne asada, chorizo, fried eggs, arepa, and chicharrón. It is usually accompanied by avocado, tomatoes, and special sauces.
- In the city of Cali, the most traditional dish is "sancocho de gallina", a soup composed mostly of chicken, plantains, corn, coriander, yuca root, and other seasonings. Sancocho is usually served with a portion of rice, tostadas (fried plantains), a chicken leg covered in hogao (a tomato and onion sauce), and a slice of avocado. The city is also known for its empanadas (a fried corn dough filled with potatoes and meat), marranitas or puerquitas (a fried ball of plantain filled with chicharron, also known as pork rinds), pandebono (a delicious cheese bread made with yucca dough), and aborrajados (sweet, ripe fried plantains filled with cheese and served with guava paste).
- On the Caribbean coast, spicy dishes, including fish and lobster, can be found. Coconut rice is a common dish in coastal cities. The cuisine of the Caribbean is also influenced by Arab traditions, with dishes such as Kibbeh.
- In the Andean region of Santander's (Norte de Santander and Santander), the cuisine of these region has, among others, the Santander mute, the exotic culona ants, the Prochilodus magdalenae (bocachico), the Pseudoplatystoma magdaleniatum (bagre), and cebollitas ocañeras.
- In the Tolima region, the Tamales Tolimenses are a delicacy. These tamales are made of corn dough and feature peas, carrots, potatoes, rice, chicken, pork, and various spices. They are wrapped in plantain leaves and boiled for three to four hours. Pandebono is eaten for breakfast with hot chocolate.
- In the Andean region of Nariño, a traditional dish is broiled guinea pig (cuy asado), influenced by Inca cuisine.
- In the Llanos, barbecued meats, such as the "ternera llanera", and river fish like the "amarillo", are commonly eaten.
- In the Amazonas, the cuisine is influenced by Brazilian and Peruvian traditions.
- Inland, the dishes reflect a mix of Amerindian and European cuisine and use the products of local agriculture, cattle farming, and river fishing. Such is the case with the sancocho soup in Valledupar and Arepas, a corn-based bread-like patty. Local species of animals, like the guartinaja, are part of the Wayuu culture.
- On the Islands of San Andres, Providencia, and Santa Catalina, the main dish is rondon, a seafood dish made of coconut milk, fish, conch, cassava root (yuca), sweet potato, white yams, and pumpkin, seasoned with chilli peppers and herbs. They also have crab soup, which is considered a delicacy and is made with the same ingredients as rondon but without the fish.

Piqueteaderos are rustic eateries that serve a variety of fried foods and specialties on platters to share. Offerings can even include huesos cerdos (pig bones) and tarta de seso (brain pie), as well as fried dishes, morcilla, corn on the cob, and other foods common to Colombia.

== Dishes and foods ==
=== Appetizers and side dishes ===
Name	Image	Description
Aborrajado		deep-fried plantains stuffed with cheese
Arepas		ground maize dough divided into balls and pan-fried or grilled corn cakes
Arroz con coco		rice with coconut and raisins
Butifarras soledeñas		sausage from Soledad, Atlántico
Carimañola		yuca fritter stuffed with ground meat, onion and seasonings
Chicharron		deep fried pork rind
Chunchullo		pig, lamb, cow's small intestine
Empanadas		small fritters, made with a mixture of shredded meat, pork, beef, or chicken
Hogao		criollo sauce The image contains: a table with patacones and hogao
Hormigas culonas		large roasted ants, a santandereanas food from Colombia's Santander Department
Lentil soup (Sopa de lentejas)		a standard meal in many Colombian kitchens. The basic method is to soak the lentils for a few hours before adding chopped onion, garlic, and sometimes diced or grated carrots. It is then served with avocado, rice, tomato, and sweet plantain
Patacones		green plantain fried or deep fried squished and fried
Pepitoria santandereana		rice pepitoria from Santander featuring goat kid blood
Queso blanco		white cheese, also referred to as queso fresco
Suero		a topping similar to sour cream
Tamale		a typical Colombian preparation that has many regional variants

=== Pastries and baked goods ===
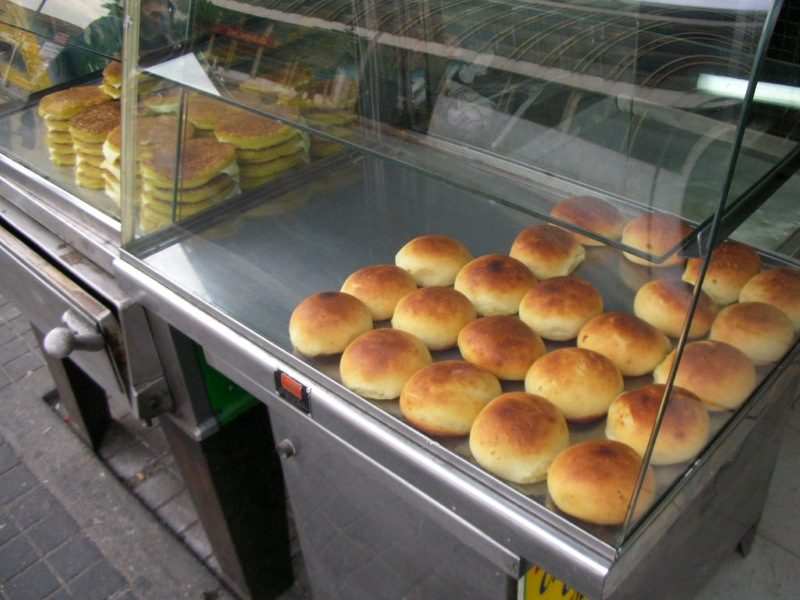
Almojábana.

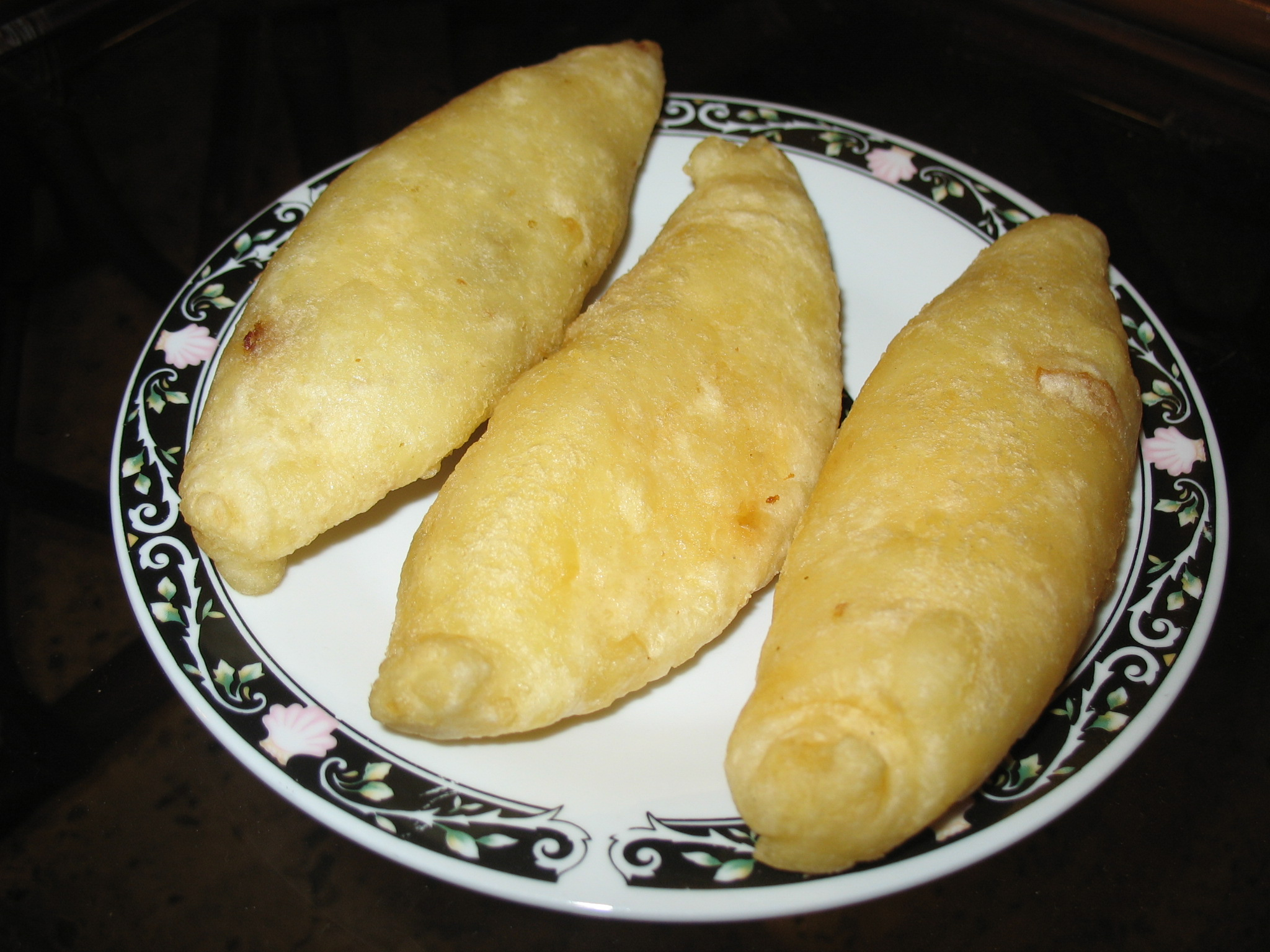
Carimañola.

- Achira are made from achira flour (native to the region) instead of wheat flour
- Almojábana, small cheese buns made with corn flour and cuajada
- Bollos (tubes of ground maize -similar to Italian polenta- or from scratched mandioc/cassava, served with coastal cheese and sometimes whey or butter)
- Buñuelos deep-fried dough balls made on Christmas season
- Carimañolas (like empanadas but made up of manioc)
- Garullas (corn bread roll)
- Pan de sagú (sago bread)
- Pandebono made with cheese made with cassava flour and Costeño cheese
- Pan de maíz similar to cornbread
- Pan de queso (cheese bread, made with cassava starch, corn flour, cheese, butter, sugar)
- Pan de yuca (baked cheese bread made with cassava flour)
- Roscón (a soft and sweet bagel filled with either Arequipe or guava jam)

==== Varieties of arepa ====
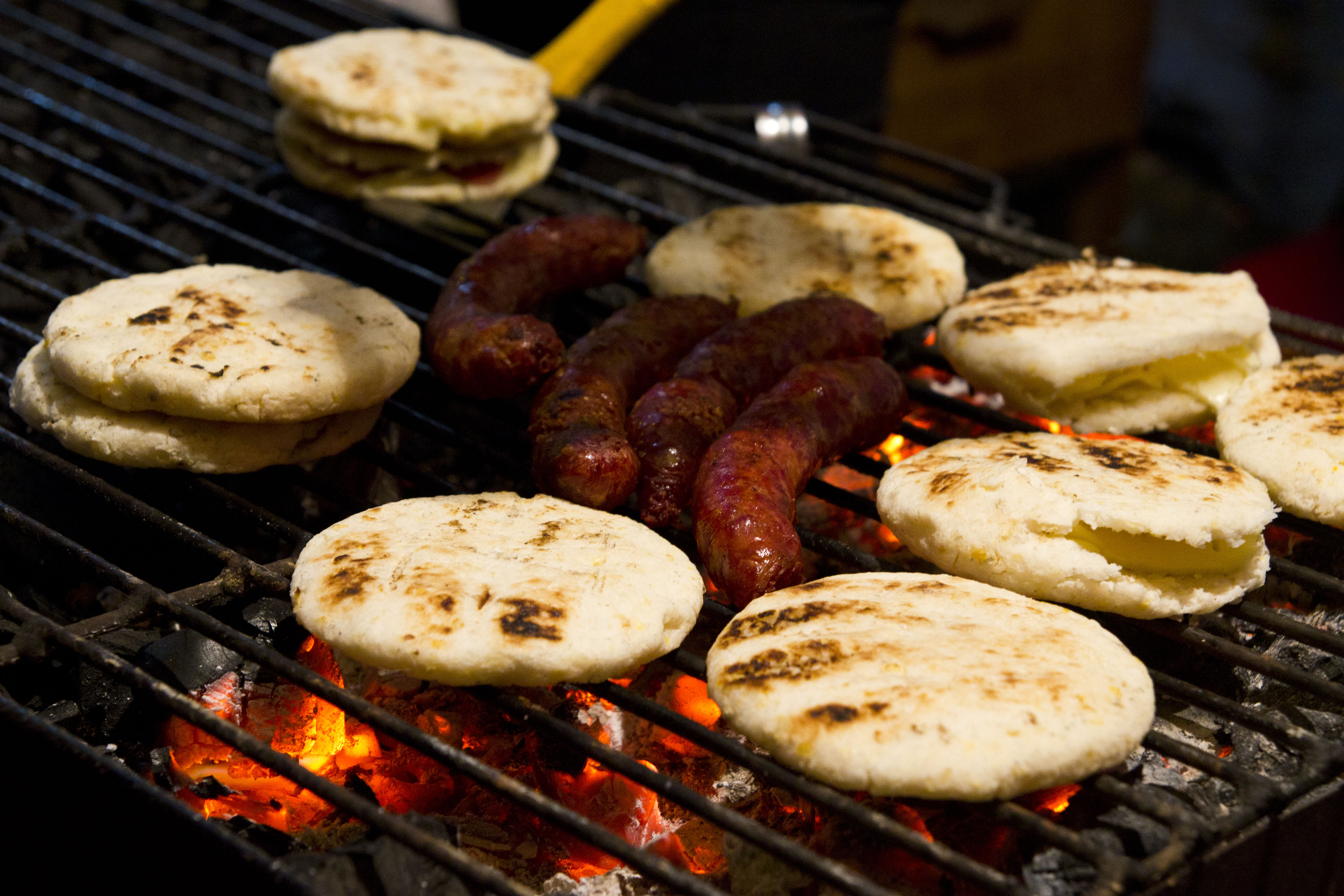
Arepas and chorizo on the grill

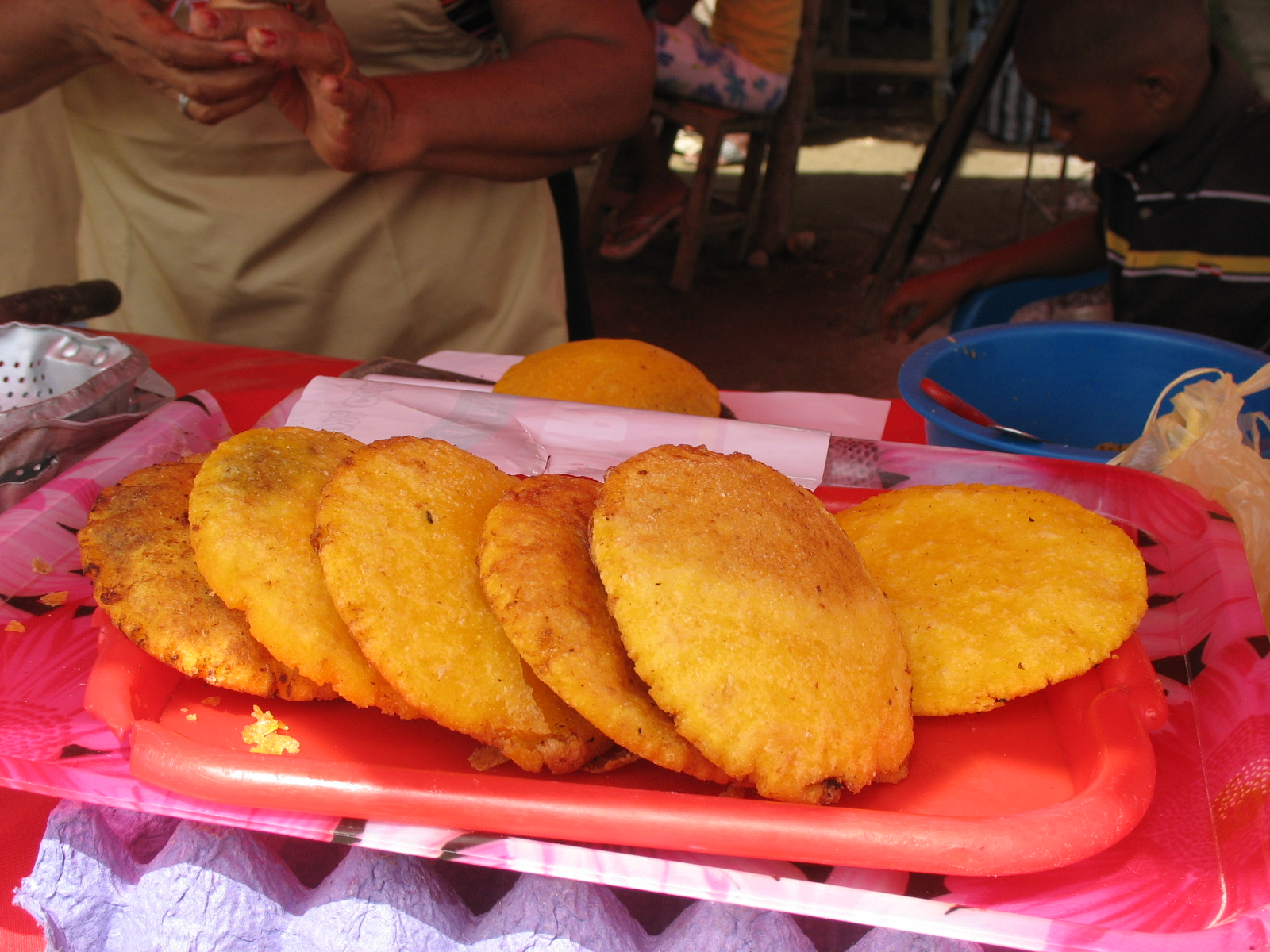
Arepa de huevo

- Arepa boyacense
- Arepa de arroz
- Arepa de huevo
- Arepa de maiz
- Arepa de queso
- Arepa de yuca
- Arepa ocañera
- Arepa paisa (antioqueña)
- Arepa santandereana
- Arepa valluna
- Sweet corn arepa
- Brown rice and sesame seed arepa
- Rice arepas (oreja de perro)

=== Fruit ===
Colombia is home to numerous tropical fruits that are rarely found elsewhere. Several varieties of bananas include a very small, sweet version. Other fruit varieties grown in Colombia include apple, pear, grape, blackberry and strawberry.

Fruit and juice stands are found across Colombia, particularly on the Caribbean coast. Being a tropical country, Colombia produces a large variety of fruits, such as:

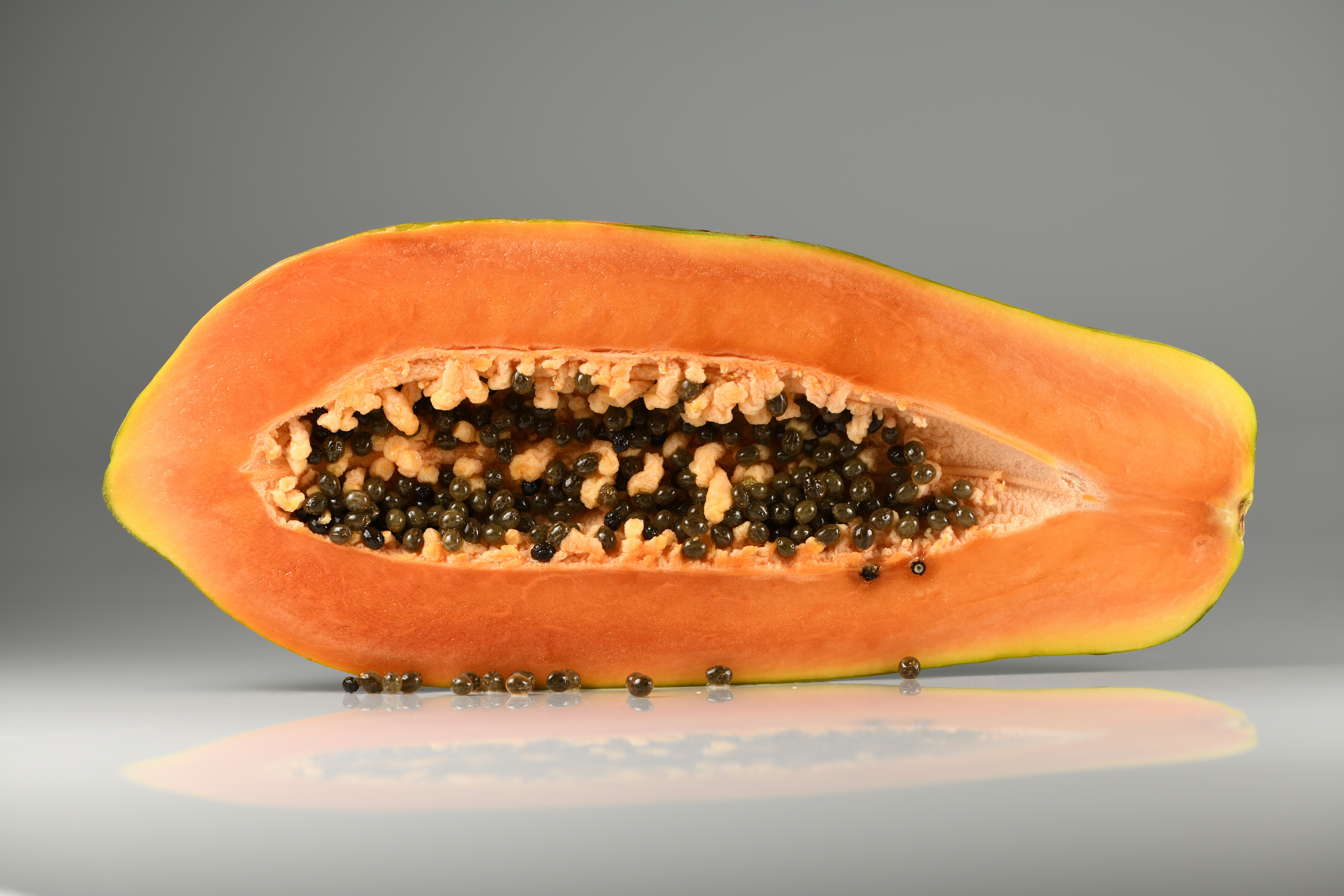
Carica papaya. Longitudinal section of the papaya fruit.

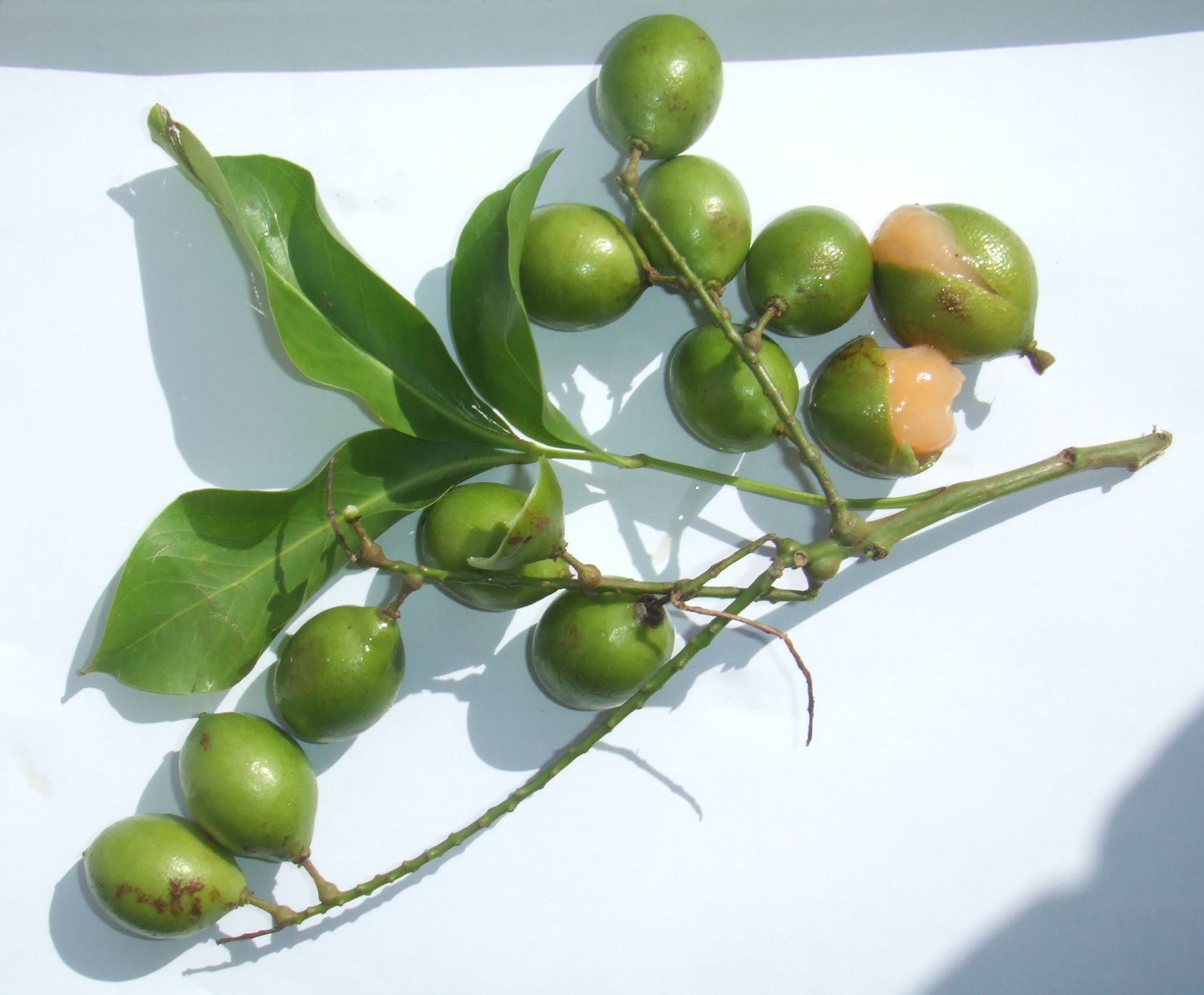
Melicoccus bijugatus, mamoncillo

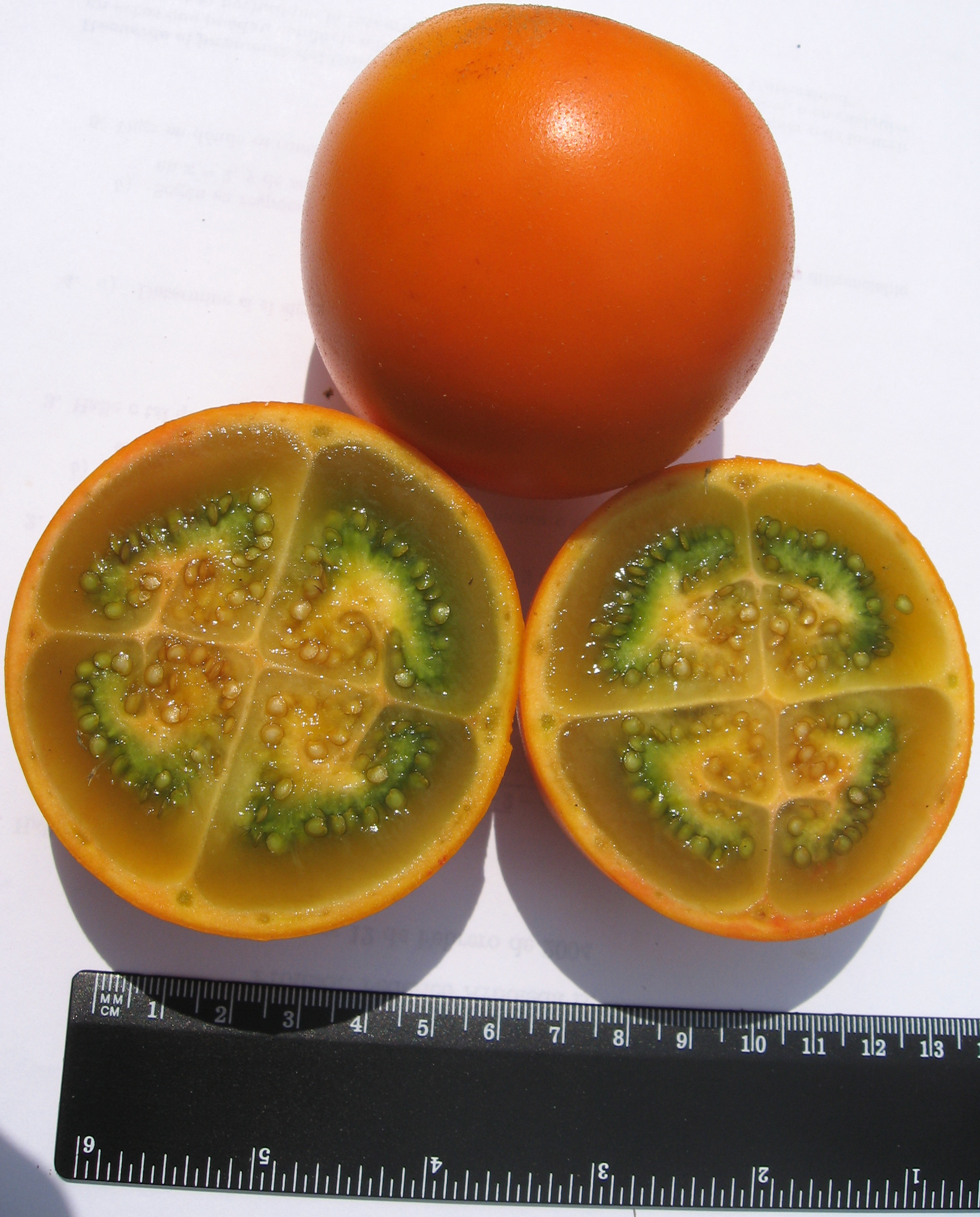
Solanum quitoense, lulo

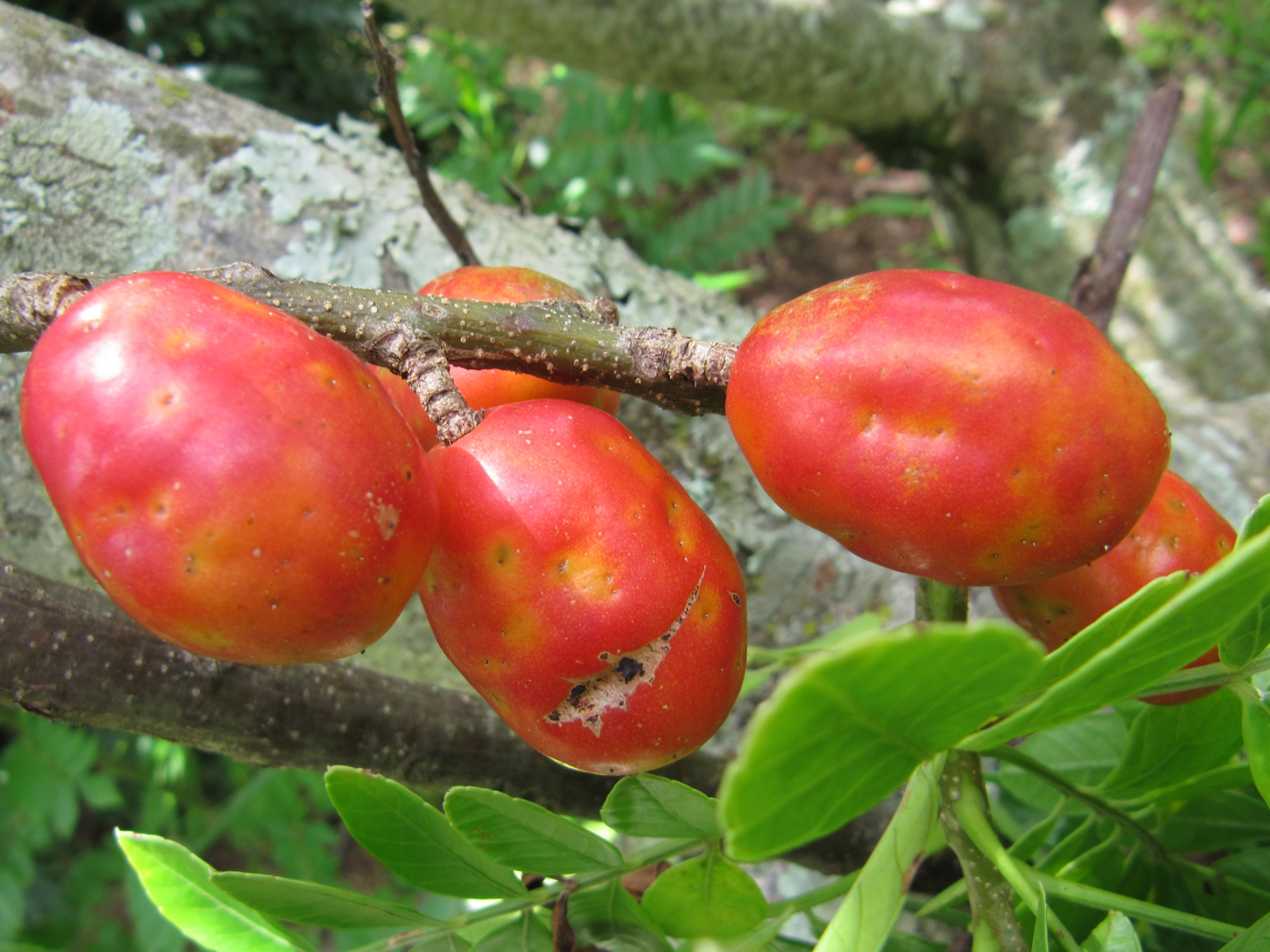
Spondias purpurea, ciruela or cocota

- Annona cherimola, cherimoya (chirimoya)
- Annona muricata, soursop (guanábana)
- Annona squamosa, sugar-apple (anón)
- Acrocomia aculeata (tamaca)
- Aiphanes horrida (corozo)
- Bactris gasipaes, peach-palm (chontaduro)
- Banana, murrapos, mini-banana (banano),
- Borojoa patinoi (borojó)
- Carambola, starfruit (carambolo)
- Carica papaya (papaya)
- Cashew (marañon)
- Citrullus lanatus, watermelon (sandia or patilla)
- Citrus × aurantiifolia, key lime, acid lime (limero or limonero)
- Citrus × latifolia, Persian lime (limón Tahití)
- Citrus × limon, lemon (limón)
- Citrus reticulata, mandarin orange (mandarina)
- Citrus × sinensis, orange (naranja)
- Cocos nucifera, coconut (coco)
- Eugenia stipitata, araçá-boi (arazá)
- Feijoa sellowiana, pineapple guava (feijoa)
- Garcinia mangostana, Mangosteen (mangostino)
- Inga edulis, ice-cream-bean (guama)
- Mango
- Manilkara zapota (níspero)
- Melicoccus bijugatus (mamoncillo)
- Passiflora edulis, passion fruit (maracuyá)
- Passiflora ligularis, banana passionfruit (granadilla)
- Passiflora quadrangularis (badea)
- Passiflora tarminiana, banana passionfruit (curuba ecuatoriana)
- Passiflora tripartita (curuba)
- Persea americana, avocado (aguacate)
- Physalis peruviana, cape gooseberry (uchuva)
- Pineapple (piña)
- Piñuela
- Pitaya, dragon fruit (pitahaya)
- Pouteria sapota, mamey sapote (zapote costeño)
- Psidium cattleyanum, strawberry guava (arazá rojo)
- Psidium guajava, apple guava (guayaba)
- Psidium guineense, guinea guava (guayaba agria)
- Quararibea cordata (zapote sudamericano)
- Rubus glaucus, blackberry (mora)
- Solanum quitoense, naranjilla (lulo)
- Spondias purpurea (Ciruela or cocota)
- Strawberry (fresa)
- Syzygium jambos, malabar plum (pomarrosa)
- Tamarindus indica, tamarind (tamarindo)
- Tree tomato, tamarillo (tomate de árbol)
- Vasconcellea pubescens, mountain papaya (papayuela)

=== Main courses ===
- Arroz con Pollo consists of seasoned rice, chicken, and a variety of vegetables.
- Bandeja Paisa, a traditional dish from Antioquia, and the "Eje Cafetero", which consists of white rice, red beans, ground beef, plantains, chorizo, morcilla, chicharron, arepa, avocado, and a fried egg. Along with Ajiaco, the bandeja paisa is considered one of the national dishes.
- Cocido boyacense, culinary preparation from the Altiplano Cundiboyacense.
- Cuchuco, a thick soup made of wheat, fava beans, potatoes, ribs, and peas, is from Boyacá. Also barley or corn soup.
- Cuy asado, broiled guinea pig, accompanied by potatoes and popcorn. It is the traditional dish in Nariño.
- Fritanga is another popular Colombian dish made of meats, fried plantains, chicharrones, and yellow potatoes with aji sauce eaten throughout Colombia. Milanesa is another common meat dish throughout the country.
- Frijolada («frejolada» o «feijoada» in Portuguese) is a robust dish made with a base of pinto or red beans. Frijoles are normally cooked with diced pork or pork hocks, carrots, corn, platano, and sometimes bacon as well. Generally, this dish is also served with rice and avocado. It is often used as a side dish and is always included in the Bandeja Paisa meal.
- Lechona, a traditional dish from the Tolima department, is a mixture of yellow pea purée and pork meat, with a side of rice arepa 'oreja de perro' and corn 'insulzo'.
- Picada Colombiana, chopped specialties served as a combo platter.
- Tamales are corn or corn/rice "cakes" wrapped in plantain tree leaves and steamed. They can be filled with everything from chicken, potatoes, peas, and carrots to rice. The tamales vary in shape and fillings in each region, and almost every region has its own variation. Some well-known variations are from Tolima, Santander, Cúcuta, Bogotá, and Valle del Cauca; just to name a few.

=== Soups ===
- Changua (milk soup with eggs) is a typical breakfast soup of the central Andes region of Colombia, in particular in the Boyacá, Cundinamarca and Santander, including the capital of the country, Bogotá. The dish has Chibcha origins. The broth is served in a bowl with curly cilantro and a piece of hard bread called "calado" that is softened in the changua. Cilantro can be added as an option even while the soup is boiling. Next, add the eggs carefully so as not to break them.
- Caldo de costilla (Spanish for rib broth) is a dish typical of Colombian cuisine from the Andean region. It is made mainly from beef ribs boiled in water with slices of potato, some garlic, onion, and cilantro leaves.
- Locro is a typical dish in the Nariño region. It is a corn, beans, zapallo, and potato stew.
- Mondongo is a very filling traditional Colombian soup, containing a bit of almost everything. The base is made of diced tripe, to which are added several vegetables such as peas, carrots, onions, potatoes, and tomatoes, along with garlic, cilantro, and chicken, beef, and/or pork.
- Mute is a soup from Boyacá, Norte de Santander and Santander. In general, beef rib, parts of pork, tripe, corn and vegetables are used for its preparation.
- Sancocho is a popular soup originating from the Valle del Cauca region. It combines vegetables and poultry or fish with recipes differing from one region to the next, but usually contains yuca and maize and is frequently eaten with banana slices.
- Ajiaco is a traditional Andean soup that originated in Bogotá. It is a chicken, corn, and potato stew with a hint of guasca (Gallant Soldiers), a local herb.

=== Desserts and sweets ===
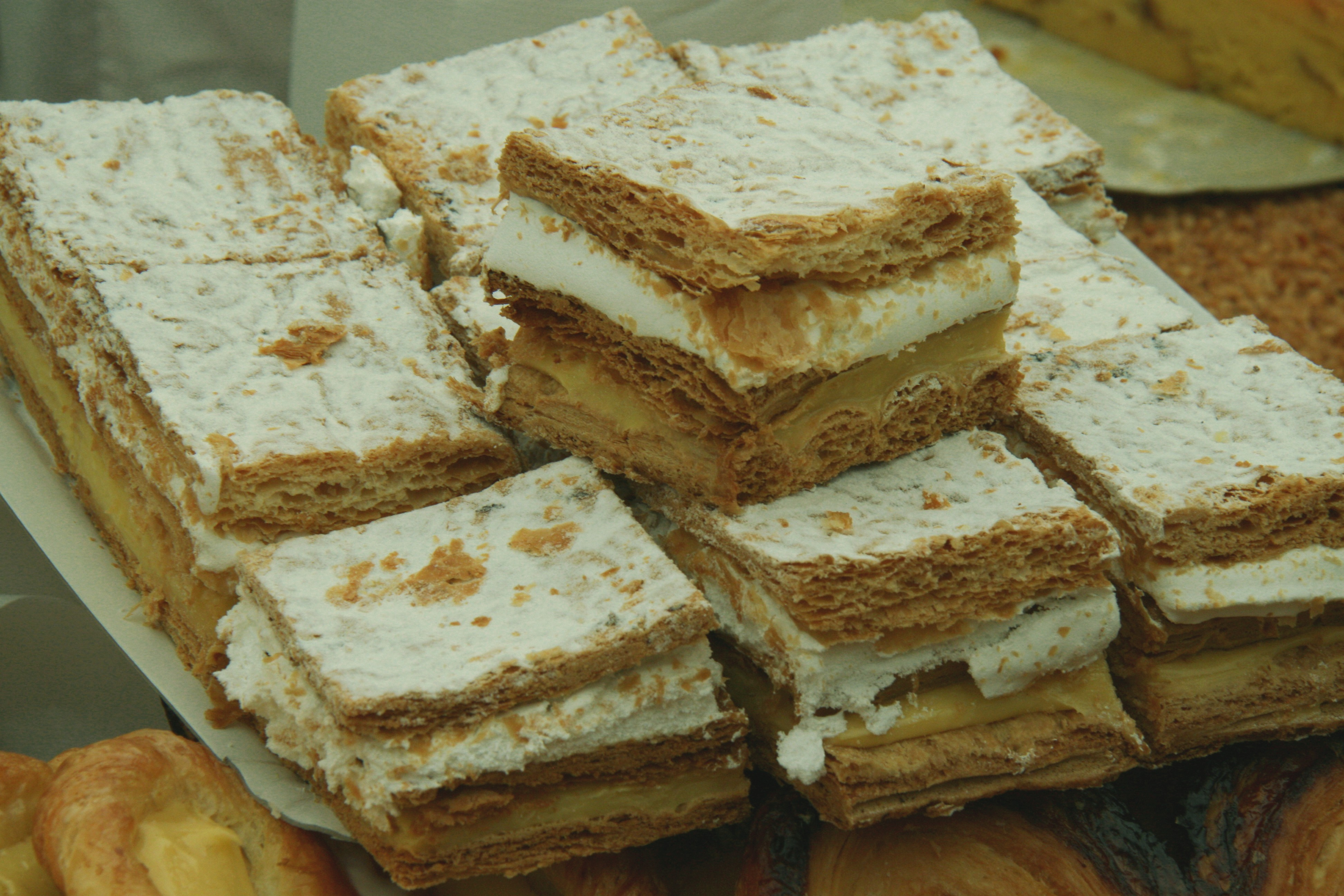
Milhoja

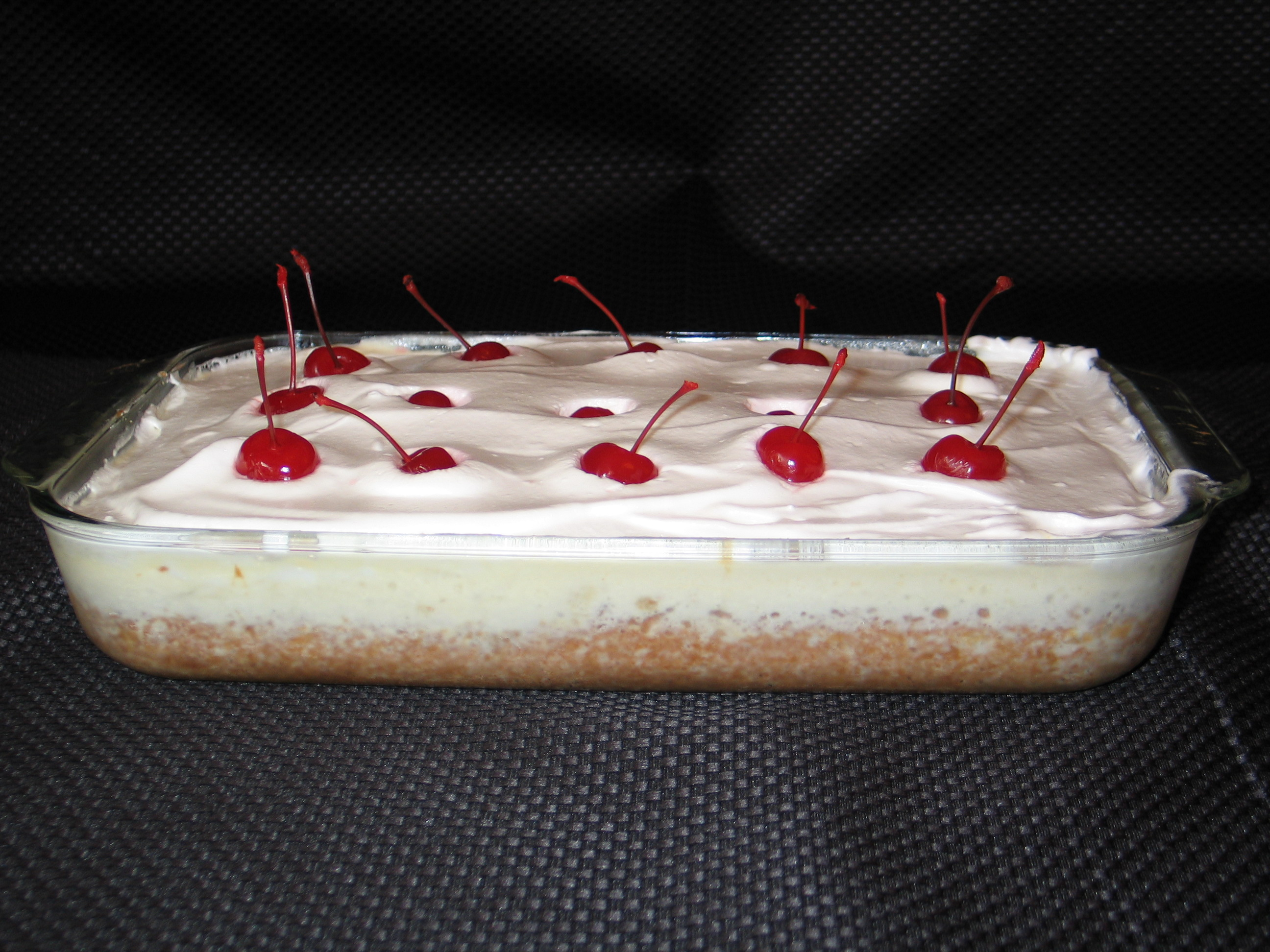
Tres leches cake

- Arequipe is Colombia's version of the Dulce de Leche, a milk caramel.
- Arroz con leche, sweetened rice with milk.
- Bocadillo, guava paste.
- Brevas en dulce, candied figs in syrup, or arequipe.
- Cocadas are baked coconut confections similar to macaroons.
- Enyucado is cake that has grounded cassava.
- Flan is a type of custard dessert.
- Gelatina de pata (Leg jelly ) is obtained naturally from the leg of the beef until the collagen dissolves.
- Leche asada, similar to flan but less sweet, is made with condensed milk.
- Manjar blanco is a boiled, creamy, milk-based spread that is thicker than arequipe and sometimes used as a pastry filling. A nationally recognized presentation is manjar blanco with guava jelly.
- Mazamorra, a white maize drink.
- Melado, a thick syrup derived from panela.
- Merenguitos, little hardened meringue "cookies".
- Milhoja, similar to Mille-feuille or Napoleon (literally means thousand layers).
- Natilla, a Colombian derivation of the Spanish custard natillas, is made with milk, cornflour and spices but without eggs.
- Pastel de Gloria is a puff pastry containing guava jelly or guava paste and sometimes cheese inside, sprinkled with granulated sugar.
- Postre de Natas, a milk-based Colombian pudding, literally means milk skin dessert.
- Torta Maria Luisa, orange cake, and between layers any berry jam, decorated with icing sugar.
- Tres leches cake, "three-milk" cake.
Colombian cuisine

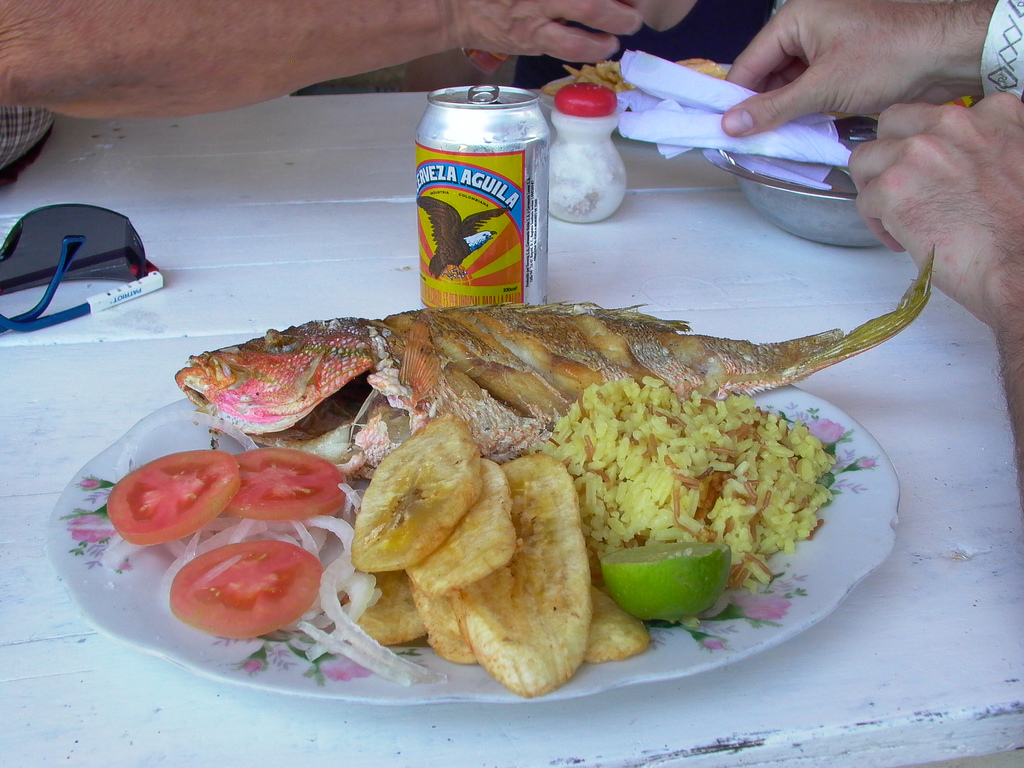
Fried red snapper, fried plantain, rice and tomato

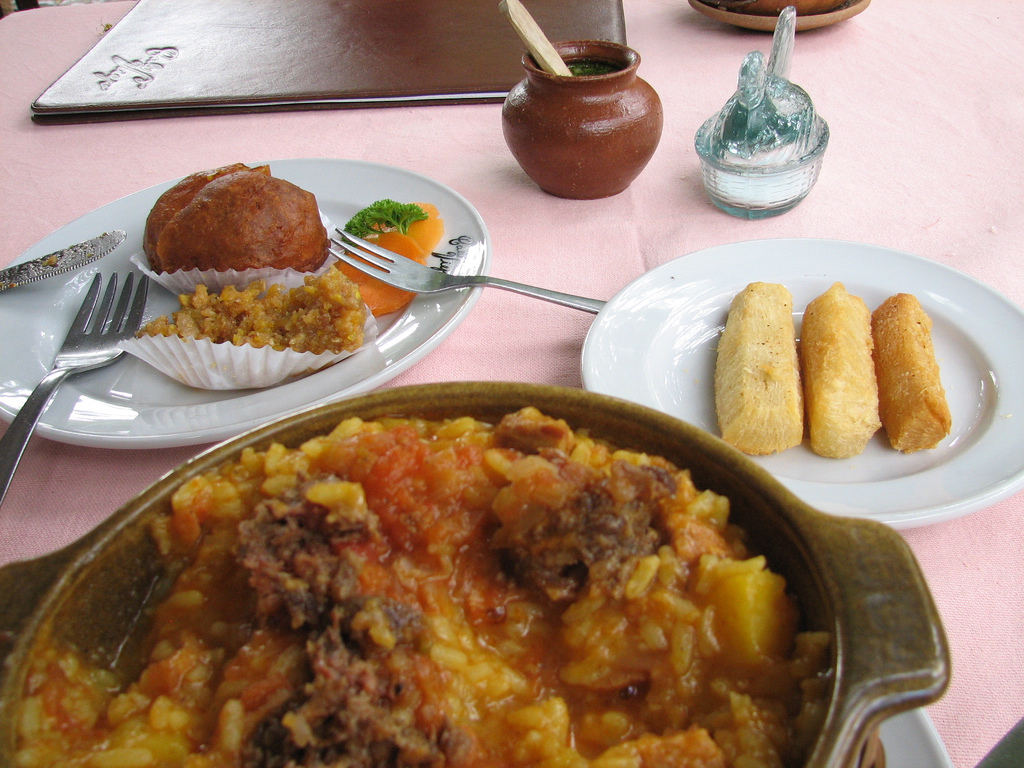
Rice atollao

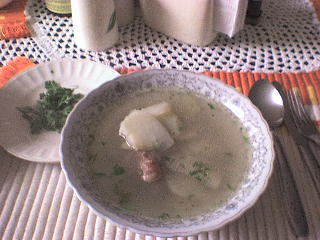
Caldo de costilla served hot and with cilantro leaves

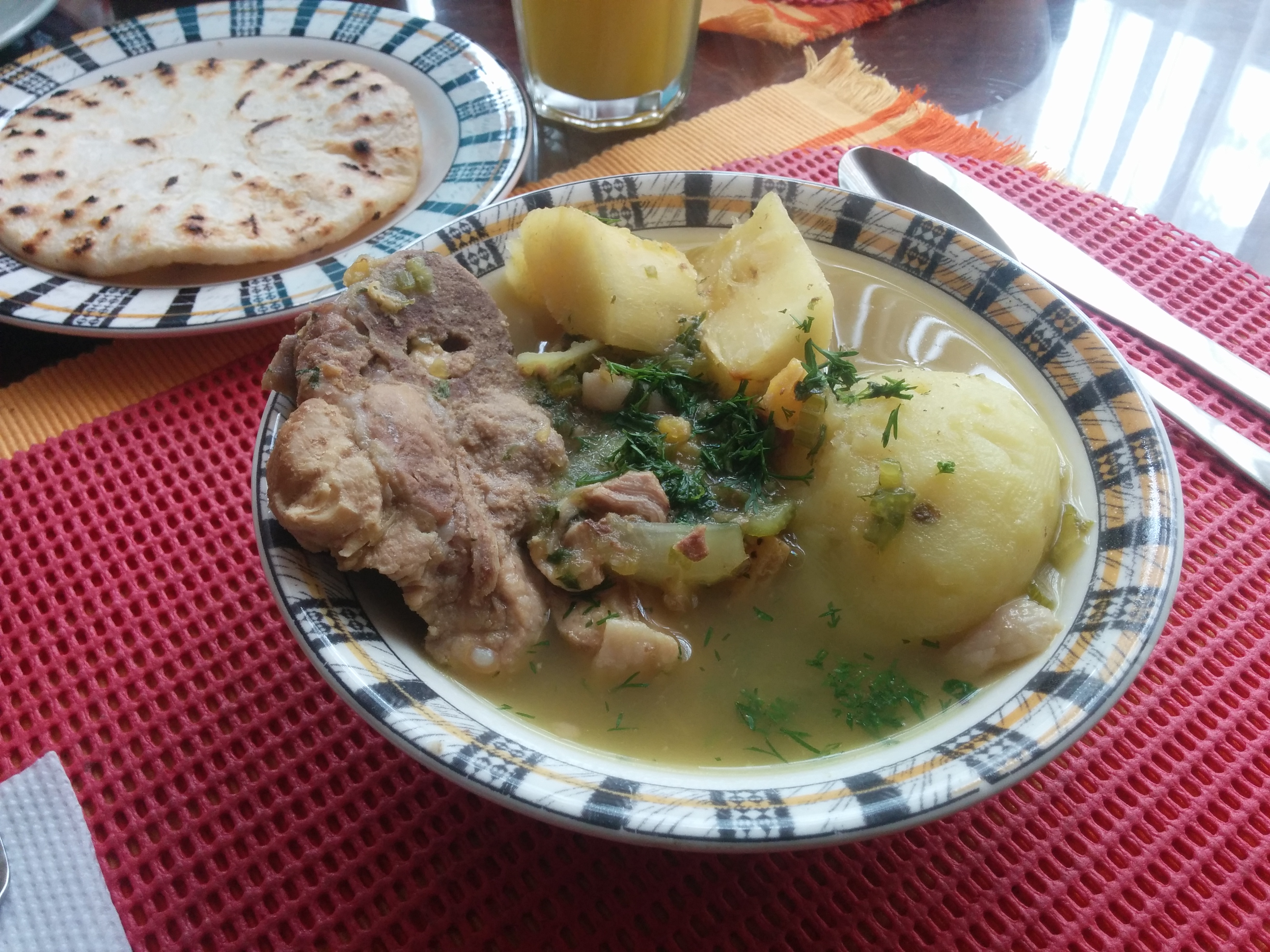
Sancocho of pork backbone

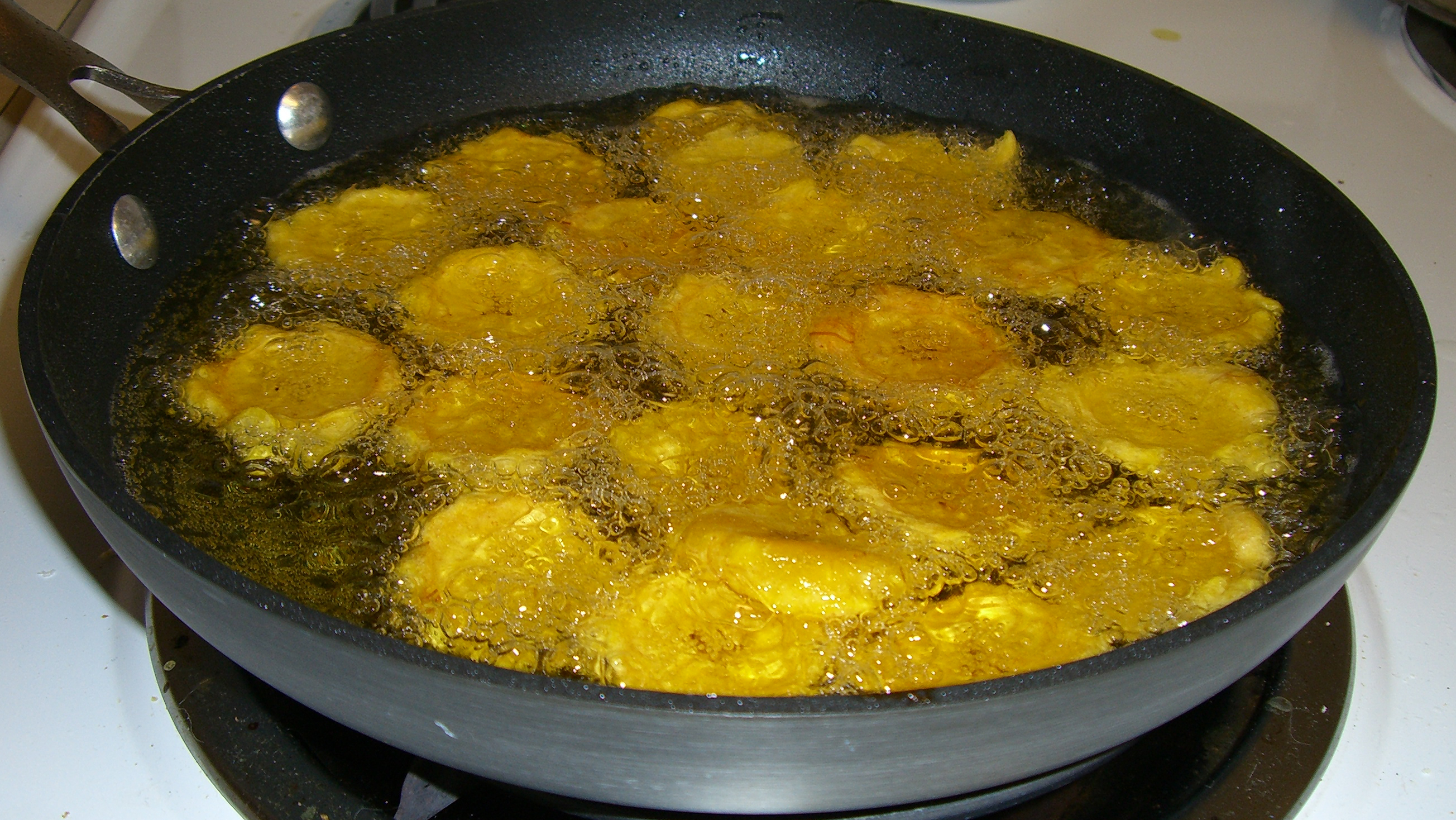
Patacones are twice-fried plantain patties, often served as a side, appetizer, or snack. Here they are being fried for the second time.

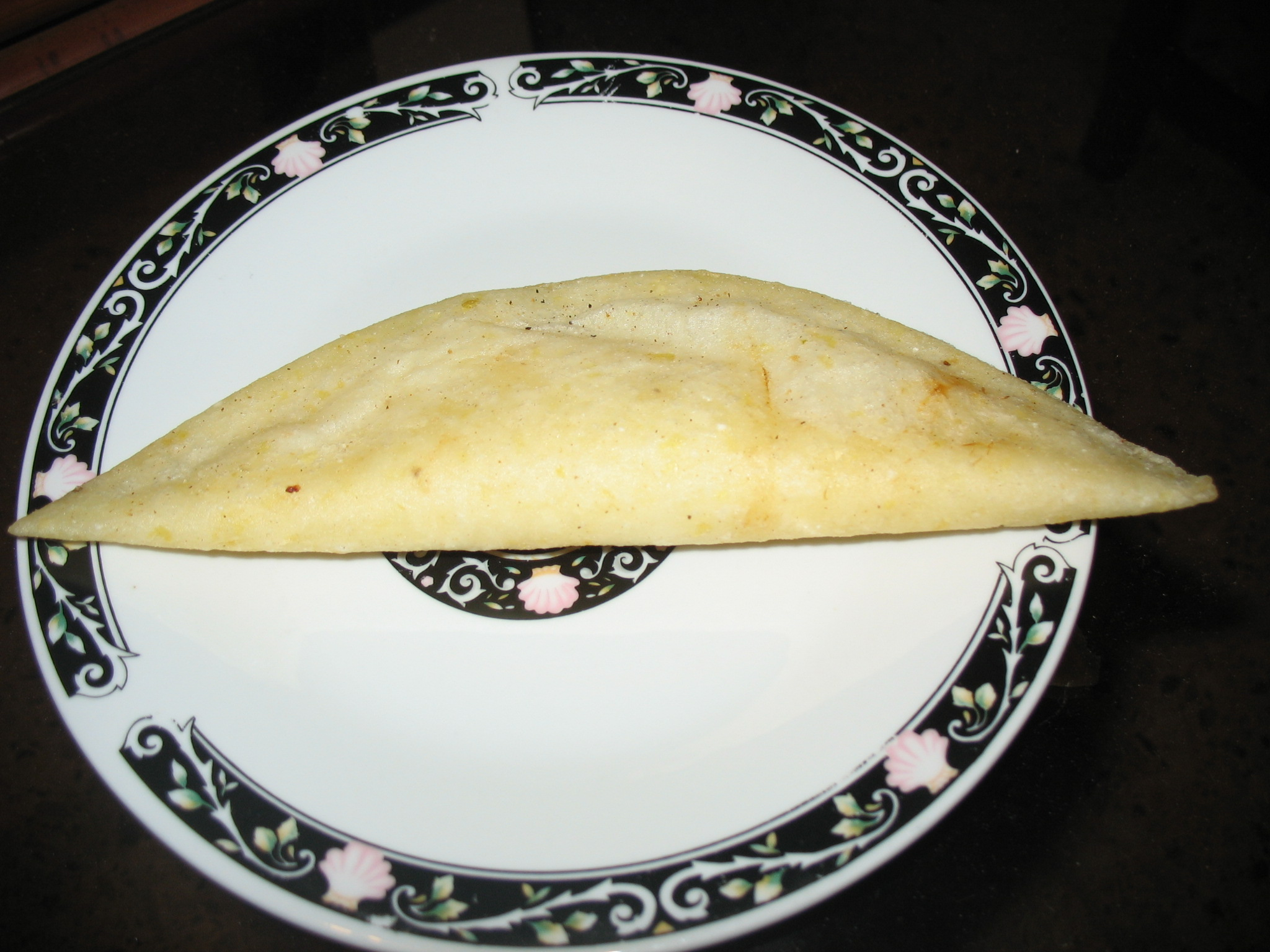
Empanada barranquillera

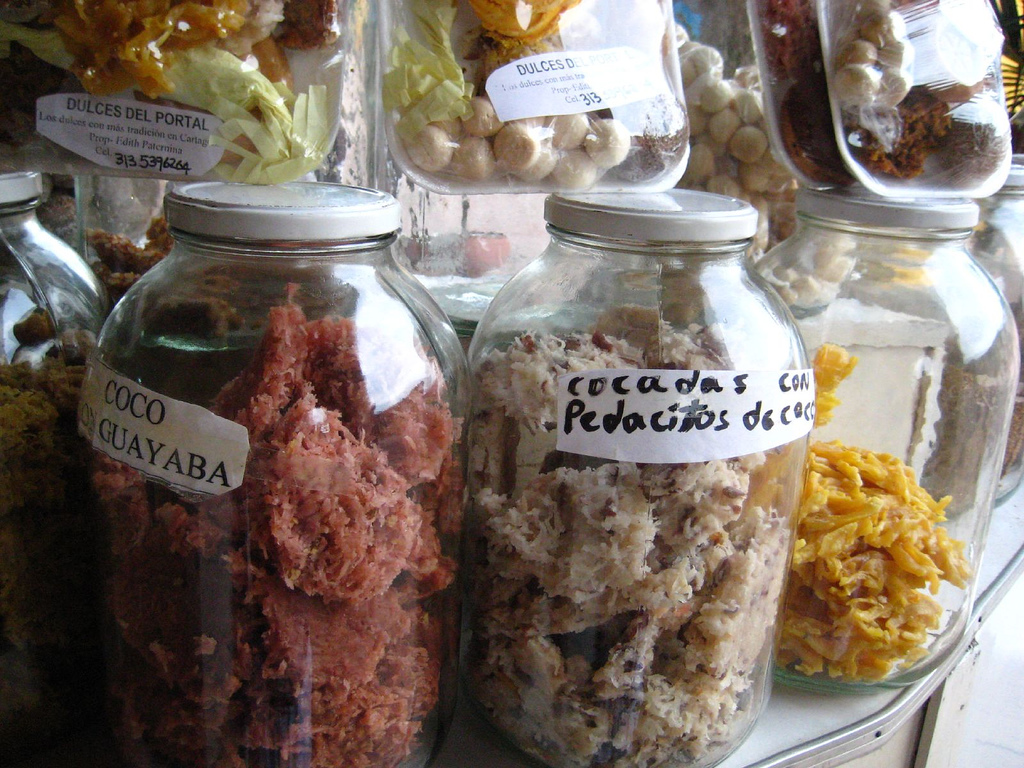
Cocadas

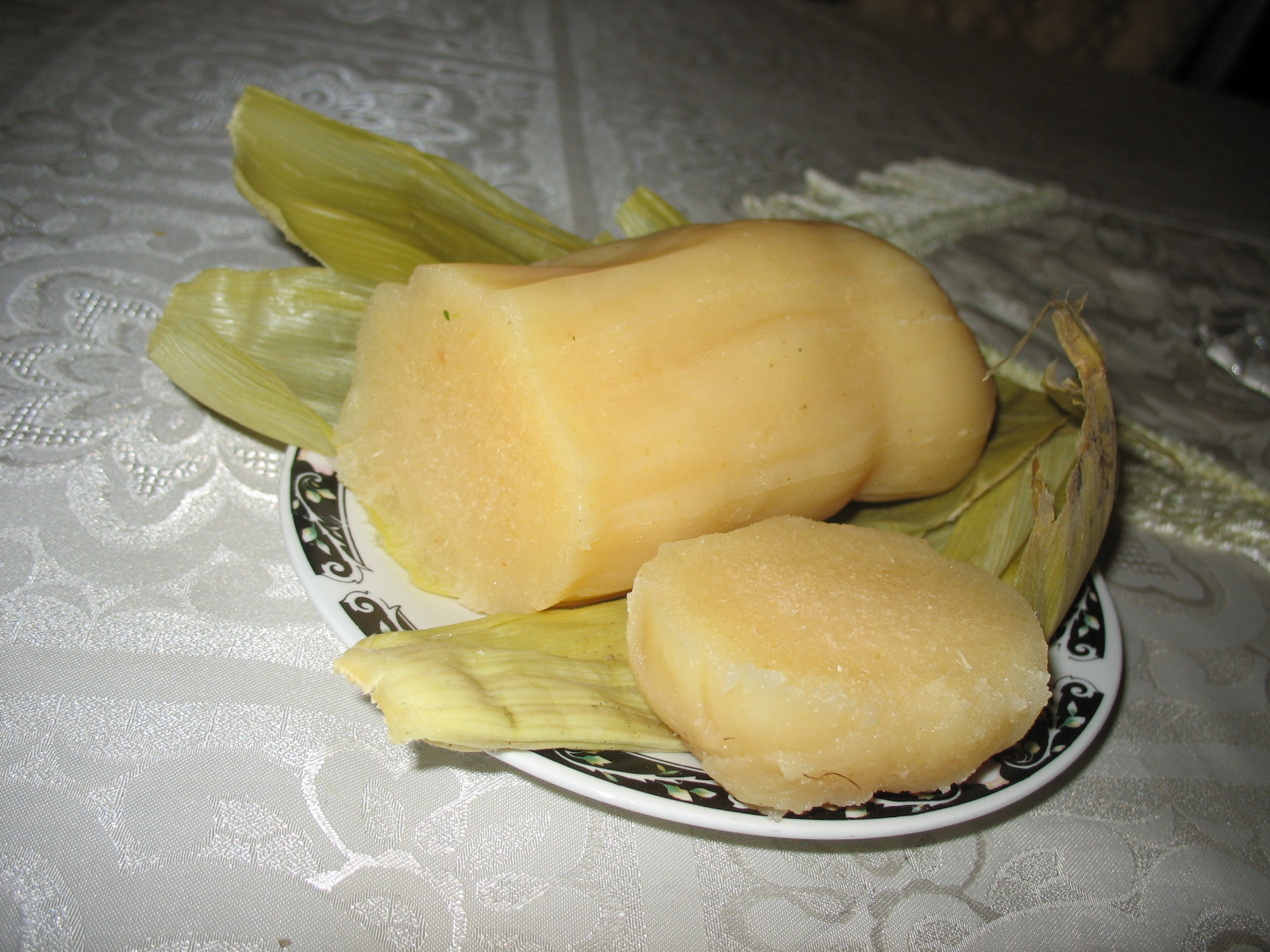
Bollo de yuca

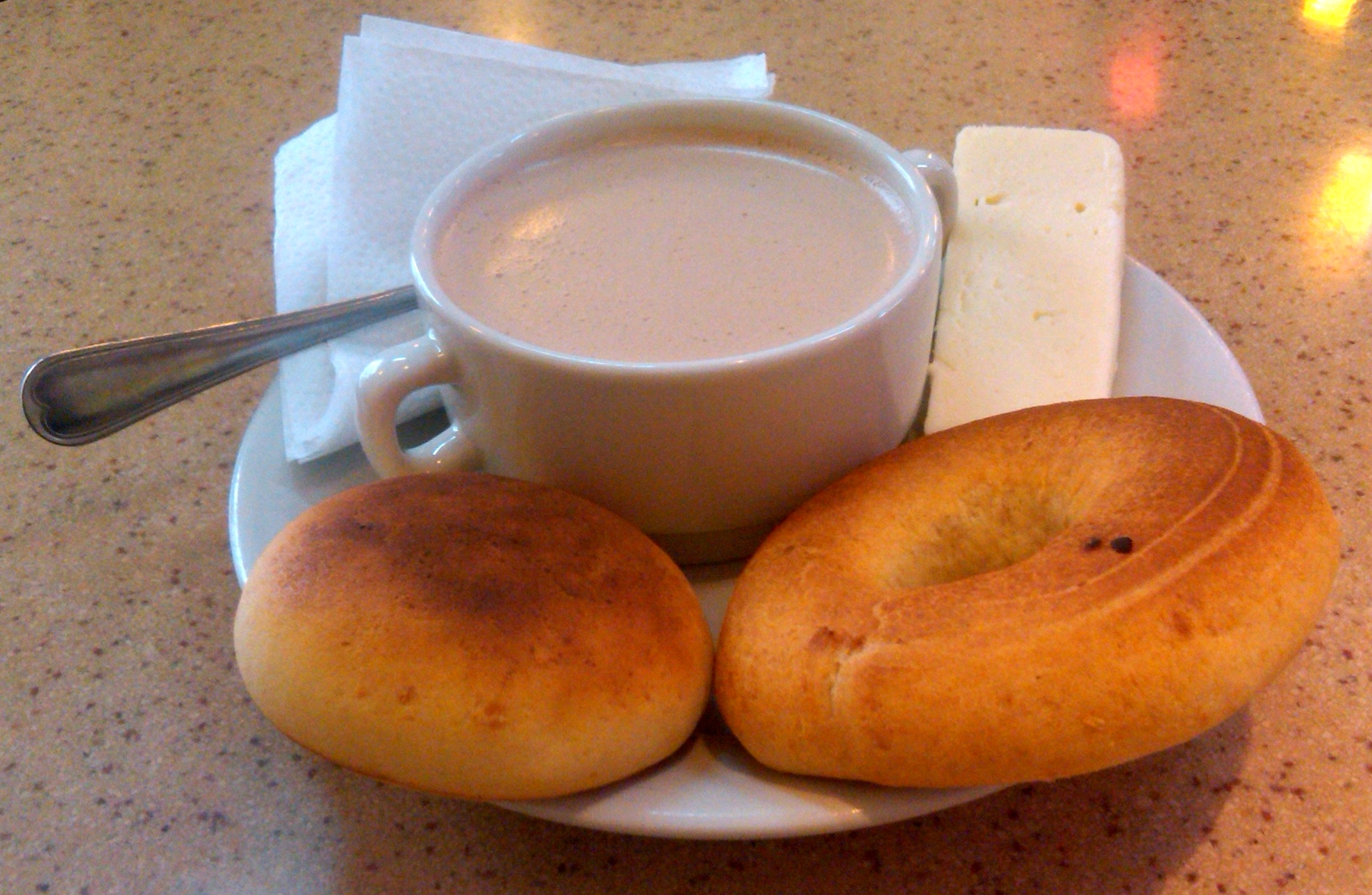
A traditional breakfast of Bogotá: hot chocolate with cheese, almojábanas and pan de queso

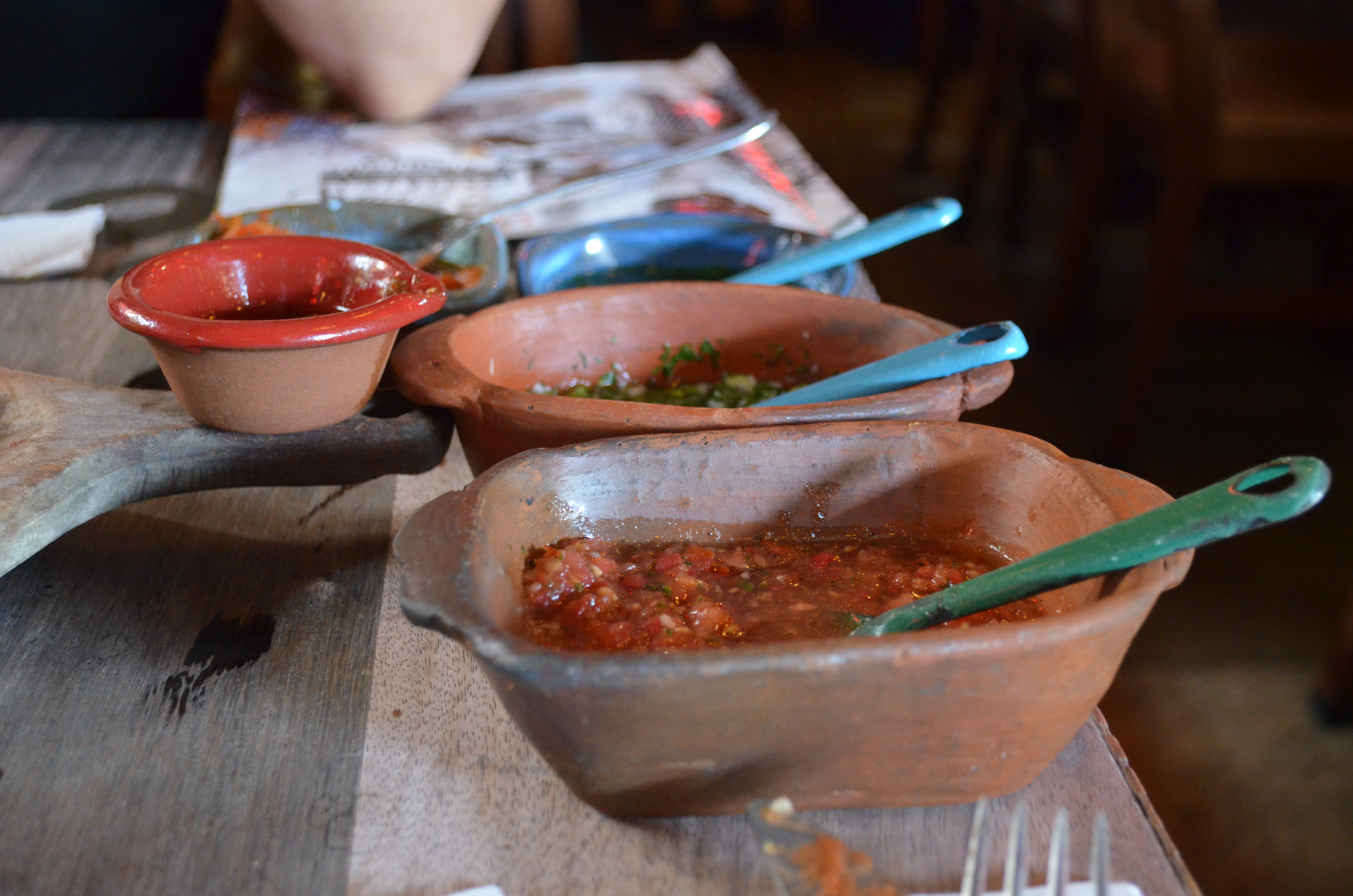
Ají sauce from Bogotá

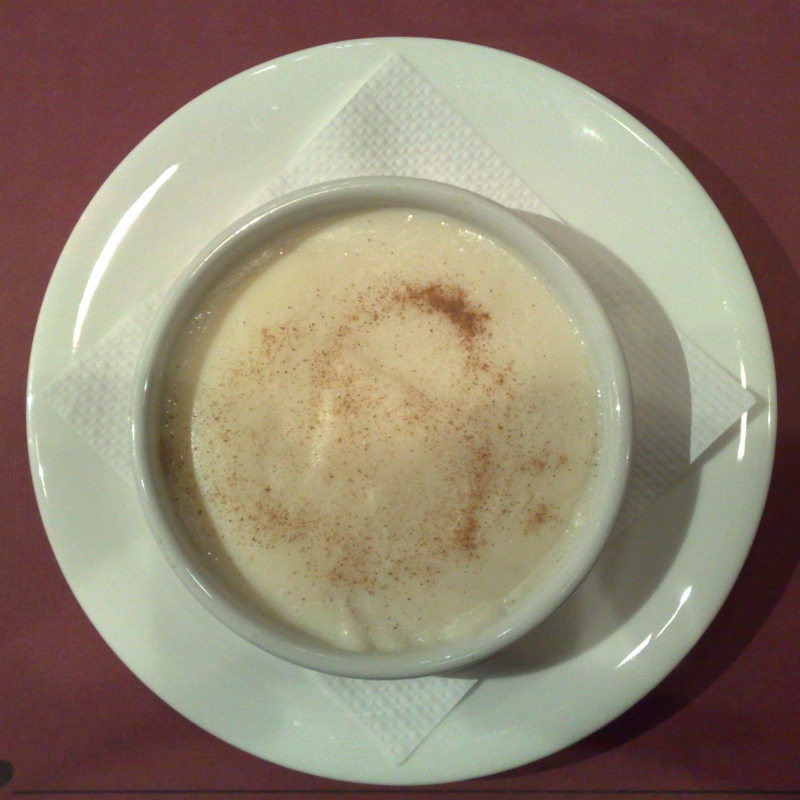
Manjar blanco

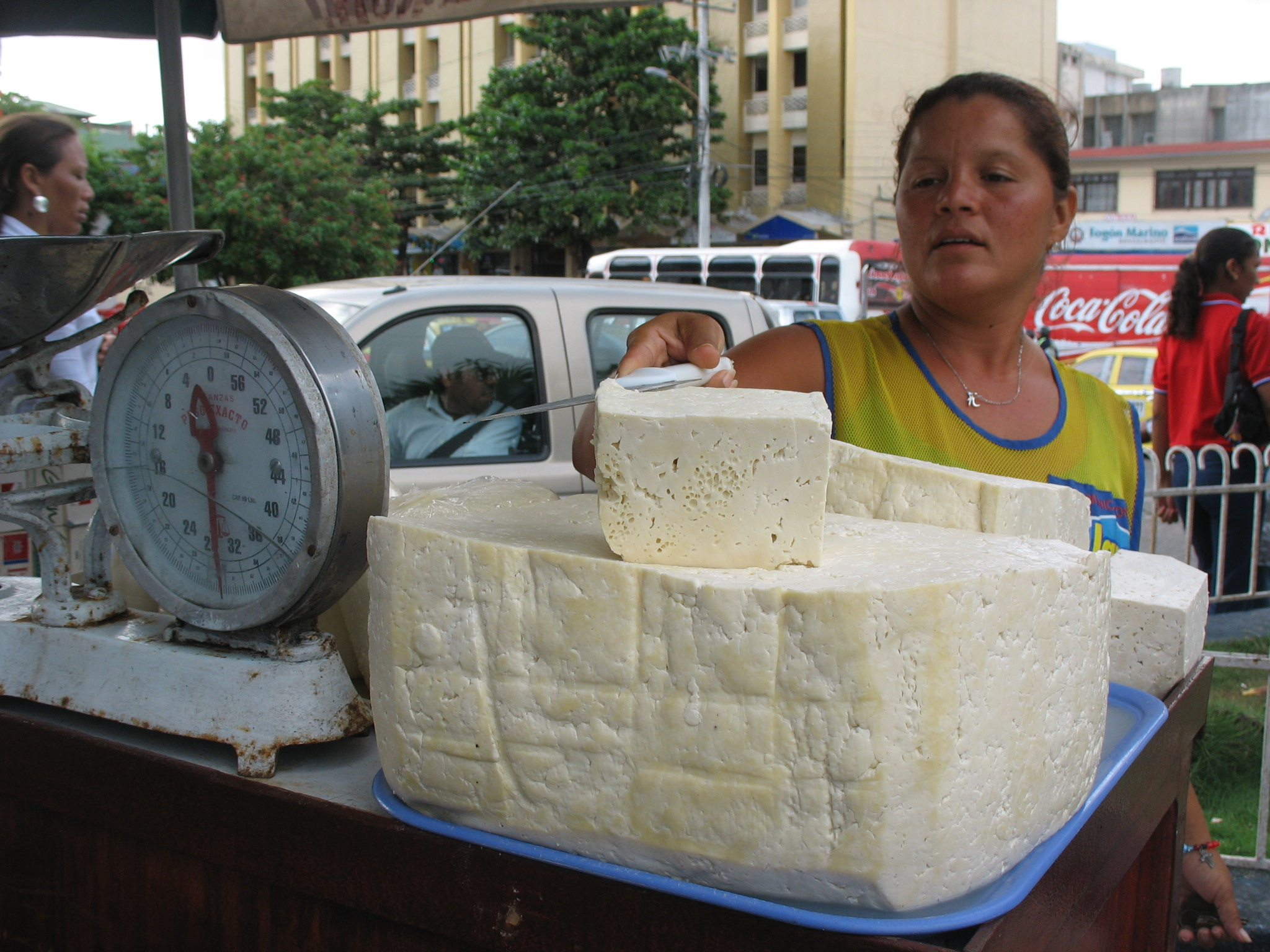
Costeño cheese is originally from the Caribbean Coast of Colombia.

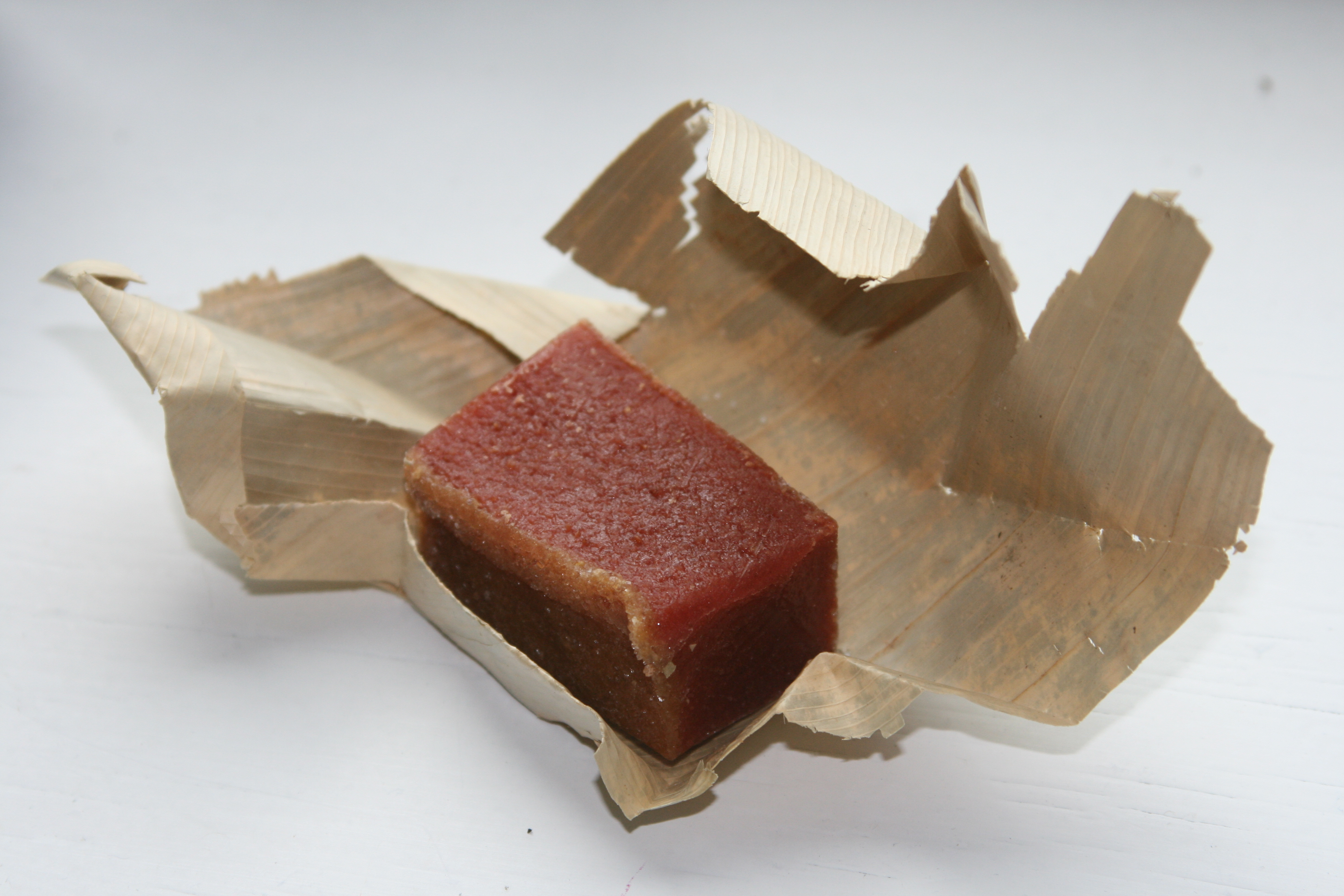
Bocadillo with leaf packaging

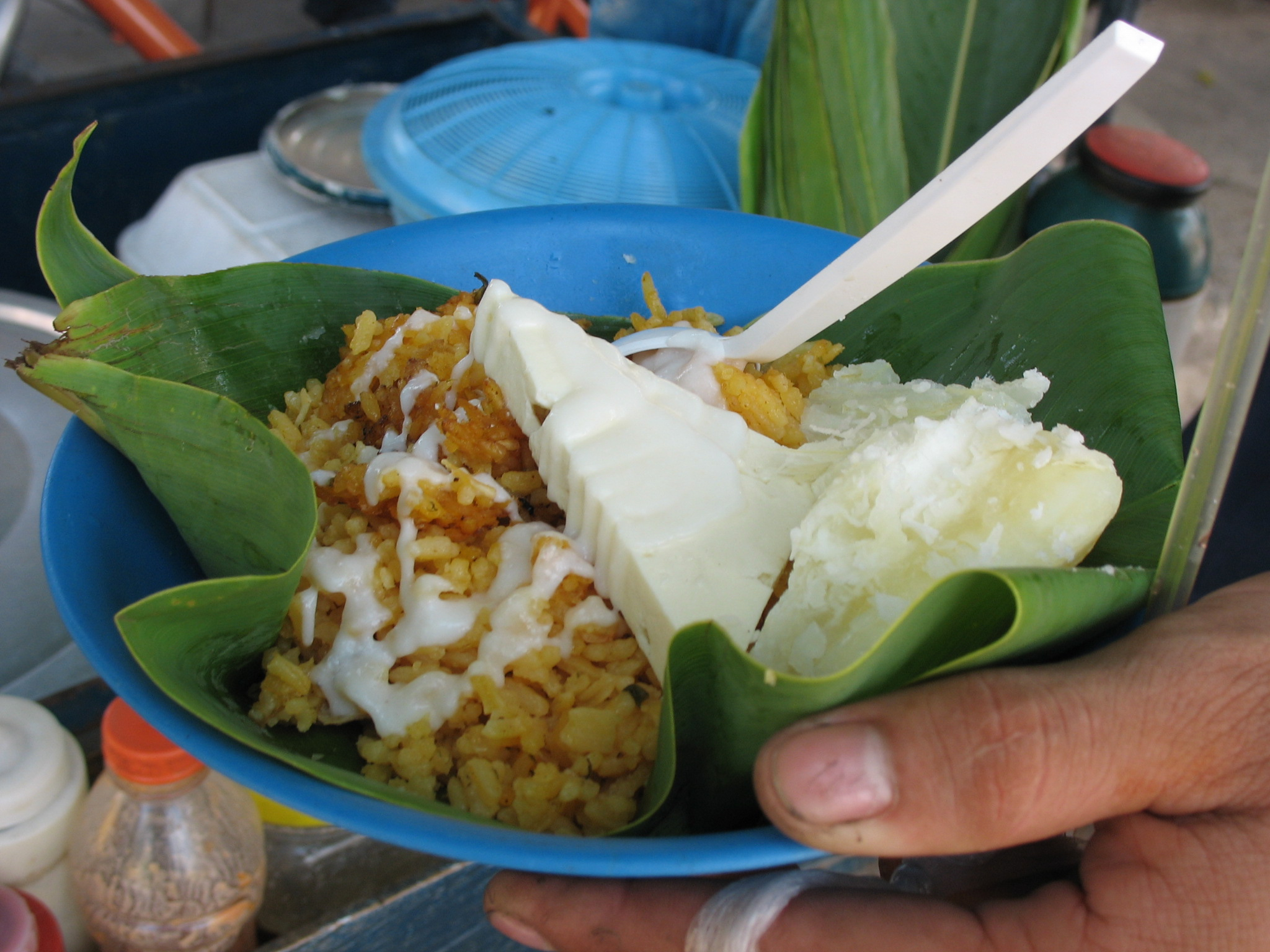
Arroz de lisa

== Beverages ==
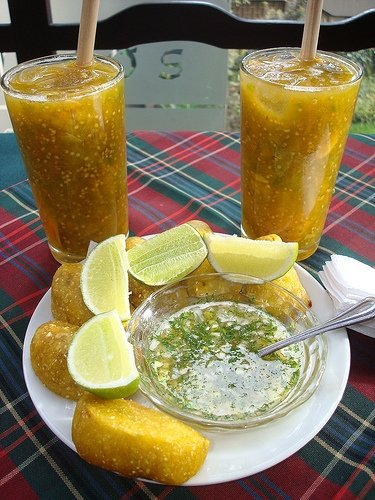
Lulada

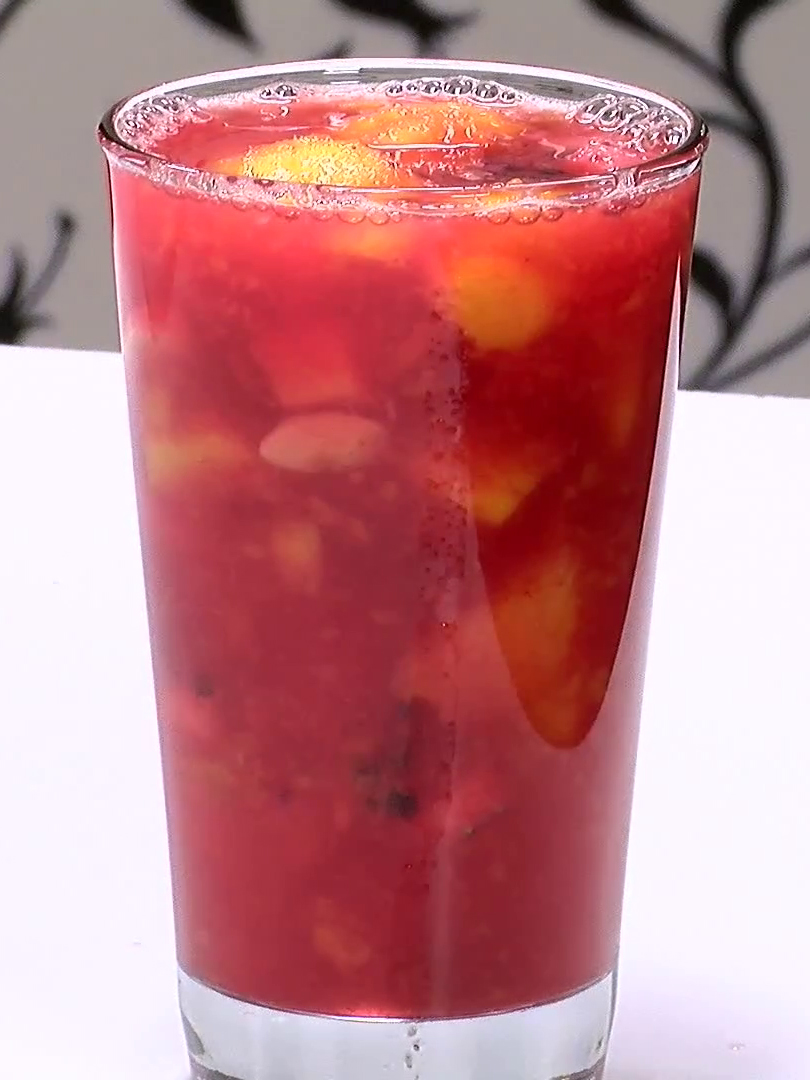
Salpicon of fruit, mixing banana, pineapple, papaya, watermelon, etc.

On a per capita basis, Colombia is one of the world's largest consumers of fruit juices, consuming on average more than three-quarters of a serving each day.

- Aguapanela is made by dissolving panela (a kind of sugarloaf) in water. Lime juice may be added for flavor. It can be served cold or hot. When served hot, it is common for Colombians to put fresh farmer's cheese in their aguapanela for it to melt.
- Aromáticas are hot herbal teas, often served to guests with a little cracker or cookie on the side during social visits.
- Batidos are creamy fruit drinks served cool and made with fruit and milk, occasionally sweetened with sugar. Popular flavours include papaya and blackberry.
- Champús is a thick drink made from corn, pineapple, lulo, and other ingredients.
- Chocolate caliente, or Colombian hot chocolate, is a common breakfast meal made with milk, water, and bars of semi-sweet chocolate. A special metal pitcher (called a chocolatera) is used for heating and pouring, and a utensil called a molinillo–essentially a stick with paddles at the end–is used for stirring and frothing. Colombian hot chocolate often includes cinnamon, cloves, and vanilla and is frequently consumed with sweet bread dipped in it. Fresh cheese is often dropped in to melt and spread on the bread.
- Coca tea, an herbal tea made from an infusion of the leaves of the coca plant is considered a mild stimulant and a remedy for altitude sickness.
- Colombian coffee is known for its quality and distinct flavor. Though much of the world's quality coffee beans come from Colombia, many Colombians commonly drink instant coffee rather than brewed coffee. It is popularly consumed as a "tinto", meaning black with sugar or panela on the side, or as café con leche, which is a preparation of half coffee and half heated milk. In 2011, UNESCO declared the Coffee Cultural Landscape of Colombia a World Heritage Site.
- Colombiana is a kola champagne soda with a particular and different taste (generic trademark).
- Guandiolo is an Afrocolombian drink made with Borojo fruit that has alleged aphrodisiac properties.
- Lulada is a drink originating from Cali. It is prepared from lulo and has the texture and consistency of a smoothie.
- Malta: carbonated malt non-alcoholic beverage (generic trademark).
- Postobón, a variety of soda flavours from the maker of Colombiana, the most popular flavour being apple ("Manzana") (genericized trademark).
- Salpicón (which literally means large splash) is made from diced fruit and soda, usually Colombiana or any Kola flavoured soda. It can also be a fruit cocktail beverage (often made with watermelon or mandarin juice). The traditional fruit one consists of mixing banana, pineapple, papaya, watermelon, etc.
Colombian beverages

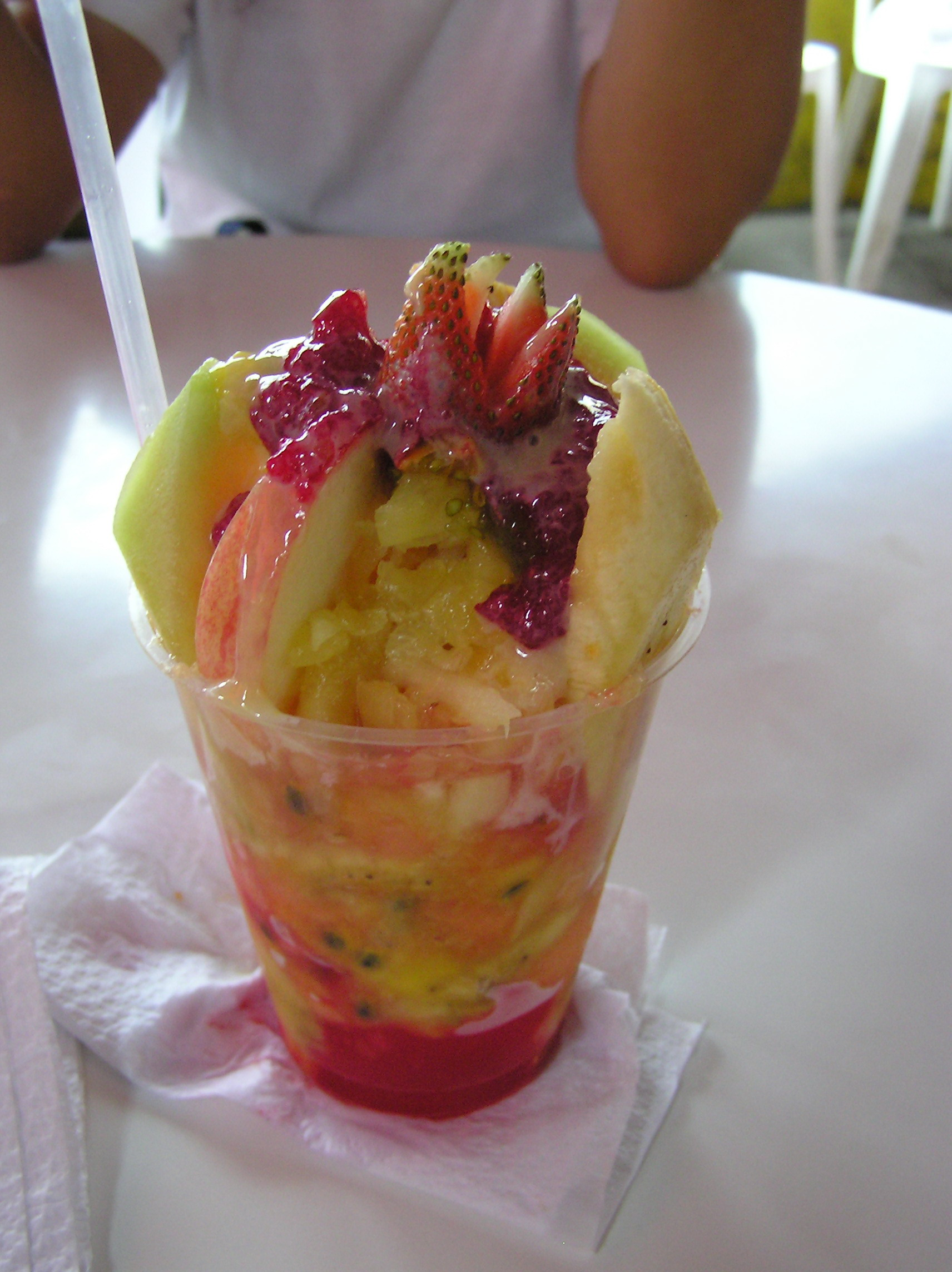
Cholado

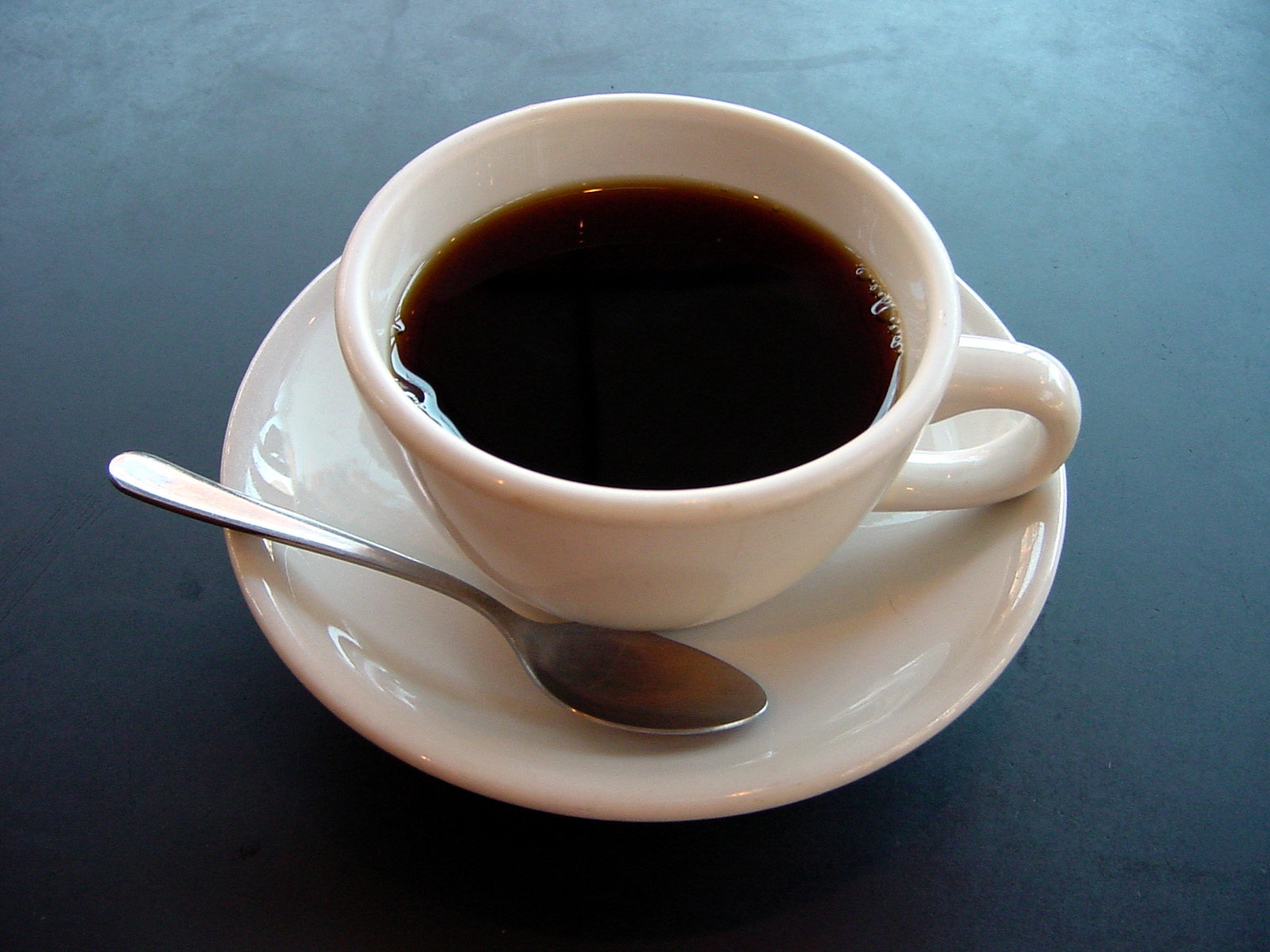
Colombian coffee is known for its quality and distinct flavor.

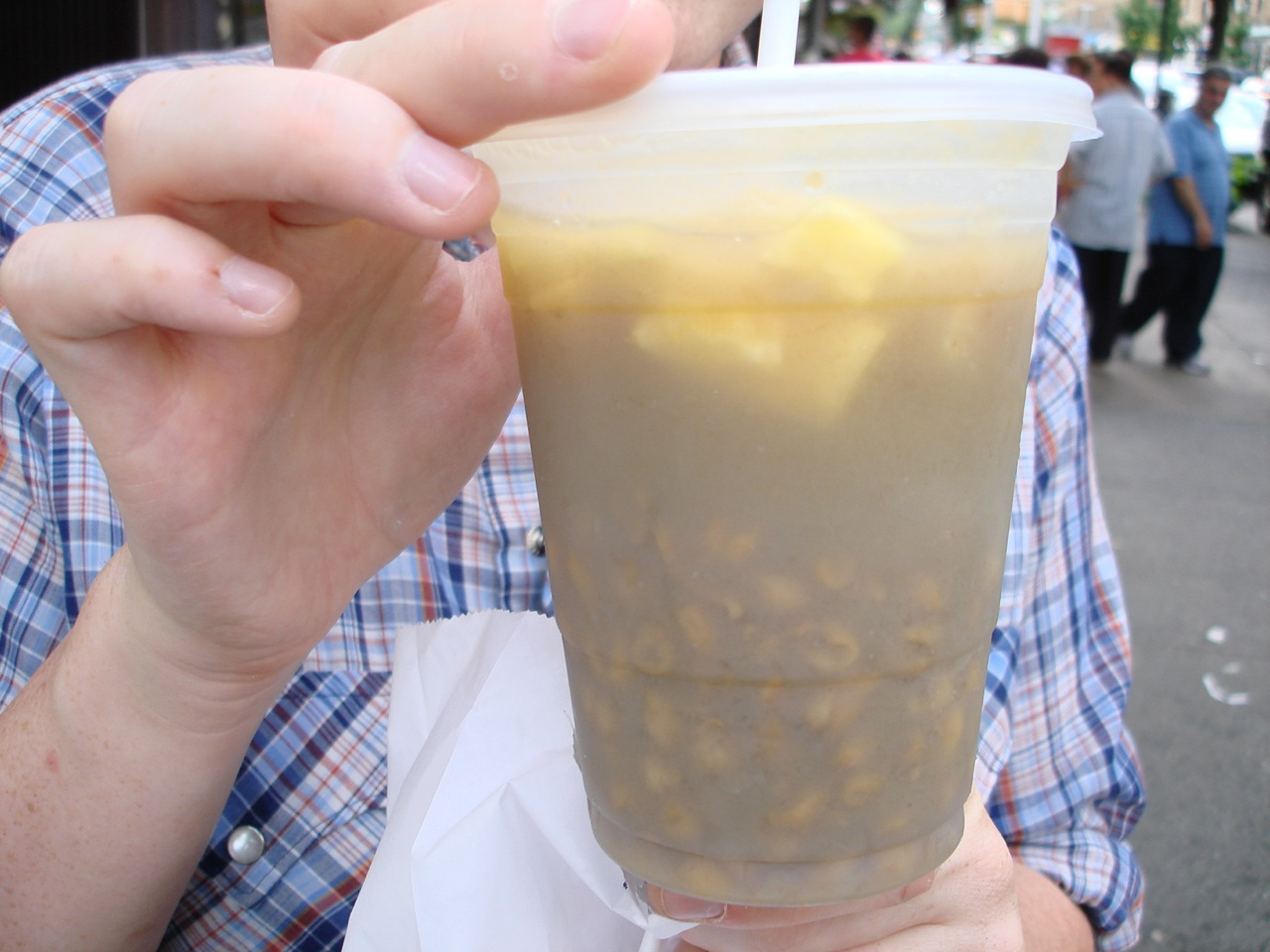
Champús

=== Alcoholic beverages ===
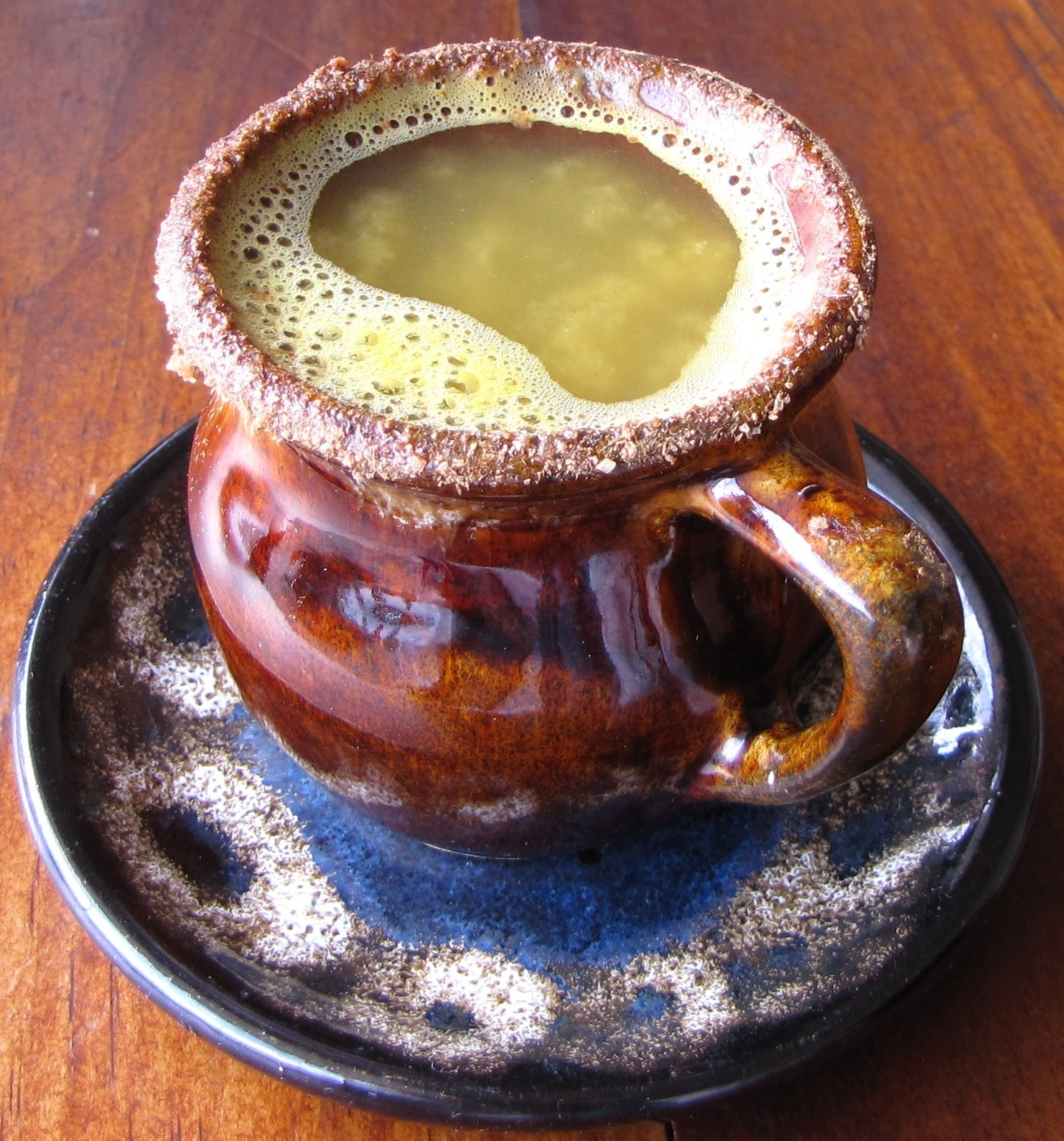
Canelazo

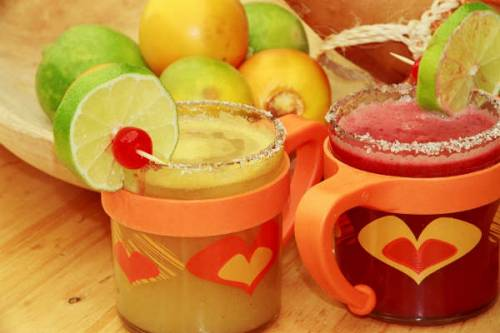
Boileds from Pasto of lulo and blackberry

- Aguardiente is an alcoholic drink derived from sugarcane and flavoured with anise. It is widely consumed at Colombian parties and ranges in potency from 20% to 40%. It is a variation of the Spanish alcoholic drink.
- Canelazo is traditionally an alcoholic version of aguapanela mixed with cinnamon and aguardiente. Sugar is rubbed on the edges of the glass when served.
  - Hervido is a local variety of canelazo, traditional in Nariño. It is often made with fruit juice (typically naranjilla, mora, or maracuyá juice).
- Chapil is a traditional beverage in Nariño.
- Chicha is a formerly forbidden strong alcoholic beverage originally made by the indigenous peoples of the Andes. It can be prepared from virtually everything but is typically made from corn. The corn is cooked and grounded with panela, which is later wrapped in green plantain leaves and left alone for three days until fermented. It is later mixed with water and any chosen flavours, such as orange leaves or spearmint.
- Guarapo is made from various fruits kept in a large ceramic jar and left to ferment. Within that time, panela is added to the liquid to make the alcohol stronger. Grapes and pineapples are typically used.
  - Chirrinche, distillated guarapo. This is fermented for several days and then transferred to a container where it is heated until a distillation process is carried out and it becomes the liquor.
- Masato is prepared with rice, sugar, water, cinnamon, and whole clove (spice); it is strained, and the water is preserved and let aside to have a smooth fermentation.
- Refajo is a type of shandy beverage made by mixing Kola Hipinto (in the Santanderian region), Colombiana (in cities like Bogota), or Kola Roman (in the Caribbean region) with beer or rum. This mixture of soda and beer is very popular and seen a lot when it comes to accompanying foods that are higher in animal fat, generally at barbecues. The combination of the sweetness of the kola, the sourness of the beer, and the additional effect of the carbonated soda helps tolerate the fat in some of the typical dishes without hiding their original flavour.
- Sabajón is a sweet and creamy alcoholic drink from the Cordillera Oriental. It is made from eggs and milk with added flavours and juices of fruits and liqueur in half or less concentration.
- Viche (or biche) is a traditional home-brewed Afro-Caribbean alcoholic drink made from sugar cane popular on Colombia's Pacific Coast.
Colombian alcoholic beverages

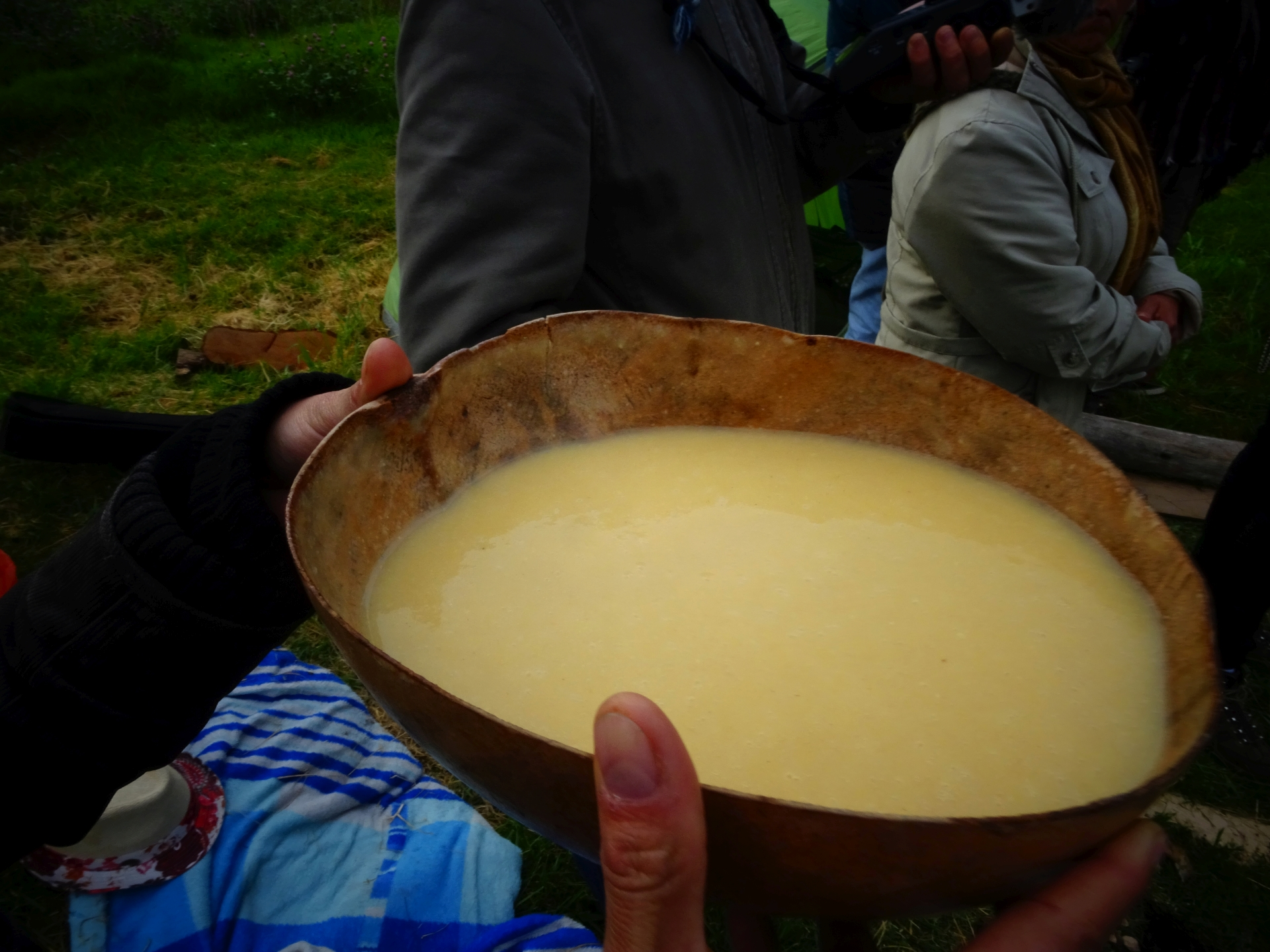
Chicha, Huán Festival - Temple of the Sun in Sogamoso

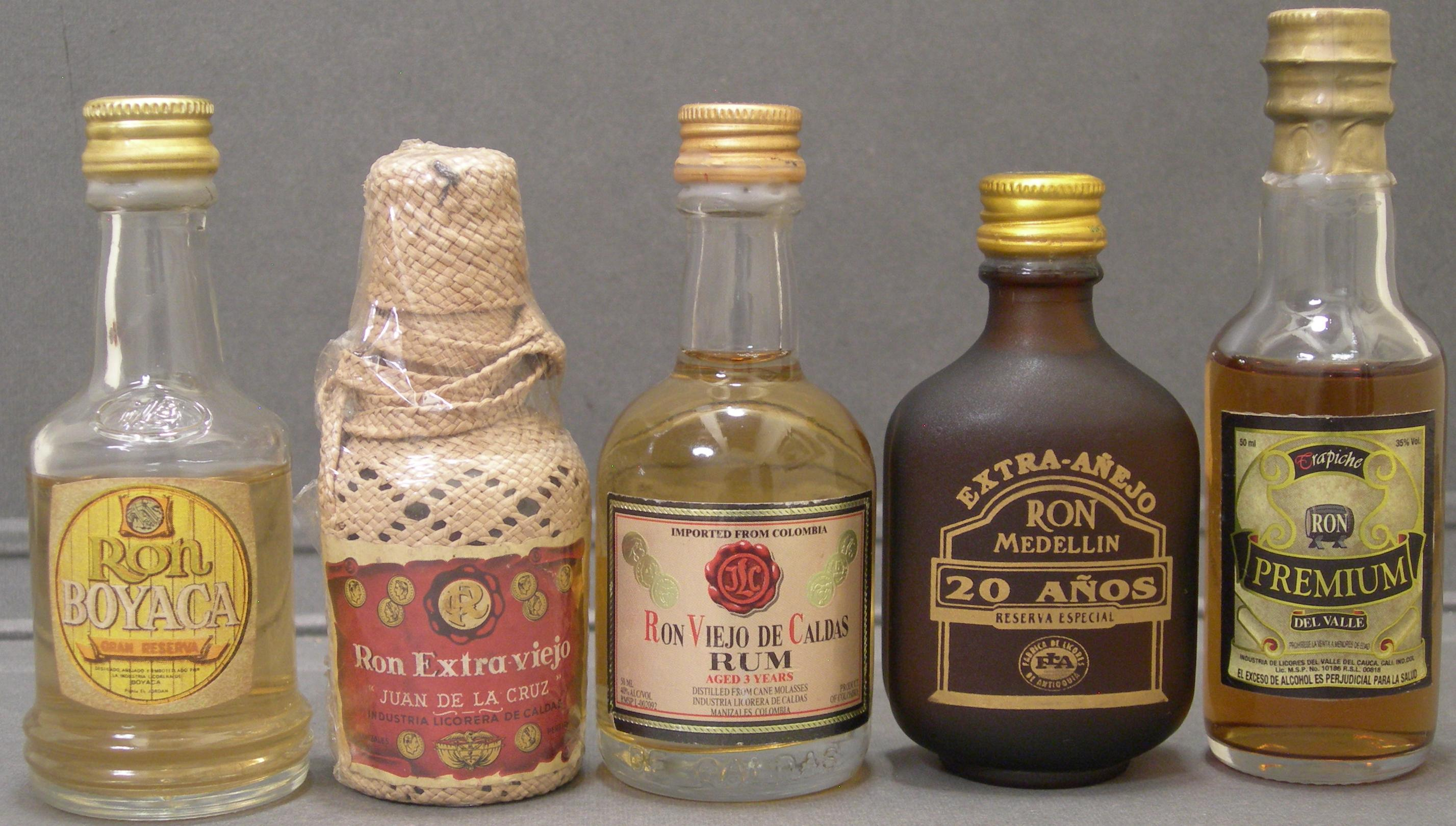
Rum (Ron)

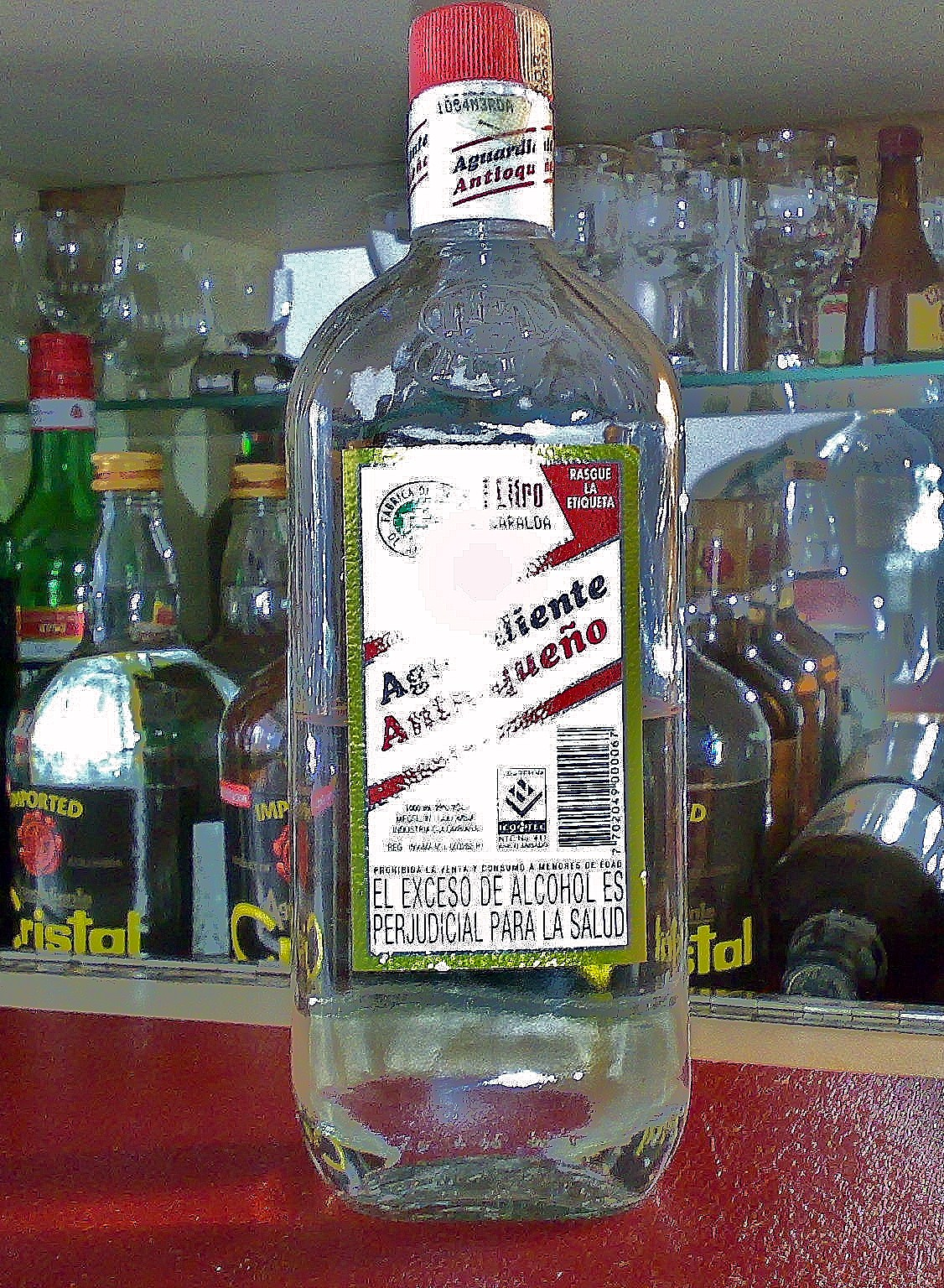
Aguardiente

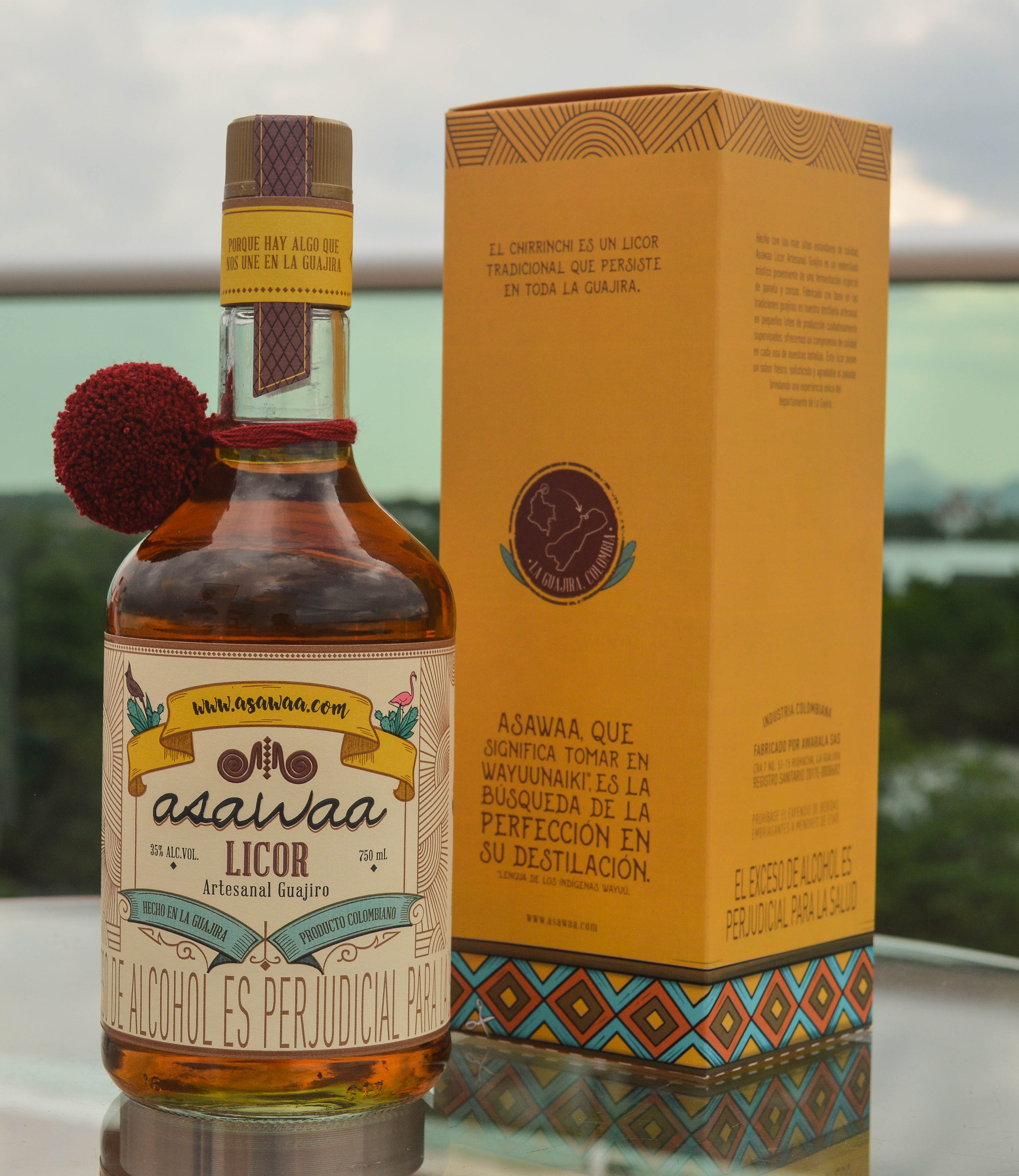
Guajiro liquor

== See also ==
- Muisca cuisine
- South American cuisine
