= Tarta de seso =

Beef brain pie in Colombian cuisine

Tarta de seso is a beef brain pie in Colombian cuisine. It is a type of food sometimes served at piqueteadero style rustic eateries. It can be made with spinach and grated cheese.
