= Arroz atollado =

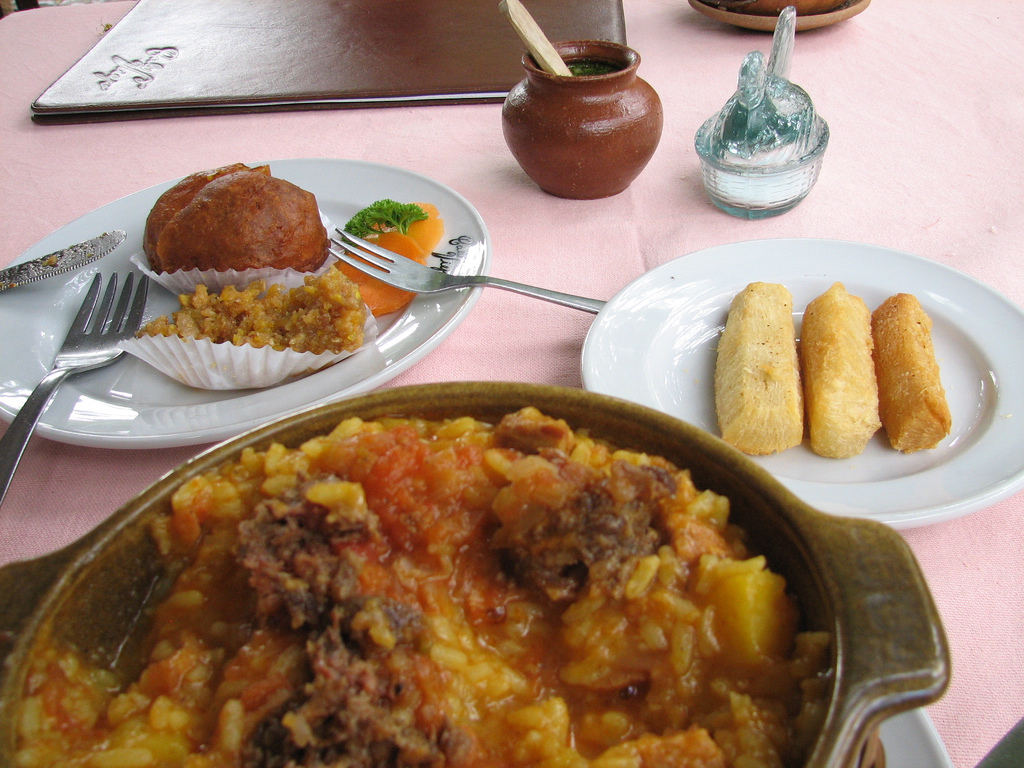
Arroz atollado

Arroz atollado is a Colombian dish from Cali, Colombia and the surrounding area. It is a typical dish of the Valle del Cauca department. It contains rice, chicken, pork, potatoes of various kinds, vegetables and seasonings. Arroz atollado may be served with fried plantain pancakes (patacón), hogao sauce and sausages. It is usually prepared on special occasions.
