= Chapil =

Alcoholic beverage from Ecuador and Columbia

Chapil is a traditional Colombian alcoholic beverage that originated in the area of Nariño. It is also produced in provinces adjacent to the Carchi border area between Colombia and Ecuador. The Awa people think that protects people from evil spirits.
