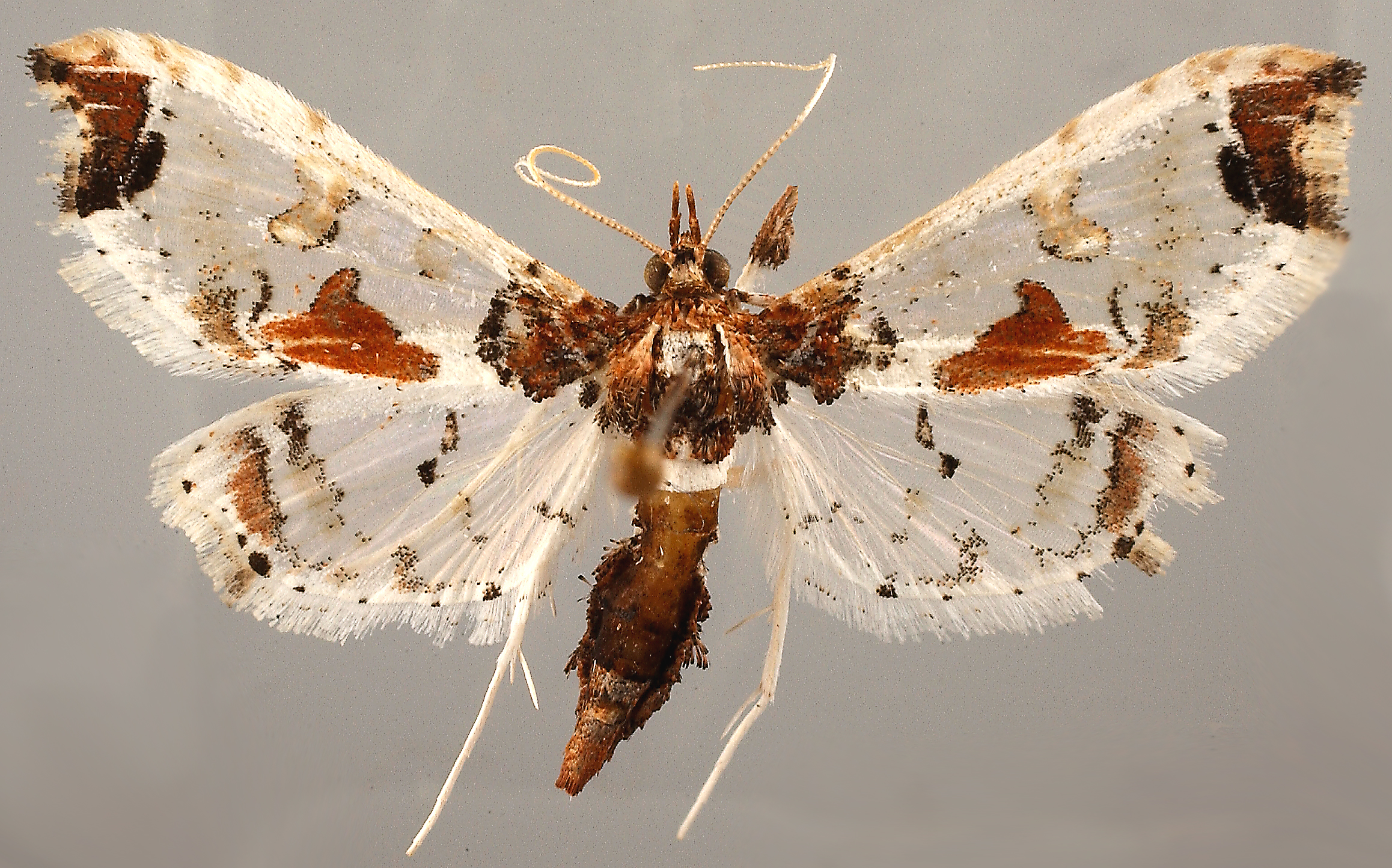

Scientific classification
- Kingdom: Animalia
- Phylum: Arthropoda
- Class: Insecta
- Order: Lepidoptera
- Family: Crambidae
- Genus: Neoleucinodes
- Species: N. elegantalis

Binomial name
- Neoleucinodes elegantalis (Guenée, 1854)

Synonyms
- Leucinodes elegantalis Guenée, 1854

= Neoleucinodes elegantalis =

Species of moth

Neoleucinodes elegantalis is a moth of the family Crambidae described by Achille Guenée in 1854. It ìs found in Mexico, Costa Rica, Cuba, Honduras, Grenada, Guatemala, Jamaica, Panama, Puerto Rico, Trinidad and Tobago, Argentina, Brazil, Colombia, Ecuador, Guyana, Paraguay, Peru, Suriname, Uruguay and Venezuela.

The larvae feed by burrowing into the fruit of Solanum species, including Solanum lycopersicum, Solanum melongena, Solanum aethiopicum, Solanum betaceum, Solanum quitoense, Solanum sessiliflorum, Solanum acerifolium, Solanum atropurpureum, Solanum crinitum, Solanum torvum, Solanum hirtum, Solanum lycocarpum, Solanum pseudolulo, Solanum viarum and Solanum sisymbriifolium, as well as Capsicum annuum. They feed on the flesh and seed of the fruit.
