= Solanum repandum =

Scientific classification
- Kingdom: Plantae
- Clade: Tracheophytes
- Clade: Angiosperms
- Clade: Eudicots
- Clade: Asterids
- Order: Solanales
- Family: Solanaceae
- Genus: Solanum
- Species: S. repandum

Binomial name
- Solanum repandum G.Forst.

Synonyms
- Solanum ferox var. repandum (G.Forst.) Bitter; Solanum latifolium Dunal; Solanum mariannense Hosok.; Solanum quitense Hook. & Arn.; Solanum seedii Horne ex Baker

Species of shrub

Solanum repandum is a species of evergreen shrub native to various island groups across the Pacific Ocean (Bismarck Archipelago, Cook Islands, Fiji, Mariana islands, Marquesas, Niue, Pitcairn Islands, Samoa, Society Islands, Vanuatu), and occasionally grown for its edible fruit.

Only partially domesticated and very rare in cultivation outside of its native range, it is also known as kokoua or huou. Solanum repandum will apparently hybridize with a number of close relatives, including the South American naranjilla, pseudolulo, and Solanum candidum, along with the Solanum lasiocarpum, from India. Solanum repandum is, in fact, so similar in growth habit and in its fruit that it has been possibly considered a subspecies of either Solanum quitoense (naranjilla) or Solanum lasiocarpum. The three species are native to different geographical areas, and tolerate slightly different climatic conditions, but their overall habit of growth is nearly identical, as is the use for the fruit in local cuisines. Each of them features a unique ring of emerald green juice surrounding the seeds in fruit that otherwise ripen to yellow or orange. The immature fruit is covered is bristles, which detach easily upon full ripening.

Like many of its relatives, S. repandum is a close relative of other nightshades cultivated for their edible fruit, including the tomato (S. lycopersicum), the naranjilla (S. quitoense) and the eggplant (S. melongena). It will readily hybridize with Solanum candidum, Solanum quitoense (naranjilla), Solanum lasiocarpum (Indian nightshade), and Solanum sessiliflorum (cocona), though in some cases those hybrids are sterile.

Scientifically, S. repandum is of additional scientific interest, as is S. candidum, as they appear to be the closest relatives and a possible link species between the Asian and South American members of the same botanical clade.

== Distribution and habitat ==
Solanum repandum is presumed to be native to a wide areas scattered around the archipelagos of the Pacific. Like the cocona, naranjilla, and Indian nightshade, S. candidium can bear fruit within 1 or 2 years from seed. A short-lived perennial, fruit production requires a rather long growing season, which limits its agricultural potential in more temperate climates, though hybridization and breeding might make this a species worthy of further investigation.

Like most edible nightshades, the S. repandum is attractive to pests like aphids, white flies, beetles, and spider mites, all of which can likewise destroy naranjillas and coconas quickly.
