= Champús =

Drink of South American origin

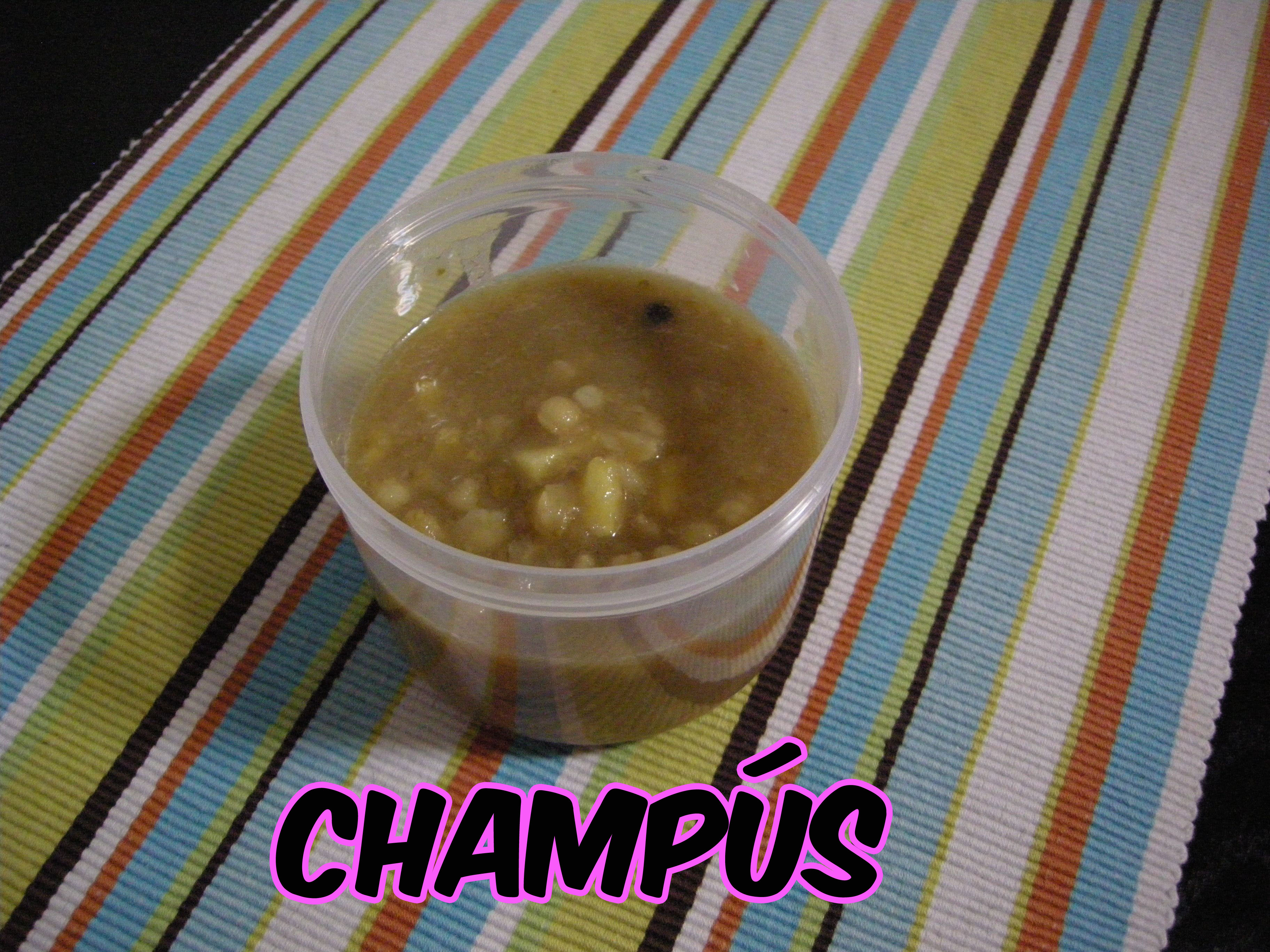
- Type: Beverage
- Origin: Colombia
- Flavor: sweet, sour, warm, and a bit bitter
- Ingredients: Maize, fruits such as lulo (also known as naranjilla), pineapple, quince or guanábana, sweetened with panela, and seasoned with cinnamon, cloves and orange tree leaves.

Champús is a popular drink in South America, particularly Ecuador, Peru and southwest Colombia. It is made with corn, fruits (such as lulo, also known as naranjilla), pineapple, quince or guanábana, sweetened with panela and seasoned with cinnamon, cloves and orange tree leaves. It is believed to have originated in southwestern Colombia.

In Peru, it is typically served warm, using apple, guanábana and quince instead of lulo. It is sold in the streets by a champusera, a typical figure of Lima's landscape, who passes down the recipe to younger generations.

In Ecuador, the drink is prepared with maize flour, panela and lemon tree leaves. It is common in funeral rites as many indigenous traditions consider the beverage a favorite of the dead.

In Colombia, crushed maize is used, in addition to panela, lulo, pineapple, cinnamon, cloves and orange tree leaves. In the regions of the south, such as the Departments of Nariño and Cauca, it is considered mainly a drink for Christmas. In Nariño it is also prepared with leaves of cedrón and congona. In the Department of Valle del Cauca it is served very cold, being popular at any time of the year.

In some regions of Peru and southern Colombia, the drink is made with mote, cooked maize that makes the champús thicker; in these regions, it is consumed as a dessert.

== Origin ==
The origin of the word champús remains unknown due to the lack of registered information, though there are several theories. In 1960, Daniel Guevara in "Expresión ritual de comidas y bebidas ecuatorianas" explains that champús in Ecuador is a drink used by indigenous tribes, similar to chicha and guarapo, in funeral rituals.

According to the "Diccionario of Vallecaucanismos" of Leonardo Tascón, champús is a Spanish word that means “something done wrong, a mixture of everything”. He explains that the Spanish gave this name to the drink due to the unpleasant mixture of many things.

Others consider it to be an African word. According to the Seminario de la Historia de la Cocina Peruana (2007), "A champucera is a lady that placed herself in the plots with a lamp of tallow candles and an Afro-Descendant boy recited a copla to proclaim the sale of the champús”. In "Canto Negro" (2004), Nicomedes Santa Cruz finds this lady in traditional Afro-Peruvian songs.

Diaz (2018) believes that the most convincing theory about the origin of the word comes from the Quechua, as “chapuy” means “to make dough”, which is the main ingredient of the drink.

Ceballos; Micanquer; Perez; Lasso and Zambrano (2011) explain that, in Colombia, the champús is a drink that comes from low-income families. They also explain that the champús gathers the energy of the corn, the sweetness of the sugar cane, the strength and the aroma of the cloves and the cinnamon as well as the secret touch from the orange leaves. Nowadays, it is a drink served all year long, but the authors explained that this drink is made for Christmas celebrations and is also considered a dessert. According to the authors, this type of drink cures both thirst and hunger.
