= Solanum vestissimum =

Scientific classification
- Kingdom: Plantae
- Clade: Tracheophytes
- Clade: Angiosperms
- Clade: Eudicots
- Clade: Asterids
- Order: Solanales
- Family: Solanaceae
- Genus: Solanum
- Species: S. vestissimum

Binomial name
- Solanum vestissimum Dunal

Species of flowering plant

Solanum vestissimum is a subtropical perennial plant from northwestern South America. Also known within its native range as toronjo, tumo, or coquina melón, S. vestissimum is a large semi-woody plant or shrub, up to 8 meters in height, though usually much smaller. The very large heart-shaped leaves are lined with spines along the top and bottom of the dorsal vein, similar to the naranjilla or pseudolulo. The leaves and stems of the plant are otherwise covered in short, felt-like hairs.

Native to temperate, cloud forest zones of Colombia and Venezuela, the toronjo bears edible fruit, but is rarely cultivated. Instead, the plant proliferates as a weedy species at medium-altitude locations in its native countries. Like the naranjilla, the toronjo prefers shaded or semi-shaded growing environments.

The fruit is a large berry, green when unripe, ripening to yellow or yellow-orange, about the size of a small tomato or a large tomatillo. The orange flesh is filled with an abundance of small seeds. The strong, sweet-tart flavor is regarded as excellent, and worthy of further agricultural investigation, but the fruit is also covered with sharp bristles which persist upon full ripening, and which can be irritating to the skin Unharvested fruit will often swell and burst, releasing seeds. Some botanists consider the toronjo to be worthy of investigation as an agricultural fruit plant, though a significant amount of breeding and selection for less bristly fruits would be needed.

== Classification ==
Within the genus Solanum, S. vestissimum is a part of the leptostemonum clade. Within this clade, S. vestissimum belongs to the Lasiocarpa clade. Other species within this clade include: S. candidum, S. hyporhodium, S. lasiocarpum, S. felinum, S. quitoense, S. repandum and S. pseudolulo. Specimens of each of these plants are often spiny, covered in short hairs, and share a similar leaf shape; many of them bear edible fruit, and hybrids between many of these species are possible. In both fruit quality and plant appearance, there is considerable diversity within each of these species.
