= Lulada =

Traditional Colombian beverage

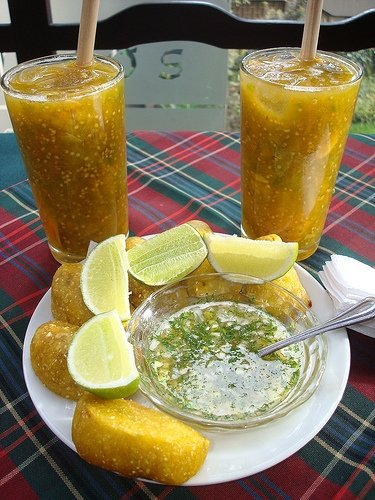
- Luladas served with empanadas.
- Type: Beverage
- Country of origin: Colombian
- Ingredients: Lulo, lime juice, water, and sugar

Lulada is a traditional Colombian beverage from Cali, in the Valle del Cauca Department of Colombia. It is prepared from lulo, a fruit common to the region, lime juice, water, and sugar for sweetness. It often has the texture and consistency of a smoothie and is sometimes served with a shot of aguardiente. A lulada differs from the standard lulo juice in that the lulo fruit is not blended during the drink's preparation; instead, the fruit pulp is chopped by hand and beaten with a grinder.

Common variations may include the addition of condensed milk or alcohol.

== See also ==
- Aguapanela
