= Paparajotes =

Fried dough dessert in Spanish cuisine

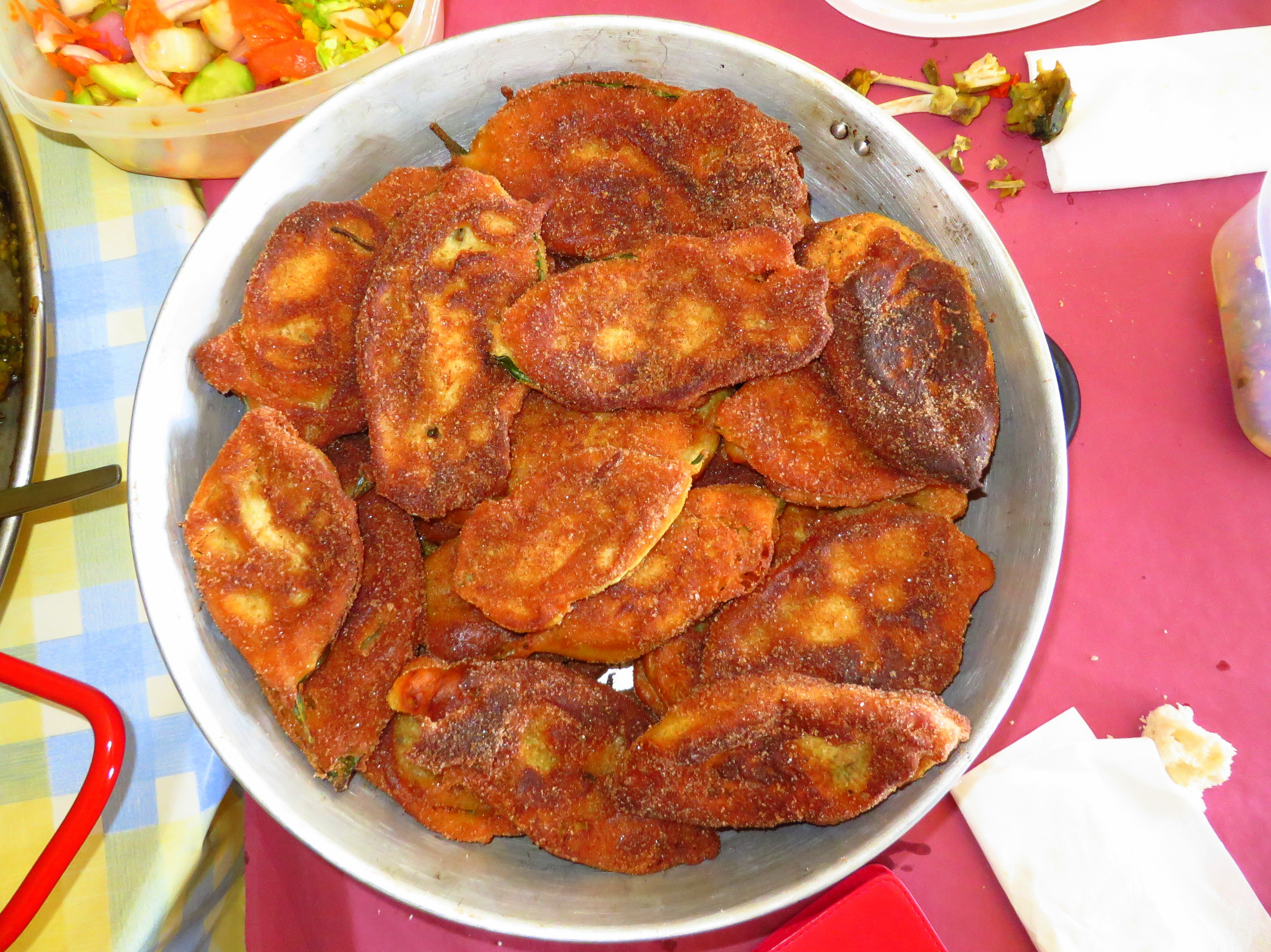

Paparajotes are a typical dessert of Murcia, Spain made with lemon leaves coated with a dough made with flour and egg that are fried and sprinkled with powdered sugar and cinnamon.

== History ==
Paparajotes were introduced by way of the Middle East to Murcia and were made in peasant homes. In Murcia they were made daily, cooked using firewood, and eaten after each meal often accompanying by puchero coffee or café de olla. Main ingredients are: flour, egg, milk, and lemon leaves. Even today the origin of the name remains a mystery.

== Preparation ==
To make paparajotes, lemon leaves are collected from local orchards. The leaves should be light green (young), and neither too soft or too hard. Once a leaf is chosen, it is coated with dough and fried. Yeast is used in the dough to cause the dough to rise and coat the leaf.

== Consumption ==
Today, it is the typical dish of the spring festivities in Murcia (Bando de la Huerta) together with the fritters, dessert that is traditionally eaten on the day of San José and Matasuegras, some fried biscuits stuffed with pastry cream or chocolate. The leaf is not supposed to be eaten; the eater is expected to scrape the fried batter off the leaf with their teeth. The leaf is used only to give form and a slight citrus flavor to the batter.

=== Stalls ===
Both in the spring festivities and during the Feria de Septiembra de Murcia, many Murcians put up stalls, which provide food to festival attendees. These stalls are located in places assigned by the relevant town hall, and it is there that people can enjoy the paparajotes, one of the symbols and hallmark of the Region of Murcia.

== Paparajotes totaneros ==
Totana paparajotes are not sweet, but salty. They are a mixture of mashed chickpeas (previously cooked with cod), eggs, cod, garlic and parsley. This mixture is then collected with a spoon and fried at the same time in a frying pan with the oil very hot. It is customary to cook them at Easter and add them to a stew made of chickpeas and potatoes.
