= Neoleucinodes torvis =

Scientific classification
- Kingdom: Animalia
- Phylum: Arthropoda
- Class: Insecta
- Order: Lepidoptera
- Family: Crambidae
- Genus: Neoleucinodes
- Species: N. torvis

Binomial name
- Neoleucinodes torvis Capps, 1948

Synonyms
- Leucinodes pusilla Amsel, 1956

Species of moth

Neoleucinodes torvis is a moth in the family Crambidae. It was described by Hahn William Capps in 1948. It is found in Cuba, Puerto Rico, Jamaica, Grenada, Dominica, the Virgin Islands, St. Croix, Mexico, Guatemala, Panama, Peru, Brazil (Minas Gerais), Guyana, Suriname and French Guiana.

The wingspan is 11–15 mm for males and 12–18 mm for females. The wings are dirty white.

The larvae feed on Solanum torvum.
