= Neoleucinodes alegralis =

Scientific classification
- Kingdom: Animalia
- Phylum: Arthropoda
- Class: Insecta
- Order: Lepidoptera
- Family: Crambidae
- Genus: Neoleucinodes
- Species: N. alegralis

Binomial name
- Neoleucinodes alegralis (Schaus, 1920)

Synonyms
- Lipocosma alegralis Schaus, 1920

Species of moth

Neoleucinodes alegralis is a moth in the family Crambidae. It was described by Schaus in 1920. It is found in French Guiana, Panama, Guatemala and Costa Rica.
