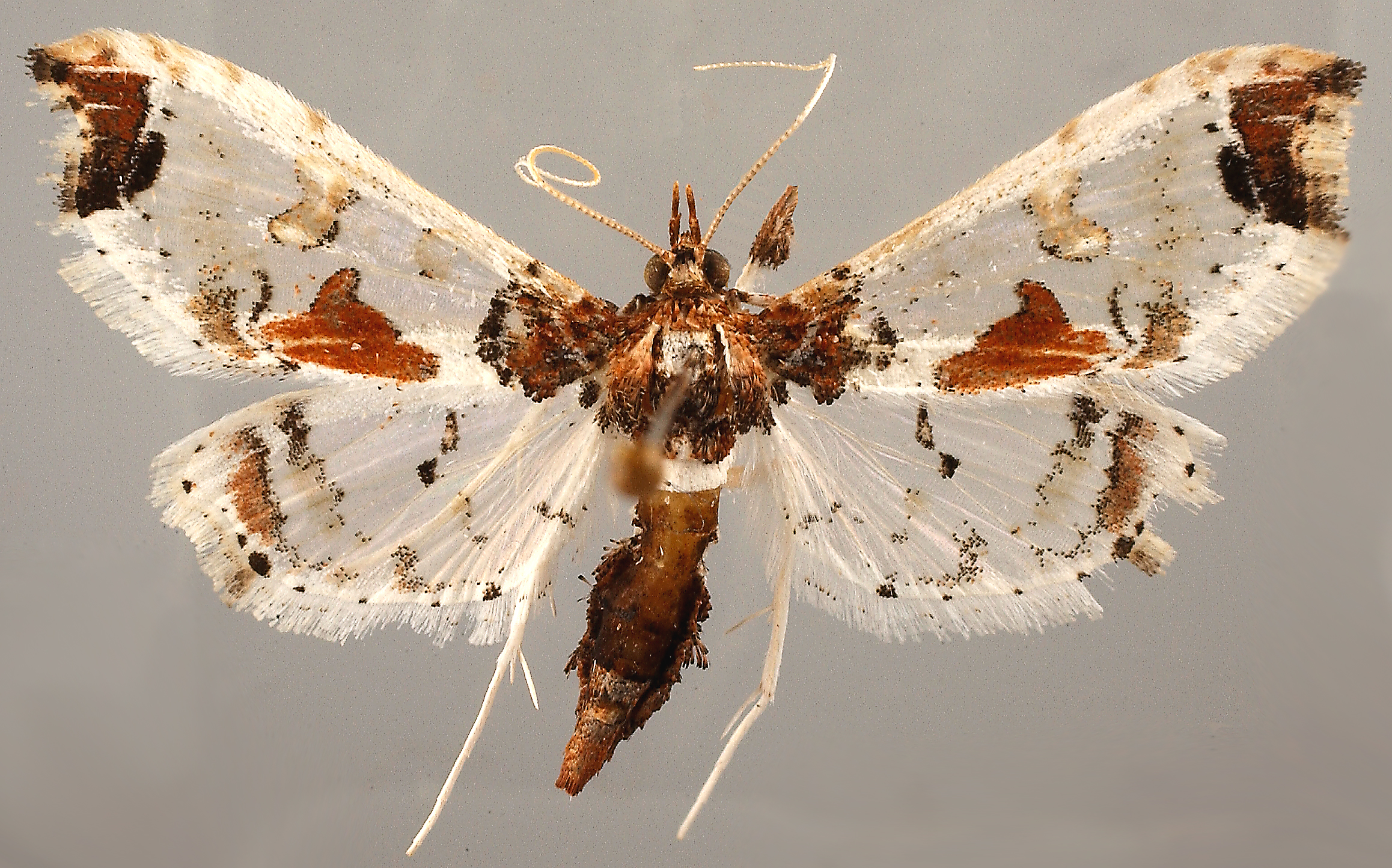
- Neoleucinodes elegantalis

Scientific classification
- Kingdom: Animalia
- Phylum: Arthropoda
- Clade: Pancrustacea
- Class: Insecta
- Order: Lepidoptera
- Family: Crambidae
- Tribe: Lineodini
- Genus: Neoleucinodes; Capps, 1948

= Neoleucinodes =

Genus of moths

Neoleucinodes is a genus of snout moths of the subfamily Spilomelinae in the family Crambidae. The genus was described by Hahn William Capps in 1948 as a Neotropical split-off of the Old World genus Leucinodes.

== Species ==
- Neoleucinodes alegralis (Schaus, 1920)
- Neoleucinodes dissolvens (Dyar, 1914)
- Neoleucinodes elegantalis (Guenée, 1854)
- Neoleucinodes galapagensis Landry, 2016
- Neoleucinodes imperialis (Guenée, 1854)
- Neoleucinodes incultalis (Schaus, 1912)
- Neoleucinodes prophetica (Dyar, 1914)
- Neoleucinodes silvaniae Diaz & Solis, 2007
- Neoleucinodes torvis Capps, 1948
