= Neoleucinodes dissolvens =

Scientific classification
- Kingdom: Animalia
- Phylum: Arthropoda
- Class: Insecta
- Order: Lepidoptera
- Family: Crambidae
- Genus: Neoleucinodes
- Species: N. dissolvens

Binomial name
- Neoleucinodes dissolvens (Dyar, 1914)

Synonyms
- Leucinodes dissolvens Dyar, 1914

Species of moth

Neoleucinodes dissolvens is a moth in the family Crambidae. It was described by Harrison Gray Dyar Jr. in 1914. It is found in French Guiana, Ecuador, Suriname and Brazil (São Paulo de Olivença, Amazonas).
