= Papelón con limón =

Venezuelan beverage

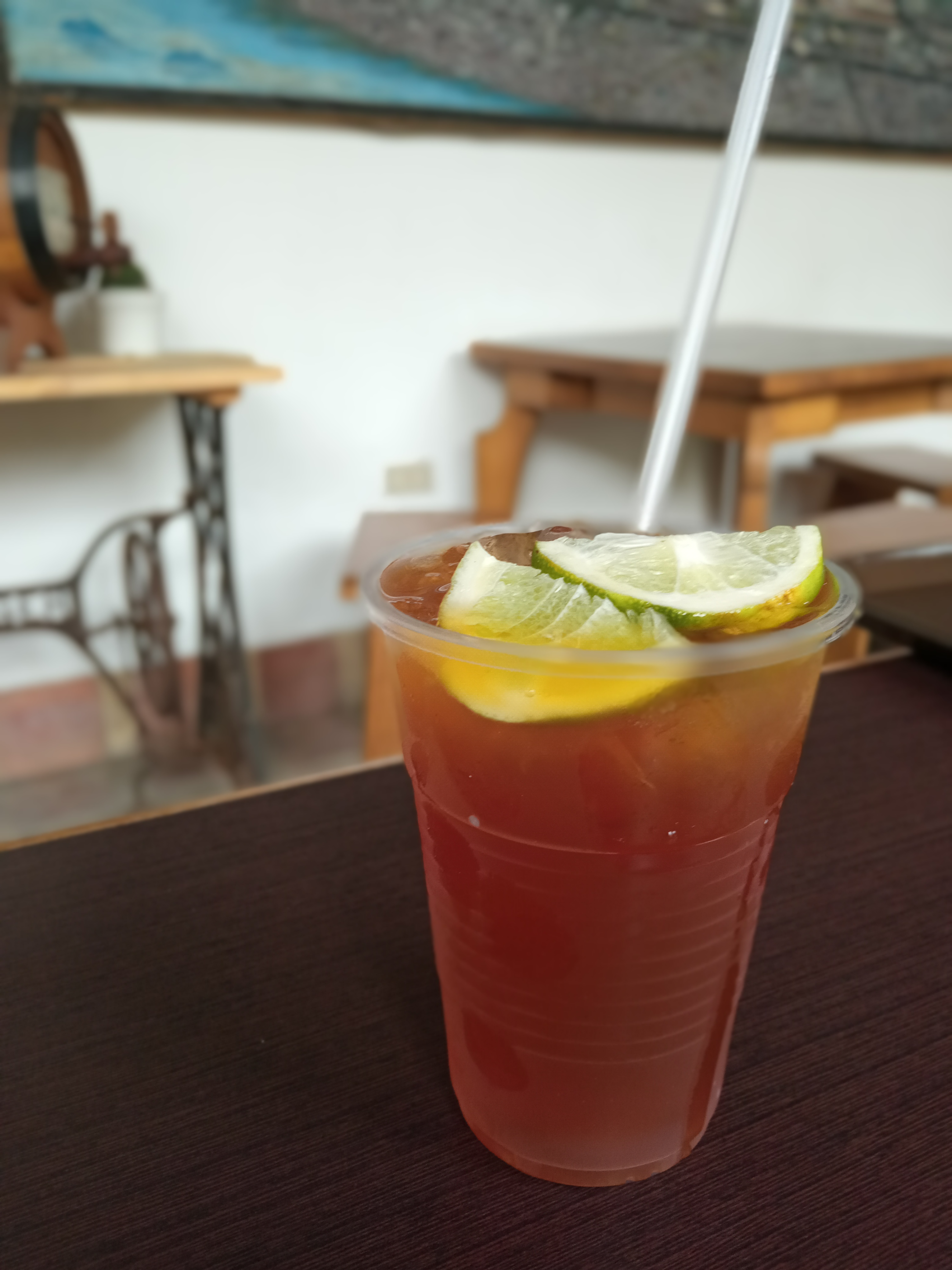
Papelón con limón

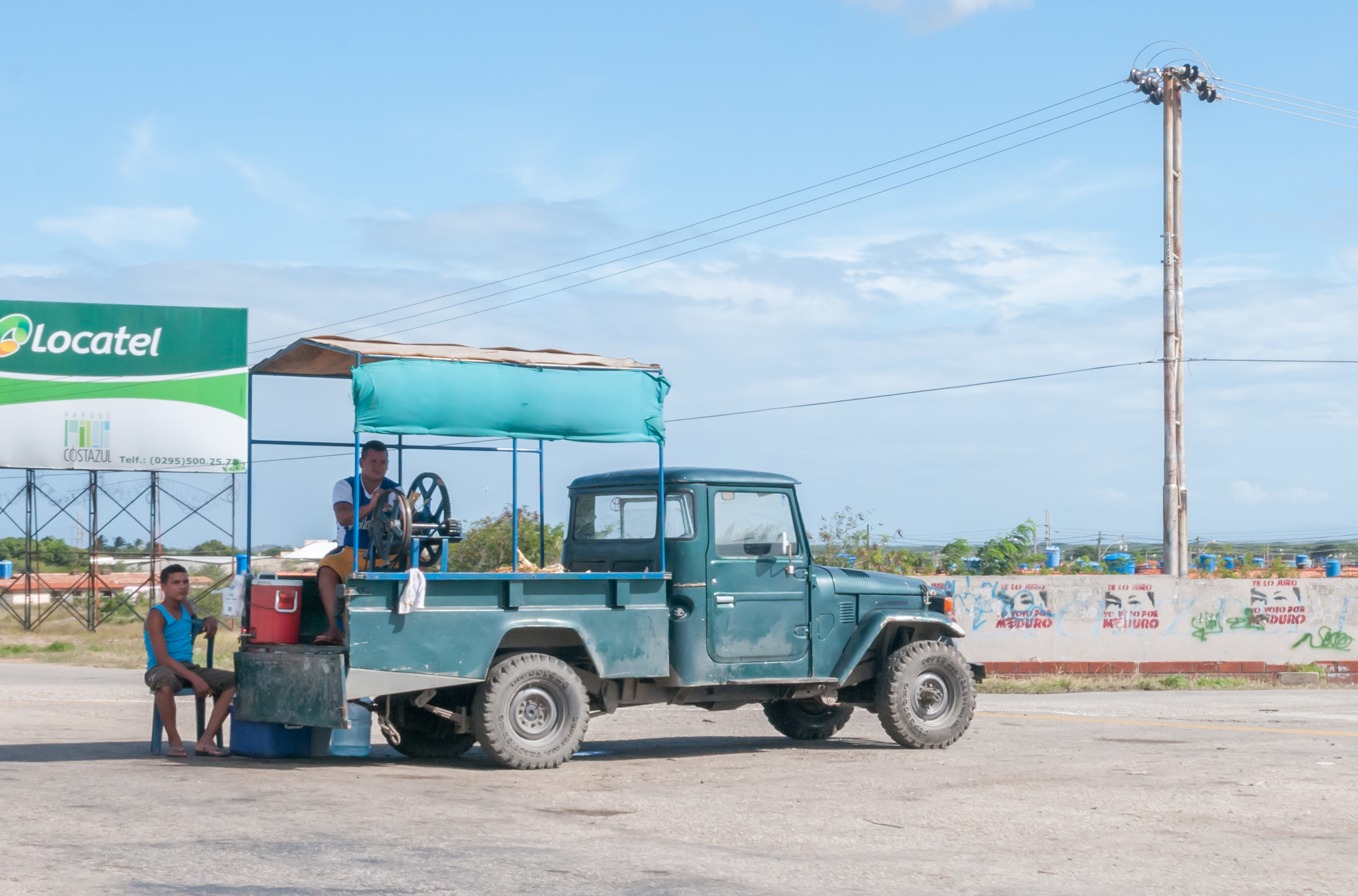
Selling papelón con limón in Margarita Island, Venezuela

Papelón con limón (Regional Spanish for: Panela with lemon) is a Venezuelan beverage made with rapadura (raw hardened sugar cane juice), water and lemon or lime juice.

It is usually served during the hottest hours of the day, and commonly offered with traditional Venezuelan food, such as arepas, cachapas or hervidos (rich chicken or beef stew).

== See also ==
- Aguapanela, a similar drink from Colombia
- List of lemonade topics
