= Neoleucinodes prophetica =

Scientific classification
- Kingdom: Animalia
- Phylum: Arthropoda
- Class: Insecta
- Order: Lepidoptera
- Family: Crambidae
- Genus: Neoleucinodes
- Species: N. prophetica

Binomial name
- Neoleucinodes prophetica (Dyar, 1914)

Synonyms
- Leucinodes elegantalis var. prophetica Dyar, 1914; Leucinodes minimalis Amsel, 1956

Species of moth

Neoleucinodes prophetica, the potato tree borer, is a moth in the family Crambidae. It was described by Harrison Gray Dyar Jr. in 1914. It is found in Puerto Rico, Cuba, Jamaica, the Dominican Republic, Guatemala, Costa Rica, Panama, Honduras, Peru, Venezuela, Colombia, Trinidad and Tobago and Brazil (Rio de Janeiro). It is also present in southern Florida.

The length of the forewings is 8.5-10.5 mm.

The larvae feed on Solanum umbellatum and Solanum erianthum. They bore in the fruit of their host plant.
