= Neoleucinodes silvaniae =

Scientific classification
- Kingdom: Animalia
- Phylum: Arthropoda
- Clade: Pancrustacea
- Class: Insecta
- Order: Lepidoptera
- Family: Crambidae
- Genus: Neoleucinodes
- Species: N. silvaniae

Binomial name
- Neoleucinodes silvaniae Diaz & Solis, 2007

Species of moth

Neoleucinodes silvaniae is a moth in the family Crambidae. It was described by Ana Elizabeth Diaz and Maria Alma Solis in 2007. It is found in Colombia.

The larvae feed on the fruit of Solanum lanceifolium.
