= Aguapanela =

South American traditional drink

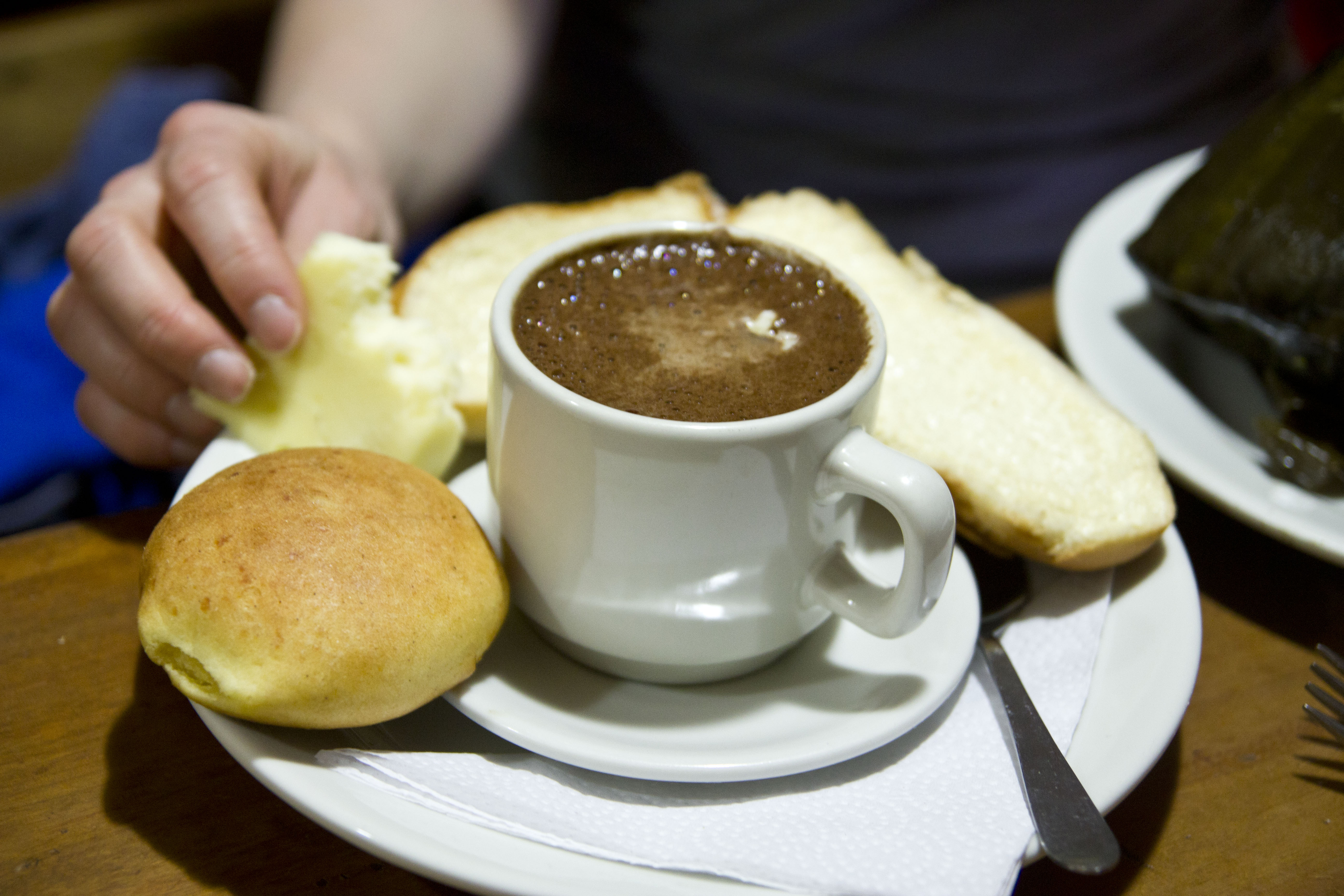
- A cup of aguapanela with pandebono
- Type: Traditional drink
- Origin: Colombia
- Color: Brown or chestnut
- Flavor: Sweet and citrusy
- Ingredients: Panela

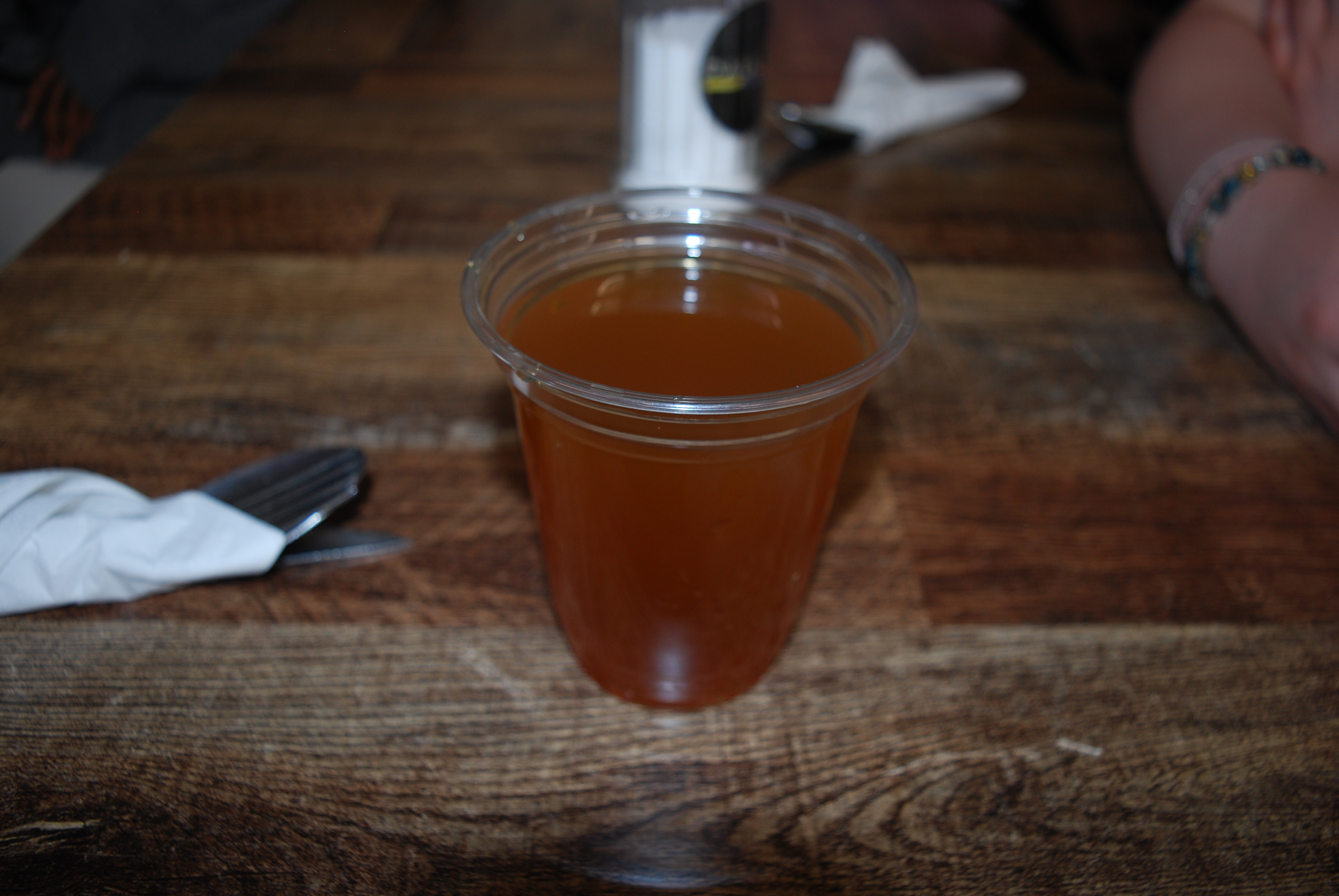
Aguapanela with lemon juice in a plastic cup

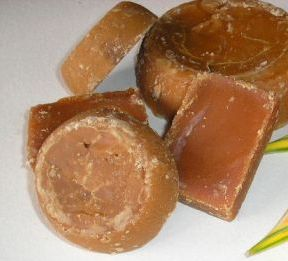
Usually a half block of a panela is added to water and boiled until it dissolves.

Aguapanela, agua de panela or agüepanela is a drink commonly found throughout all Colombia, especially in the Andes region. Its literal translation means 'panela water', as it is an infusion made from panela, which is derived from hardened sugar cane juice.

Though recipe variations exist throughout South America, it is best known in Colombia. In Colombia, it is commonly drunk with a hint of lemon, much the way tea is consumed.

== Preparation ==
Aguapanela is made by adding pieces of panela to water and stirring until the pieces are entirely dissolved. The drink may be served hot or cold, with lemon or lime often being added. In the hot form, sometimes milk or a chunk of cheese is added in place of fruit juice.

In Colombia, black coffee is often prepared with aguapanela instead of water and sugar.

In Costa Rica, panela, locally known as tapa de dulce, is combined with hot water or milk to make agua dulce ("sweet water"), a common breakfast drink.

== Uses ==
Many claims have been made about the beneficial effects of aguapanela, based on assumptions such as having more vitamin C than orange juice or as many rehydrating minerals as Gatorade. It is also popularly considered a helpful drink for the treatment of colds. However, much like soft drinks, it is almost exclusively sugar water.

Today, aguapanela has gone from being a blue-collar drink to one that can be found in upscale café boutiques in Colombia as a tea.

Canelazo is an alcoholic version of aguapanela with cinnamon and aguardiente added to it. Sugar is rubbed on the edges of the glass when served.

== See also ==
- Papelón con limón, a similar drink from Venezuela
- Sugarcane juice, for when the input into panela is served without processing
  - Guarapo (drink), an alcoholic variant of that
