= Vascular wilt in lulo =

Fusarium oxysporum f.sp. quitoense

Scientific classification
- Domain: Eukaryota
- Kingdom: Fungi
- Division: Ascomycota
- Class: Sordariomycetes
- Order: Hypocreales
- Family: Nectriaceae
- Genus: Fusarium
- Species: F. oxysporum
- Forma specialis: F. o. f.sp. quitoense

Trionomial name
- Fusarium oxysporum f.sp. quitoense

Plant fungal disease

Vascular wilt in the perennial shrub lulo or naranjilla (Solanum quitoense) is a disease caused by the fungus Fusarium oxysporum f. sp. quitoense.

== Host ==
Lulo or naranjilla (Solanum quitoense) is a perennial shrub whose fruit is an important input for production of fresh juice in Colombia, Ecuador, and other Latin American countries. Lulo is highly profitable for small-scale farmers and its production reached more than 3800 ha in Colombia in 2013 and 5000 ha in Ecuador in 2010. This crop has been considered as very promising for export markets since the 1970s but problems of low productivity and susceptibility to many diseases have limited its potential.

== Symptoms ==
Diseased plants are easily distinguishable due to their flaccid and chlorotic appearance. Flaccidity and chlorosis start in the lower regions of the plant and progressively move upwards causing wilt of the entire plant. In later stages of disease development, progressive defoliation occurs, which is followed by necrosis in leaves. Discoloration of the vascular system is a characteristic symptom. Vascular discoloration, ring shaped brown coloration of the phloem, is visible as the vascular system becomes exposed following leaf and flower abscission in defoliation. Vascular discoloration is clearly observed when longitudinal or transverse cuts are made on the main roots, stems, leaf petioles, fruit peduncles, and fruits.

== Impact ==
Vascular wilt has a huge impact on crop yield. Some regions in Ecuador can reach up to 80% in yield losses for Lulo production due to vascular wilt. This reduced yield is very problematic since many small communities depends economically mostly on this crop and resources for diseases management at these areas are not available,. But this disease not only has an economic impact, environmental problems also are derived from this problematic in the form of deforestation.

Deforestation is often associated with Lulo cultivation because farmers generally abandoned the land once the disease shows and move to other areas that are pathogen free which are often natural forest areas. The lack of knowledge that this disease can be seed transmitted and combining it with the fact that moving to free-pathogen areas is a common practice to avoid disease leads to more deforestation. In Ecuador this deforestation is a major concern because the Amazon region, where most Lulo is produced, is considered a biodiversity “hotspot”.

Data collected in several commercial farms located at the Pastaza Province, Amazon region of Ecuador, determine that the incidence of this disease in a period between October 2017 and January 2018 was around of 17%, observing that the variety naranjilla común was the most susceptible. This problematic increases as time goes on due to the poor availability of information for farmers regarding management practices.

== Environment ==
There are many factors that play an important role for the spread a Fusarium species in the fields. In the case of vascular wilt in Lulo there is two major factors that make this disease an epidemic problem in Ecuador and Colombia. Primarily this pathogen benefits from the combination of the cultural practices and from the fact that it is seed transmitted for spread itself. In Ecuador, Lulo seed is produced informally, farmers get their seeds from selected ripe fruits, and plants are produced in improvised seed beds near naranjilla plots. Since it is a seed-borne pathogen and because there is no initiative to produce a pathogen-free seed then is very easy to spread the disease and cause epidemics. Also, this pathogen as a species is a soil-borne pathogen which means that it can persist in the soil for many years. Another factor that benefits the presence vascular wilt in Lulo is the presence of the nematode Meloidogyne incognita which increases the plant's susceptibility to infection from F. oxysporum f. sp. quitoense probably due to lesions on the root surface.

== Management ==
Primarily, the lack of management strategies is the main reason that this disease cause epidemics in Latin America. In Ecuador, the IPM CRSP began the development of management strategies for the control of this disease. The project pursued two management strategies: (1) use of pathogen-free seeds; and (2) development of naranjilla varieties with genetic resistance. The production of certified disease-free seed is not practical in naranjilla growing areas where producers are wide spread and access by seed suppliers is limited. Chemical control took place for disease control. Laboratory testing with chemical alternatives determined that the use of carbendazim in 2g/L of water provides a good control of the pathogen in the seed and was the most cost effective. An Instituto Nacional de Investigaciones Agropecuarias de Ecuador (INIAP) bulletin and other outreach materials were developed to help the information to be spread to the farmers. For the production of resistant varieties of Lulo, several accessions of the Lasiocarpa section genus Solanum were found to be resistant to F. oxysporum f. sp. quitoense. The development of the resistant varieties focused on the use of plant grafting. An experiment found that grafting common Lulo cultivar “nanegalito” with the accession ECU-6242 of Solanum hirtum provided the best result for getting better yields. One interesting fact is that ECU-6242 is resistant to the root knot nematode (Meloidogyne incognita) which also helps the disease to develop. In Nariño Department, Colombia, researchers have also found that grafting S. hirtum with S. quitoense is a good way to improve the plants resistance to infections of F. oxysporum without losing fruit quality.
