= Neoleucinodes imperialis =

Scientific classification
- Kingdom: Animalia
- Phylum: Arthropoda
- Clade: Pancrustacea
- Class: Insecta
- Order: Lepidoptera
- Family: Crambidae
- Genus: Neoleucinodes
- Species: N. imperialis

Binomial name
- Neoleucinodes imperialis (Guenée, 1854)

Synonyms
- Leucinodes imperialis Guenée, 1854; Leucinodes discerptalis Walker, 1866

Species of moth

Neoleucinodes imperialis is a moth in the family Crambidae. It was described by Achille Guenée in 1854. It is found in Haiti, Honduras, Costa Rica, Panama and the Brazilian states of Paraná, Minas Gerais and Rio de Janeiro.
