= Neoleucinodes incultalis =

Scientific classification
- Kingdom: Animalia
- Phylum: Arthropoda
- Class: Insecta
- Order: Lepidoptera
- Family: Crambidae
- Genus: Neoleucinodes
- Species: N. incultalis

Binomial name
- Neoleucinodes incultalis (Schaus, 1912)

Synonyms
- Parthenodes incultalis Schaus, 1912

Species of moth

Neoleucinodes incultalis is a moth in the family Crambidae. It was described by Schaus in 1912. It is found in Costa Rica.
