= Café de olla =

Mexican coffee drink

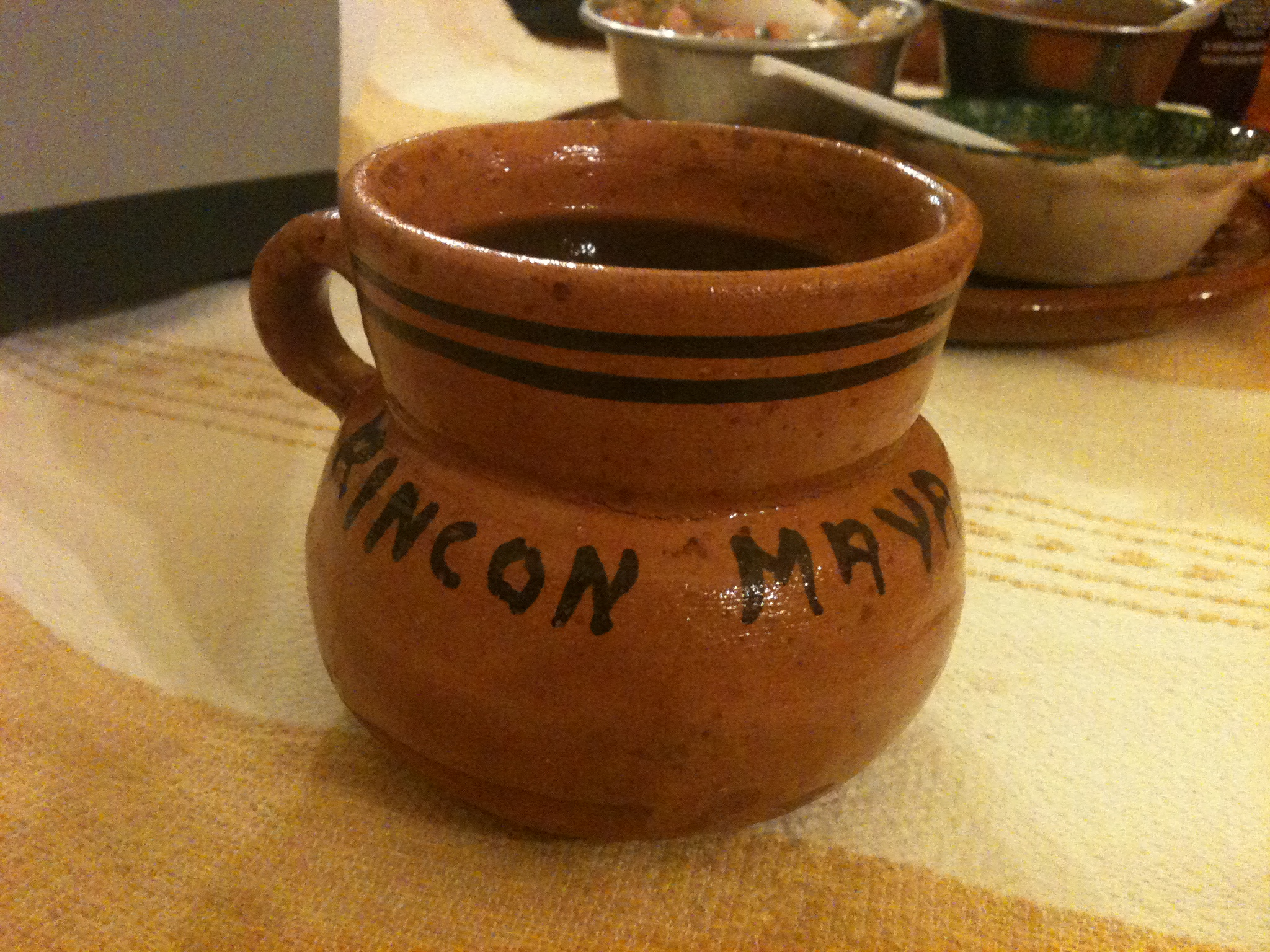
- Traditional clay cup to serve café de olla.
- Origin: Mexico
- Ingredients: Water, panela, cinnamon, ground coffee

Café de olla (lit. 'pot coffee') is a traditional Mexican coffee beverage. To prepare café de olla, it is essential to use a traditional earthen clay pot, as this gives a special flavor to the coffee. This type of coffee is principally consumed in cold climates and in rural areas.

In Mexico, a basic café de olla is made with ground coffee, cinnamon and piloncillo. Optional ingredients include orange peel, anise and cloves.

== See also ==
- List of hot beverages
- Mexican cuisine
