= Guarapo (drink) =

Sugar cane-based beverage

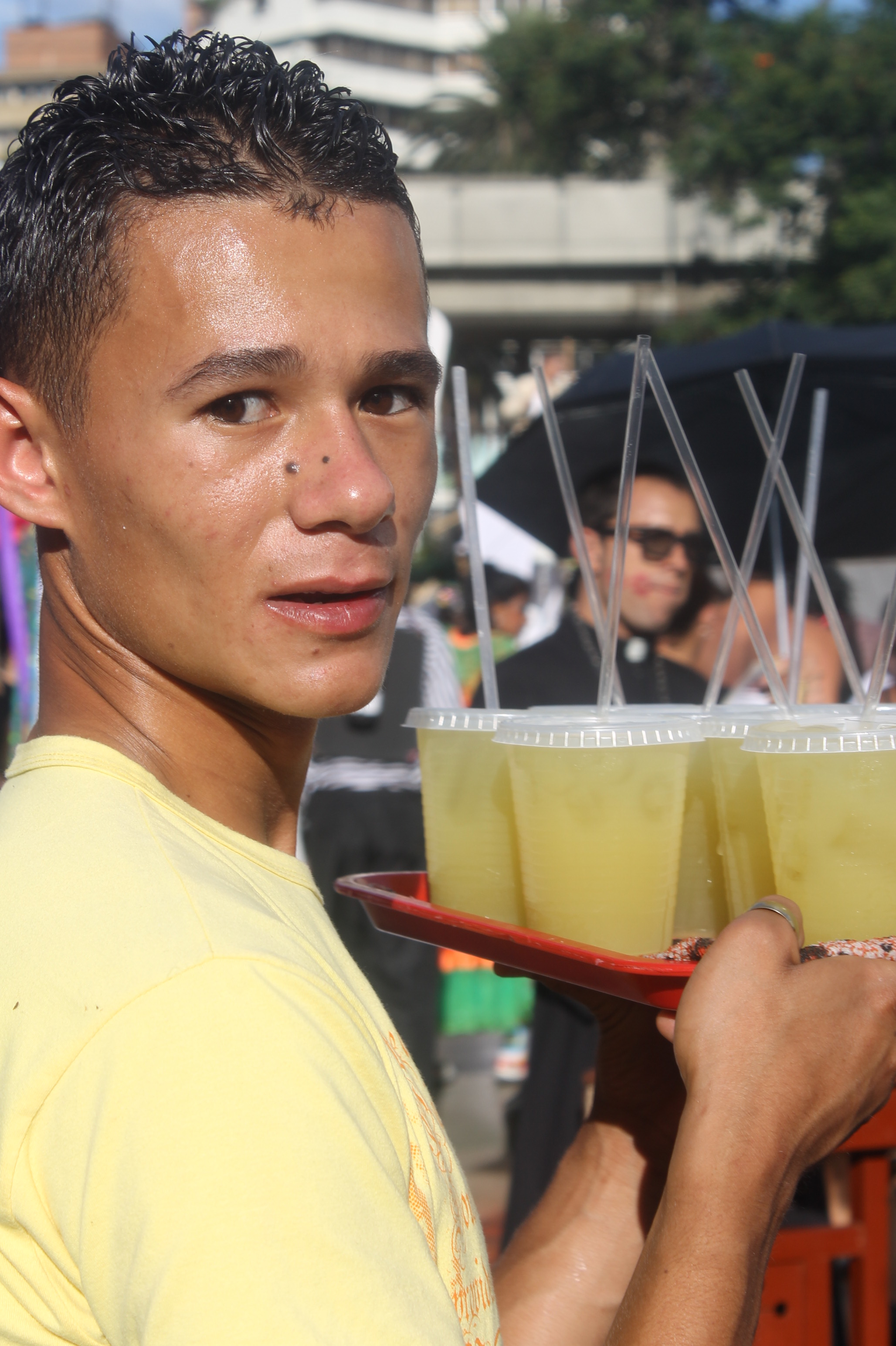
- A vender sells guarapo in Colombia.
- Type: Fermented beverage
- Region or state: Latin America
- Main ingredients: Sugarcane juice

Guarapo (from the Quechua warapu) is a Latin American fermented alcoholic drink derived from sugarcane juice.

"Guarapo" is also a Spanish word for sugarcane juice itself, but in much of Latin America it is used to refer specifically to the fermented product. The Quechua word warapu signifies the juice of crushed cane.

== Variations ==
=== Mexico ===
In the Mexican state of Tabasco, during the Spanish colonial period in the 16th century, when sugarcane was introduced from the Caribbean, the Chontal Maya people began to produce the drink by fermenting sugarcane juice. It became very popular among the Indigenous population, who consume it primarily at parties and celebrations, including Day of the Dead. They also produce guarapo de maíz, or corn guarapo, which is made by fermenting toasted corn, panela, and water.

=== Cuba ===
In Cuba, the drink is prepared in rural communities by dissolving honey or panela in water and fermenting it with a type of yeast commonly referred to as cunchos or supias. This yeast is often shared among those who produce the beverage. It is also common to produce the beverage by crushing sugarcane in a trapiche or mill, either drinking it fresh or fermenting it. This is also how the typical Cuban drink aguardiente is produced.

=== Central and South America ===
Guarapo is particularly well known in the Latin American nations of Panama, Puerto Rico, the Dominican Republic, Ecuador, Venezuela, Colombia, Bolivia, and Peru. Venezuelans also refer to coffee mixed with a large amount of water as guarapo. Colombians generally drink guarapo, fermented with yeast known as cunchos in clay vessels. The Festival of Guarapo is held in the Colombian town of Tuluá.

=== Brazil ===
In Brazil, sugarcane juice, known locally as garapa, or caldo de cana, is commonly sold by street vendors in Brazil. Machines are used to press the sugarcane and the juice is extracted. It is sometimes served with lemon or pineapple juice. In contrast with other Latin American countries, it is not fermented.
