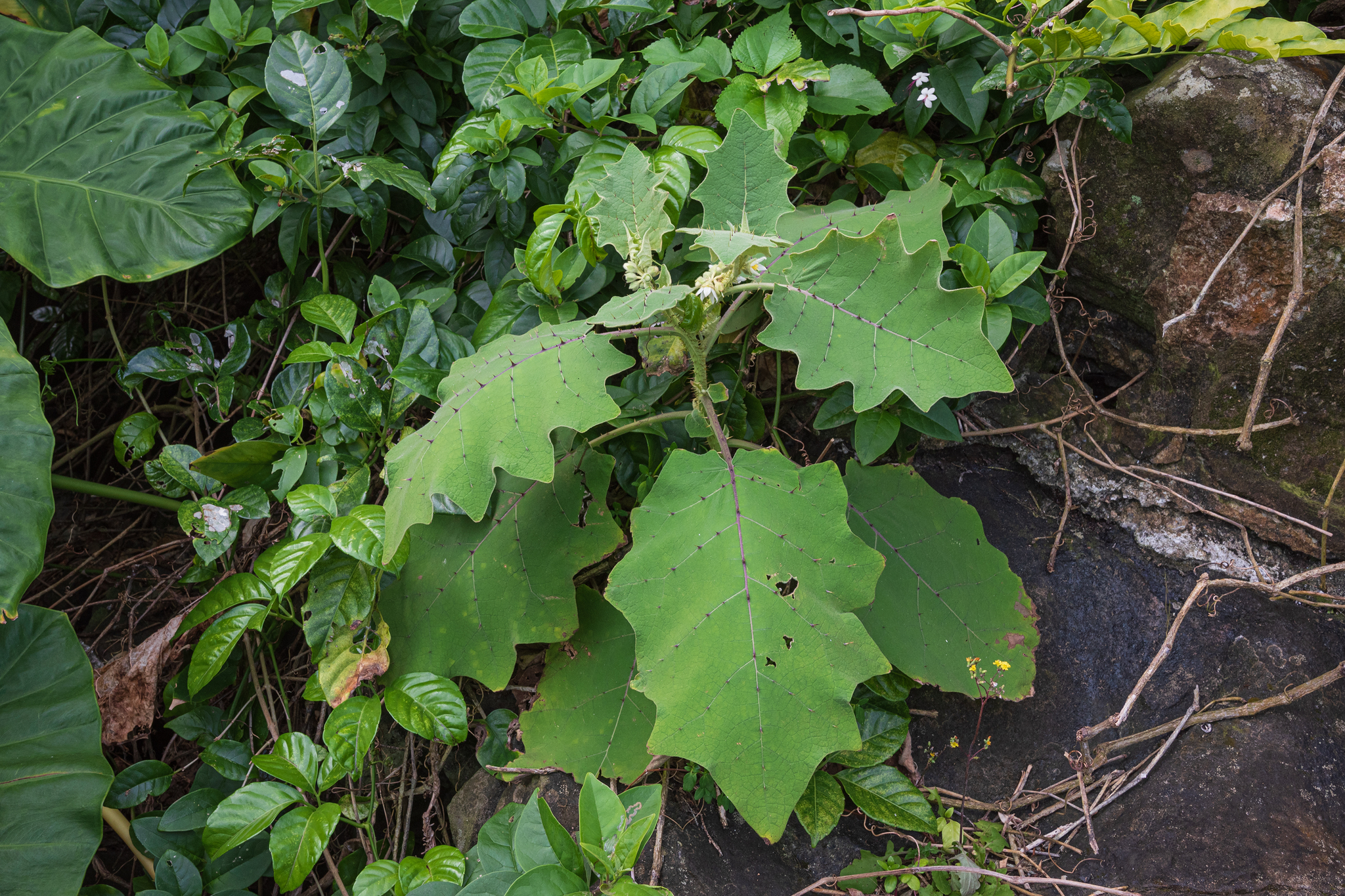

Scientific classification
- Kingdom: Plantae
- Clade: Embryophytes
- Clade: Tracheophytes
- Clade: Angiosperms
- Clade: Eudicots
- Clade: Asterids
- Order: Solanales
- Family: Solanaceae
- Genus: Solanum
- Species: S. lasiocarpum

Binomial name
- Solanum lasiocarpum Dunal

Synonyms
- Solanum ferox L.; Solanum hirsutum Roxb.; Solanum indicum L. Solanum immane; Hance ex Walp. Solanum lasiocarpum var. domesticum; Heiser Solanum quadriloculare; Spreng. Solanum stramoniifolium; Pav. ex Dunal Solanum zeylanicum; Blanco

= Solanum lasiocarpum =

Species of flowering plant

Solanum lasiocarpum, synonym Solanum ferox L., otherwise known as Indian nightshade or hairy-fruited eggplant, is a plant that produces edible fruit. Its flowers are white and its fruits are pale yellow.

S. lasiocarpum is found wild in parts of temperate and tropical Asia: the Andaman Islands, Sri Lanka, Indochina, south China, Taiwan, much of Malesia, Papuasia and Queensland, Australia. In other countries it is primarily known as a domesticated plant. Domesticated plants bear larger fruits and lack the prickly skin that is found in the wild plants. The color found in the center of fruit is light green, like that of Solanum quitoense. It's cultivated in tropical Asia, used in food additives for flavoring, and given to the sick as a folk medicine. In India, the locals use the fruit as a sour-relish in curries. In Thailand, a special kind of sauce called nam prek is made with the fruit. In Tonga, where the fruit known as the touloku was used similarly to the tomato and as such was displaced when the introduced latter became more popular.

Solanum lasiocarpum is of interest to botanists because of its strong resemblance to, and apparent close relation to South American species, the cocona (S. sessiliflorum), the naranjilla (S. quitoense), and the pseudolulo (S. pseudolulo) in particular. When grown outside of their native range, all four of those plants will readily hybridize, producing sterile offspring. This has some potential to enhance the commercial viability of each of those species elsewhere in the world.
