= Panela =

Unrefined whole cane sugar, typical of Latin America

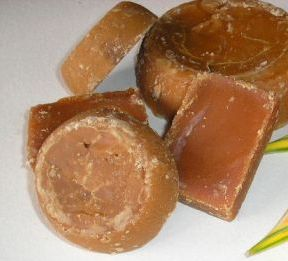
- Alternative names: Piloncillo, chancaca
- Region or state: Latin America
- Main ingredients: Whole cane sugar
- Similar dishes: Jaggery, palm sugar

Piloncillo
Nutritional value per 100 g (3.5 oz)
- Energy: 1,600 kJ (380 kcal)
- Carbohydrates
- Sugars: 86.4 g
- Fat: 0.1 g
- Protein: 0.2 g
- Other constituents: Quantity
- Water: 12.3 g
- Calcium: 79 mg
- Magnesium: 81 mg
- Iron: 12 mg
- Source: "Chancaca, Panela, Piloncillo, Raspadura, Black sugar, organico". Archived from the original on 23 October 2021.

Panela (Spanish pronunciation: [paˈnela]) or rapadura (Portuguese pronunciation: [ʁapaˈduɾɐ]) is an unrefined whole cane sugar, typical of Latin America. It is a solid form of sucrose derived from the boiling and evaporation of sugar-cane juice. Panela is known by other names in Latin America, such as chancaca in Chile, Bolivia, and Peru, piloncillo in Mexico (where panela refers to a type of cheese, queso panela). Just like brown sugar, two varieties of piloncillo are available; one is lighter (blanco) and one darker (oscuro). Unrefined, it is made from crushed sugar cane: the juice is collected, boiled, and poured into molds, where it hardens into blocks. It is a form of non-centrifugal cane sugar (NCS). Other traditional NCS include jaggery, which is used in South Asia.

Panela is sold in many forms, including liquid, granulated, and solid blocks, and is used in the canning of foods, as well as in confectionery, soft drinks, baking, and vinegar, beer, and winemaking.

== Economics ==
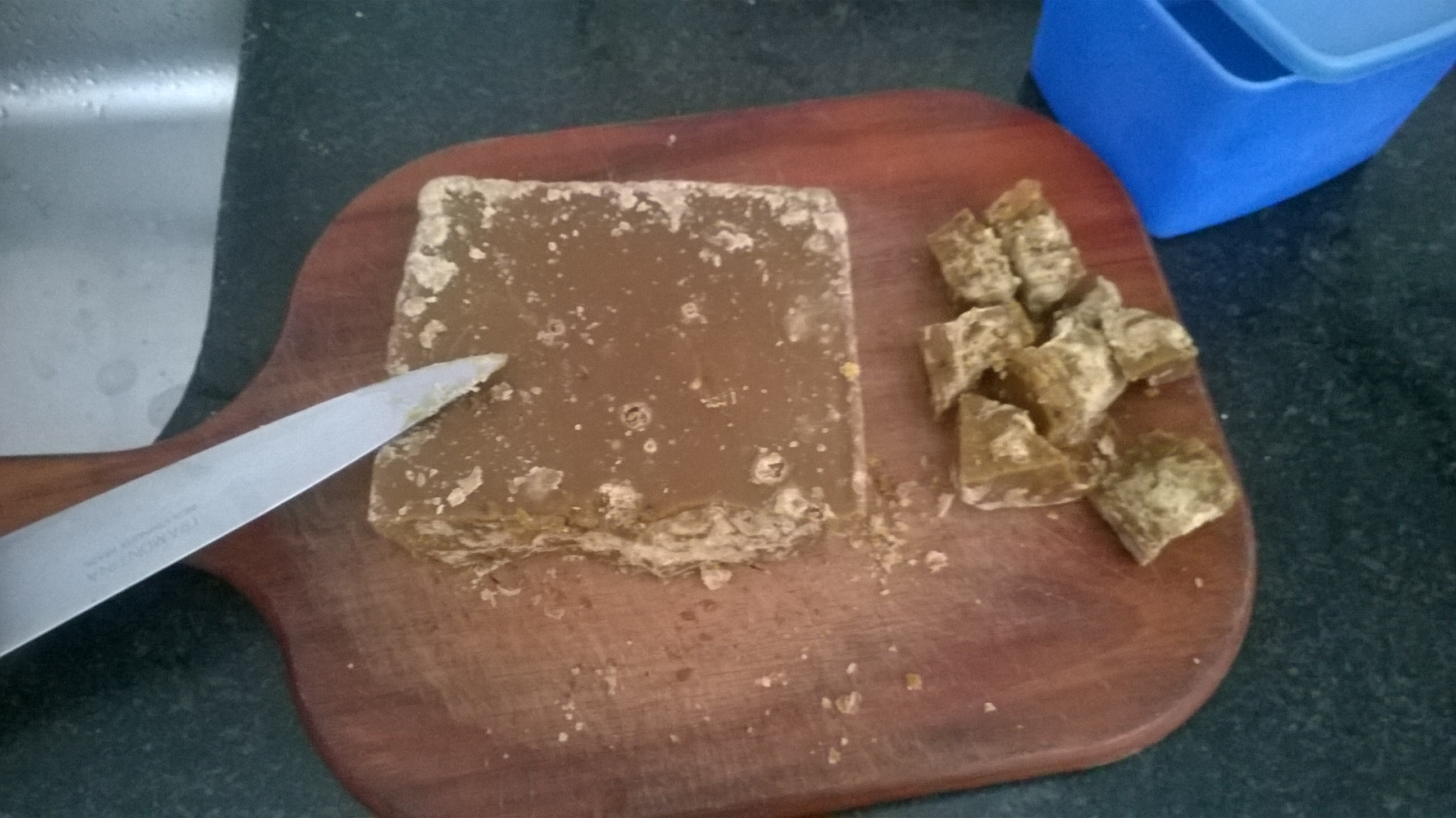
Brazilian rapadura in tablet

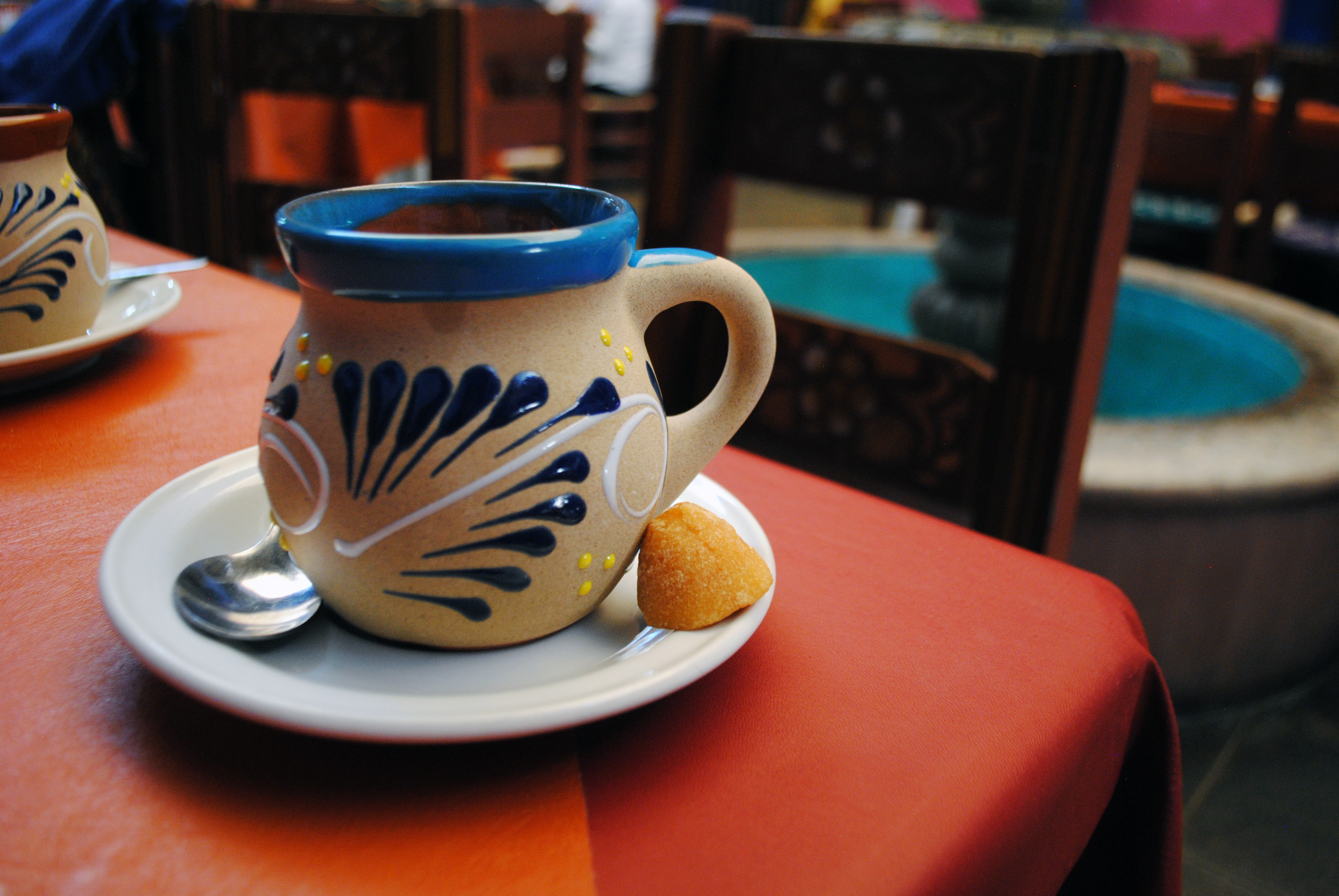
Mexican café de olla served with a lump of piloncillo

The main producer of panela is Colombia (about 1.4 million tons/year), where panela production is one of the most important economic activities, with the highest index of panela consumption per capita worldwide. Panela is also produced in Ecuador, Guatemala, Mexico, Panama, Peru, Chile, Venezuela, Brazil, and Bolivia (where it is called chankaka or empanizao).

In Colombia, the panela industry is an important source of employment, with about 350,000 people working in nearly 20,000 trapiches (panela farms). In 2003, Colombian sugarcane contributed 4.2% of the value of agricultural production (not counting coffee) and 1.9% of national agricultural activity of that country. That year, it was ninth in contributions to production value.

Similarly, it represents 10.7% of the area for permanent crops and 6.2% of the total area cultivated in Colombia, sixth place among the country's crops, behind only coffee, corn, rice, bananas, and cotton. This product is produced predominantly in the rural economy, the basic economy of 236 municipalities in 12 national departments.

An estimated 70,000 farm units cultivate sugarcane for mills, which generate more than 25 million annually in wages, employing around 350,000 people, or 12% of the economically active rural population, making it the second-largest employer after agricultural coffee production.

Worldwide, the Colombians are the largest consumers of sugarcane, at more than 34.2 kg (75 lb) per capita. To the extent it is a low-cost sweetener with important contributions of minerals and trace amounts of vitamins, high intake occurs mainly in strata. Panela consumption represents 2.18% of expenditures on food and in some areas accounts for up to 9% of food expenditures in low-income sectors.

== Uses ==
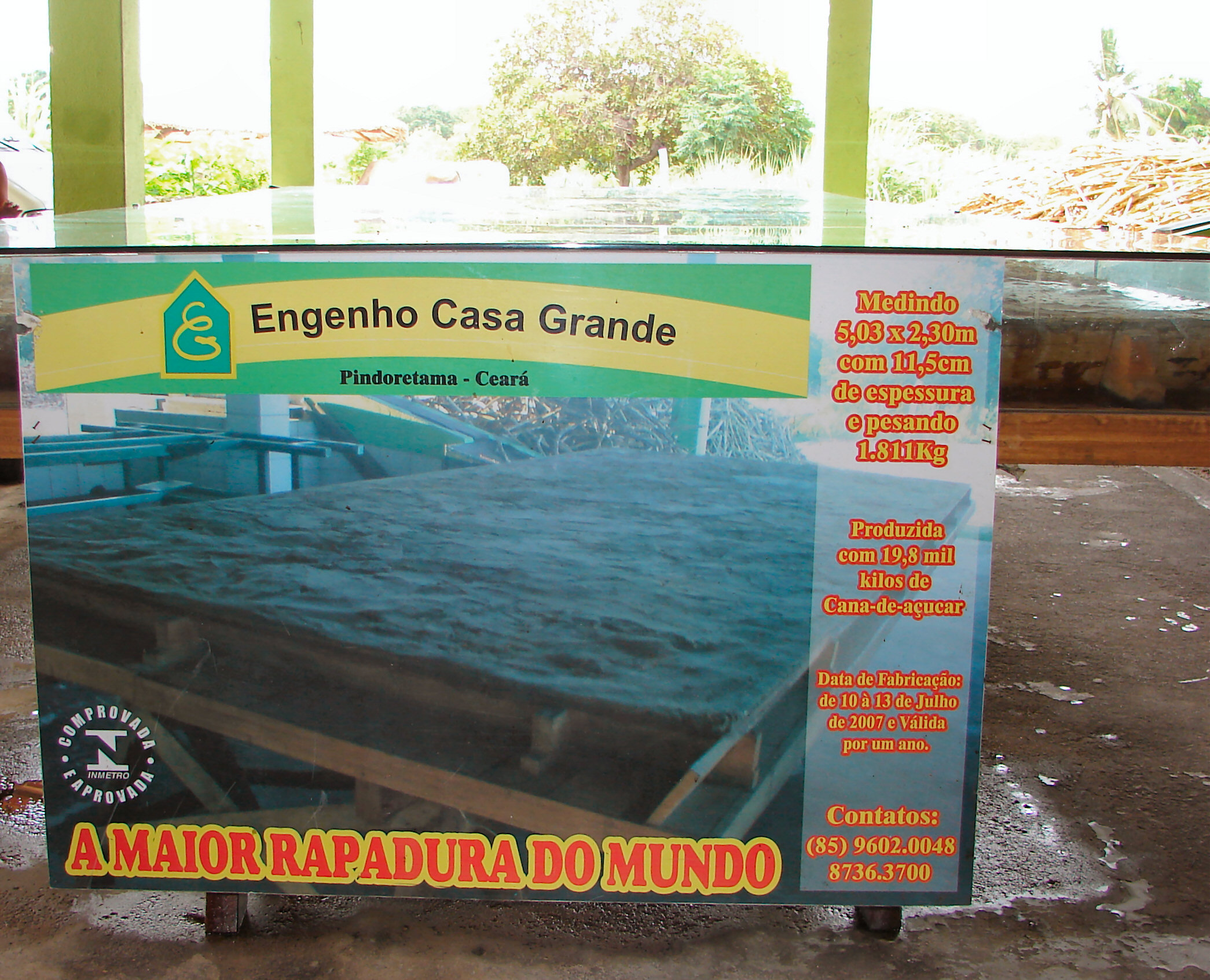
Claimed to be the world's largest rapadura, on display on a farm southeast of Fortaleza, Ceará

Panela was originally created as an easier way to transport sugar.

It is used to make chancaca. In Peru, chancaca is used in typical food such as champús, picarones, calabaza al horno, and mazamorra cochina. In Costa Rica, it is used in preparations such as tapa de dulce and agua de sapo. In Chile, it is used for sweet sopaipillas.

A very common use of panela in Colombia is for aguapanela, one of its most widely consumed beverages, and an important source of calories for working people, especially in rural areas. It is also used in the preparation of guarapo and various desserts. Since it is a very solid block, some Colombian homes have a hard river stone (la piedra de la panela) to break the panela into smaller, more manageable pieces. Panela can be purchased in markets, local grocers, and online stores. In parts of coastal Colombia, it is also used for chancacas.

Known as piloncillo in México, it is most often seen in the shape of small, truncated cones. Many Mexican desserts are made with piloncillo, such as atole, capirotada, champurrado, and flan. It is also blended with different spices, such as anise, cayenne, or chocolate.

In the Philippines, panocha, or in Tagalog: panutsá, is traditionally used as an ingredient for latík and kalamay, as well as a comfort food eaten straight.

In Venezuela, it is an essential ingredient for many typical recipes, although production of panela in the country dropped precipitously across the 20th century.

== Health claims ==
Panela manufacturers and advocates claim it is healthier than refined sugar, suggesting it has immunological benefits, a lower glycemic index, and higher micronutrient content. According to a 2012 review by Walter R. Jaffé of 46 academic publications, there is some scientific evidence to support these claims. The authors of The Ultimate Guide to Sugars and Sweeteners say that "it's still sugar", with only a trace amount more vitamins and minerals, and little research to support other claims.

== Regional names ==
- Chancaca (or chankaka) in Bolivia, Chile and Peru; also the name of a sweet sauce made from this
- Dulce de panela or dulce de atado in El Salvador
- Đường phên in Vietnam
- Empanizao in the Bolivian Amazon
- Nam oy in Laos
- Panela in Colombia, Ecuador, Guatemala, Venezuela, and other parts of Central America
- Panocha in the Mexican state of Sinaloa
- Panutsá in the Tagalog language (also panocha, among other names) in the Philippines
- Papelón in Venezuela
- Piloncillo ("little pylon", so named for the cone shape) in Mexico and Spain
- Rapadou in Haiti
- Rapadura in Argentina, Brazil, the Canary Islands, Cuba, Honduras, Panama, Paraguay, Uruguay and the Dominican Republic
- Raspadura in Cuba, Ecuador, Panama and Uruguay
- Tapa de dulce or Dulce (de tapa) in Costa Rica and Nicaragua

== See also ==
- Caramelization
- Palm sugar
- Papelón con limón, a drink made with panela
- Peen tong, a Chinese slab brown sugar and sugar candy
