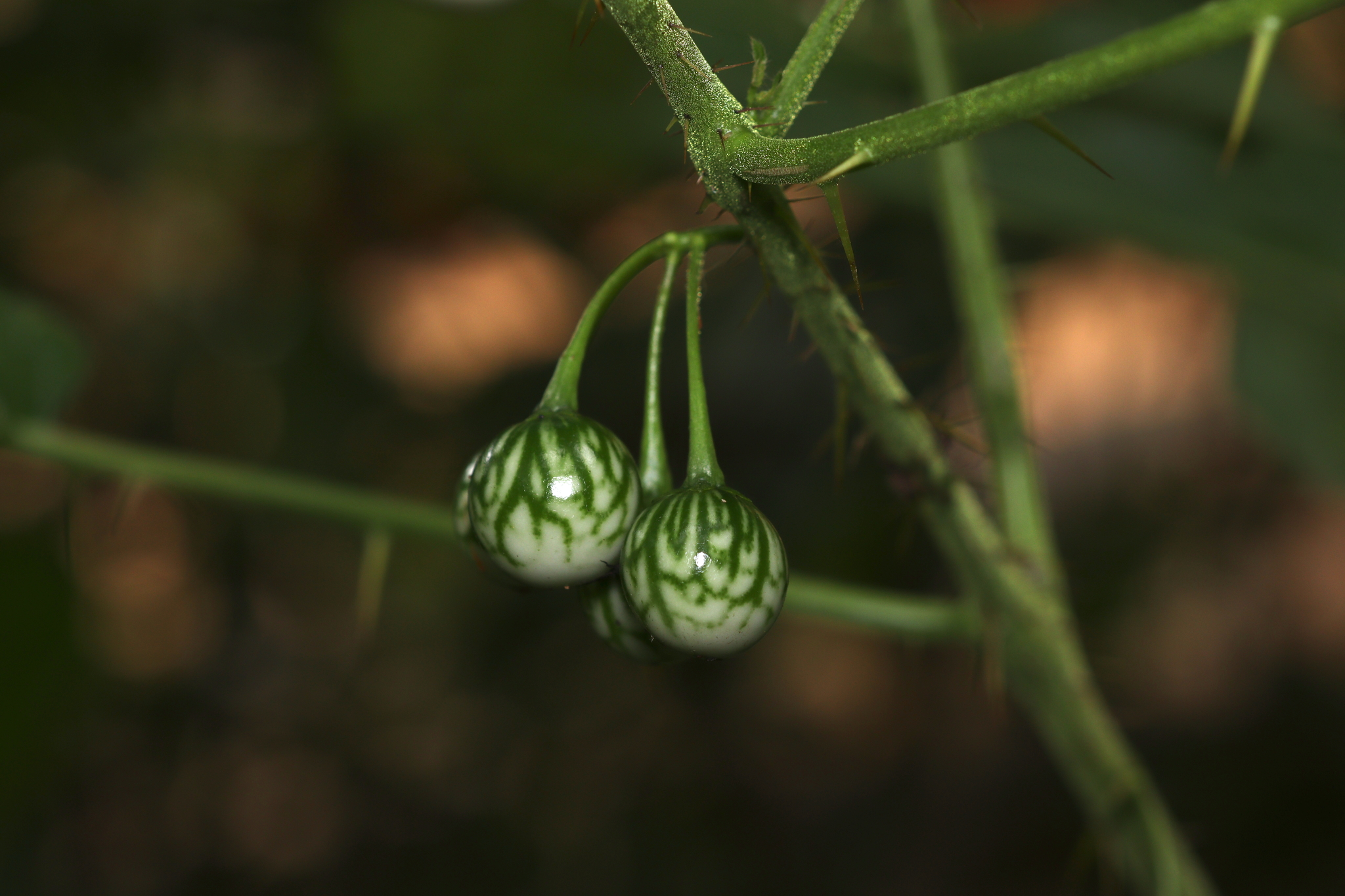

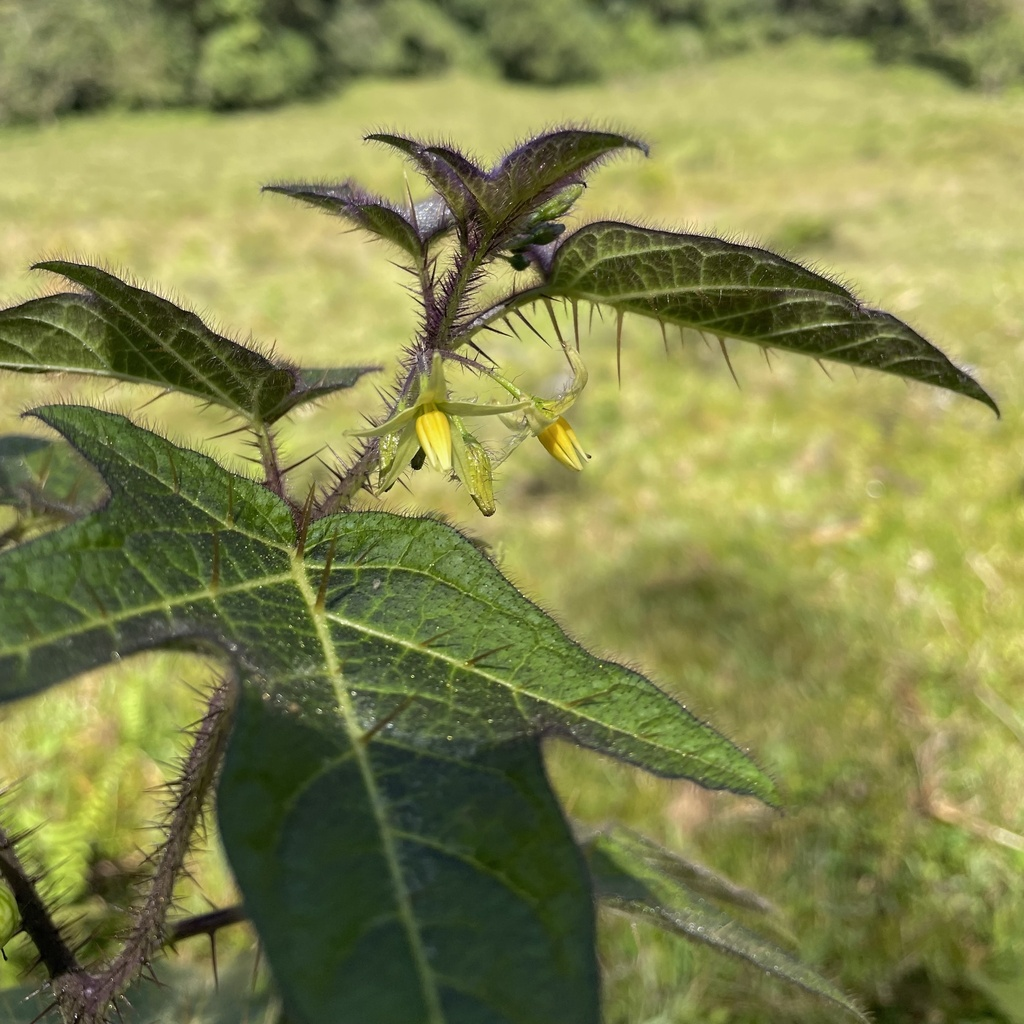

Scientific classification
- Kingdom: Plantae
- Clade: Tracheophytes
- Clade: Angiosperms
- Clade: Eudicots
- Clade: Asterids
- Order: Solanales
- Family: Solanaceae
- Genus: Solanum
- Species: S. acerifolium

Binomial name
- Solanum acerifolium Humb. & Bonpl. ex Dunal

Synonyms
- Solanum acerosum Sendtn.; Mart., Fl. Bras.; Solanum arcuatum Sendtn.; Mart., Fl. Bras.; Solanum hastatum Mart. ex Sendtn.; Mart., Fl. Bras.; Solanum luteovirescens Dunal; Prodr. [A. DC.]; Solanum quinquangulare Willd. ex Roem. & Schult.

= Solanum acerifolium =

Species of shrub

Solanum acerifolium is a species of small flowering shrub that belongs to the Solanaceae family, commonly known as the nightshade family. The species description was first published by a French botanist, Michel Félix Dunal in 1816.

== Description ==
Solanum acerifolium is a herbaceous plant that stands upright and is typically found reaching heights between 0.5 to 3 m (1 ft 8 in to 9 ft 10 in) in height, usually growing for a single stem but occasionally multiple coming from the base. Stems are pubescent with viscid-villous hairs and prickles that are straight and acicular. Acicular prickles appear densely armed along all parts of the stem. Prickles are usually 0.1 to 1.5 centimeters in length. Upper flowering branches usually carry fewer prickles and appear more glabrous except for the viscid-villous hairs.

=== Leaves ===
Leaves on S. acerifolium are around 5 to 18 cm (2.0 to 7.1 in) long and 4 to 15 cm (1.6 to 5.9 in) wide. Leaves can be single or in pairs. Leaves are broadly ovate or elliptic in shape and are usually 4-lobed with an acute apex. On both surfaces of the leaves are pubescent, and covered in viscid-villous hairs. Both surfaces of the leaves carry prickles along the major veins, similar in size to those found along the stems. The petioles of leaves measure 4 to 9 cm (1.6 to 3.5 in) and have a pubescence similar to that of stems.

=== Inflorescence ===
Inflorescence found on the S. aceriolium is extra-axillary and unbranched measuring 6 to 40 mm (0.24 to 1.57 in). The inflorescence is characterized as a subumbellate raceme. Typically holding 3 to 10 flowers that develop 1 to 8 fruit. The peduncles are pubescent, similar to the stem with few prickles, less than 5 mm (0.20 in) long, and sometimes absent. Peduncles measure from 0.5 to 3.5 cm (0.20 to 1.38 in) and rachis of the inflorescence measure up to 1 cm (0.39 in) long. The pedicles are 8 to 15 mm (0.31 to 0.59 in) in length for the flower and 15 to 25 mm (0.59 to 0.98 in) long for the fruit. The distal portion of the pedicles becomes thicker growing towards the fruit.

=== Flowers ===
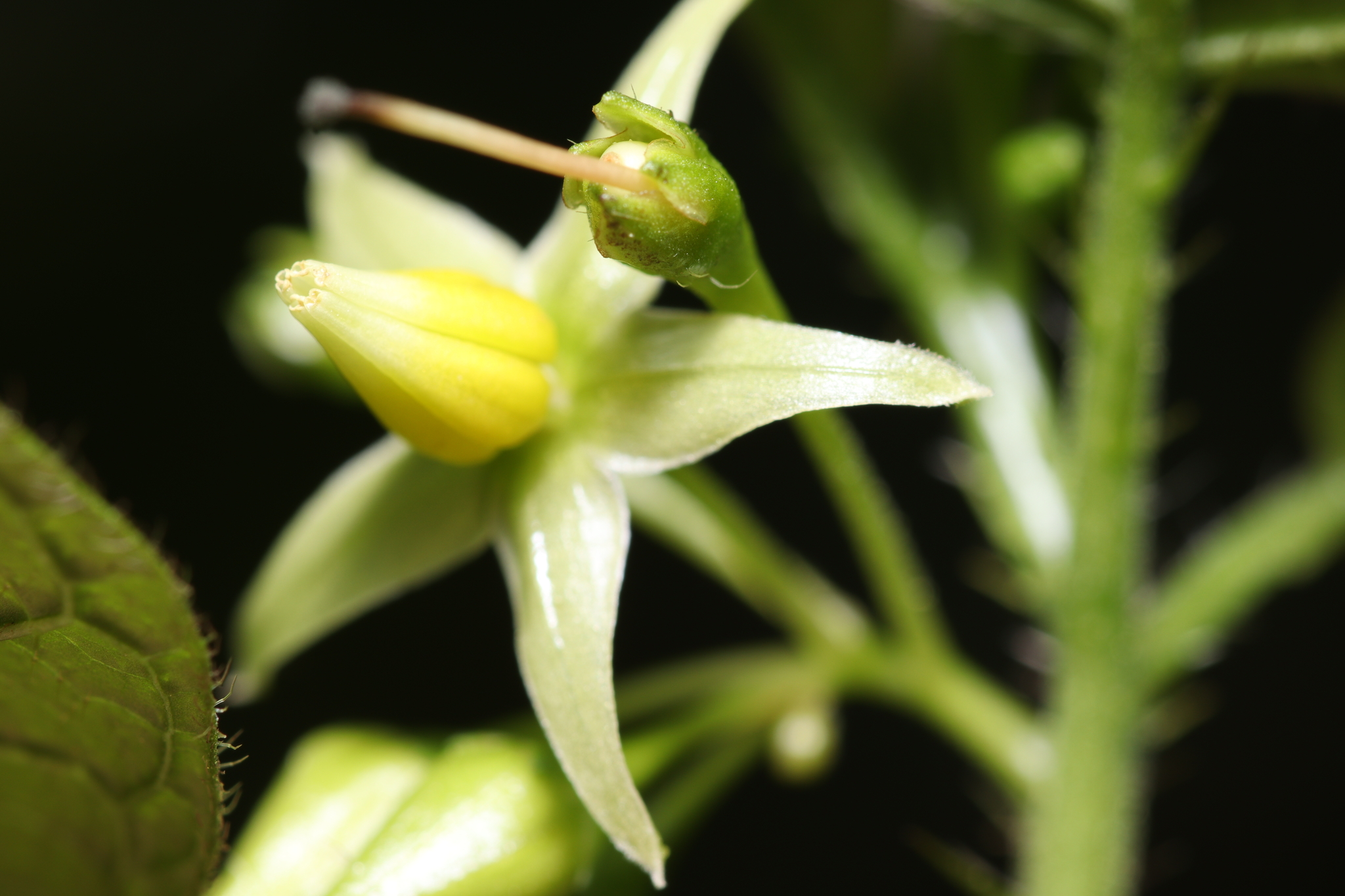
Flower of S. acerifolium

Species in the Solanum genus, including Solanum acerifolium, have bisexual, actinomorphic flower. Flowers found on the S. acerifolium have a calyx and corolla part perianth. The calyx is 2 to 4 mm (0.079 to 0.157 in) long with deep triangular lobes. The corolla can be found greenish-yellow or brownish-yellow in colour, and are stellate in shape, 1 to 2 centimeters in diameter. The anthers of the flower are 5 mm (0.20 in) long and taper to a point.

=== Fruit ===
The fruits found on S. acerifolium are shiny and globose with a viscid exterior. The fruit has a green and white marbled pattern and is 1 to 2 centimeters in diameter.

=== Seeds ===
A single fruit will hold around 60 seeds and are black, and flattened with winged margins. Seeds are 3 to 4 mm (0.12 to 0.16 in) in diameter.

== Reproduction ==
=== Pollination ===
Many species in the Solanum genus including Solanum acerifolium are visited by buzzing bees and undergo buzz-pollination. Buzz-pollination is the mechanical shaking of the flowers' anthers, while in contact with the bodies of buzzing bees.

=== Seed dispersal ===
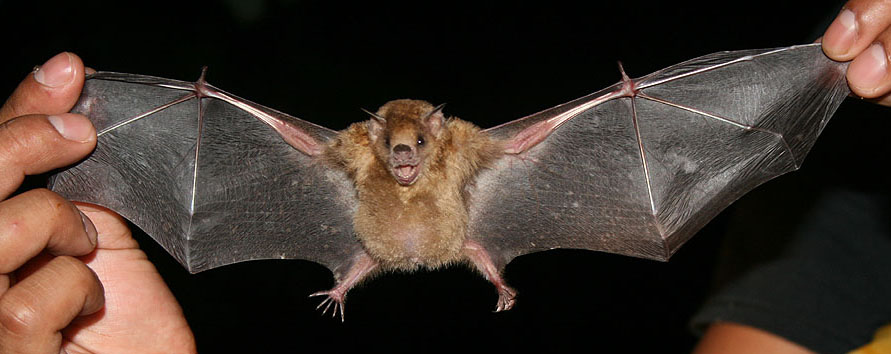
Little yellow-shouldered bat. Wings are spread to show wing span.

Species in the Solanum genus featuring smaller fruit and winged seeds, like S. acerifolium, utilize bird-mediated dispersal as a mechanism of dispersal. A study published in Biota Colombiana studied the relationship between bats and seed dispersal to evaluate the contribution to tropical forest regeneration. The study took place in Breman-La Popa Firest Reserve in Colombia, located on the western slopes of the Central Cordillera of the Colombian Andes, where they observed distinct successional stages such as mature subandean forest, secondary growth with seven years and growth with one year of regeneration. Out of the species examined for seed dispersal, Solanum Acerifolium was among those whose seeds were dispersed by bats significantly more often. Interestingly enough, other Solanum species such as Solanum undullata and Solanum aphydendro were also among that group. In many tropical regions, bats and birds are the predominant dispersers of seeds within and outside tropical forests. Seed collection was done by collecting feces samples from bats and seeds were compared to botanical collections upon analysis. The four bats that were captured for the majority of the study were Sturnira lilium, Artibeus lituratus, Carollia brevicauda and Artibeus jamaicensis.

== Predation ==
Although there is minimal literature regarding the defense mechanism of specifically Solanum acerifolium, there is evidence that plants with glandular hairs, also known as trichomes and prickles, act as a defense mechanism against herbivorous predators. There have been many studies regarding the defensive function of prickles, glandular hairs, and spines of plants against mammalian herbivores, but these dermal tissues also defend against Lepidoptera larvae.

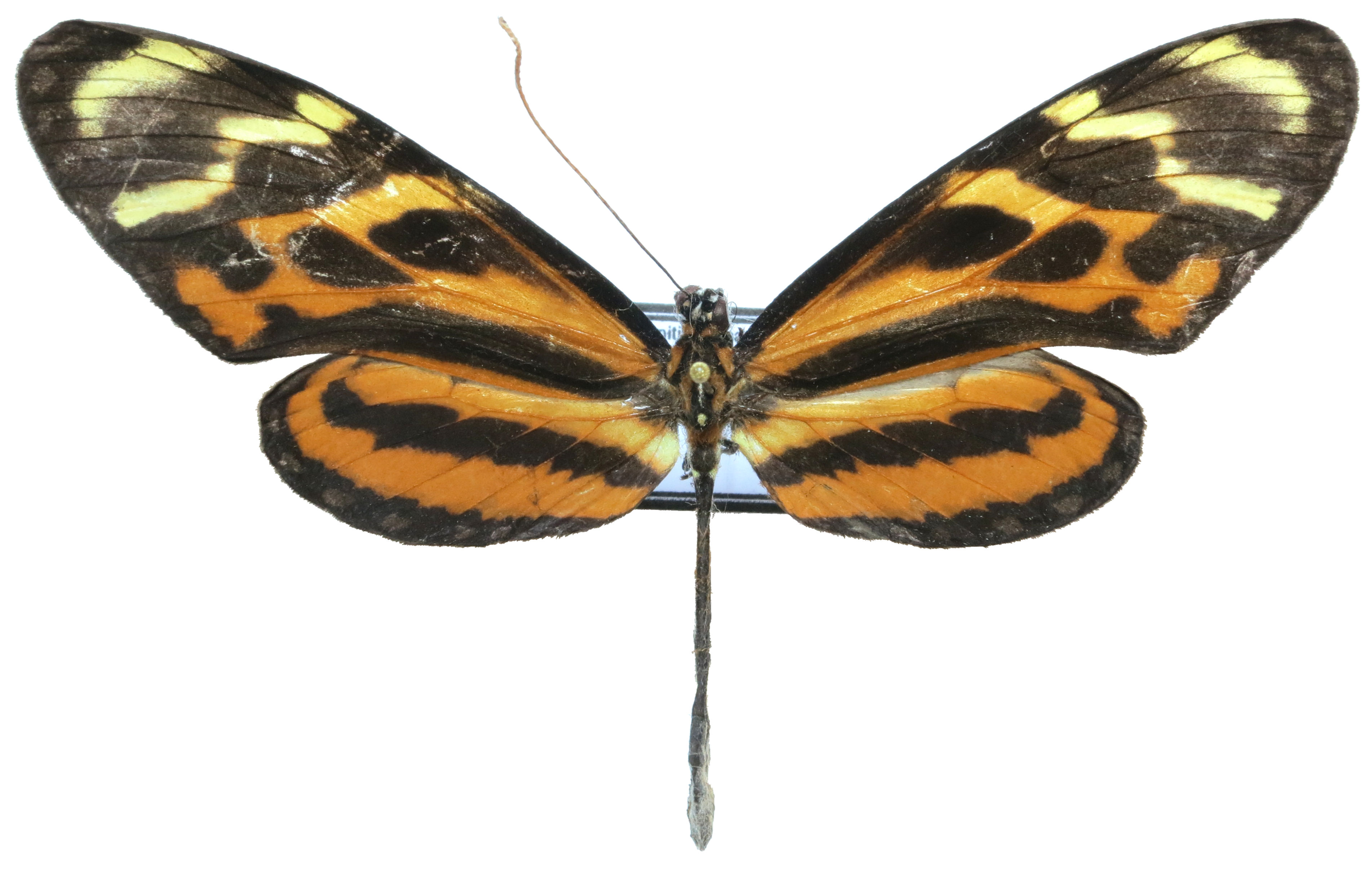
Mechanitis menapis, species of butterfly of the family Nymphalidae.

A forest-edge butterfly (Mechanitis menapis), is known to specialize on plants in the family Solanaceae. The most common host plant of Mechanitis menapis is the native Solanum acerifolium specifically in their larval stage. Mechanitis menapis also utilizes S. acerifolium as a host plant for laying eggs. After hatching, larvae start feeding on the epidermis of the plant.

== Habitat ==
Solanum acerifolium is capable of populating many different habitats including forest clearings, pastures, roadsides, and ravines. S. acerifolium has also been correlated with growing close to and inside coffee plantations. It is possible that the commerce of coffee could be the reason for its success in distribution across countries in southern Mexico and South America. S. acerifolium is typically found at altitudes of 1200 to 2000 meters.

== Distribution ==
Solanum acerifolium can be found across two continents, spanning southern Mexico, Guatemala, Honduras, Nicaragua, Costa Rica, Panama, Trinidad, Colombia, Venezuela, Peru and eastern Brazil.

== Phenology ==
Throughout its range, S. acerifolium will flower and fruit all year long. Although, flowering and fruiting may occur seasonally depending on latitude. Solanum acerifolium is an annual species.

== Economic importance ==
There is little known regarding the economic status of this plant but, the status of this species in Brazil is "problematic", considered a weedy shrub.

== Phylogeny ==
Solanum acerifolium is classified within a specific group of species known for having distinct wing-like structures around the edges of their seeds, categorized within the Acanthophora clade of the Leptostemonum subgenus. Analysis strongly supports the Lasiocarpa as a sister clade to Acanthophora. The Solanum subgenus Leptostemonum contains approximately 350-450 species, and most species characterized buy the presence of hairs and prickles giving this group the common name of "spiny solanums". The Acanthophora clade includes some of the most vicious of the spiny solanums, as they carry needle-like needles throughout the whole plant and even among the leaves. This particular subsection, although unnamed, is strongly suggested to be closely related as sister to S. atropurpureum and S. tenuispinum according to research. Additionally, Solanum acerifolium is situated within the Leptostemonum clade of the Solanum genus. The Acanthophora clade, encompassing most of the species traditionally identified in Solanum section Acanthophora, forms a monophyletic group, including what was previously recognized as the S. mammosum species group.

== Genetic Information ==
=== Genome ===
The full genome of Solanum acerifolium has not yet been studied. Although there is 11 different studies published in the NCBI database that examine nucleotide base pairs of S. acerifolium ranging from 390pb to 2030bp of linear DNA. Solanum acerifolium also has a taxonomic identification number (ID: 238980) in the NCBI database. From the six related species (S. atropurpureum, S. capsicoides, S. myriacanthum, S. palinacanthum, and S. viarum) from the subgenus Acanthophora, chromosome counts show that all are diploids with 2n=22 or 2n=24. Although this study did not specify Solanum acerifolium, these species belong to, or are close relatives to the Anthanphora clade.

=== Genetic Data ===
There is one specimen record in for Solanum acerifolium on the Barcode of Life Database (BOLD) system database, that mined from GenBank, of the National Center for Biotechnology Information (NCBI). This record provides a DNA barcode from a nucleotides of 208bp of the nuclear genome, but does not share the locus used for the sequence. BOLD also provides identifiers such as a museum ID: (Bohs 2714 UT) and Sample and Field ID: (AY561261). The NCBI GenBank repository has 11 records for this species. The NCBI records offer sequences for genomic DNA, 18S ribosomal RNA, 26S ribosomal RNA, 5.8S ribosomal RNA, internal transcribed spacer 1, internal transcribed spacer 2, (rbcL) gene, partial cds, chloroplast and other gene sequences. No reference sequence for the whole genome or individual chromosome are currently available for Solanum acerifolium on NCBI.
