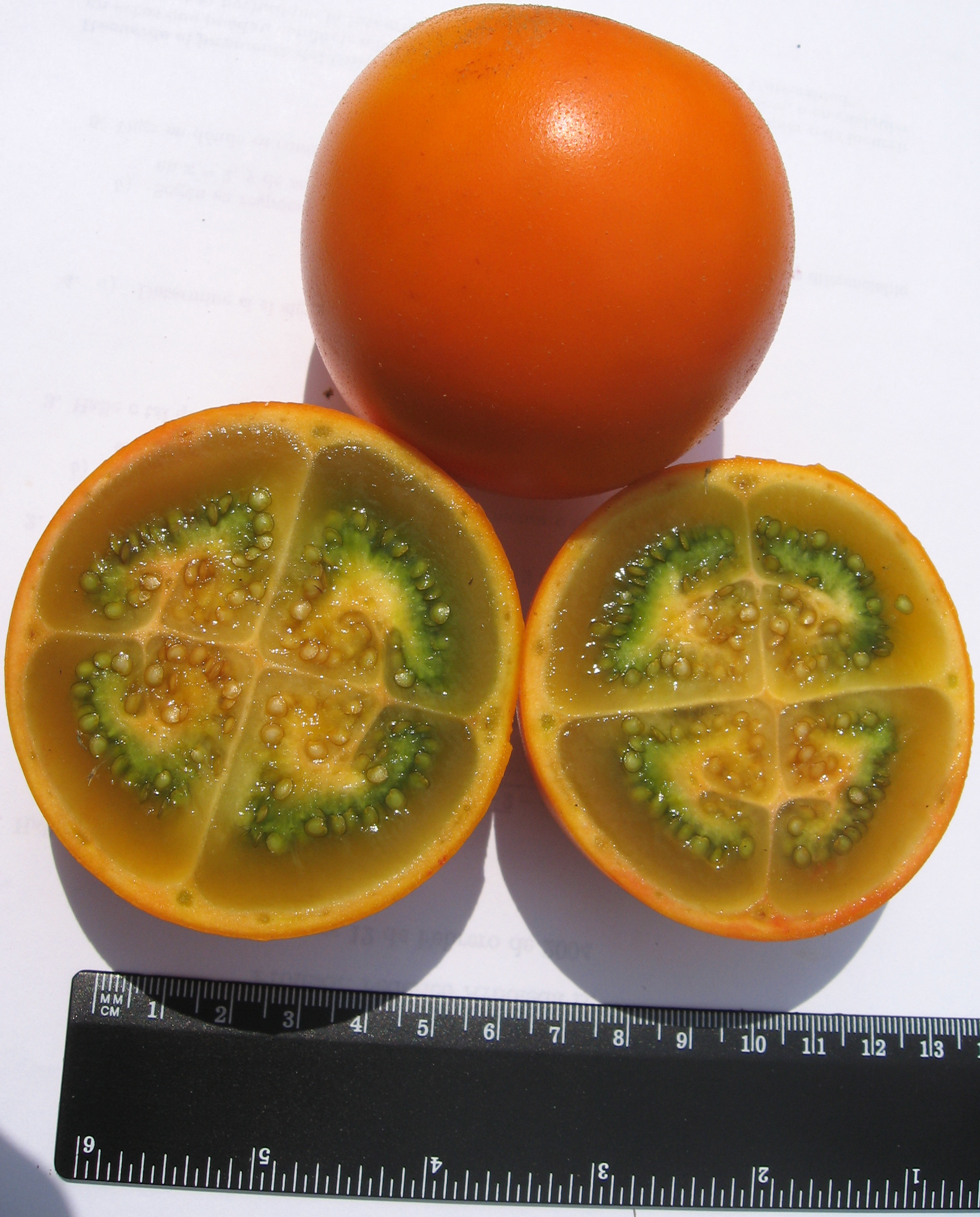
- Whole and transversely-cut fruit

Scientific classification
- Kingdom: Plantae
- Clade: Tracheophytes
- Clade: Angiosperms
- Clade: Eudicots
- Clade: Asterids
- Order: Solanales
- Family: Solanaceae
- Genus: Solanum
- Species: S. quitoense

Binomial name
- Solanum quitoense Lam.

Synonyms
- Solanum angulatum Ruiz & Pav.; Solanum macrocarpon Molina (non L.: homonym); Solanum macrocarpon Pav. ex Dunal in DC. (nomen nudum, homonym); Solanum nollanum Britton; Solanum quitense Kunth; Solanum quitoense f. septentrionale (R.E.Schult. & Cuatrec.) D'Arcy; Solanum quitoense var. septentrionale R.E.Schult. & Cuatrec.

= Solanum quitoense =

Species of plant

Solanum quitoense, known as naranjilla (Spanish pronunciation: [naɾaŋˈxiʝa], "little orange") in Ecuador, Costa Rica, Nicaragua, and Panama and as lulo ([ˈlulo], from Quechua) in Colombia, is a tropical perennial plant from northwestern South America.

== Description ==
The lulo plant stands 2.5 m (8 ft 2 in) high, and has large elongated heart- or oval-shaped leaves up to 60 cm (24 in) in length covered in short purple hairs. Naranjilla plants must be protected from strong winds and direct sunlight, growing best in partial shade.

The fruit has a citrus flavor, sometimes described as a combination of pineapple and lime. The juice of the naranjilla is green and is used as a juice or for a drink called lulada.

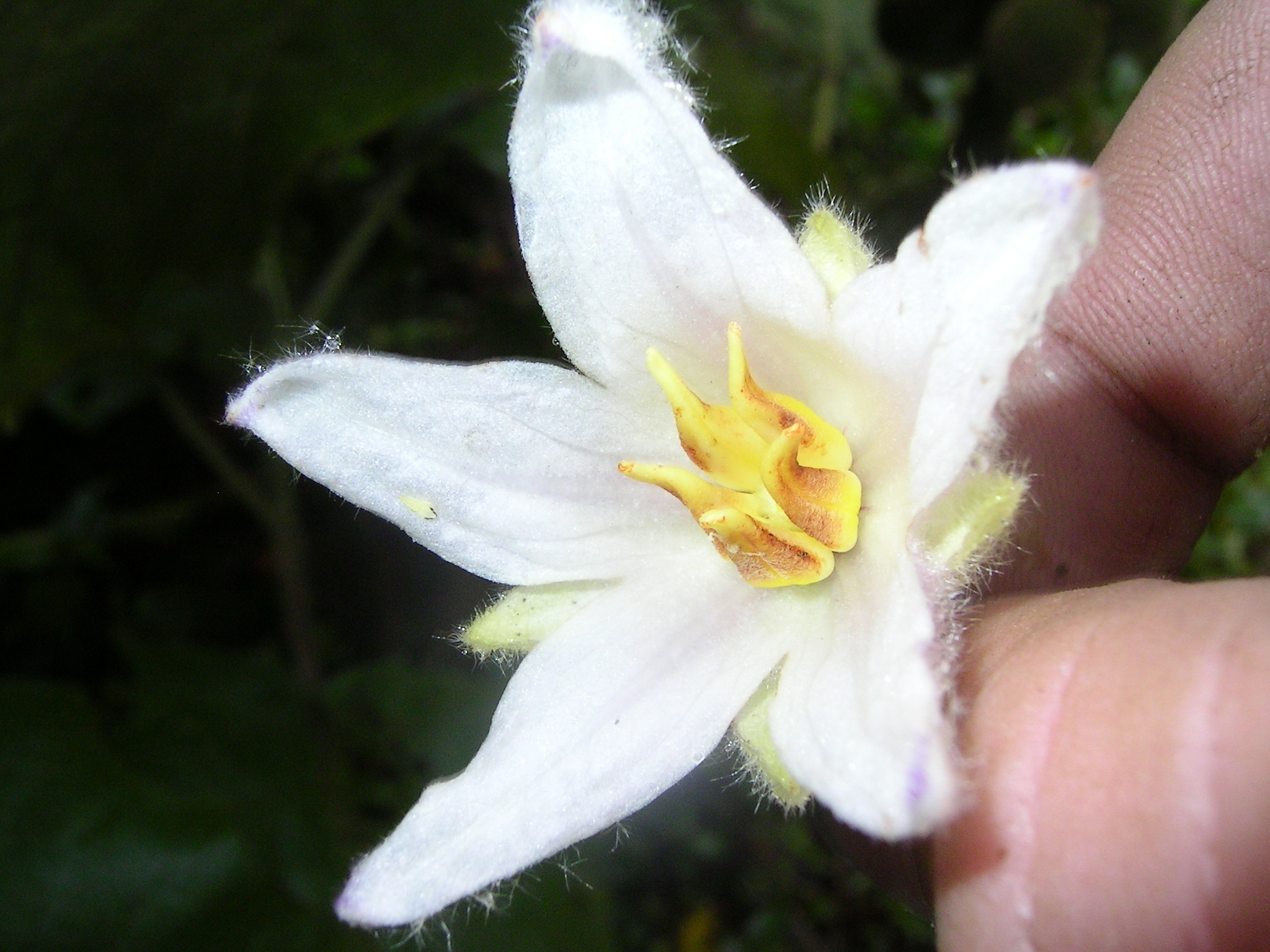
Flower

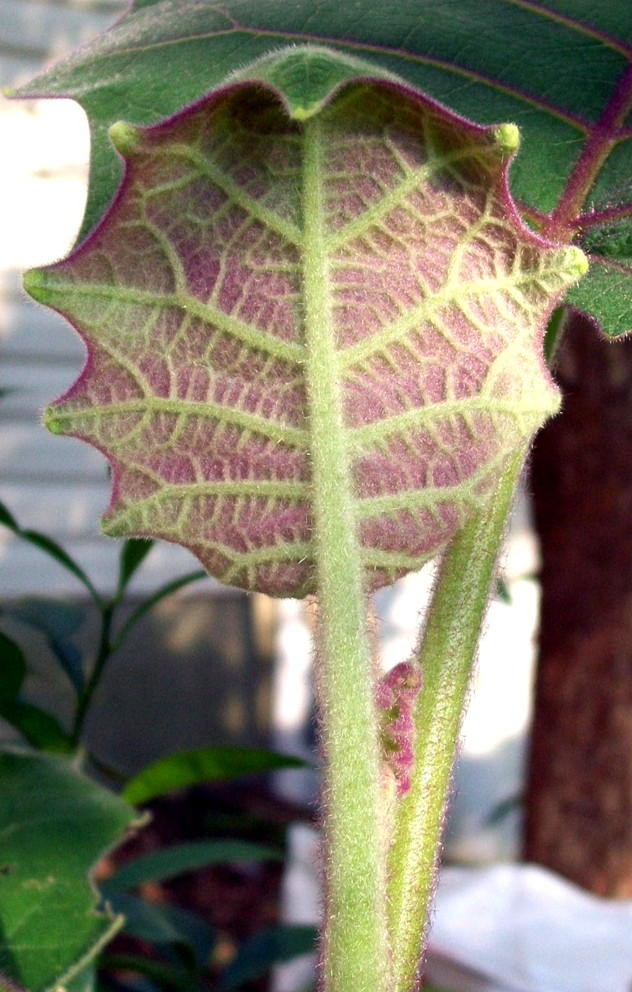
New leaf

Bud

Bud and young leaf

== Taxonomy ==
Within the genus Solanum, S. quitoense is a part of the subgenus Leptostemonum. Within this clade, S. quitoense belongs to the section Lasiocarpa. Other species within Lasiocarpa include S. candidum, S. hyporhodium, S. lasiocarpum, S. felinum, S. psudolulo, S. repandum and S. vestissimum.

Solanum quitoense resembles and can be confused with certain other species of Solanum (some closely related to S. quitoense and others less so), including S. hirtum, S. myiacanthum, S. pectinatum, S. sessiliflorum and S. verrogeneum. Furthermore, S. quitoense is somewhat variable in appearance, making identification challenging: at least three varietals (with spines, without spines, and a third variety known as baquicha, which features red-ripening fruits and smooth leaves) are known to occur. One characteristic that is unique to S. quitoense is the ring of green flesh within the ripe fruit. The only related fruit to have green flesh is a cultivated variant of S. lasiocarpum.

The new growth of Solanum quitoense is densely covered in protective trichomes, which vary in color from purple to white.

=== Etymology ===
The specific epithet means "from Quito".

== Distribution and habitat ==
The species is native to northwestern South America.

== Cultivation ==
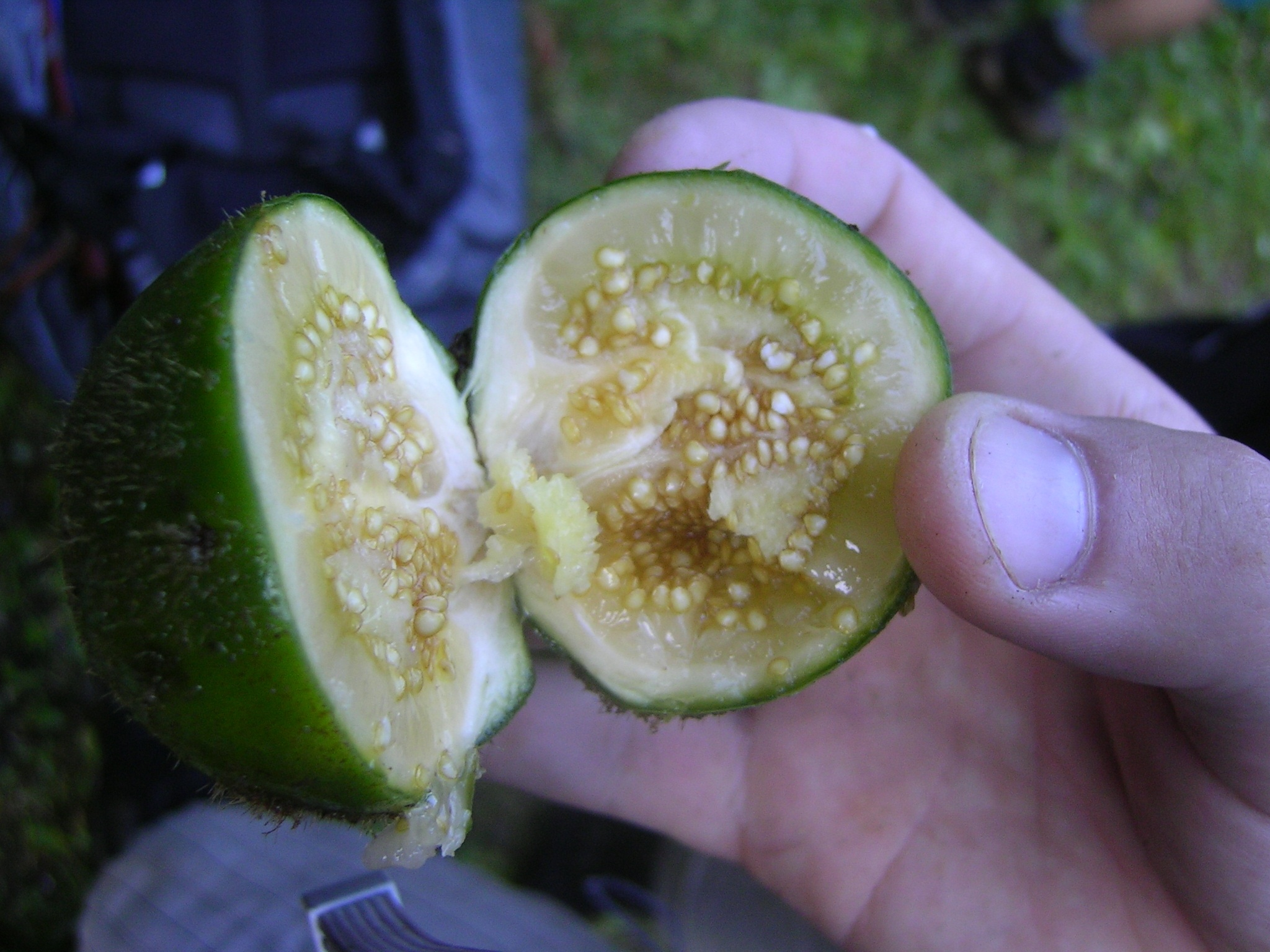
Unripe fruit

The naranjilla is not well-suited to large-scale cultivation. Its fruit, like tomatoes, is easily damaged when ripe, so is usually harvested unripe. The fruits are found at markets, and locals commonly prepare beverages by adding sugar and water to the freshly squeezed fruits.

=== Pests and diseases ===
Solanum quitoense has limited potential in large-scale agriculture due to the plant's extreme vulnerability to pests and diseases when grown as a crop. One common type of infection is caused by the root-knot nematode. The ripe fruit is also delicate and frequently attacked by fungus, especially when mechanically damaged, so it is often picked unripe to avoid rotting. S. quitoense-specific vascular wilt is caused by a fungus and leads to flaccid fruits and defoliation.

Hybrids are a solution to the nematode pest problem. S. quitoense has been hybridized with other Solanum species, most commonly with S. sessiliflorum, a plant with similar phenotypic traits. The leaves, flowers and fruits of S. sessiliflorum are similar in form to S. quitoense, but the fruits of the former are larger and yellow; the resulting hybrids have fruits with yellowish fruit pulp.

== Uses ==
Lulo fruit pulp is 87% water, 1% protein, 6% carbohydrates, has negligible fat, and contains minerals, vitamin C, and carotenoids. Its composition varies by growing conditions (region, genotype, cultivation).

Juice is the most common use of lulo fruit, which is also consumed fresh, in desserts, and in various native dishes.
