= Alimentos Polar =

Venezuelan food company, subsidiary of Empresas Polar

Alimentos Polar, C.A.
- Type: Private company
- Industry: Foods and Drinks
- Founded: 1954
- Headquarters: Caracas, Venezuela
- Key people: Lorenzo Mendoza (president)
- Products: Foods and Drinks
- Parent: Empresas Polar, C.A.
- Website: Alimentos Polar Site

Alimentos Polar, C.A. is an Empresas Polar subsidiary that operates in the foods and drinks area, manufacturing and sending deliveries to its clients.

== History ==
Alimentos Polar has its origins in 1954 with the creation of a corn processing plant established in Turmero to produce the corn flakes used by Cervecería Polar in beer production, and this allowed the company to gain experience in producing food products.

In 1960 a new corn processing plant opened for the production of the precooked corn flour Harina P.A.N., based on Venezuelan patent 5176, acquired by the family company from Venezuelan mechanical engineer Luis Caballero Mejías, who invented the respective industrial process in 1954 for his own company La Arepera, C.A. This launch made the preparation of the traditional Venezuelan arepa less laborious, since it no longer required pilado maize but precooked corn flour.

In 1986, the company built the Corporación Agroindustrial Corina for rice production and packaging, and the following year, it entered the pasta market with the company Mosaca. That same year, it acquired Heladerías EFE, one of the main ice creams companies in Venezuela.

In 1996, it started food business in Colombia, with offices in Bogotá and a production plant for precooked corn flour, oats, and ready-to-eat arepas in Facatativá, near the capital.

In 2003, the company was formally established as Alimentos Polar, integrating several Empresas Polar's food business under a single corporate structure.

=== Regulation by the government ===
On February 28, 2009 Venezuelan President Hugo Chávez ordered the military to temporarily seize control of all the rice processing plants in the country and force them to produce at full capacity, which he alleged they had been avoiding in response to the price caps instituted several years previously. For a period of 90 days the Instituto para la Defensa de las Personas en el Acceso a los Bienes y Servicios (Indepabis) supervised production at a number of rice processing plants, including Alimentos' Planta Calabozo Arroz plant in Guárico state. The minister for food, Félix Osorio, said the measure was temporary one and not intended to be a nationalisation.

The country's largest food processor, Empresas Polar, said that the regulated price of (plain) rice was well below the cost of production, and as a result 90% of its rice output was the flavoured rice not subject to price controls. It also said that its plant was operating at 50% capacity due to raw material shortages. Alimentos Polar processes around 6% of Venezuela's rice production.

== Products ==
- Harina P.A.N.
- Mazeite (Cooking oil)
- Alimentos Primor (Foods)
- Yukery (Drinks)
- Migurt (Yogurt)
- Mavesa (Margarine, Vinegar, Vegetable Oil and Mayonnaise)
- Toddy
- Helados EFE
