= Changua =

Traditional Colombian late night dish

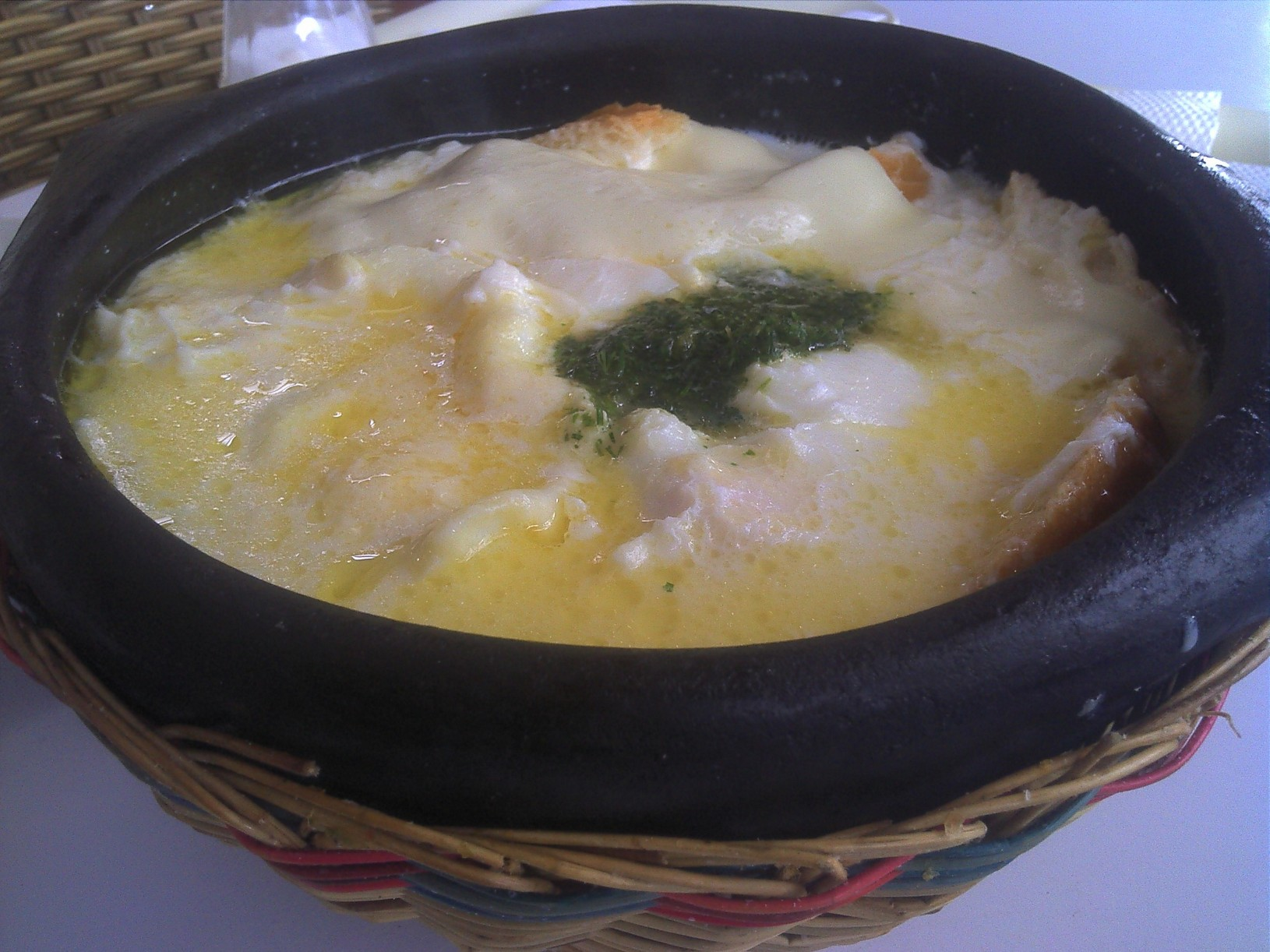
- Changua broth as served in many "Panaderías" (bread stores) in Bogotá, Colombia
- Type: Soup
- Course: Breakfast
- Place of origin: Bogotá
- Region or state: Colombia
- Associated cuisine: Colombia
- Serving temperature: Hot or room temperature
- Main ingredients: Water, milk, eggs, scallions

Changua (milk broth with eggs) is a typical hearty breakfast soup of the central Andes region of Colombia, in particular in the Boyacá and Cundinamarca area, including the capital, Bogotá. It also has a reputation as a hangover cure, being a popular late night meal.

The changua comes from the Muisca word "xie" which means water or river, and "nygua" that means salt. A mixture of equal amounts of water and milk is heated with a dash of salt. Once it comes to a boil, one egg per serving is cracked into the pot without breaking the yolk, and allowed to cook for about a minute while covered. The broth is served in a bowl, garnished with scallions, which may be fried beforehand but usually are not, curly cilantro, and a piece of stale bread called "calado" which softens in the changua. It is sometimes served with pieces of cheese which melt into the broth. Scallions and cilantro may be added as an option even while the soup boils.

Modern versions of changua include chicken stock instead of water, tomato concassé, chopped cilantro, almojábana and sweet corn arepas.

Caldo de huevo is a different version of changua, typical of Santander region, which includes potatoes in its preparation, and is served with arepas de maíz pelado (made of nixtamalized corn), also native of this region. Pisca andina, which is typical of the Venezuelan Andes, also resembles changua preparation and ingredients.

== See also ==
- List of soups
