= Harina P.A.N. =

First brand of boiled maize flour in Venezuela

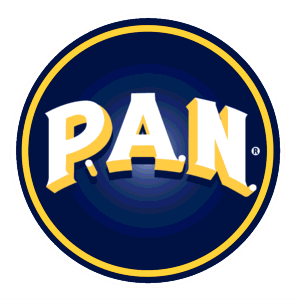
- Type: Private
- Founded: December 10, 1960
- Headquarters: Venezuela
- Key people: Luis Caballero Mejías
- Products: Maize flour
- Parent: Empresas Polar
- Website: https://allofpan.com

Harina P.A.N.—abbreviation for Producto Alimenticio Nacional (Spanish), or National Food Product (English)—is the first brand of boiled maize flour in Venezuela. The brand itself became a synecdoche, as it became a noun commonly used to indicate any similar maize flour.

== Usage ==
Harina P.A.N. is used to make maize flour dough, also known as "masa de arepa" or "masarepa", which is used to prepare Venezuelan dishes such as arepas, hallacas, empanadas, bollos pelones, and other Venezuelan dishes. Harina P.A.N. is commonly available in varieties made from white and yellow corn. It contains no additives or gluten and is considered suitable for people with dietary restrictions.

== History ==
The traditional preparation of arepa flour is very labor-intensive, requiring soaking, dehusking, and drying maize before pounding it in a large mortar.

Precooked arepa flour was invented in the 1950s by Dr. Luis Caballero Mejías, a Venezuelan engineer who used the profits from his patent to finance a Technical Schools system.

In 1954, the Venezuelan beer and malted drinks company Empresas Polar developed an industrial production method, launching the brand in 1960. Its spokesmen said that had been the idea of Czech master brewer Carlos Roubicek, one of the first employees of the Polar Brewery, and Juan Lorenzo Mendoza Quintero, son of the founder Lorenzo Mendoza Fleury, taking advantage of the Remavenca machinery and the corn flakes manufactured in that plant to improve the beer flavor. In fact, Empresas Polar does not accredit Luis Caballero Mejías, for the development of the process that served for the production of maize flour.

The brand name Harina P.A.N. was proposed by Empresas Polar's then President and Chairman of the Board Carlos Eduardo Stolk. He selected the acronym "P.A.N.", in Spanish "Producto Alimenticio Nacional", or in English, "National Food Product", "to represent a food product for mass consumption for all Venezuelans."

The original slogan was "Se Acaba la piladera", which means "No more pounding". The marketing has remained essentially unchanged since then. The precooked flour was later mass-produced and sold in larger quantities.

== Cultural influence ==
For decades, Harina PAN has been an essential ingredient for Venezuelans, and also in Colombian cooking, with websites dedicated to locating the nearest distributor in several countries in the world. Pre-made arepa flour is specially prepared for making arepas and other maize dough-based dishes, such as Venezuelan Hallaca, Bollo, and Empanada. The most popular brand names of corn flour are Harina PAN in Venezuela, and Areparina in Colombia. Pre-made arepa flour is usually made from white corn, but there are yellow corn varieties available.

To Venezuelans, Harina PAN forms a part of their national identity by making up a large portion of their diet.

Arepas are one of the most popular dishes made with Harina P.A.N. They are made by grilling or frying a dough made from the flour. Arepas can be filled with a variety of ingredients, such as cheese, meat, or beans. They are a popular breakfast food, but they can also be eaten at any time of day.

Cachapas are another popular dish made with Harina P.A.N. They are made by griddling a thin pancake made from the flour. Cachapas are typically filled with cheese and cooked corn kernels. They are often served with a side of meat or beans.

Hallacas are a traditional Venezuelan dish that is made during the Christmas season. They are made from a corn dough that is filled with a variety of ingredients, such as meat, beans, vegetables, and spices. Hallacas are wrapped in banana leaves and steamed. They are a labor-intensive dish, but they are considered a symbol of Venezuelan culture.

In addition to its culinary significance, Harina P.A.N. has also become a symbol of Venezuelan identity. It is a reminder of the country's agricultural heritage and its rich indigenous culture. Harina P.A.N. has also been used as a symbol of resistance during times of political and economic turmoil. During the recent economic crisis in Venezuela, Harina P.A.N. was one of the few foods that was still relatively affordable. As a result, it became a symbol of hope and resilience for many Venezuelans.

== See also ==
- Alimentos Polar
- Empresas Polar
