= Leonor Giménez de Mendoza =

Venezuelan business woman

- Born: Barquisimeto, Lara, Venezuela
- Occupation(s): Businesswoman, philanthropist

Leonor Giménez de Mendoza is a Venezuelan businesswoman and philanthropist. She was the president of Empresas Polar for five years and is president and founder of the Empresas Polar Foundation.

== Biography ==
Leonor Giménez was born in Barquisimeto, Lara State. She was educated at the Colegio María Auxiliadora in the same city. She spent a year in Montreal to improve her English. In 1956, after the death of her father, she travelled to Madrid with her mother. There she met Lorenzo A. Mendoza Quintero. In 1959 they married in Caracas where they established their residence and had six children: Elisa, Leonor, Isabel, Lorenzo, Patricia and Juan Simon. In 1976, she joined her husband in the leadership of Empresas Polar. Together, in 1977, they created the Empresas Polar Foundation. Later, after her husband's death in 1987, she led the company for five years and was a member of its board of directors.

She was also president of the Asociación de Damas Salesianas and member of the board of directors of the Centro de Atención Nutricional Infantil Antímano (CANIA), a non-profit institution created by Cervecería Polar in 1995.

== Awards and recognitions ==
- Paez Medal of Art (2021)
