= Carlos Eduardo Stolk =

Venezuelan lawyer, diplomat, and businessman

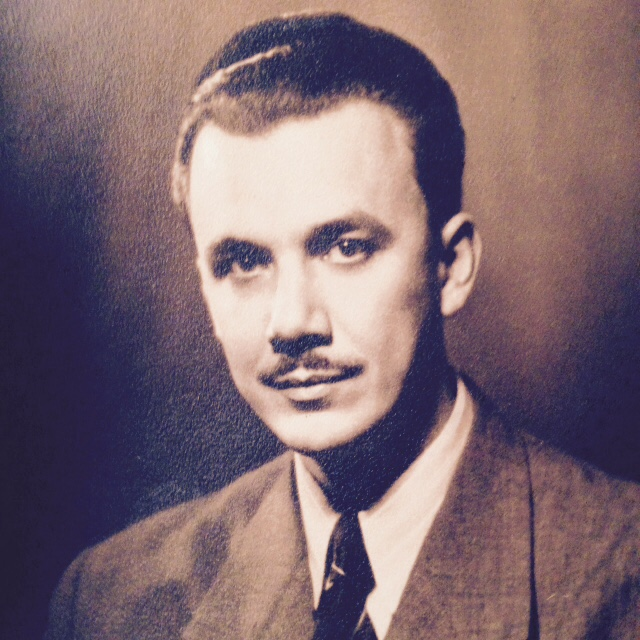
- Dr. Carlos E. Stolk (1948)
- Born: 4 April 1912; Caracas, Venezuela
- Died: 9 November 1995 (aged 83); Caracas, Venezuela
- Education: Central University of Venezuela
- Occupations: lawyer, diplomat, businessman
- Board member of: Empresas Polar
- Spouse: Nina Stolk
- Children: 6
- Website: Facebook Official

Carlos Eduardo Stolk Mendoza (4 April 1912 – 9 November 1995) was a lawyer, diplomat and business magnate who is well-known for his role as a delegate during World War II, as a founding representative of the United Nations and as chairman to various of its strategic committees. Stolk contributed to the establishment of the State of Israel after voting in favor of Resolution 181 (United Nations Partition Plan for Palestine) (1947) of the UN.

== Early life and education ==
Carlos Eduardo Stolk was born in Caracas, Venezuela to Teunis Felipe Stolk and Trinidad Mendoza. He earned a Juris Doctor and a Master in Political Science from Central University of Venezuela.

== United Nations ==
Carlos Eduardo Stolk was Chairman of the Delegation of Venezuela of the United Nations General Assembly and served his country in various capacities between 1945 and 1949. He was part of the Inter-American Juridical Committee and the Economic and Social Council. He served as Chairman of the Third Committee for Social, Humanitarian and Cultural Questions.

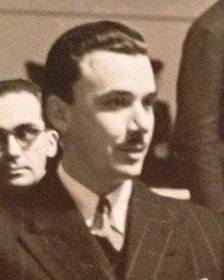
Dr. Carlos Eduardo Stolk (1949)

== Empresas Polar ==
He served as Chairman of the Board and President of Venezuela's largest privately held company Empresas Polar between 1952 and 1985. Under Stolk's leadership Fundación Polar (Empresas Polar's company-backed foundation and one of Venezuela's largest charities) was founded. Harina P.A.N., the company's food division's flagship product, was successfully launched with Dr. Stolk's own idea with the brand name "P.A.N.," in Spanish "Producto Alimenticio Nacional," or in English "National Food Product." Under his leadership, Polar Brewery's signature Pilsen product started distribution in the United States in 1985.

Carlos Stolk's first cousin, Lorenzo Alejandro Mendoza Fleury, was founder of the business conglomerate and his grandson, Lorenzo Mendoza, is the current third-generation family member managing Empresas Polar as their present CEO.

== See also ==
- List of Venezuelans
- United Nations Partition Plan for Palestine
- Central University of Venezuela - Notable Alumni
- Empresas Polar
- Harina P.A.N.
