= Paez Medal of Art =

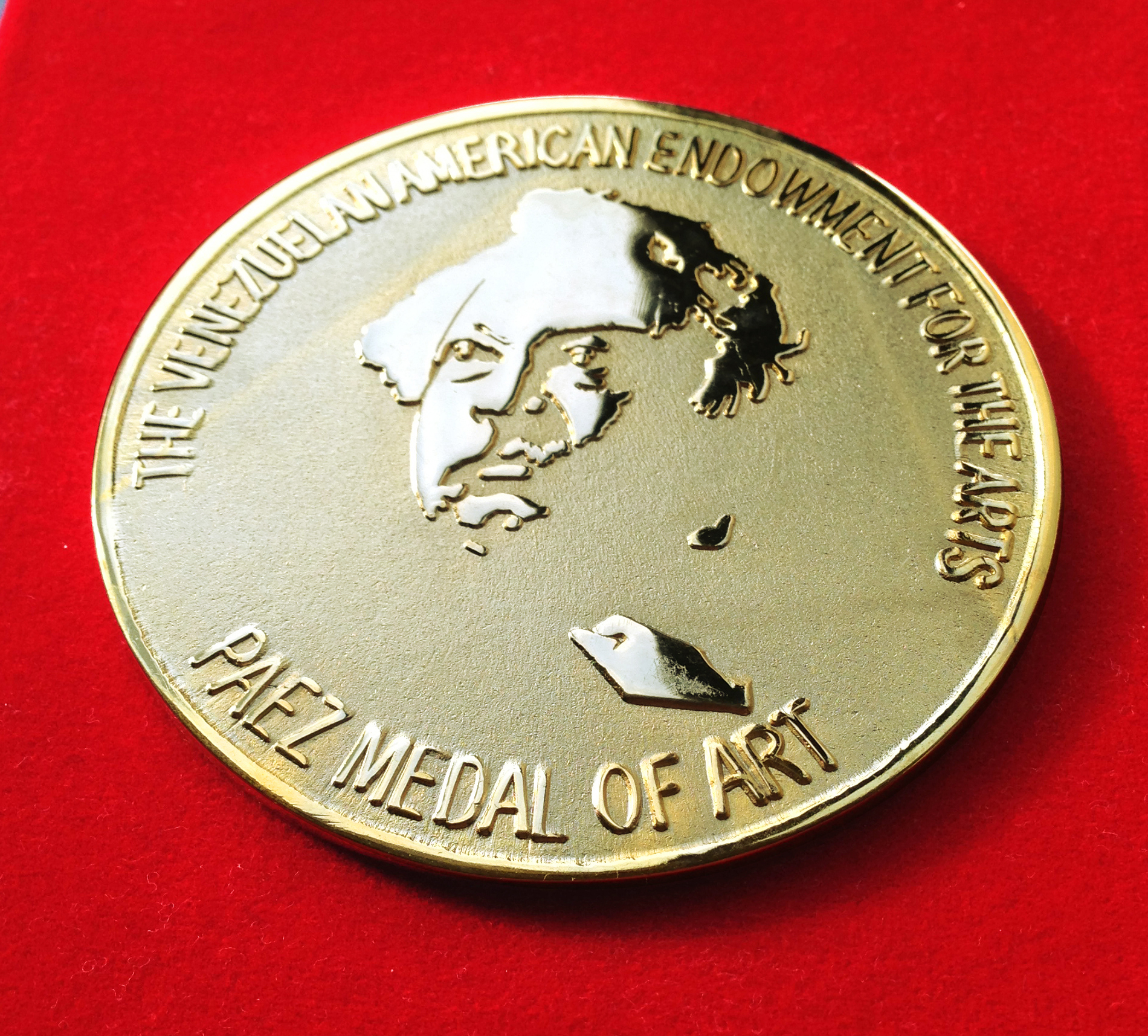
- Date: 2012
- Country: Venezuela, United States
- Website: vaearts.org/US/paez-medal-of-art

The Paez Medal of Arts is a decoration awarded by The Venezuelan American Endowment for the Arts (VAEA) that is presented to an individual or group that has had an impact and contributed to excellence, growth, support and the proliferation of the arts in Venezuela and the United States. It is named in honor of José Antonio Páez, leader of the Independence of Venezuela, who lived in exile the last years in New York, where he became a philanthropist.

== Recipients ==
- Carlos Cruz-Diez (2012)
- Robert Wilson (2013)
- Sofía Ímber (2014)
- Annie Leibovitz (2015)
- Marisol Escobar (2016)
- Bob Colacello (2017)
- Gustavo Dudamel (2018)
- Margot Benacerraf (2019)
- Julian Schnabel (2019)
- Frank Gehry (2020)
- James Alcock (2020)
- Fundacion Empresas Polar and its founder Leonor Giménez de Mendoza (2021)
- Joshua Bell (2022)
- Charles Brewer-Carías (2025)
