= Carlos Cruz-Diez =

Venezuelan artist (1923–2019)

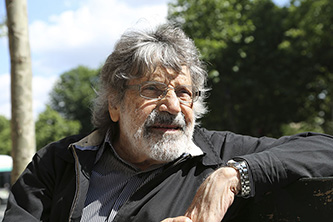
- Cruz-Diez in 2013.
- Born: Carlos Eduardo Cruz Díez; 17 August 1923; Caracas, Venezuela
- Died: 27 July 2019 (aged 95); Paris, France
- Resting place: Père-Lachaise Cemetery
- Citizenship: Panama City and Paris
- Education: Escuela de Bellas Artes de Caracas
- Occupation: Visual artist
- Known for: Kinetic art; Op art
- Notable work: Physicromie Series
- Style: Plastic arts, Op Art, Kinetic Art, Light Art, Contemporary Art, Postwar Ar
- Movement: Contemporary Art
- Spouse: Mirtha Delgado (m. 1951)
- Children: Carlos Cruz; Jorge Cruz; Adriana Cruz
- Parents: Carlos Eduardo Cruz Lander (mother); Mariana Díez Feo (father)
- Awards: Orden Andrés Bello; Premio Nacional de Artes Plásticas (1971); Officer of the National Order of the Legion of Honour (2012); Commander of the Order of Arts and Letters (2002)
- Website: www.cruz-diez.com

Carlos Cruz-Diez (17 August 1923 – 27 July 2019) was a Franco-Venezuelan artist recognized within the kinetic art movement. He lived and worked in Paris from 1960 until his death. Cruz-Diez proposed conceiving color as an autonomous reality that develops in time and space, without the aid of form or the need for a support. His work encompasses eight investigations: Additive Color (Couleur Additive), Physichromie, Chromatic Induction (Induction Chromatique), Chromointerférence, Transchromie, Chromosaturation, Chromoscope, and Color in Space (Couleur à l’Espace).

Cruz-Diez is one of the primary figures and most prominent representatives of kinetic art. His research has provided a new approach to the phenomenon of color in the field of art, particularly through the development of color perception.

As a color theorist, Cruz-Diez research based on three chromatic situations: subtractive, additive, and reflective which led to a new cognitive approach to the phenomenon of color, expanding its field of perception. Cruz-Diez apprehended color as an autonomous reality that evolves in space and time. His abstract works are defined by the use of color and lines to create the impression of movement and are exhibited in museums worldwide, including the Museum of Modern Art in New York, Tate Modern in London, the Centre Georges Pompidou in Paris, and the Museum of Fine Arts in Caracas.

== Biography ==
=== Early life and family ===
Carlos Eduardo Cruz-Diez was born on 17 August 1923, in La Pastora, Caracas, Venezuela. He was the son of Carlos Eduardo Cruz Lander, a chemist and poet of Canarian descent, and Mariana Diez Feo. On his mother's side, his family tree includes many prominent figures from South American post-colonial history. He was the great-grandson of General Mariano Diez, who significantly contributed to the independence of Venezuela. One of General Diez's most recognized sons (Carlos's great-uncle) was Manuel Antonio Diez, Vice President of the Republic during the mandate of Joaquín Crespo (1884-1886).

"My life project included painting and family at the same time," he wrote in his memoir Living in Art: Memories of What I Remember.

As a child, Cruz-Diez was fascinated by the red projections on his white shirt caused by sunlight passing through cola bottles in his father's plant. He studied at the Colegio Atenas and later attended high school at the Liceo Andrés Bello.

=== 1940: Training Period and Social Painting ===
Cruz-Diez began his studies at the School of Plastic and Applied Arts in Caracas in 1940, where he discovered what he called his "awakening to the euphoria of color". He received lessons from masters such as Marcos Castillo and Luis Alfredo López Méndez. He became friends with Alejandro Otero and Jesús Rafael Soto, who would later become his peers in geometric abstraction and the kinetic movement. He graduated in 1945 as a Professor of Applied Arts and Manual Arts.

At that time, he was interested in the work of Francisco Narváez and Héctor Poleo. While studying, he collaborated with humorous cartoons for the newspaper La Esfera and the children's magazine Tricolor. His painting at that time focused on social realism.

However, already in this formative period, he became aware of the importance of working with color. He learned from one of his teachers, Rafael Ramón González, not to paint the flat and evident color of objects but to interpret the nuances that compose it. Years later, he delved deeper into this precept, ultimately realizing one of his greatest discoveries: appreciating that color is in the space that surrounds us and that the key lies in knowing how to see color.

In 1944, he worked as an illustrator and graphic designer for the magazine El Farol of the Creole Petroleum Corporation and also illustrated other publications. He also created comics for various Venezuelan newspapers. A year later, upon graduating, he began working as a professor of Painting and Art History at the School of Visual Arts and Applied Arts in Caracas.

In 1946, he was appointed creative director of the advertising agency McCann-Erickson Venezuela and later, in 1953, worked as an illustrator for the newspaper El Nacional.

He held his first solo exhibition at the Venezuelan-American Institute of Caracas in 1947, and three years later, became part of the editorial board of the magazine Taller.

During this period, the artist focused his work on the representation of marginalized and precarious sectors of the city of Caracas, characterized by social inequality. A key moment of this era was Héctor Poleo's exhibition in 1947 upon his return from Mexico. Works such as Los tres comisarios (The Three Commissioners, 1943) or Paisaje de los Andes (Andean Landscape, 1941) revealed to him that social reality could be painted in a different way, without the Cezannian brushstroke, and also that it was possible to address subjects other than landscapes, nudes, or still lifes. This began a series of paintings such as Adán el chichero, Las aguadoras, and Techo, among many others that deal with social and folkloric themes.

=== 1950: Conceptual Platform ===
In the early 1950s, Cruz-Diez linked his artistic proposal to the ideal of socially committed art, denouncing social injustices. However, he soon realized that representing these problems did not offer a solution for the communities identified in his work. Ultimately, he understood that his social calling could manifest through other channels, leading him to create his own language: "art is a complex structure of communication, expression, discovery, and invention." Thus, he began to explore the perception of color.

In 1951, after leaving McCann-Erickson, he married Mirtha Delgado Lorenzo and began working as an illustrator for the Caracas newspaper El Nacional. In 1954, he became interested in abstract trends and developed a series of projects for outdoor murals using geometric elements. That same year, he presented these projects at the XV Official Salon (1954), which sparked surprise due to his shift toward abstraction.

Between 1954 and 1959, Cruz-Diez's work went through several stages of study: Signos Vegetales (Plant Signs, 1955–1956); Objetos Rítmicos Móviles (Mobile Rhythmic Objects, 1956–1957); and the Estudio de la percepción Óptica y la inestabilidad del plano (Study of Optical Perception and Plane Instability, 1956–1959). During this time, he also engaged in intense reading, research, and reflection, which led him to focus his attention and work around the chromatic phenomenon.

In 1955, he lived for a year and a half in El Masnou, Barcelona, Spain. That year, he traveled to Paris and visited the exhibition "Le Mouvement" at the Galerie Denise René, where his friend Jesús Rafael Soto was participating. This trip inspired a new direction for Carlos Cruz-Diez. The following year, he exhibited the Signos Vegetales (Plant Signs) and Objetos Rítmicos Móviles (Mobile Rhythmic Objects) series at the Galería Buchholz in Madrid. After brief trips to New York and Paris in 1957, he returned to Caracas and founded the Estudio de Artes Visuales, dedicated to graphic and industrial design. In 1959, he created his first Additive Color (Couleur Additive) and his first Physichromie.

In 1959, Cruz-Diez's Physichromie series realized the artist's premise of bringing art as an autonomous chromatic reality into the viewer's environment. The surfaces of the Physichromies are made of colored strips of cardboard, aluminum, or plexiglass assembled in two alternating levels: one flat and one raised. These chromatic schemes produce a sensation of vibratory movement that causes color tones to multiply depending on the viewer's position and distance, as well as the angle of reflected light—whether natural or artificial—from the surroundings. Cruz-Diez's series of geometric paintings called Couleur Additive involves combining two colors to create the illusion of a third.

These early works were fundamental in defining the artist's future trajectory. Cruz-Diez no longer denounced social injustices through figurative painting; instead, he deployed a new medium to express contemporaneity while maintaining his moral commitment to serving a broad audience.

=== 1960: An Unprecedented Visual Discourse ===
In 1960, Cruz-Diez decided to settle permanently in Paris with his family. The following year, he participated in the exhibition Bewogen Beweging at the Stedelijk Museum in Amsterdam, which featured collaborations from artists such as: Allan Kaprow, Alexander Calder, Moholy-Nagy, Robert Rauschenberg, Jean Tinguely, Marcel Duchamp, Victor Vasarely.

In 1964, he began producing the Induction Chromatique (Chromatic Induction) series, and between December of that year and February 1965, he participated in the exhibition Le Mouvement 2.

In 1965, he was appointed Advisor at the Noroit Cultural Center in Arras, France. That same year, he participated in The Responsive Eye at the Museum of Modern Art (MoMA) in New York, a pioneering exhibition for the kinetic art movement. Throughout this period, the artist continued to practice graphic design as a secondary activity.

In 1965, Cruz-Diez conceived his first chromatic environment, Laberinto de Descondicionamiento (Deconditioning Labyrinth). This led to the creation of Chromosaturation, an immersive work later installed in Paris in the Saint-Germain-des-Prés district for the "Art dans la rue" festival.

In 1966, he won the III American Art Biennial in Córdoba, Argentina, and in 1967, he presented Physichromie 22 at the exhibition Lumière et Mouvement at the Museum of Modern Art in Paris (May–August 1967). In 1968, on the occasion of the Cinétique exhibition held at the Maison de la Culture in Grenoble, France, he exhibited his Chromosaturations for the first time.

He was awarded the International Painting Prize at the 1967 São Paulo Biennial. He represented Venezuela at the 35th Venice Biennale in 1970, where he presented a Chromatic Induction, a Physichromie, and a chromatic environment: Chromosaturation (1965/1970). This exhibition solidified Cruz-Diez's international recognition as a leading figure in kinetic art.

Starting in 1967, Cruz-Diez executed numerous monumental works in architecture, public spaces, and habitable environments worldwide, with Venezuela housing the largest number of these creations. His first public artwork was temporary, consisting of 20 colored Plexiglas cubicles installed along the pedestrian Boulevard Saint-Germain in Paris for a street festival in 1969. The commission for the Caracas airport was followed by dozens more, including: a sculpture for the plaza in front of the Venezuelan embassy in Paris, interventions at the UBS headquarters in Zurich (1975), a hydroelectric plant in Venezuela (1977), a sculpture marking the border between Andorra and Spain (1991), the decoration of the walkways leading to the Marlins baseball stadium in Miami (2011).

=== 1970: The cycle of monumental works ===
The 1970s saw the consolidation of Cruz-Diez's monumental works. He always emphasized that the significance of the Muros Exteriores (Exterior Walls) series lay in its social dimension rather than its purely aesthetic value. These were participatory works through which the artist intended to share the pleasure of his research and chromatic studies with the general public.

By 1970, the artist's research had reached an advanced stage, as reflected in the 29 monumental pieces he created during this period. Notable works include: Ambientación Cromática, José Antonio Páez Hydroelectric Plant, Santo Domingo, Venezuela (1973), Ambientación Color Aditivo, floor of the Simón Bolívar International Airport, Maiquetía, Venezuela (1974), Environnement Chromo-cinétique, Union Bank of Switzerland (UBS) headquarters, Zurich, Switzerland (1975), Cilindros de Inducción Cromática, Port of La Guaira, Venezuela (1975), Physichromie Doble Faz, Plaza Venezuela, Paris, France (1976), Ambientación Cromática, Simón Bolívar Hydroelectric Plant (Guri Dam), Bolívar state, Venezuela (1977), Ambientación Cromática, Venezuelan Navigation Company (CAVN), Caracas, Venezuela (1979).

From 1972 to 1973, Cruz-Diez served as a professor at the École Supérieure des Beaux-Arts et des Techniques Cinétiques in Paris.

=== 1980s: The Development of a Didactic Discourse ===
During the 1980s, Carlos Cruz-Diez began to crystallize the reflections he had been developing since the 1950s. He focused on structuring his body of work and dedicated himself to writing more methodically than before, embarking on the drafting of his book Reflection on Color (Reflexión sobre el color).

This decade marked a period in which he sought to explain his work to the world, even as his research continued to evolve. In 1980, the traveling exhibition Didactics and Dialectics of Color (Didáctica y Dialéctica del Color), presented at the Art Museum of the Simón Bolívar University in Caracas, illustrated this didactic approach.

In 1988, the exhibition Die Autonomie der Farbe: Bilder – Plastiken – Objekte aus den Jahren 1959-1988 at the Josef Albers Museum Quadrat Bottrop in Germany represented a major milestone for him. It positioned his work in a line of continuity with the legacy of Josef Albers.

In 1989, the first Spanish edition of the book Reflexión sobre el color was published by Fabriart Editions in Venezuela.

=== 1990s: Digital Technology ===
In 1995, Cruz-Diez continued his research, and his experiments with irradiated color culminated in the work Couleur à l’espace (Color in Space). He also began exploring computer science with his work Experiencia Cromática Aleatoria Interactiva (Interactive Random Chromatic Experience, 1995). This software allows users to create compositions of forms and color harmonies, entering the artist's creative spirit through his own tools, much like a musician performs a composer's work using a written score.

During this decade, he also completed 25 monumental works, including:

- Inducción Cromática por Cambio de Frecuencia doble faz, Plaza Alonso Gamero, University of the Andes, Mérida, Venezuela (1991).
- Fisicromía doble faz para Madrid, Juan Carlos I Park, Madrid, Spain (1991).
- Fisicromía Boricua, Botanical Garden, University of Puerto Rico, San Juan, Puerto Rico (1992).
- Ambientación Cromática, Virtual Reality Plaza, Venezuelan Pavilion, "Seville Expo '92", Seville, Spain (1992).
- Induction Chromatique par changement de fréquence, Ravensburger publishing headquarters, Ravensburg, Germany (1994).
- Cilindros de Inducción Cromática por cambio de Frecuencia, Molinos Dominicanos Silos, Port of Santo Domingo, Dominican Republic (1994).
- Inducción Cromática Ecuatoriana, Metropolitan Park, Quito, Ecuador (1997).
- Physichromie 1349.

=== 2000s: Recognition ===
During the first decade of the 2000s, Cruz-Diez created numerous monumental works, held exhibitions in major museums and galleries, and was a frequent keynote speaker at international events and conferences. During this time, he refined his discourse to make his research more accessible, leading to the 2009 reissue of his book Reflection on Color (Reflexión sobre el color) by the Juan March Foundation in Spain.

In 2005, his family established the Atelier Cruz-Diez and the Cruz-Diez Foundation, both dedicated to the preservation, dissemination, and promotion of the artist's conceptual and artistic legacy.

In 2007, he created Pyramide Chromointerférente, a work consisting of a three-dimensional pyramid upon which a fixed additive color pattern and a mobile pattern are projected, generating visual interference.

=== 2010s: The Master ===
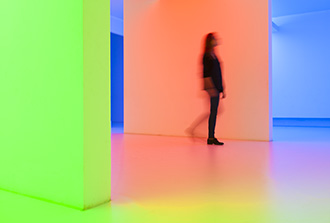
Cruz-Diez 2013 Grand Palais Paris France

In this decade, the artist's celebrated chromatic environments had a significant impact in Houston. His Chromosaturation was one of the standout pieces in a major retrospective, Color in Space and Time, at the Museum of Fine Arts, Houston (MFAH) in 2011. Later, in 2018, his Spatial Chromatic Interference transformed the Buffalo Bayou Cistern. Most recently, the MFAH commissioned a Chromosaturation for the underground tunnel leading to the new Nancy and Rich Kinder Building, which has become a highlight for visitors.

"The Master" is recognized as a color theorist whose contributions changed the perception of color in art.

In 2008, two years before the 50th anniversary of his arrival in Paris, Cruz-Diez obtained French citizenship. In 2009, his family established the Articruz workshop in Panama. In 2011, he inaugurated his retrospective exhibition, Carlos Cruz-Diez: Color in Space and Time, at the MFAH in the United States. This exhibition also traveled to the Pinacoteca de São Paulo in Brazil (2011), the Museum of Latin American Art of Buenos Aires (MALBA) in Argentina (2012), and the University Museum of Contemporary Art (MUAC) in Mexico (2013).

In 2012, he was awarded the rank of Officer of the National Order of the Legion of Honour in France. In 2013, he was one of the most prominent figures in the exhibition Dynamo: A Century of Light and Movement in Art, 1913–2013 at the Galeries Nationales du Grand Palais in Paris.

In 2014, the artist created a Chromatic Environment for the exhibition Cruz-Diez: Spatial Color at the Niemeyer Center in Spain. He also collaborated with other artists, such as Liu Bolin (China) in 2016. That same year, he published his memoirs, Recuerdos de lo que me acuerdo (Memories of What I Remember), and participated in the exhibition Eye Attack: Op Art and Kinetic Art 1950–1970 at the Louisiana Museum of Modern Art in Denmark. In the exhibition Lumière, Lumières, Cruz-Diez posthumously represented France at the Dubai World Expo (2021).

His work is part of the permanent collections of prestigious museums, including: Museum of Modern Art (MoMA), New York; Tate Modern, London; Centre Georges Pompidou, Paris; Museum of Fine Arts, Houston; Musée d’Art Contemporain de Montréal, Canada; Wallraf-Richartz Museum, Cologne; Museum of Contemporary Art Australia, Sydney; Satoru Sato Art Museum, Tome, Japan; Musée d’Art Moderne de la Ville de Paris, France.

=== The Carlos Cruz-Diez Museum, the Atelier Cruz-Diez, and the Cruz-Diez Foundation ===
In 1996, construction began on the Carlos Cruz-Diez Museum of Print and Design (Museo de la Estampa y el Diseño Carlos Cruz-Diez), which was inaugurated in 1997. That same year, the artist was appointed President of the museum and a member of the Superior Council of the Carlos Cruz-Diez Museum of Print and Design Foundation. The institution's primary objective is to study, disseminate, collect, and preserve the work of Venezuelan and international designers and graphic artists related to printmaking and design. In 2005, his family established the Cruz-Diez Foundation, a non-profit organization based in Houston, dedicated to the promotion, conservation, development, and dissemination of his artistic and conceptual legacy. That same year, the Atelier Cruz-Diez was created to manage, promote, and preserve the artist's body of work.

=== Last years and death ===
Cruz-Diez died of natural causes on 27 July 2019, in Paris. His family continues to maintain his legacy, honoring the artist's own wishes and vision for his body of work.

=== Birth Centenary (August 2023) ===
To commemorate the 100th anniversary of Cruz-Diez's birth, several international events were organized. A standout was the exhibition RGB: The Colors of the Century, a traveling didactic show conceived and curated by the artist in 2014. Based on his research into additive and inductive color, it was exhibited at: Fondation Vasarely, France; Shanghai Rainbow Space, China; Hangaram Art Museum, Seoul, South Korea; Carlos Cruz-Diez Museum of Print and Design, Caracas, Venezuela. Additionally, the retrospective exhibition Color in Two Times (El color en dos tiempos) was presented at the National Art Gallery in Caracas.

== Exhibitions ==
- 1961: Bewogen Beweging (Eng: “Moving Movement”), Stedelijk Museum, Amsterdam, Netherlands
- 1964: Mouvement 2, Galerie Denise René, Paris, France
- 1965: The Responsive Eye, Museum of Modern Art (MoMA), New York, USA
- 1970: Pabellón de Venezuela, XXXV Venice Biennale, Venice, Italy
- 1988: Carlos Cruz-Diez: Die Autonomie der Farbe, Josef Albers Museum, Bottrop, Germany
- 2003: Une Tour Eiffel haute en couleurs (Eng: “A colorful Eiffel Tower”), Centre Georges Pompidou, Paris, France
- 2004: Inverted Utopias: Avant-garde Art in Latin America, Museum of Fine Arts, Houston, USA
- 2007: Lo(s) Cinético(s), Museo Nacional Centro de Arte Reina Sofía, Madrid, Spain
- 2008: Carlos Cruz-Diez: (In)formed by Color, Americas Society, New York, USA
- 2009: Carlos Cruz-Diez: El color sucede, Museu d’Art Espanyol Contemporani, Palma de Mallorca, Spain
- 2010: Carlos Cruz-Diez: The Embodied Experience of Color, Miami Art Museum (PAMM), USA
- 2010: Environment Chromatic-Interferences: Interactive Space, Guangdong Museum of Art, Guangzhou, China
- 2011: Carlos Cruz-Diez: Color in Space and Time, Museum of Fine Arts, Houston, USA
- 2012: Carlos Cruz-Diez: A cor no espaço e no tempo, Pinacoteca do Estado, São Paulo, Brazil
- 2012: Carlos Cruz-Diez: El color en el espacio y en el tiempo (Eng: “Color in Space and Time”), University Museum of Contemporary Art - MUAC, Mexico City, Mexico
- 2013: Light Show, Hayward Gallery, London, UK
- 2013: La Invención Concreta: Colección Patricia Phelps de Cisneros (Eng: “The Concrete Invention: Patricia Phelps de Cisneros Collection”), Reina Sofía National Art Centre Museum, Madrid, Spain
- 2013: Dynamo: Un siècle de lumière et de mouvement dans l’art. (Eng: “A Century of Light and Movement in Art”), 1913–2013, Galeries Nationales du Grand Palais, Paris, France
- 2014: Carlos Cruz-Diez in Black & White, Americas Society, New York, USA
- 2014: Carlos Cruz-Diez: Evolving Color at Louis Stern Fine Arts, West Hollywood, CA
- 2014: La Couleur et le corps (Eng: “Color and the Body”), Denise René Gallery, Paris, France
- 2015: Carlos Cruz-Diez: Didaktik und Dialektik der Farbe (Eng: “Didactics and Dialectic of Color”), Das Kleine Museum, Weißenstadt, Germany
- 2016: Carlos Cruz-Diez. Du statique au dynamique (Eng: “From static to dynamic”), Galerie Denise René - Espace Marais, Paris, France
- 2016: Carlos Cruz-Diez. Un être flottant (Eng: “A Floating Being”), Mitterrand Gallery, Paris, France
- 2017: Carlos Cruz-Diez. Mastering Colour, Puerta Roja, Hong Kong, China
- 2017: Chroma, SCAD Museum of Art, Savannah, USA
- 2018: Carlos Cruz-Diez at the Cistern: Spatial Chromointerference, Buffalo Bayou Park Cistern, Houston, USA
- 2018: Carlos Cruz-Diez. Luminous Reality, Phillips, London, United Kingdom
- 2018: Carlos Cruz-Diez. Color in Motion, Museum für Konkrete Kunst Ingolstadt (MKKI), Ingolstadt, Germany
- 2018: L'aventure de la couleur, Centre Pompidou-Metz, France
- 2019: Cruz-Diez: Labyrinthus, La Patinoire Royale (Eng: “Labyrinthus, The Royal Ice Rink”) | Galerie Valérie Bach, Brussels, Belgium
- 2021: Frieze Sculpture, Regent's Park, Londres, Reino Unido
- 2022: Carlos Cruz-Diez, Circular Transchromy Environment (Eng: “Circular Transchromy Environment”), Venet Foundation, Le Muy, France
- 2022: Carlos Cruz-Diez, El Peso de la Forma (Eng: “The Weight of Form”), graphic design by Carlos Cruz-Diez, Sala Mendoza, Caracas, Venezuela
- 2022: Carlos Cruz-Diez: Chromosaturation, Pérez Art Museum Miami (PAMM), USA
- 2022: The Euphoria of Color, Galleria Continua, Dubai, United Arab Emirates
- 2023: Carlos Cruz-Diez: El Color en movimiento (Eng: “Color in Motion”), Centre Pompidou, Málaga, Spain
- 2023: El color en 2 tiempos (Eng: “Color in Two Acts”), National Art Gallery, Caracas, Venezuela
- 2023: RGB. Los Colores del Siglo (Eng: “The Colors of the Century”). Carlos Cruz-Diez Museum of Printmaking and Design, Caracas, Venezuela. Rainbow Space, Shanghai, China. Hangaram Art Museum, Seoul, Korea. Amazon Biennial Cultural Center, Belém, Brazil. Costa Rican Art Museum (MAC), Belém, Brazil.
- 2024: Electric Dreams, Tate Modern, London, UK
- 2025: Color Everywhere, Museum Josef Albers Quadrat, Bottrop, Germany

== Works ==
=== Reflexión sobre el Color: Perspectives on the Artistic Vision of Cruz-Diez ===
Published in 1989, Cruz-Diez's book Reflexión sobre el Color (Reflection on Color) summarized his concept of color as a dynamic and autonomous phenomenon that evolves with light and movement, challenging traditional views of color as a static element.

Beyond detailing his artistic practices, the book delves into theoretical aspects, positioning Cruz-Diez's work within broader academic discussions on color theory and perception.

Cruz-Diez Plaza at the "La Hechicera" University Complex (ULA), Mérida, Venezuela:

"In the last 50 years, I have insisted on bringing color into space, without support and without anecdote, revealing it in its ambiguity as an ephemeral circumstance, in continuous mutation, creating autonomous realities." — Carlos Cruz-Diez

The majority of his reflections originate from what he termed "supports for chromatic events." His body of work demonstrates that color, when interacting with the observer, becomes an autonomous event capable of evolving in real time and space, free from narrative (anecdote) and without the aid of traditional form or physical support.

"Through my chromatic trajectory, I attempt to demonstrate color as an ephemeral situation, as an autonomous reality in continuous mutation. It is a reality because the events take place in real space and time—without past or future, in a perpetual present. It is autonomous because its manifestation does not depend on form or narrative, nor even on the support." — Carlos Cruz-Diez

=== Investigaciones ===
Cruz-Diez centered his research on the dissociation of the form-color binomial, aiming to liberate color from form. Starting from the fragmentation of the plane, he used "chromatic event modules" which is a series of lines in a rigorous, programmed order aimed to demonstrate his theoretical postulates regarding color.

"Color is an autonomous fact that exists without the need for form." — Carlos Cruz-Diez

Consequently, the diamonds and other shapes appearing in his works are not conventional in the traditional sense; they are the result of the accumulation of modules that, through superposition and repetition, generate virtual forms such as squares, triangles, and rectangles.

Having established his conceptual platform in Caracas in 1959, Cruz-Diez moved to Paris in 1960 to develop and structure the various supports that would allow him to materialize his visual discourse. Between 1959 and 1995, he developed eight specific investigations that demonstrate different behaviors of color:

- Couleur Additive (Additive Color), 1959
- Physichromie (Physichromie), 1959
- Induction Chromatique (Chromatic Induction), 1963
- Chromointerférence (Chromo-interference), 1964
- Transchromie (Transchromie), 1965
- Chromosaturation (Chromosaturation), 1965
- Chromoscope (Chromoscope), 1967
- Couleur à l’espace (Color in Space), 1993

== Techniques and Technologies ==
Throughout his life, Cruz-Diez collaborated with specialized teams of engineers, technicians, and artisans. A cornerstone of his artistic process was the engineering of custom machinery specifically designed to bring his vision of dynamic and interactive color to life.

His career was marked by a commitment to continuous improvement, characterized by frequent experimentation with new tools, materials, and emerging technologies. This innovative spirit extended beyond the initial creation of his works; his team played a vital role in the ongoing maintenance and technical adaptation of his installations, ensuring that his immersive color environments remained fully experiential for the public.

Cruz-Diez's workshops served as a training ground for several assistants who later became significant figures in contemporary art: Ariel Jiménez, Manuel Mérida, Carlos Torresy Franz Späth.

=== Integration into Urban Space and Architecture ===
Cruz-Diez's interest in public spaces began in 1954 with his Proyectos Murales Manipulables (Manipulable Mural Projects). Since then, he has become a master of integrating art into architecture, with works spanning North America, South America, Europe, and Asia.

His works integrated into public spaces and architecture serve to create a dynamic conception of space. This approach expands the artwork's field of action to include any architectural or urban element: a floor, a ceiling, a door, a bus, or a wall can be transformed into a perceptual event. These installations create situations that involve anyone walking nearby, regardless of whether they intended to interact with the piece.

"The works I create in the urban environment and habitat are conceived as a visual discourse generated in time and space, creating chromatic situations and events that change the dialectic between the viewer and the work. Unlike artists of the Middle Ages, the Renaissance, or the Mexican muralists, my works do not contain referential discourses. They constitute the support for an event that evolves in real time and space, changing with the shifting light and the distance of the spectator. They are autonomous situations devoid of anecdotes, in which the viewer discovers color making and unmaking itself—without past or future, in a perpetual present." — Carlos Cruz-Diez, Paris, 1996

=== Collaborations ===
Carlos Cruz-Diez brought his innovative concepts to fashion and design through a number of collaborations, reflecting his commitment to integrating art into everyday life and making his theories of dynamic color accessible in new ways.

The artist also created works for jewelry, including bracelets, earrings, and necklaces.

In 2014, Cruz-Diez collaborated with fashion designer Oscar Carvallo, who created a collection of 35 silhouettes based on six of the artist's works. The garments incorporated forms, textures, prints, and details inspired by Cruz-Diez's exploration of color and movement.

In 2015, he partnered with Hublot to create the limited-edition Hublot Classic Fusion Cruz-Diez, a watch that incorporated his artistic vision into contemporary watchmaking by emphasizing the interaction of color, light, and movement.

Cruz-Diez also collaborated with brands by integrating monumental artworks into commercial spaces. In 2018, his installation Transchromie Mécanique Aléatoire (2010) was inaugurated at the Longchamp flagship store on Fifth Avenue in New York City.

These days, fashion has become very important in the renewing of ideas, of new possibilities, and even new materials.

— Carlos Cruz-Diez, 2014

Throughout his career, Cruz-Diez collaborated with fashion and jewelry designers and luxury brands including Hublot, Oscar Carvallo, Chus Burés, and Elisabetta Cipriani.

== Awards ==
Year	Award / Honor	Institution / Event	Location
1966	Grand Prize	III American Art Biennial, National University of Córdoba	Córdoba, Argentina
1967	International Painting Prize	IX São Paulo Biennial	São Paulo, Brazil
1969	Second Prize	International Painting Festival, Château-Musée	Cagnes-sur-Mer, France
1971	National Prize for Plastic Arts	National Institute of Culture and Fine Arts (INCIBA)	Caracas, Venezuela
1976	Arts Integration Prize	VI Architecture Biennial, College of Architects of Venezuela	Caracas, Venezuela
1981	Order of Andrés Bello (First Class)	Government of Venezuela	Caracas, Venezuela
2002	Commander of the Order of Arts and Letters	Ministry of Culture	Paris, France
2006	Honorary Doctorate	Simón Bolívar University	Caracas, Venezuela
2007	Honorary Doctorate in Art	University of the Andes (ULA)	Mérida, Venezuela
2008	Medal of Honor of the City of Marcigny	City Council	Marcigny, France
2010	AICA 2009 Prize	International Association of Art Critics	Caracas, Venezuela
2011	Gold Medal of the Americas Society	Americas Society (31st Annual Spring Party)	New York, USA
2011	Best Living Artist Award	Estampa 2011 Fair	Madrid, Spain
2012	National Order of the Legion of Honour (Officer)	Government of France	Paris, France
2012	Paez Medal of Art	The Venezuelan American Endowment for the Arts (VAEA)	New York, USA
2012	Penagos Drawing Prize	MAPFRE Foundation	Madrid, Spain
2015	Turner Medal	City University London	London, UK
2016	The International Trebbia Award	Trebbia Foundation	Prague, Czech Republic
2017	SCAD deFINE ART Award	Savannah College of Art and Design (SCAD)	Savannah, USA
2018	Human Rights Friendly Personality	International Solidarity for Human Rights	Miami, USA
2019	Posthumous Honorary Doctorate	Central University of Venezuela (UCV)	Caracas, Venezuela
2023	Posthumous Honorary Doctorate	Metropolitan University (UNIMET)	Caracas, Venezuela

== See also ==
- Free Color
