= Bodegas Pomar, C.A. =

- Company type: Private company
- Industry: Alcoholic drinks
- Founded: 1985
- Headquarters: Carora, Lara, Venezuela
- Products: Still wine and sparkling wine
- Revenue: ▲$ ? billion (2006) ▲ Bs. ? billion (2006)
- Net income: ▼$ ? billion (2006) ▼ Bs. ? billion (2006)
- Number of employees: ??? (2006)
- Parent: Empresas Polar, C.A.

Bodegas Pomar is an Empresas Polar subsidiary that makes still and sparkling wine. The company also set a joint venture with the French cognac manufacturer Martell and its headquarters are located in Carora, Lara, Venezuela. Their vineyards are located in Altagracia, Lara and enclose 80 hectares.
