= Grupo GEPP =

Mexican beverage company

Grupo GEPP, S.A.P.I. de C.V.
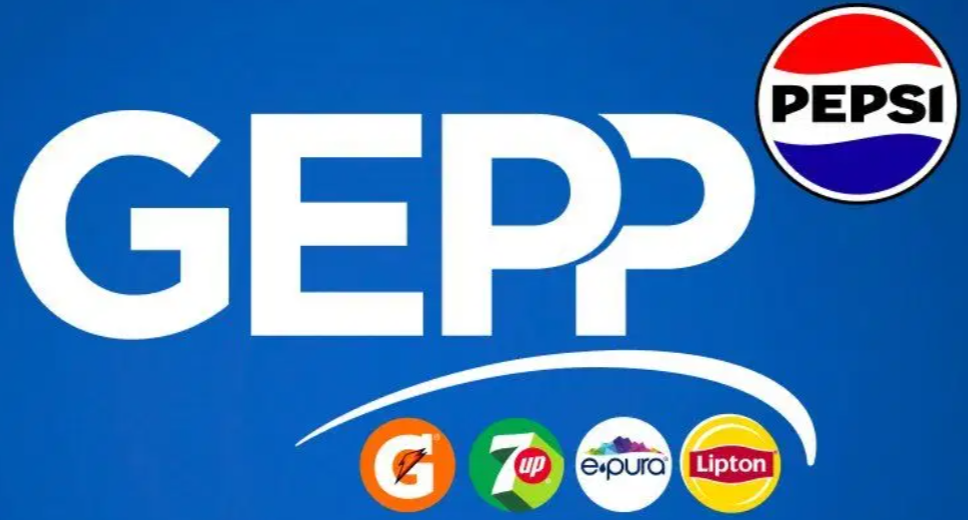
- Company type: Public company
- Industry: Beverage
- Founded: 1987; 39 years ago (as GEUSA); 2011; 15 years ago (as GEPP)
- Headquarters: Cuajimalpa, Mexico City, Mexico
- Area served: Mexico
- Key people: Miguel Antonio Antor Bravato (CEO); David Martin Saez Matos (CFO)
- Owner: Organización Cultiba (40%); Polmex Holdings (40%); PepsiCo México (20%)
- Website: www.gepp.com.mx

Grupo GEPP, S.A.P.I. de C.V. or known simply as GEPP (Grupo Embotelladora PepsiCo), is a Mexican beverage company based in Mexico City, Mexico. It was founded in 2011 as a merger of assets between the Mexican company Organización Cultiba, the Venezuelan company Empresas Polar, and the American multinational company PepsiCo to consolidate the operations of its brands in Mexico. The company bottles Pepsi in Mexico along with 13 other brands and as the second largest bottler in Mexico, behind Coca-Cola FEMSA but surpassing Arca Continental (AC).

== History ==
=== GEUSA (1989–2011) ===
GEUSA was founded in 1987 by the merger of Inmobiliaria Trieme, S.A. (founded on April 19, 1978) and Industrias Asasp, S.A. de C.V., the merged company was renamed Grupo Embotelladoras Unidas, S.A. (or GEUSA for short). The company was consolidated in 1989 as PepsiCo's main bottling company in Mexico.

In 1992, the agreement signed with PepsiCo included the operation of several bottling plants in Jalisco, Michoacán, Guanajuato, Colima, and Nayarit, and the introduction of the Santorini drinking water brand in 1998. In 2003, the company acquired two smaller bottlers, Bret and GESSA, which rose from 18.3% in 2003 to 36.3% in participation in 2006 within the Pepsi system in Mexico, between 2005 and 2006, Puebla, Tlaxcala, Veracruz, Tabasco, Oaxaca and Chiapas were incorporated, which increased GEUSA's market share to 48.9%. By 2008, GEUSA had around 2,240 routes throughout Mexico.

=== GEPP (2011–present) ===
An agreement was reached in 2011 with the Organización GEUSA (renamed "Cultiba" in 2012), the owner of GEUSA, and the Venezuelan company Empresas Polar, to merge the three companies, The Pepsi Bottling Group México, Gatorade México, and GEUSA, to form the new entity called GEPP (Grupo Embotelladoras PepsiCo). GEPP would produce and distribute the brands Pepsi, Gatorade, 7 Up, Lipton, Mirinda, Squirt, Santorini, Electropura, e-Pura and Be Light. The merger took place that same year and formed the second largest bottler in Mexico.

In 2012, GEPP reached its first agreement with another company, Grupo Jumex, to create the Jumex Fresh beverage, which would be produced and sold under the GEPP brand and with permits from Jumex.

On April 4, 2017, Polmex Holdings acquired 11% of GEPP's shares to Controladora de Negocios Geusa, subsidiary of Cultiba, increased its stake to 40%.

In 2018, the returnable glass bottle was launched. On June 11, 2018, the closure of GEPP's operations and plant in the Mexican city of Ciudad Altamirano, Guerrero, was announced due to a 19% increase in homicides. On December 27, 2018, an agreement was signed for the acquisition of plastics manufacturing machinery to the Italian plastics machinery company AMUT for the production of flexible packaging and will produce shrink films to wrap grouped beverages in their different brands, with a net width of 2,400 mm and a capacity of 800 kg/hr at 50 μ thickness.

On December 20, 2019, an agreement was discussed with the Mexican dairy company Alpura for the distribution of Alpura brand milk and products, which was confirmed on February 20, 2020.

On April 7, 2022, a partnership was announced with the American multinational company Honeywell.

== Products ==
- Pepsi
  - Pepsi Black
- e-Pura
- Be Light
- 7 Up
- Garci Crespo
- Jarritos (in collaboration with Consorcio Aga)
- Lipton
- Mirinda
- Manzanita Sol
- Jumex Fresh (in collaboration with Jumex)
  - Jumex Frutzzo
- Alpura Clásica (in collaboration with Alpura)
- Squirt
- Gatorade

== See also ==
- Coca-Cola FEMSA, Coca-Cola's largest bottler in Mexico and Latin America, a competitor of Grupo GEPP.
