= Sweet corn arepa =

Sweet corn cake

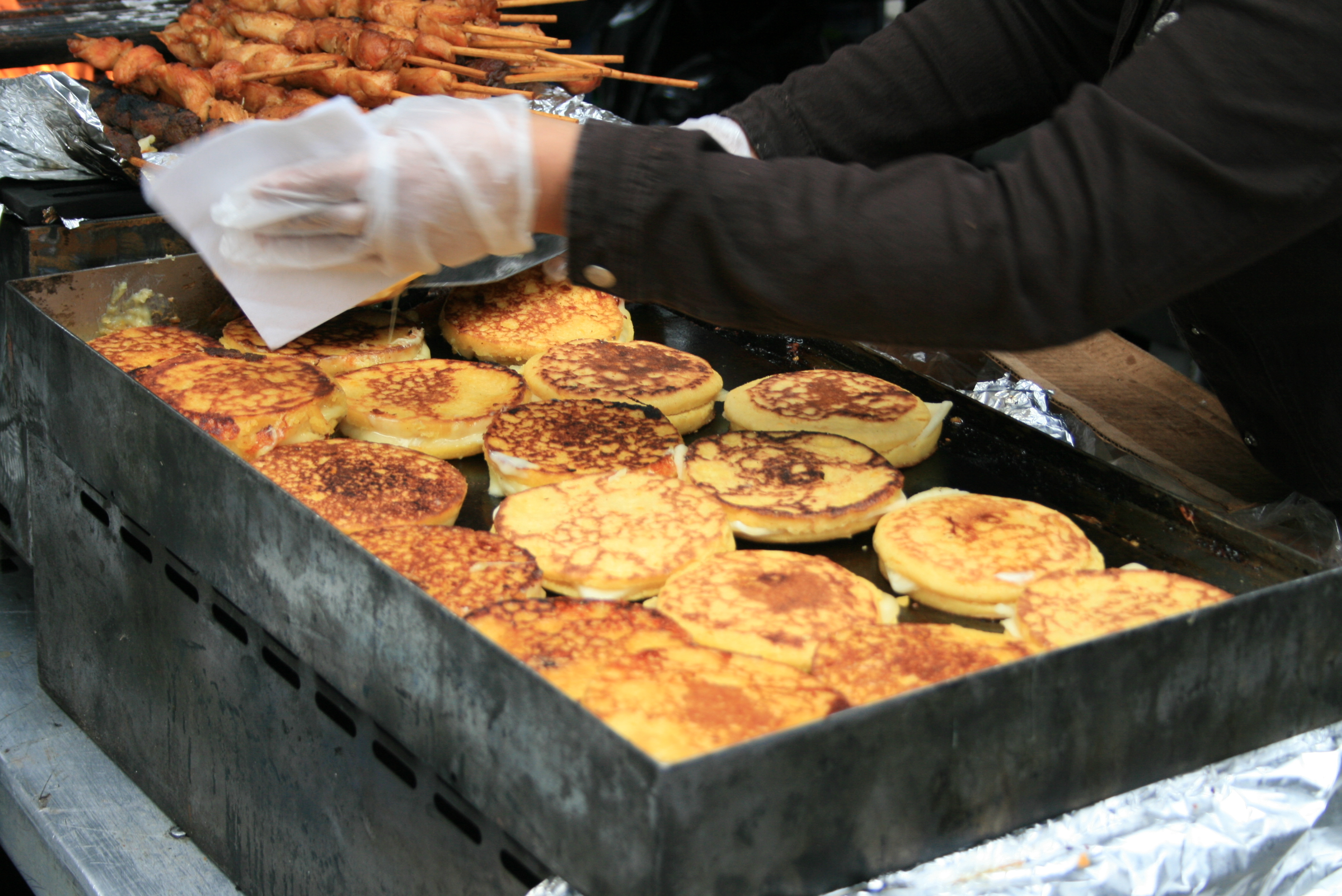
- Alternative names: Arepa de choclo, arepa de chócolo
- Associated cuisine: Colombian cuisine
- Main ingredients: Sweet corn flour
- Similar dishes: Cachapa

Sweet corn arepa (Spanish: arepa de choclo or arepa de chócolo) is a common variation of arepa made with sweet corn instead of the typical white corn. It is common in Colombian cuisine and can be topped or filled with cheese.

This type of griddlecake is known as a cachapa in Venezuela and a chorreada in Costa Rica. In Mexico, sweet corn cakes are known as toquera or toquete depending on the state.

The sweet corn arepa may have originated in the Cauca Valley in Colombia.

== Colombia ==
The sweet corn arepa is typical of the Andean Region, encompassing the departments of Antioquia, Boyacá, Cauca, Cundinamarca, Huila, Nariño, Norte de Santander, Putumayo, Santander, and Tolima.

== See also ==
- Cachapa
