= Free Color =

2020 Venezuelan documentary film

- Film poster
- Directed by: Alberto Arvelo Mendoza
- Written by: Leonardo Henríquez
- Produced by: Karibanna Content; Hapax Productions; TRES Cinematografía
- Cinematography: John Márquez
- Music by: Sebastián Arvelo; Devendra Banhart; Gustavo Dudamel; Nascuy Linares; Alvaro Paiva Bimbo
- Release date: 2020
- Running time: 67 minutes
- Countries: Venezuela; United States; France

Free Color is a 2020 documentary film by Venezuelan film maker Alberto Arvelo Mendoza. The documentary focuses on Carlos Cruz-Diez, a prominent Venezuelan kinetic artist, and how at 94 years old he has set himself the new challenge of liberating color from form. Free Color received the Best Editing Award in the SCAD Savannah Film Festival, and it was nominated both for the Ibero-American Award at the Palm Springs International Film Festival as well as the Knight Documentary Achievement Award at the Miami Film Festival.
