= Empresas Polar =

Venezuelan food company

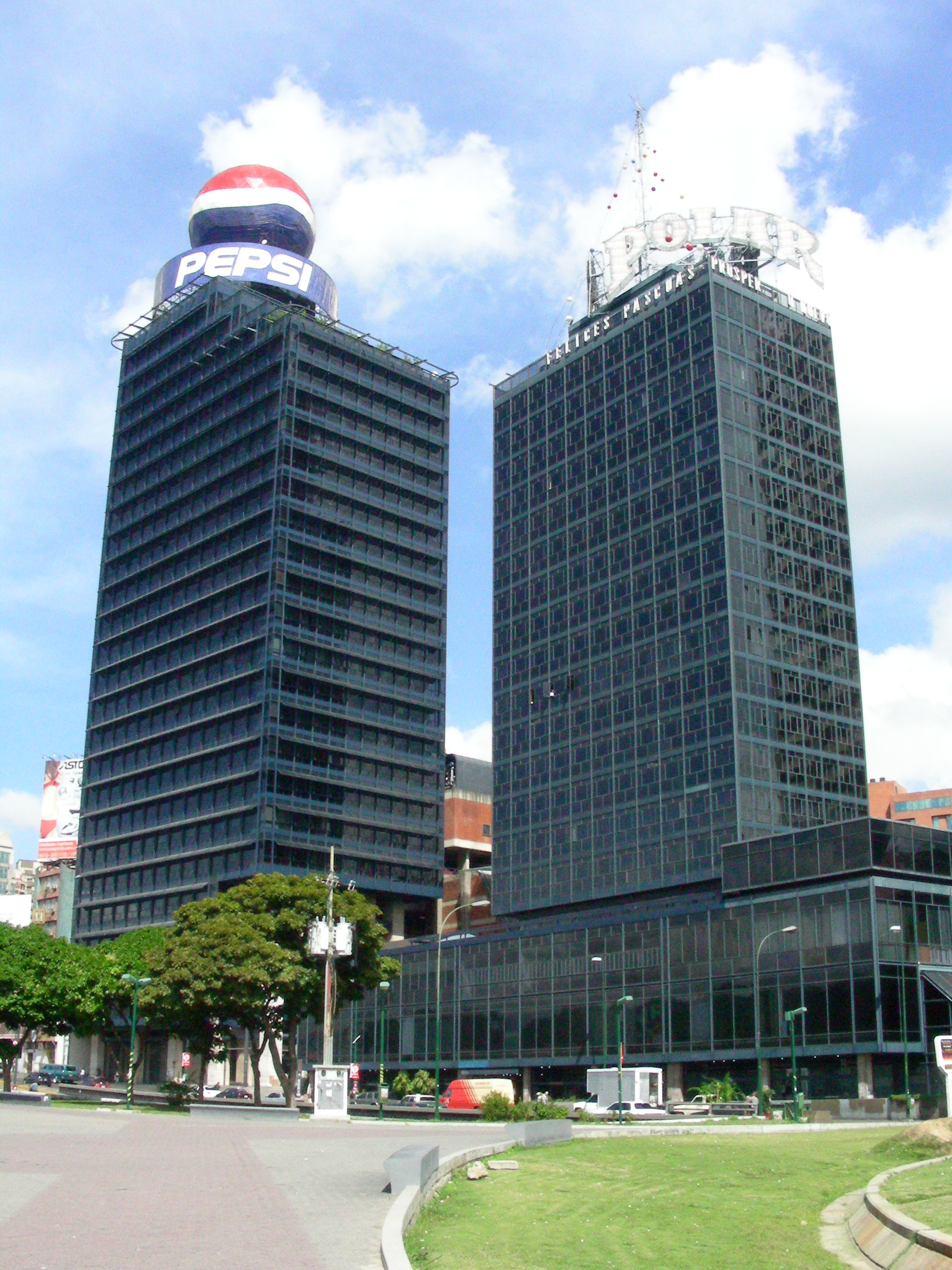
- Polar Towers, Headquarters (2007)
- Type: Private
- Industry: Conglomerates
- Founded: 1941
- Headquarters: Caracas, Distrito Capital, Venezuela
- Key people: Lorenzo Mendoza, President
- Products: Beer
- Subsidiaries: Alimentos Polar; Cervecería Polar; Pepsi Cola Venezuela
- Website: Empresas Polar

Empresas Polar is a Venezuelan corporation that started as a brewery, also referred to as La Polar, founded in 1941 by Lorenzo Alejandro Mendoza Fleury, Juan Simon Mendoza, Rafael Lujan and Karl Eggers in Antímano "La Planta de Antimano", Caracas. It is the largest and best known brewery in Venezuela, but has since long diversified to an array of industries, mostly related to food processing and packaging, also covering markets abroad.

Former Empresas Polar's logo until March 2010

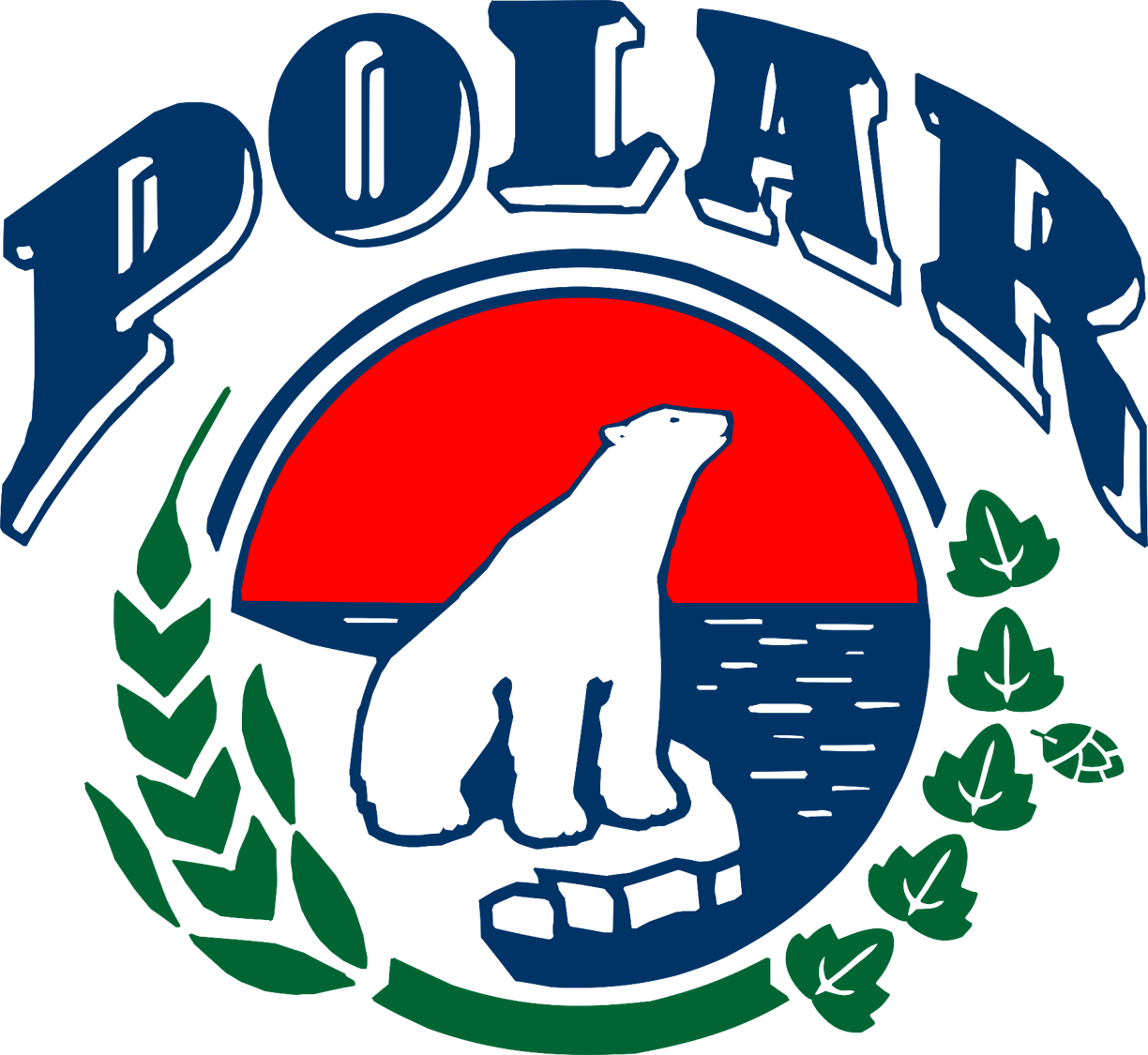
Former logo of Cervecería Polar from 1945.

== History ==
=== Beginnings (1939–1950) ===
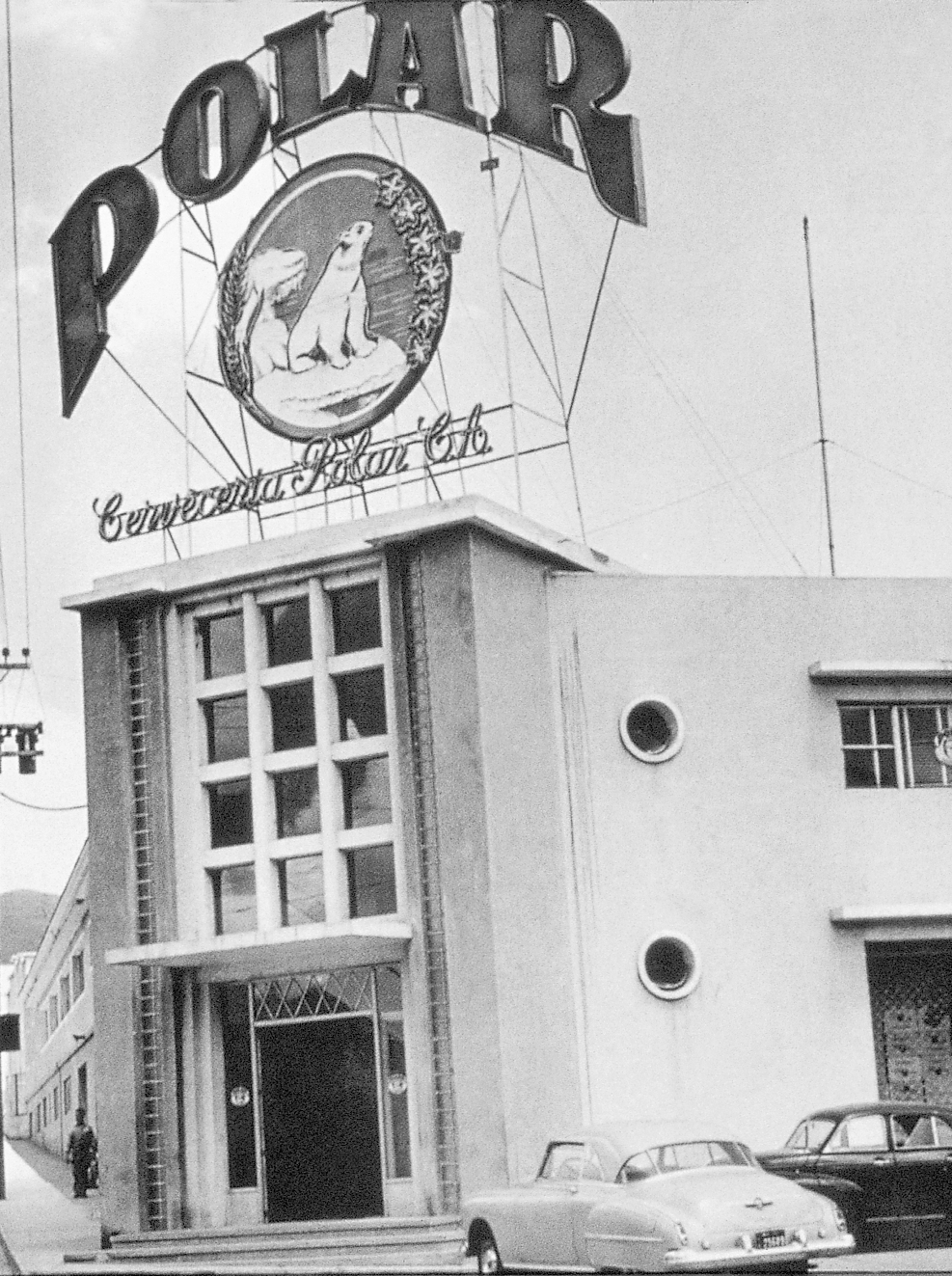
Facade of Cervecería Polar Antímano Plant.

After the end of the dictatorship of General Juan Vicente Gómez in 1935, young Caracas lawyer Lorenzo Alejandro Mendoza Fleury became the main partner of the family business "Mendoza y Compañía", which initially manufactured candles and soap. Four years later, Mendoza Fleury had the idea of establishing a brewing company together with Rafael Lujan and Karl Eggers. The project entailed great risks, but it began to take shape when the ship carrying the first brewing kettle from Europe successfully crossed the ocean and finally arrived in Venezuela on Christmas 1939. On March 14, 1941, operations began at the new company called Cervecería Polar, with entirely Venezuelan capital, in the small plant located in Antímano, west of Caracas.

The initiative was just beginning when in 1943, Carlos Roubicek (1916–2004), a young Jewish Czechoslovak brewmaster, joined the company after emigrating to Ecuador following the military occupation of his country by Nazi Germany. Four months after joining, Roubicek raised the need to change the formula of the beer produced at the plant, based on the public’s taste at the time, which, along with the right advertising, quickly made it a popular product.

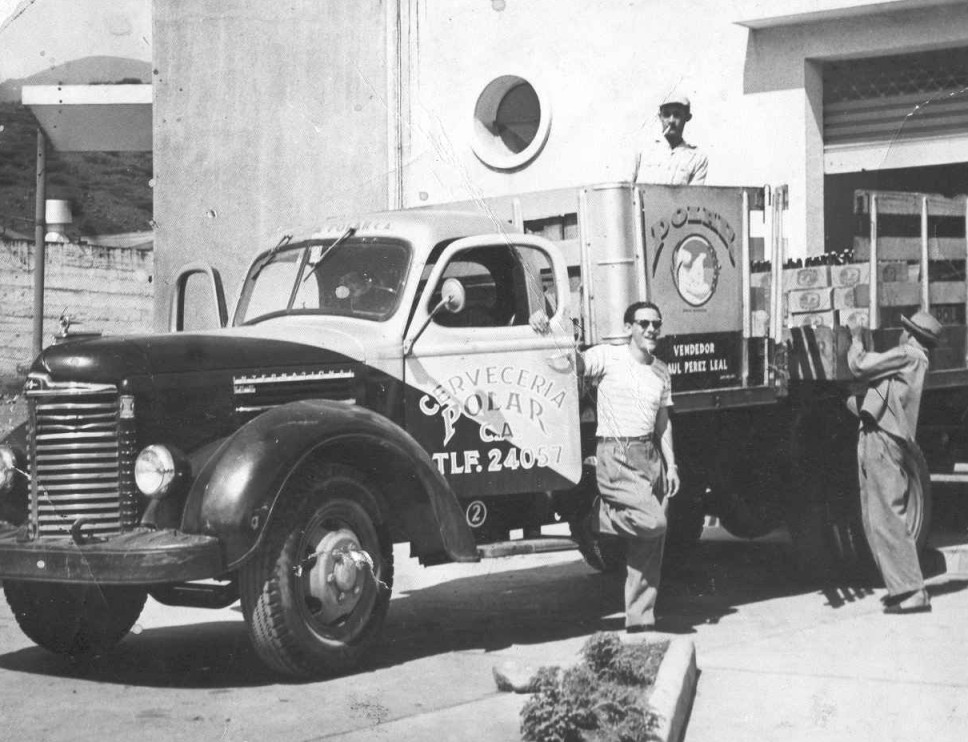
Early distribution of Polar.

At that time, the company produced about 30,000 liters of beer per month and had 50 workers, facing competition from 14 other brands, which it overcame through product quality and a human sales team. In 1948, under the supervision of Juan Lorenzo Mendoza Quintero, son of Mendoza Fleury, the first distribution company of Cervecería Polar products was established.

=== Growth (1950–1999) ===
In 1950, a second brewery began operations in Barcelona, Anzoátegui, in eastern Venezuela; the following year another plant was added in Los Cortijos, Caracas, complementing the production of the Antímano plant. In 1960, another brewery was established in Maracaibo to serve western Venezuela.

By then, with three breweries in operation and with corn flakes (maize) as one of the main ingredients of the beer formula devised by Roubicek, the company decided to build its own corn processing plant in Turmero, Aragua, in order to replace imports of this raw material. This decision would be a decisive step in the later development of the food business.

In 1951, the first non-alcoholic beverage of Cervecería Polar, called Maltín Polar, was introduced.

Carlos Eduardo Stolk Mendoza, cousin of Lorenzo Alejandro Mendoza Fleury, after representing Venezuela at the United Nations during World War II, became president of Empresas Polar in 1952. His leadership contributed to a very important growth period until his retirement in 1985. Dr. Stolk was responsible for the name of the Harina P.A.N. brand and the launch of this project, and also took the first steps toward the creation and development of Fundación Polar, among other initiatives for customers, employees, and shareholders.

The corn processing plant began in 1960 the production of the precooked corn flour Harina P.A.N., based on Venezuelan patent 5176, acquired by the family company from Venezuelan mechanical engineer Luis Caballero Mejías, who invented the respective industrial process in 1954 for his own company La Arepera, C.A. This launch made the preparation of the traditional Venezuelan arepa less laborious, since it no longer required pilado maize but precooked corn flour.

Juan Lorenzo Mendoza Quintero proposed the creation of the non-profit civil association “El Puntal,” aimed at reinforcing the social action already being carried out by the company’s facilities in their localities, both for workers and their families and for the community. This would be one of his last initiatives, as Mendoza Quintero died suddenly in 1962.

In this circumstance, his father, Lorenzo Mendoza Fleury, resumed the leadership of the company, which incorporated other products such as corn oil in 1966 and animal feed in 1967, with the creation of Procría.

In 1969, Mendoza Fleury died and his other son, Lorenzo Alejandro Mendoza Quintero, a psychiatrist, assumed leadership. Under his guidance, a retirement plan for the company’s workers was created in 1972. He also promoted the idea of building a large brewery complex in the center of the country, whose construction began on December 5, 1975, in San Joaquín, Carabobo, and which started operating in 1978. Later, in 1977, the Fundación Polar was created, known since 2006 as Fundación Empresas Polar, which centralized the social initiatives of the Venezuelan consortium and was chaired by Leonor Giménez de Mendoza, wife of Mendoza Quintero.

In 1985, together with the French company Casa Martell, Empresas Polar founded Bodegas Pomar, thus beginning commercial wine production in Venezuela. From 1986, the company entered the rice processing and packaging business and, the following year, into pasta and ice cream by acquiring Helados EFE. In February 1987, Lorenzo Alejandro Mendoza Quintero died, and both his widow, Leonor Giménez de Mendoza, and his brother’s widow, Morella Pacheco Ramella, took over the management of the company.

In 1991, on the 50th anniversary of Cervecería Polar, the company changed its name to "Empresas Polar". On the grounds of the first plant, already demolished, the Centro de Atención Nutricional Infantil Antímano (Cania) was built, specializing in the interdisciplinary treatment of child malnutrition.

In 1992, Lorenzo Mendoza Giménez and Juan Lorenzo Mendoza Pacheco, members of the third generation of the Mendoza family, took over the leadership of Empresas Polar. This step led the company in 1993 into the soft drink business with the acquisition of Golden Cup, which until then only covered central Venezuela with two small plants.

In December 1996, through a strategic alliance with international partner PepsiCo, Pepsi-Cola Venezuela C.A. was created, after the Organización Cisneros gave up this brand. That year also marked the beginning of its food business in Colombia, with offices in Bogotá and a production plant for precooked corn flour, oats, and ready-to-eat arepas in Facatativá, near the capital.

=== Expansion (1999–) ===
The acquisition of the Pepsi brand license led to the construction of two large Pepsi-Cola Venezuela plants in Caucagua and Maracaibo in 1999. Subsequently, in 2001 the company acquired Mavesa and in 2002 incorporated products of the American brand Quaker Oats Company, along with its subsidiary Gatorade, both today owned by PepsiCo.

In 2003, the company consolidated under the name Alimentos Polar and expanded its cleaning products plant in Valencia, in 2009. That year, the Centro de Desarrollo Deportivo Empresas Polar opened in San Joaquín, where children and young people practice sports in an organized way.

Finally, in 2010, Alimentos Polar partnered with the Spanish Grupo Leche Pascual, installing a yogurt plant in Valencia producing the Migurt product line.

In 2012, the premium beer collection Placeres Maestros of Solera was launched, beginning with Solera Märzen (a type of Marzenbier). Later, in 2016, Solera Black (Schwarzbier) and Solera ALT (Altbier) were introduced under the same collection. Finally, in 2018, the first India Pale Ale under the name Solera IPA was launched in the Venezuelan market.

== Subsidiaries ==
- Cervecería Polar, C.A.: it produces beer and non-alcoholic beverages made with malt.
- Alimentos Polar, C.A.: made by the food-producing businesses, such as rice, oats and corn plants, including the production of Harina P.A.N. maize flour.
- Pepsi Cola Venezuela, C.A.: it produces carbonated drinks, teas, water and other sweet beverages.

== Products ==
=== Original line ===
Production of Cerveza Polar, a 5% abv lager, began during the 1940s, and eventually the company grew into the largest beer-producing company in Venezuela, also producing Solera, Solera Light, Polar Light, Polar Ice, Polar Zero and Polar Zilch.

The name comes from the polar bear, whose image appears on the beer bottles.

Maltín Polar, marketed as “energía natural y full sabor”, is another of the company's best-known products, a malta beverage, similar to a non-alcoholic ale-style beer and intended for all ages.

=== Beers ===
The company produces five different brands of lager with slight variations in abv strength and taste, such as "Solera" at 6% abv, called Verde (green) because of its bottle color, "Polar Pilsen" at 5% abv, called Negra (black) or Negrita (Blackie), "Solera Light" at 4.3% abv, called Azul (Azulita), "Polar Ice" at 4.5% abv, "Polar Light" at 4% abv. There is also a nonalcoholic beer called "Polar Zilch".

Polar's signature Pilsen product started distribution in the United States in 1985 under the leadership of Carlos Eduardo Stolk, President and Chairman of the Board of Empresas Polar for over 30 years.

Their non-alcoholic product aimed at the youth market, Maltin Polar, is basically a type of soft drink called Malta which is similar to ale beers with hops but with some caramel flavouring. Its taste is comparable to that of a dark, very sweet beer.

=== Other products ===
The company has diversified its range of products, mainly by acquiring other companies and now also produces snacks, maize flour (which is the base for the main Venezuelan meals), ice-creams (Helados Efe), soft drinks and malt beverages (Cervecería Polar, Refrescos Golden and bottles Pepsi-Cola and Diet Pepsi for the Venezuelan and North Andean market). Polar also bought the food manufacturer Mavesa, which produces mayonnaise, ketchup, margarine and a blue biodegradable soap (Las Llaves). The company also set a joint venture with the French cognac manufacturer Martell in the state of Lara to produce wines locally. The company's name is Bodegas Pomar.

Polar is currently trying to expand their frontiers, by exporting some of their products to other countries, currently some Polar products can be purchased in the United States of America. Maltin Polar, Polar Beer and Harina PAN. Recently the "Maltin Polar" and "Polar ICE" have been introduced into the Puerto Rican market.

On October 30, 2026 it was announced that the company acquired the Rico's Cheese brand.

== Economic crisis ==
During the economic crisis in Venezuela in 2016 production of beer was suspended due to the firm's inability to access a supply of barley.

== Government persecution ==
In November 2015, the pro-government parliamentary bloc requested that the Attorney General's Office open a criminal investigation against Lorenzo Mendoza, president of Empresas Polar. The request followed the release of a recorded telephone conversation between Mendoza and Ricardo Hausmann, a former Venezuelan planning minister and then director at Harvard University’s Center for International Development. The recording, broadcast by the state channel Venezolana de Televisión, featured Mendoza and Hausmann discussing Venezuela's economic crisis and the potential role of the International Monetary Fund (IMF) in providing financial assistance.Government officials, National Assembly president Diosdado Cabello, framed the conversation as evidence of a conspiracy to negotiate foreign intervention in the Venezuelan economy. President Nicolás Maduro publicly supported the investigation, describing Mendoza as acting against national interests and accusing international actors of imposing a financial blockade on the country. The move came shortly before the legislative elections of 6 December 2015, during a period of declining popularity for the ruling United Socialist Party of Venezuela.

Mendoza acknowledged the authenticity of the conversation but rejected the accusations, characterizing the disclosure as a political attempt to manipulate public opinion. Hausmann also dismissed the allegations, stating that the discussion reflected widely recognized concerns about Venezuela’s economic situation.
