= INDEPABIS =

Instituto
- Abbreviation: INDEPABIS
- Formation: 2008
- Purpose: Venezuela's consumer protection agency
- Region served: Venezuela
- Parent organization: Venezuelan Ministry of Commerce
- Website: www.indepabis.gob.ve

INDEPABIS (instituto de defensa) - Institute for Defense of People in the Access to Goods and Services) is Venezuela's consumer protection agency. It is under the control of the Ministry of Commerce.

== History ==
Indepabis was created in August 2008 under the Ley para el Derecho de las Personas en el Acceso de Bienes y Servicios (Law for the Right of Access to Goods and Services), replacing the previous Instituto para la Defensa del Consumidor y el Usuario (Indecu).

INDEPABIS' President until February 2010 was then trade minister Eduardo Samán.
