= Toddy (PepsiCo) =

Brand of powdered milk drink and cookies

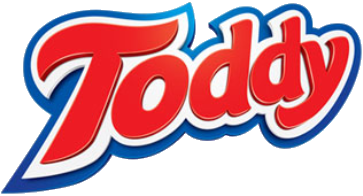
- Product type: Chocolate flavored milk, chocolate chip cookies
- Current owner: PepsiCo
- Country: U.S.
- Introduced: 1919; 107 years ago

Toddy is a brand of products owned and manufactured by PepsiCo. As of today, it is mainly marketed and sold in Argentina, Brazil, Paraguay and Venezuela, but in the 1950s-1960s it was sold as a canned beverage and marketed towards residents of the United States, especially at drive-in movie theaters where it was advertised with the cartoon mascot "Rodeo Joe".

Having originated as a chocolate-flavored milk, the Toddy products range then extended to chocolate chip cookies

== History ==
The creation of the brand can be traced to the United States in 1919, when James William Rudhard (b. 1891) and Beelzeon Oak Smith (b. 1898), invested $30 to start their own business. Being convinced that malt-based food would change the future of the food industry, Rudhard developed a formula to create a "drinkable food". The second aspect was taken by Beelzeon, who took into account was that this preparation could be consumed hot or cold. In this way, sales were assured, both in summer and winter. After about three years of experiments, Rudhard and Beelzeon developed a drink with milk and chocolate as main ingredients.

Toddy became an instant success., advertised as a "drinkable food", as a substitute for milk. Nevertheless, Rudhard and Beelzeon wanted to expand their business, mainly to Canada and Mexico. Unable to solve some legal issues for the commercialisation outside the U.S., Rudhard decided to franchise the product. In 1928, one of his employees, Puerto Rican Pedro Erasmo Santiago, took over concession for Latin America market, focusing on children as Toddy's main target. That strategy gave good result, mainly in Mexico and Argentina. In 1949, the slogan was: "Toddy, breakfast for the whole family"

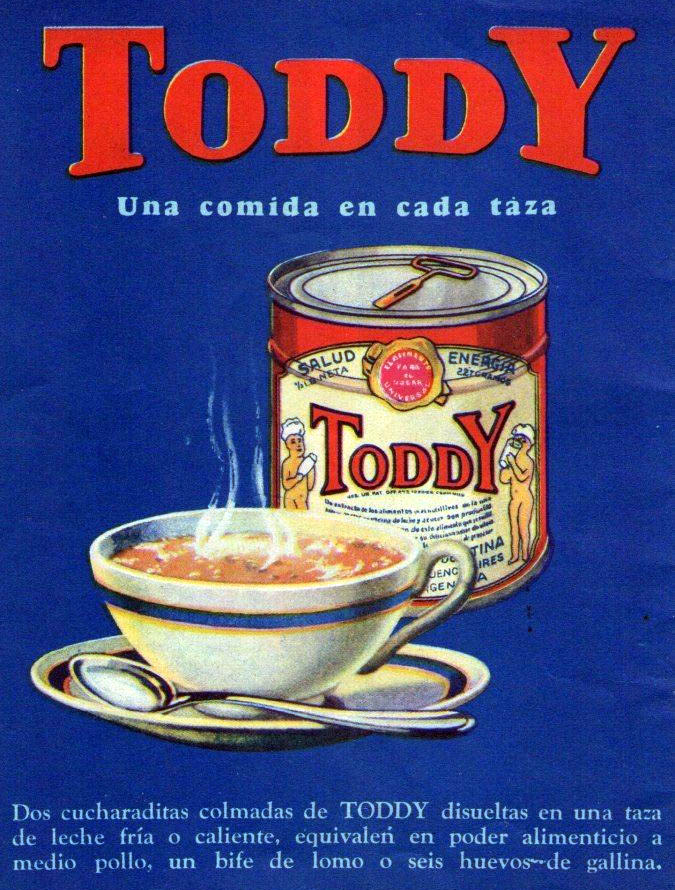
1931 ad for Toddy in Argentina, where the product became highly popular

On March 15, 1933, Pedro Erasmo Santiago was licensed by the provisory government of Getúlio Vargas to commercialize the product in Brazil. He created innovative advertising campaigns, including skywriting the product name over the skies of Rio de Janeiro.

In the 1940s, Toddy began production in Venezuela, where it is still a very popular beverage. Pedro Erasmo Santiago also commenced production of Toddy in Argentina, Portugal, Spain, and distributed the product in the Caribbean islands of Dominican Republic and Cuba. He also ventured into food processing activities, including fruit juices under the trademark Yukery. In Brazil the juice was called Yuky and in Venezuela Yukery.

As result of this venture into juice production, in the 1950s Pedro Erasmo Santiago established the largest orange juice processing and juice concentrate facility in the world, Suconasa, today Cutrale, established in Brazil.

After his death on February 8, 1966, his youngest son, Erasmo Julian Santiago Mejia, (August 12th 1936-February 12, 2008) took over the operations, later selling the companies in Venezuela due to pressure from the national government and banks in 1986.

The trademark was acquired by PepsiCo in 2001. PepsiCo updated the brand's logo to a star and three cows.

In 2009, PepsiCo introduced Toddy in Australia, and the following year in Chile.

== Toddynho ==
Toddynho (a fusion of Toddy + Portuguese diminutive suffix -inho) is a line of pre-mixed chocolate milk products also manufactured by PepsiCo. It was launched in Brazil in 1982, with children as the target audience. The drink is more well-known than the traditional Toddy, and is distributed in packages of 200 ml. It has a mascot of the same name that is a cartoony box with arms, legs and face.
