= Cachapa =

Corn pancake from Venezuela

Cachapas
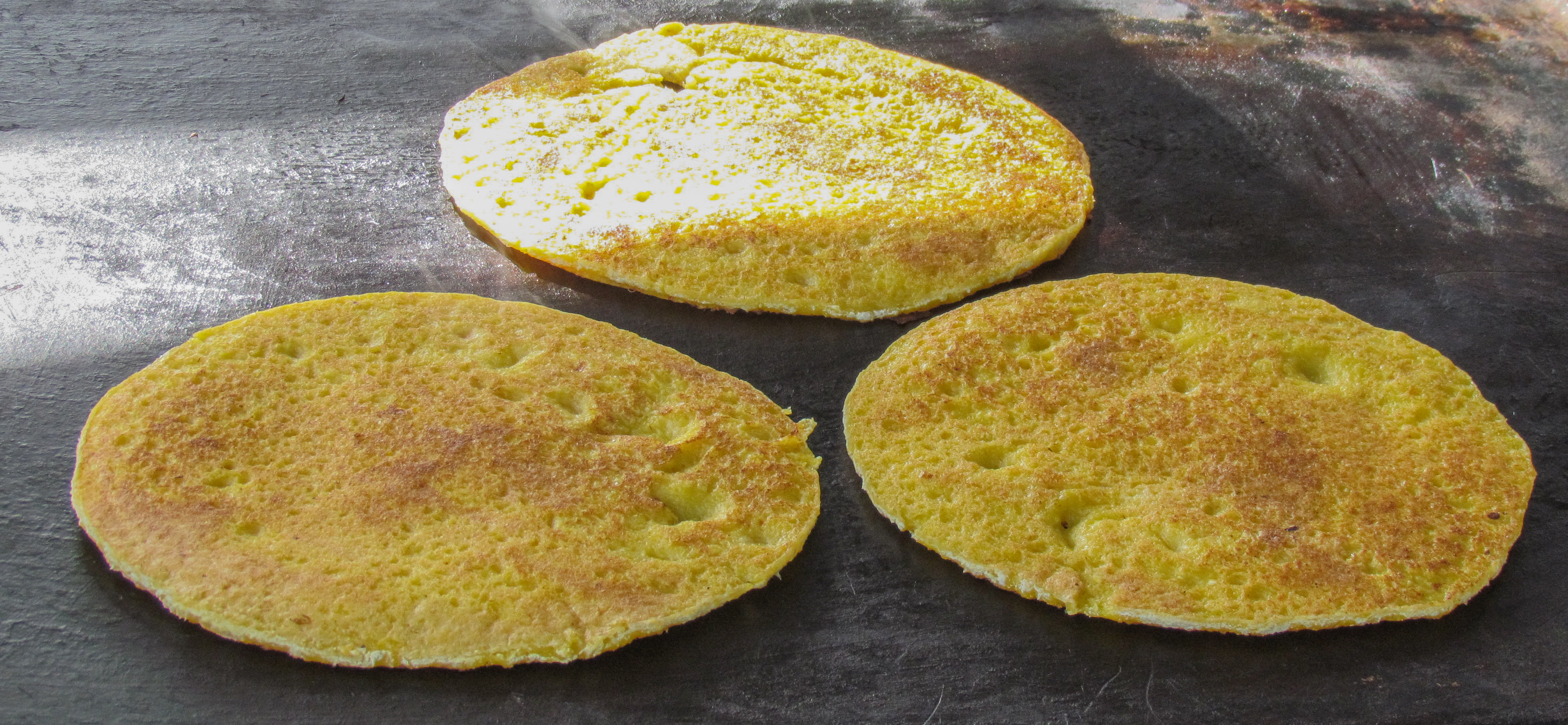
- Type: Pancake
- Place of origin: Venezuela
- Associated cuisine: Venezuelan cuisine
- Main ingredients: Ground corn

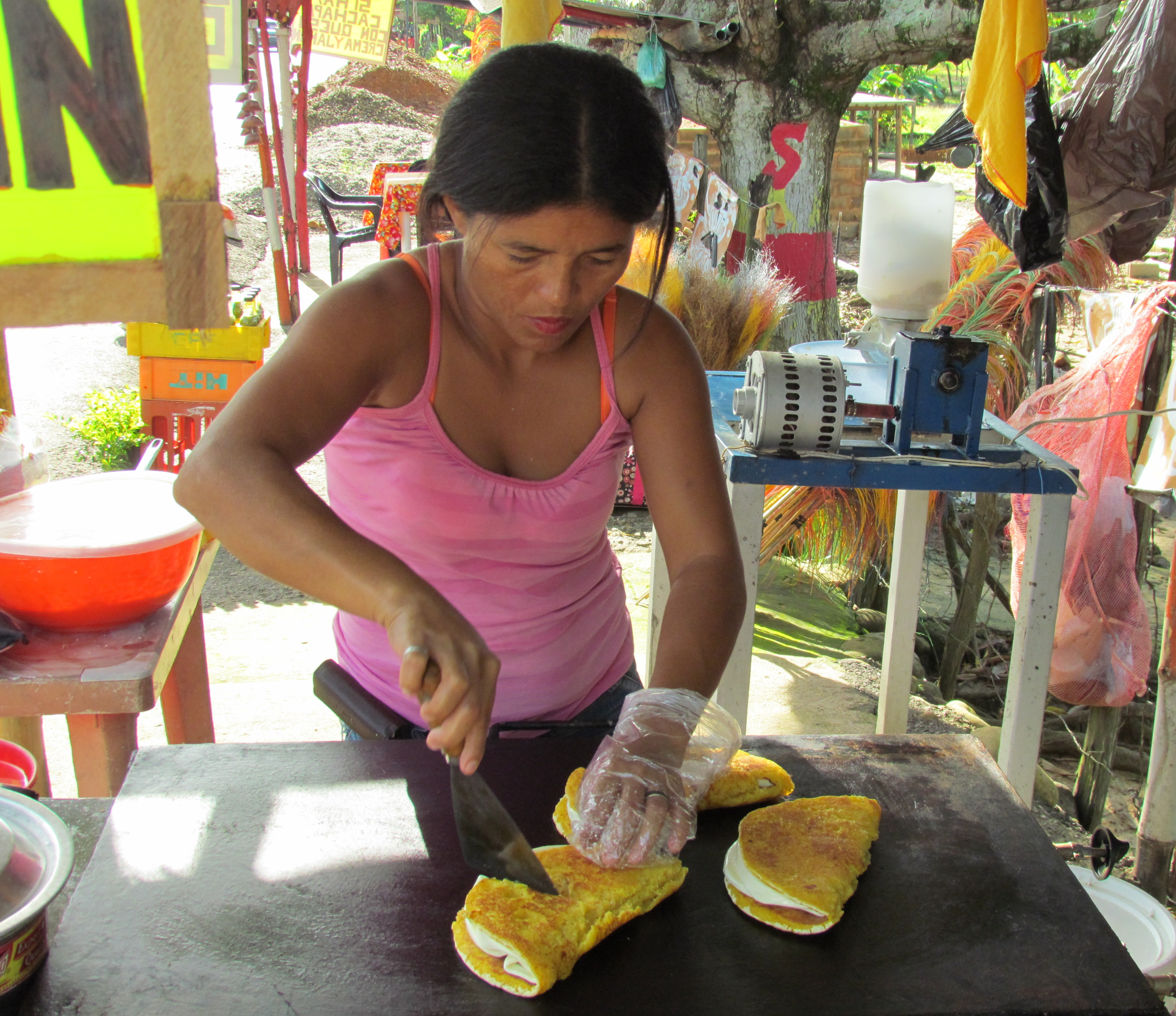
Cachapa with queso de mano

Cachapa is a traditional dish made from maize flour from Venezuela. Like arepas, they are popular at roadside stands. They can be made like pancakes of fresh corn dough, or wrapped in dry corn leaves and boiled (cachapa de hoja). The most common varieties are made with fresh ground corn mixed into a thick batter and cooked on a budare, like pancakes; the cachapa is slightly thicker and lumpier because of the pieces from corn kernels.

Cachapas are traditionally eaten with queso de mano (hand[made] cheese), a soft, fresh, white cheese, similar to fresh Italian mozzarella (but not American/Canadian mozzarella). They occasionally also contain fried pork chicharrón on the side. Cachapas can be very elaborate, some including different kinds of cheese, milky cream, or jam. They can be prepared as an appetizer, generally with margarine, or as a full breakfast with hand cheese and fried pork.

In Costa Rica, chorreadas are similar.

== Etymology ==
In the Llanos Orientales, they are known as arepas de maiz jojoto or tierno (soft corn)

In Seville, Spain, there is a similar word in the Chaima dialect, which is registered as an indigenous word "kachapa" to make a sweet arepa for the Chaima (Venezuelan tribe).

In Venezuela, the word "cachapera" refers to restaurants that sell this product. But in countries such as Venezuela and Puerto Rico, cachapera could also be a derogatory term for a lesbian.

== History ==
Cachapas are very prominent in Venezuelan cuisine; anthropological evidence shows cachapas have been eaten in Venezuela for about 3,000 years.

Cachapas have a long history, originating in pre-Columbian times when indigenous people would grind corn with a stone and cook it under their fireplaces, a common practice frequently found in Latin America.

Many believe that cachapas originated between the American tribes known as chaima cultures. Others date this traditional dish to the Yanomami, Arawak, and Parias tribe between 500 and 1,800 years ago. The north-central region of Venezuela was known for cultivating sweet corn and using it for special occasions to make cachapas.

Today, this product can be bought pre-made or at specific restaurants, but many locals prefer to eat them as street food. Cachapas have adopted many shapes and forms over the years and have accommodated restrictive diets such as vegetarian or gluten-free.

Corn's presence has remained stable in Venezuelan cuisine as they use sweet corn in many of their main dishes, such as arepas, empanadas, and cachapas. Consumers can find cachapas in any type of establishment, from street trucks to high-end restaurants, due to their popularity and significance in the country.

This Venezuelan food is fried and made with fresh corn, and modern cachapas are made with the addition of several ingredients such as salt and sugar to improve the flavor. Modern cachapas are made with a combination of corn, milk, salt, water, and sugar, and fillings like roasted pork and queso de mano ("hand[made] cheese") have been introduced by restaurants. Nowadays, people have skipped fresh corn and switched to canned or frozen corn to modernize and speed up the process.

== Characteristics ==
Cachapas are usually served folded in half with lots of butter and the desired filling inside. They have a crispy exterior, and the inside is tender to simulate the texture of a pancake. Still, the color of the cachapas is yellowish due to the cornmeal, which makes it easier to differentiate between American pancakes and Venezuelan "pancakes."

== Preparation ==
The batter is made with tender corn kernels, sugar, milk, salt and melted butter.

== See also ==
- List of pancakes
