= Arepa =

South American corn flatbread

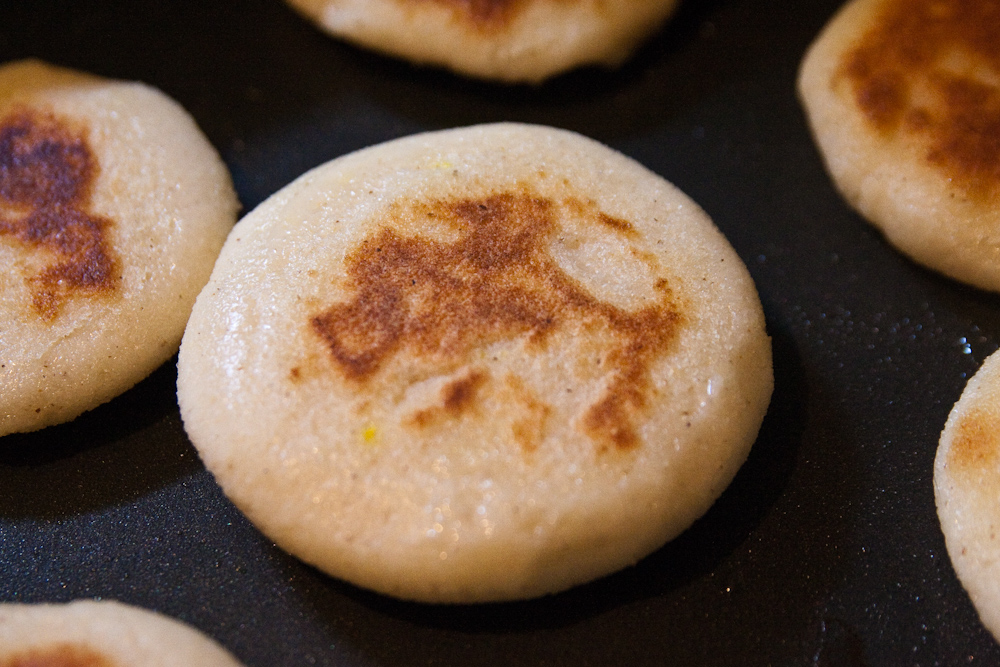
- Arepas in Venezuela
- Alternative names: Tijitafun, fectegua
- Course: Any course
- Place of origin: Colombia and Venezuela
- Region or state: Northern South America
- Associated cuisine: Colombian cuisine, Venezuelan cuisine
- Main ingredients: Corn flour (maize meal or flour)
- Variations: Sweet corn arepa, arepa de arroz, arepa de huevo, arepa de yuca, arepa rellena, arepa paisa, arepa de plátano maduro

An arepa (Spanish pronunciation: [aˈɾepa]) is a type of flatbread made of ground maize dough that may be stuffed with a filling, eaten in northern parts of South America since pre-Columbian times, and notable primarily in the cuisine of Colombia and Venezuela, but also present in Bolivia, Ecuador, and Central America.

Arepa can be served with accompaniments, such as cheese, cuajada, various types of meat, avocado, or diablito (deviled ham spread). It can also be split to make sandwiches. Sizes, maize types, and added ingredients vary based on preparation. It is similar to the Mexican gordita, the Salvadoran pupusa, the Ecuadorian tortilla de maíz, and the Panamanian tortilla or changa.

== Origins ==
The arepa is the name given to a pre-Columbian dish in the area that is now Colombia, Panama and Venezuela, but it exists in other parts of the Americas. Instruments used to make flour for the arepas, and the clay slabs on which they were cooked, were often found at archaeological sites in the area. Although it has not been specified in which country an arepa was cooked for the first time, it has been possible to define the oldest dates of the presence of maize in Colombia and Venezuela. For example, in Colombia, the first record of the presence of corn cultivation dates from about 6,000 years ago. However, the presence of arepas dates from 3,000 years ago (specifically in the Altiplano Cundiboyacense by the Muisca), while in Venezuela, the estimate is about 2,800 years ago.

Throughout its history, the arepa has stayed mainly unchanged from the arepas that pre-Columbian native peoples would have consumed, making the arepa one of the few pre-contact traditions that have remained popular in the years since colonization. The name arepa is related to erepa, the word for 'cornbread' in the Cumanagoto language.

== Characteristics ==
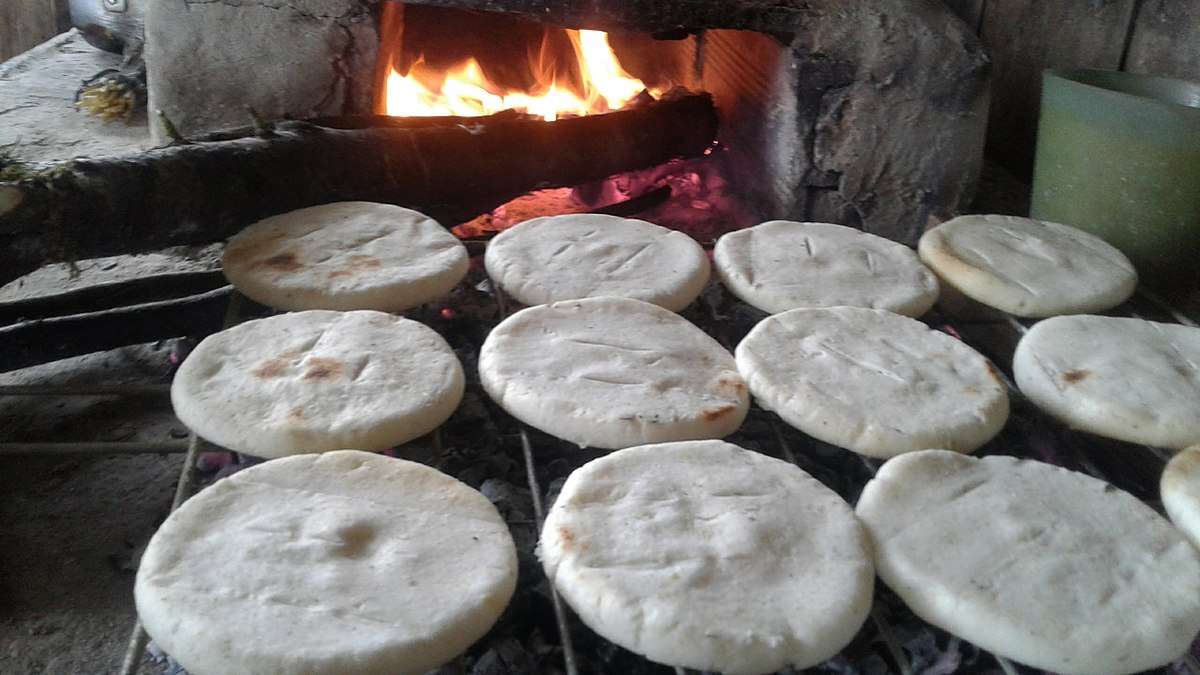
Arepas being prepared

The arepa is a flat, round, unleavened patty of soaked, ground kernels of maize, or—more frequently nowadays—maize meal or maize flour. It can be grilled, baked, fried, boiled, or steamed. The characteristics vary by color, flavor, size, and the food with which it may be stuffed, depending on the region. Simple arepas are filled with butter or cheese and baked. Depending on the meal, more filling varieties can be added with combinations of ingredients like beans, meat, avocados, eggs, tomatoes, salad, shrimp, or fish. Fried arepas are often consumed in northern South America, filled with white cheese on top and served with fried eggs. Sweet fried arepas are another variety often prepared with sugarloaf (papelón) and anise (anís). Venezuelan white cheese is another topping for fried arepas that can be combined with feta cheese.

== Production ==
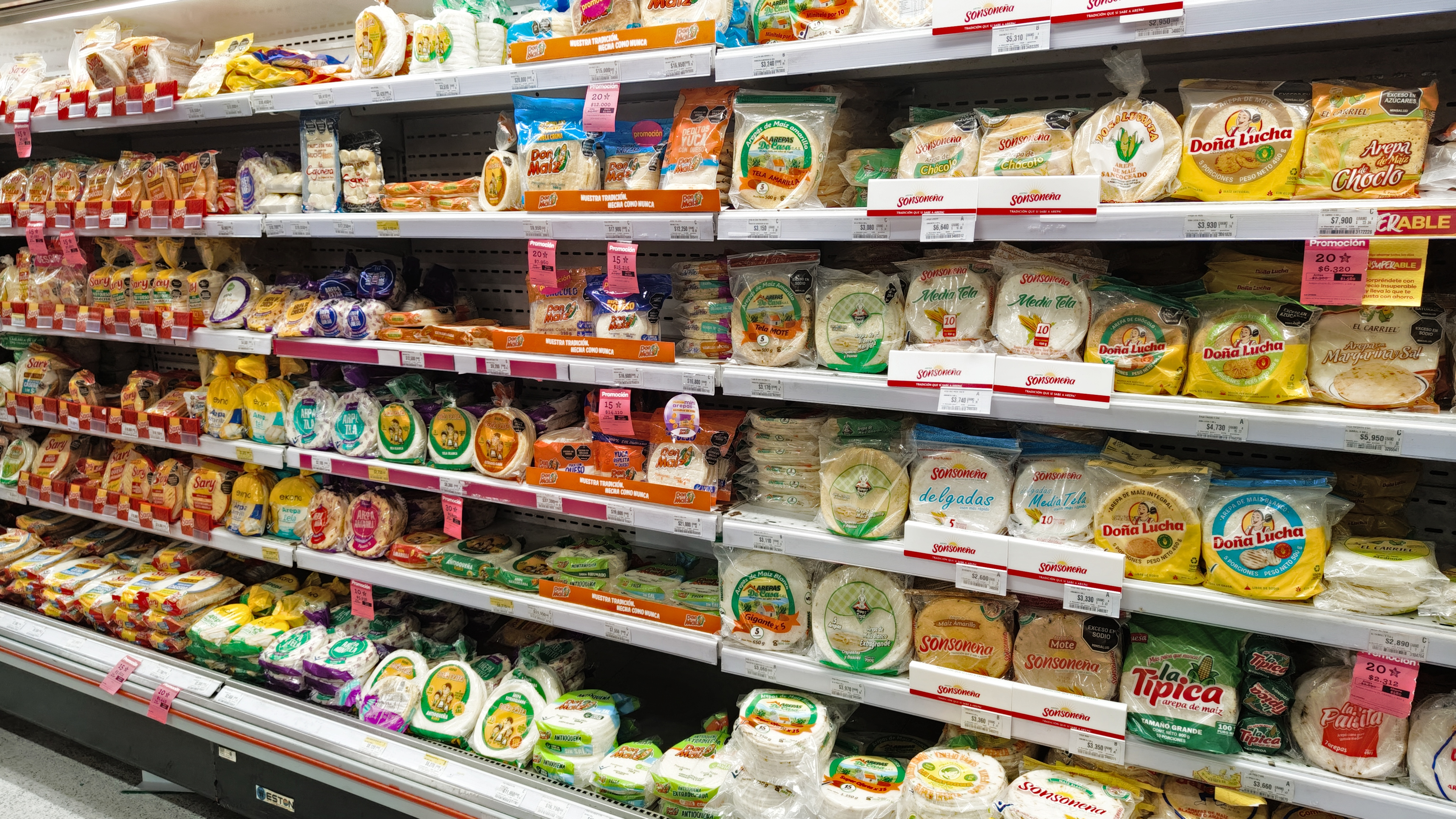
Variety of pre-roasted arepas at a supermarket in Colombia

Initially, arepa flour was made by grinding maize at home. In the 1950s, precooked arepa flour was invented by Dr. Luis Caballero Mejías, a Venezuelan engineer, and became an instant success. The flour is mixed with water and salt, and occasionally oil, butter, eggs or milk. Because the flour is already cooked, the blend forms into patties easily. After being kneaded and formed, the patties are fried, grilled, or baked. Some varieties of arepas are made with "peeled" corn using the nixtamalization process; they are known as arepa pelada.

Arepa flour is specially prepared (cooked in water, then dried) for making arepas and other maize dough-based dishes, such as hallacas, bollos, tamales, empanadas, atole and chicha. The flour may be called masarepa, masa de arepa, masa al instante, or harina precocida. It is not nixtamalized. The most popular brand names of maize flour are Harina PAN and Harina Juana in Venezuela produced by the companies Alimentos Polar and Monaca; Doñarepa in Colombia produced by the company Harinera del Valle; and Goya elsewhere.

However, in countries such as Colombia, it is not common to reconstitute corn flour as it is in Venezuela. Thus, in Colombia, it is more common to see pre-roasted arepas ready for consumption in stores and supermarkets, giving rise to an industry that in 2019 alone had sales of US$124 million with companies such as Arepas Sary and Alpina Productos Alimenticios.

== Regional varieties ==
The dish is known in multiple cuisines. According to food anthropologist Ocarina Castillo of the Central University of Venezuela, the dish is likely thousands of years old and originated in the region now occupied by the two countries before colonizers of the area drew borders.

=== Bolivia ===
Bolivian arepas are made from corn. There are different ways to prepare arepas, but one of the most traditional is the Cotoca recipe. Several varieties of arepa can be found in the country, such as the Cruceña and Andina varieties.

=== Colombia ===
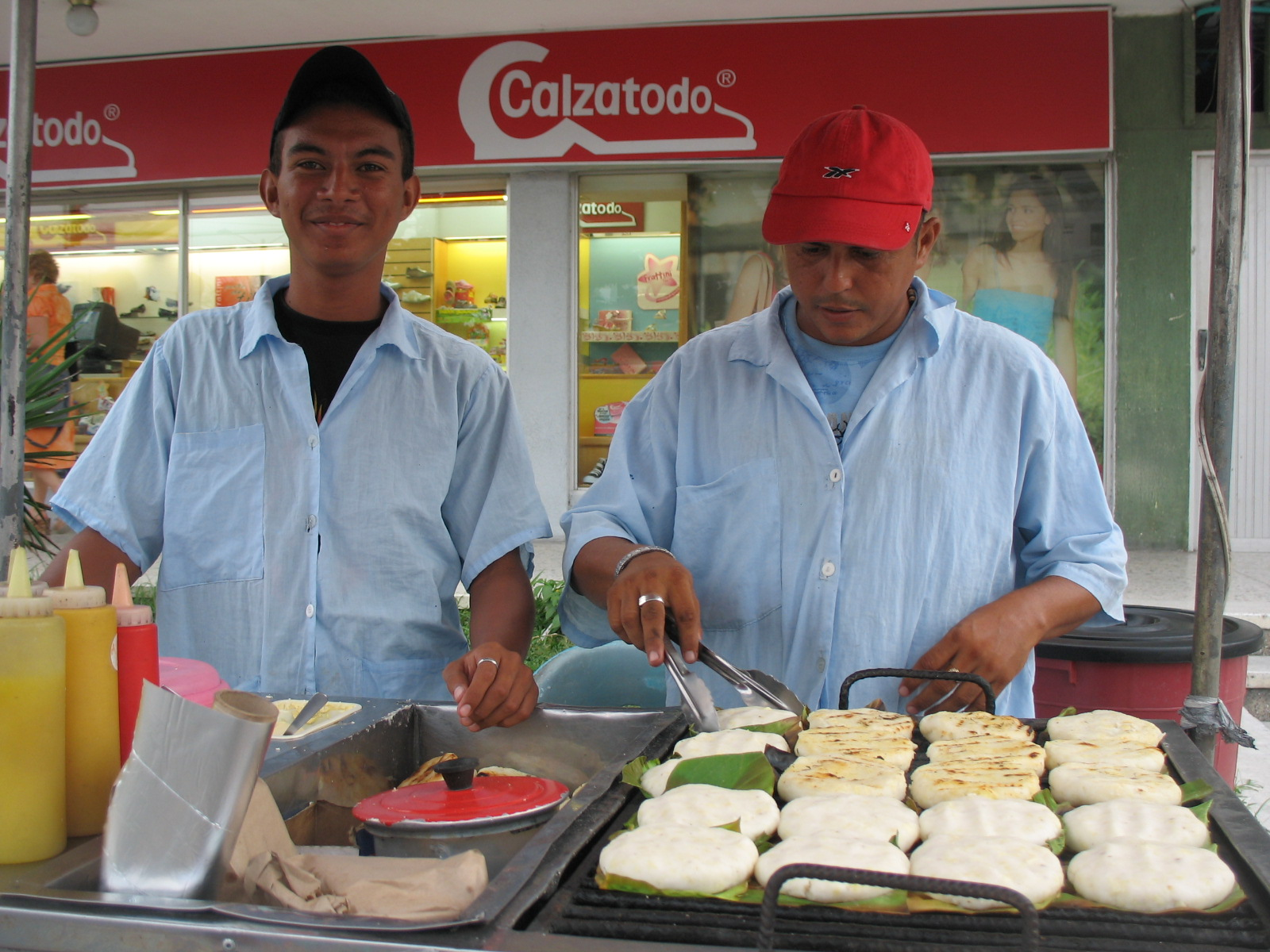
Street vendor selling grilled arepas on bijao leaves in Barranquilla

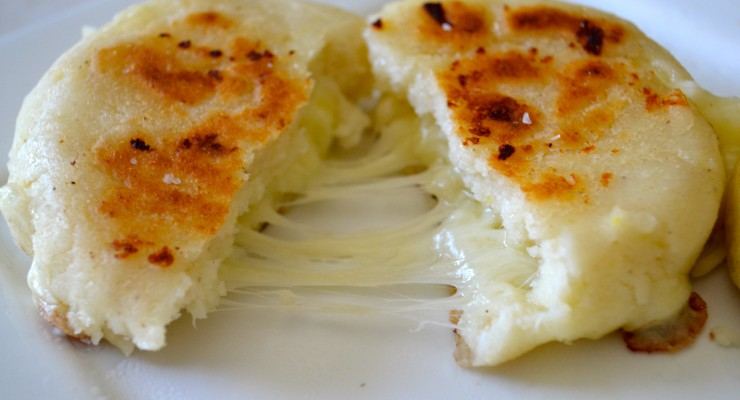
Colombian arepa con queso (arepa with cheese)

The first record of the existence of arepas dates from about 3,000 years ago in what is currently Colombia.

The arepa is an iconic food in Colombia, with some 75 distinct preparation forms. According to a study conducted by the Colombian Academy of Gastronomy, the arepa is part of the Colombian cultural heritage and can be considered a symbol of national gastronomic unity.

In 2006, the arepa was named the cultural symbol of Colombia in a competition organized by Semana magazine with support from Caracol Televisión, the Ministry of Culture and 'Colombia is Passion'.

In the Paisa region, the arepa is especially important to the local people and sometimes accompanies all meals of the day. In addition, arepas are strung into necklaces and placed around the necks of honored dignitaries as a sign of praise. Many varieties of arepa were introduced from this region.

In Colombia, the arepa is sold commercially in neighborhood stores, chain supermarkets, and market plazas and packaged with preservatives as a pre-molded white or yellow corn dough ready to grill or fry at home. It is also sold in the form of industrialized corn flour that requires hydration before preparation. In addition, arepas are sold by street vendors, in cafeterias, and in neighborhood stores.

Restaurants of the Paisa Region offer a wide variety of arepas, including a unique style of stuffed arepa that can be filled with eggs, meat, or cheese. Colombians in the Caribbean region commonly eat a breakfast variation called arepa con huevo, which consists of a cooked arepa which has been split open, stuffed with a raw egg, and fried.

The Colombian Arepa Festival is celebrated in Barranquilla, Bogotá, Bucaramanga, Cali and Medellín. Each city takes turns organizing the festival between August and December. There are also many other types of arepas, including arepa de choclo, arepa de queso, arepa frita, arepa costeña, arepa de yuca, and arepa paisa.

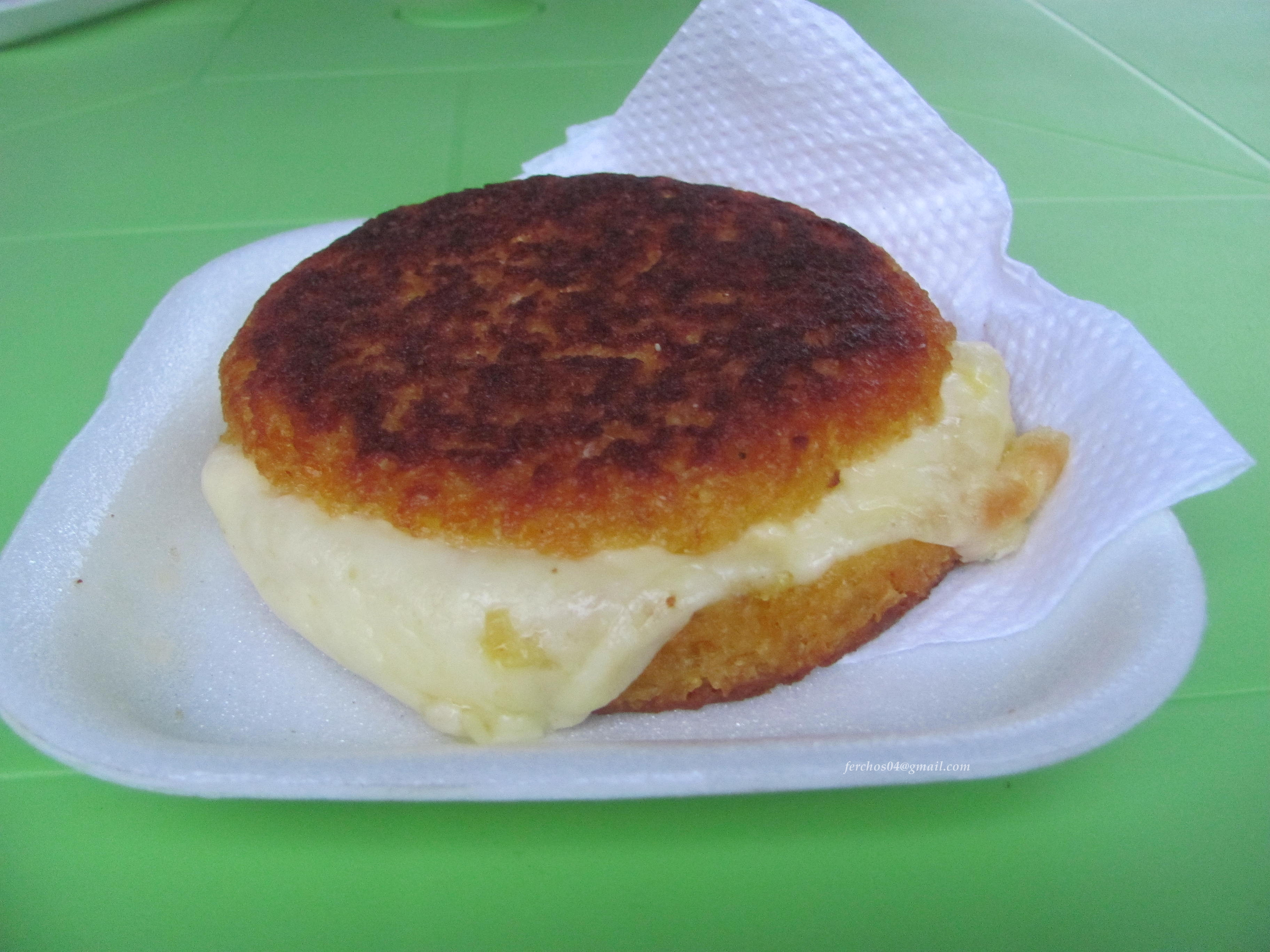
Arepa de Choclo

==== Variations by region ====
According to the Santa Marta City newspaper, El Informador, there are about 75 types of arepas around Colombia; among them is the arepa ocañera, consumed in the Department of Norte de Santander, characterized by the addition of queso costeño (lit. 'coastal cheese') and other types of meat. Some recipes for this type of arepa can contain doble crema cheese and chicken. One of its characteristics is that it is relatively thin unlike other arepas and also has a toasted and golden colored shell.

Another variation is the arepa boyacense, with the Municipality of Ventaquemada being one of the most outstanding in terms of its production. This type of arepa may contain butter, eggs, and cheese. It has a certain sweetness, and in some recipes, this arepa may have cuajada.

There is also the arepa paisa, which is consumed in the Department of Antioquia. It is prepared with maíz trillado (lit. 'threshed corn'). This form most closely resembles indigenous cuisine.

In addition, another arepa variation consumed in the Andean region of the country is the arepa santandereana, which contains cooked yuca and chicharrón.

=== Costa Rica ===
In the Province of Guanacaste, arepas are prepared in the form of large, toasted sponge cakes, seasoned with Bagaces type cheese. In Cartago, during colonial times, arepas were filled with pork.

=== Puerto Rico ===
In Puerto Rico, mainly in the San Juan area and beach sides, arepas are popular. They can also be found in some restaurants, almost always as arepas de coco. The Puerto Rican arepa is made with wheat flour, coconut milk, coconut oil, baking powder, and sugar. They can be fried, baked, or cooked on a grill. Once done, the arepa is cut open and stuffed. There are countless fillings. Crab, shrimp, and octopus stewed in sofrito, lemon, coconut milk, and ginger, among other ingredients, are the most popular.

=== Spain ===
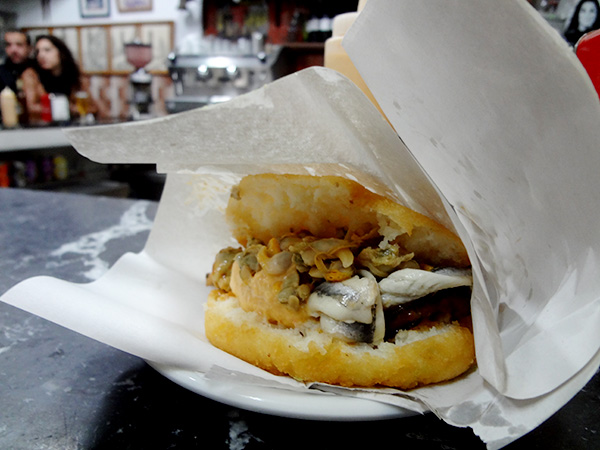
Arepa Gomera in La Laguna, Tenerife, Canary Islands

Arepas are present in the Canary Islands due to population flow between the islands and Venezuela. They are found in the province of Santa Cruz de Tenerife and rarely in the archipelago's eastern islands. Many of the arepas consumed in the islands' bars and restaurants are fried. Some incorporate ingredients from local gastronomy such as soft cheese or Canary plantain.

=== Venezuela ===
The arepa is a symbol of Venezuelan gastronomy and one of the most common pre-Hispanic foods still popular in Venezuela. The first records of this dish are about 2,800 years ago.

According to a 2015 survey of the Venezuelan people, nearly 70 percent of the nation ate arepas regularly. It is common for Venezuelans to eat arepas throughout the day, both as snacks and as sides to meals, creating a culture where these corn products (Harina PAN) can be found almost everywhere and in specific restaurants called areperas.

The arepa is seen as a cornerstone of a Venezuelan diet; prior to the 2015 food shortages, it was estimated that each year the average Venezuelan consumed about 30 kilos of the corn flour used to make arepas. Venezuelan arepas are commonly filled with a great variety of different fillings, from beef and avocado to cheese, varying widely by the location of where they are sold and the ingredients that can be obtained.

In Venezuela's Andes region, arepas de trigo are made with wheat flour rather than cornmeal. These lighter arepas are generally eaten as a snack or an accompaniment to heavier meals.

Former Venezuelan president Nicolás Maduro "has tried to use arepas as a nationalist rallying point, if not a political tool, claiming the food is from his country alone", according to the New York Times.

== See also ==
- Cachapa
- Gordita
- Pupusa
- List of breads
- List of maize dishes
