= Lorenzo Mendoza =

Venezuelan businessman (born 1965)

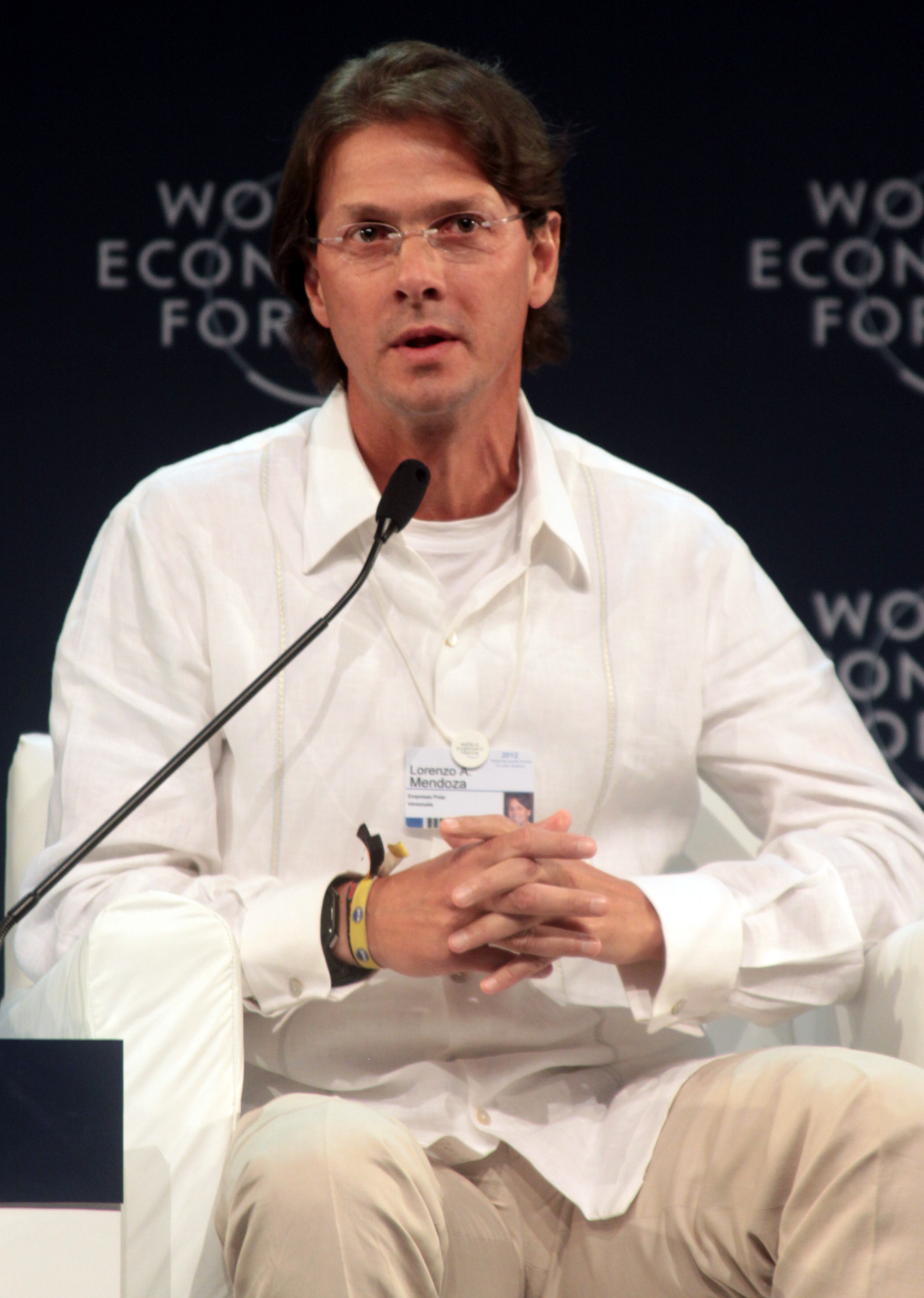
- Mendoza in 2012
- Born: 5 October 1965 (age 60); Caracas, Venezuela
- Education: Fordham University (BA); MIT Sloan School of Management (MBA)
- Occupation: Businessman
- Title: CEO, Empresas Polar
- Spouse: Maria Alexandra Pulido
- Children: 4

Lorenzo Alejandro Mendoza Giménez (born 5 October 1965) is a Venezuelan billionaire businessman, and CEO of Empresas Polar, Venezuela's largest privately held company, with $7 billion in annual sales. The company was founded by his grandfather and is currently owned by his family. Mendoza has been listed as one of the top 10 people believed to rebuild Venezuela.

Lorenzo Mendoza has made a fortune selling beer and basic food items including flour, condiments, tuna fish, and wine through Empresas Polar, Venezuela's largest food company that was founded by his grandfather.

He is a former Member of the Boards of AES La Electricidad de Caracas, CANTV-Verizon, and BBVA Banco Provincial. He was also a Member of the Board of Grupo GEPP, Member of the Boards of MIT Sloan, the Latin American Board of Georgetown University, Group of Fifty (G-50), the Latin America Conservation Council (LACC), and the Latin American Business Council, and Member of the Boards of Trustees of Universidad Metropolitana, and Instituto de Estudios Superiores de Administración (IESA). Ashoka Fellow and Member of the World Economic Forum (named a Global Young leader in 2005).

== Early life ==
Mendoza was born in Semillero, Caracas to Lorenzo Alejandro Mendoza Quintero and Leonor Giménez Pocaterra.

Mendoza attended the Hun School of Princeton in New Jersey, and went on to receive a bachelor's degree in industrial engineering from Fordham University, and an MBA in 1993 from the MIT Sloan School of Management.

== Polar holding ==
Mendoza is the third generation of the family that controls Empresas Polar, Venezuela's largest privately held company, founded by his grandfather as a beer company in 1941.

Empresas Polar is a holding that owns: Polar Brewery, Polar Foods, and Pepsi Venezuela. The brewery produces a Venezuelan popular beer called Polar, named after the polar bear. Polar Foods makes basic food products from corn flour and condiments to tuna fish and wine. Pepsi Venezuela fabricates different types of beverages. In 2009 Polar was affected by Venezuelan president Hugo Chavez's land reform policies when the government took over one of the company's properties claiming the land was being underused.

Along with his family, Lorenzo supports one of Venezuela's largest charities, Fundacion Polar. The focus of the nonprofit organization is children's nutrition, health, and education.

As of November 2015, Forbes estimated his net worth at US$2.7 billion.

On June 8, 2018, Lorenzo Mendoza was invited to an MBA convocation in the Massachusetts Institute of Technology, to speak about resilience in the business world, regarding the Venezuelan crisis. The company ("Empresas Polar") is one of Venezuela's major employers and is seen as a symbol of resilience in a country rocked by political and economic turmoil.

== Personal life ==
He is married to Maria Alexandra Pulido and has four children. In his free time, he likes to practice sports such as tennis, water skiing, snow skiing, baseball, and running.

== See also ==
- List of billionaires
