= Chuzo desgranado =

Colombian fast food

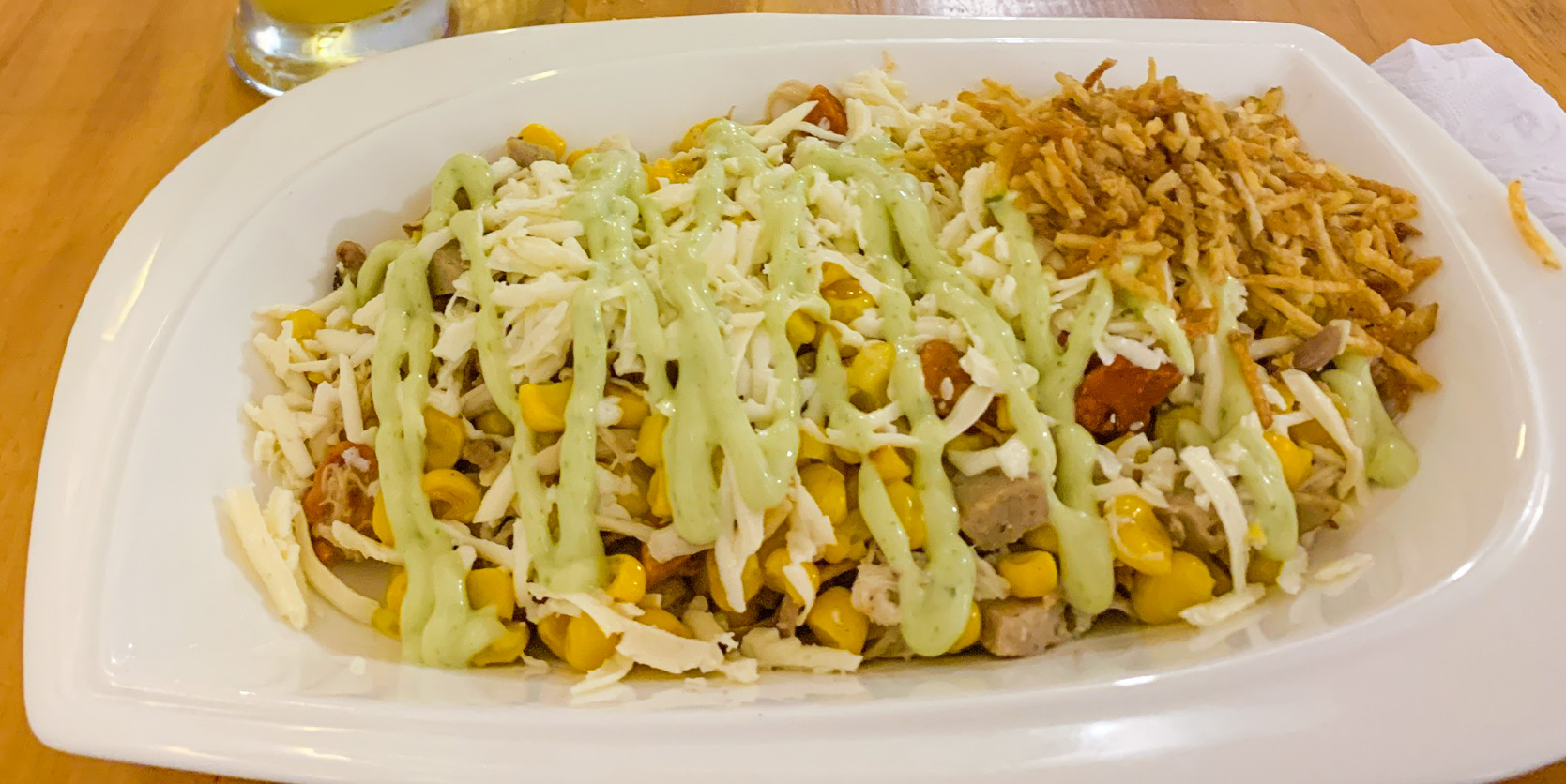
- Chuzo desgranado
- Place of origin: Colombia
- Main ingredients: variety of meats, cheese, corn, lettuce, and sauces

Chuzo desgranado is a typical fast food that originated from Barranquilla and spread throughout the Caribbean region of Colombia that contains charcoal-grilled meats such as chicken, beef, pork loin and ribs, bacon, chorizo, sausages and botifarra, small fried potato pieces (used as a topping for hot dogs), Costeño cheese, mozzarella cheese, bollo limpio and/or French fries, cooked sweet corn kernels, lettuce and sauces (tartar, salsa rosada, mayonnaise, pineapple) to suit the consumer. There is also the option of a "chuzo light" which does not include the fries or bollo limpio.

One study demonstrated that university students considered this dish an identifying feature of Barranquilla.
