= Arroz de lisa =

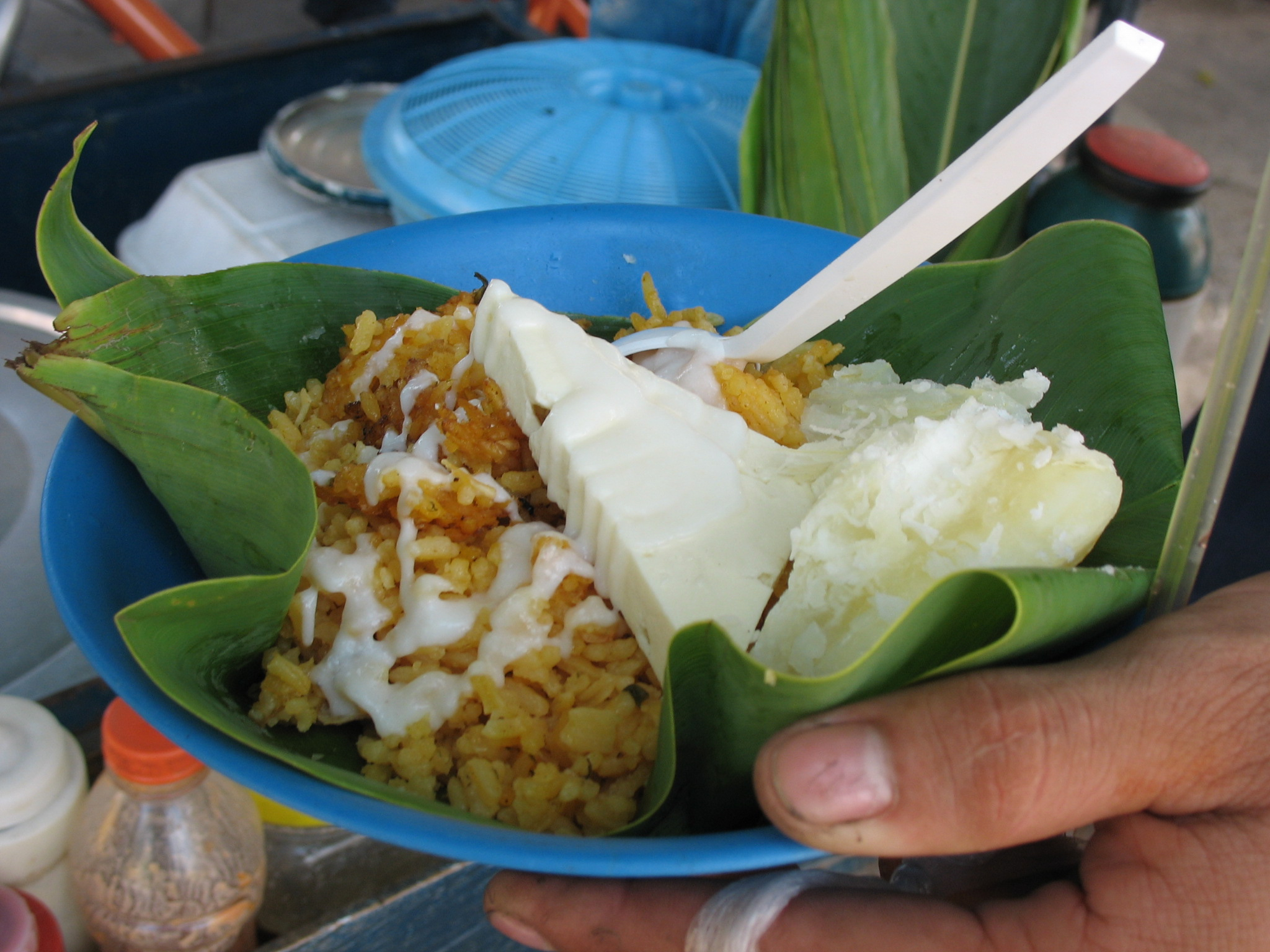
Arroz de lisa (mullet rice) from Barranquilla served in bijao leaf with cooked yuca, a triangle of costeño cheese and a sauce of suero atollabuey

Arroz de lisa (mullet rice) is a traditional Colombian cuisine dish from the Atlantic (Caribbean Sea) coast. It is cooked with mullet, a sea fish found in brackish waters, like those at river mouths.

In addition to the mullet which are usually dried and salted previously, the rice contains vegetables (e.g., onion, ají dulce, onion), and spices (e.g., paprika, cumin, salt, pepper). It is usually served in a leaf with minced chives, accompanied by bollo, avocado salad, and guarapo.

== See also ==
- List of rice dishes
- Queso costeño
- Suero atollabuey
- Butifarra Soledeñas
- Bollo
