= Juane =

Typical dish of Peruvian Amazonia

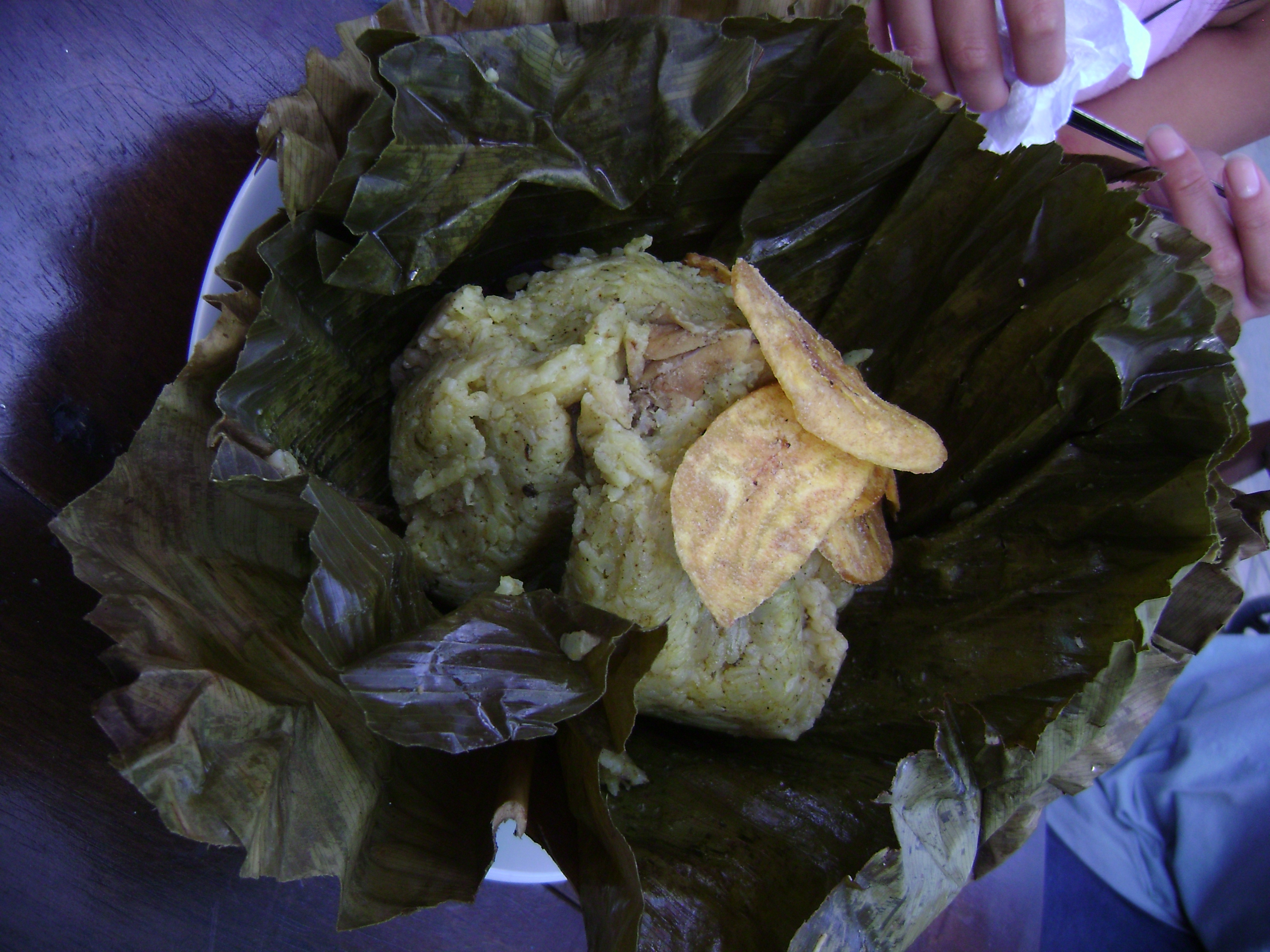
- An unwrapped juane with chicken.
- Place of origin: Peru
- Main ingredients: rice, meat, olives, hard-boiled egg, spices among others, bijao (macaw-flower) leaves

The juane is one of the main dishes of the cuisine of the Peruvian jungle and is widely consumed on June 24, the feast of St. John the Baptist (San Juan), hence the name. It is known that after the arrival of the Spanish people to Incan lands, missionaries popularized the biblical account of the beheading of St. John. This dish's name could therefore be, more specifically, a reference to the head of St. John. It possibly originated in the city of Moyobamba.

The juane would have been a food usually made for travelers, as they could be stored for long periods without spoiling.

== Basic preparation ==
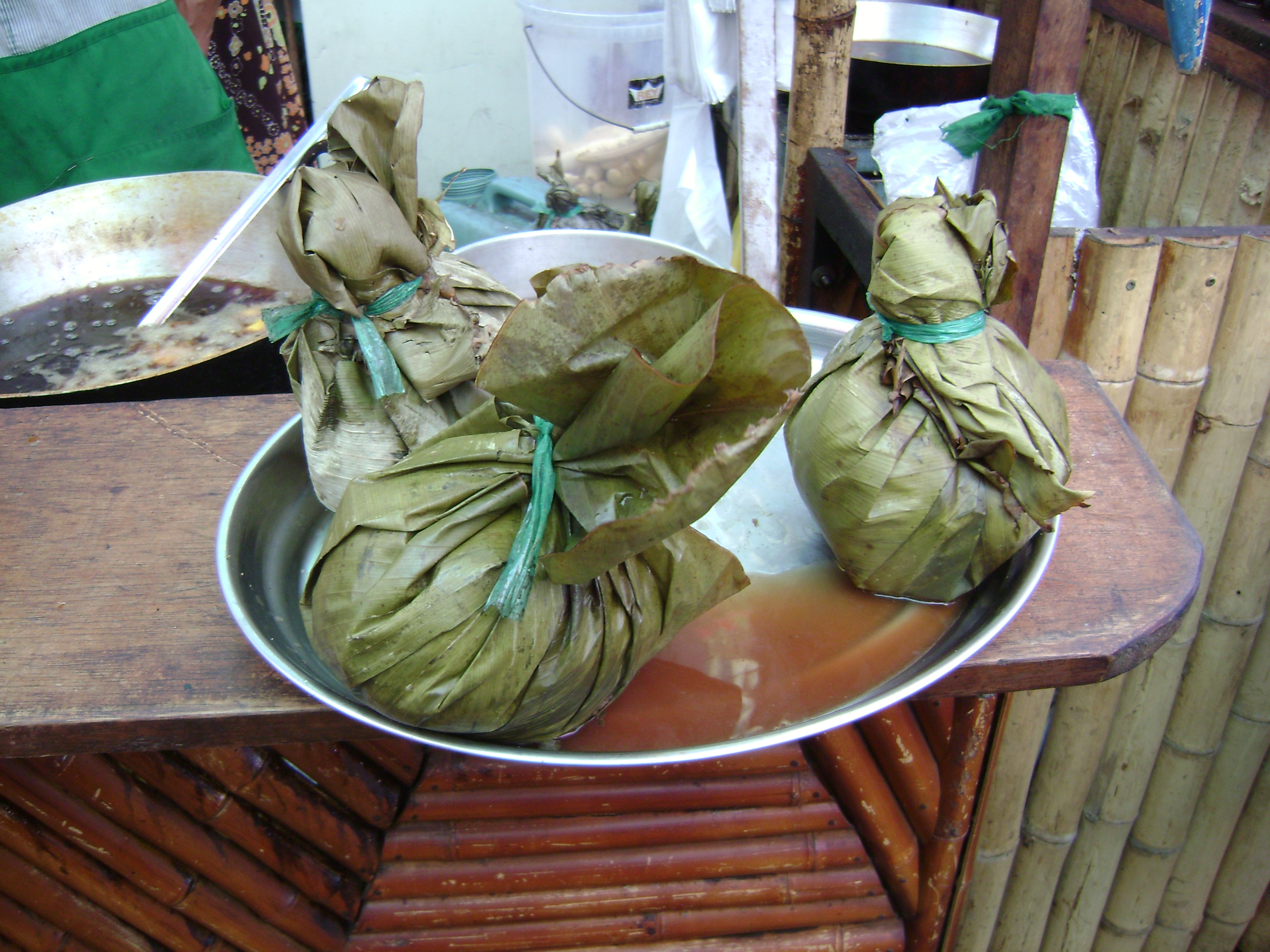
Wrapped chicken juane

The juane usually made on the basis of rice, meat, olives, hard-boiled egg, spices among others, which is wrapped with bijao (macaw-flower or heliconia) leaves and then put to boil for about an hour and a half. Rice can be substituted with cassava, chonta, the mixture of rice and cassava, beans, among other products. Before being wrapped in the leaves, the preparation is bathed with a mixture of beaten eggs to get the "pickup" (ligue in Spanish) of food and not fall off. The dish is accompanied by the customs of each region of the forest, as some people tend to accompany the tacacho, cassava, or simply boiled bananas.

== Types ==
- Traditional juane
- Special juane
- Chonta juane: Nibbled chonta is added to the mixture of rice.
- Yuca juane (Quechua yuka cassava): This type of juane is ground cassava instead of rice and filled with fish, especially paiche.
- Avispa juane: Ground pork is added to rice, and thereby prepare the batter, filling with a barrage of fried chicken.
- Nina juane (Quechua nina fire): It is a juane with chicken pieces instead of rice.
- Sara juane (Quechua sara maize): Instead of rice, it takes a mixture of ground raw peanuts, ground corn and chicken broth.
