= Suero =

Fermented-milk-based condiment

Suero, also referred to as suero costeño or suero atollabuey, is a fermented-milk-based condiment from Colombia's Caribbean coastal region. It is somewhat similar to yogurt or sour cream. It is served as an accompaniment for various dishes and snacks. It is believed to be introduced by Arab Colombians, as a local adaptation of labneh.

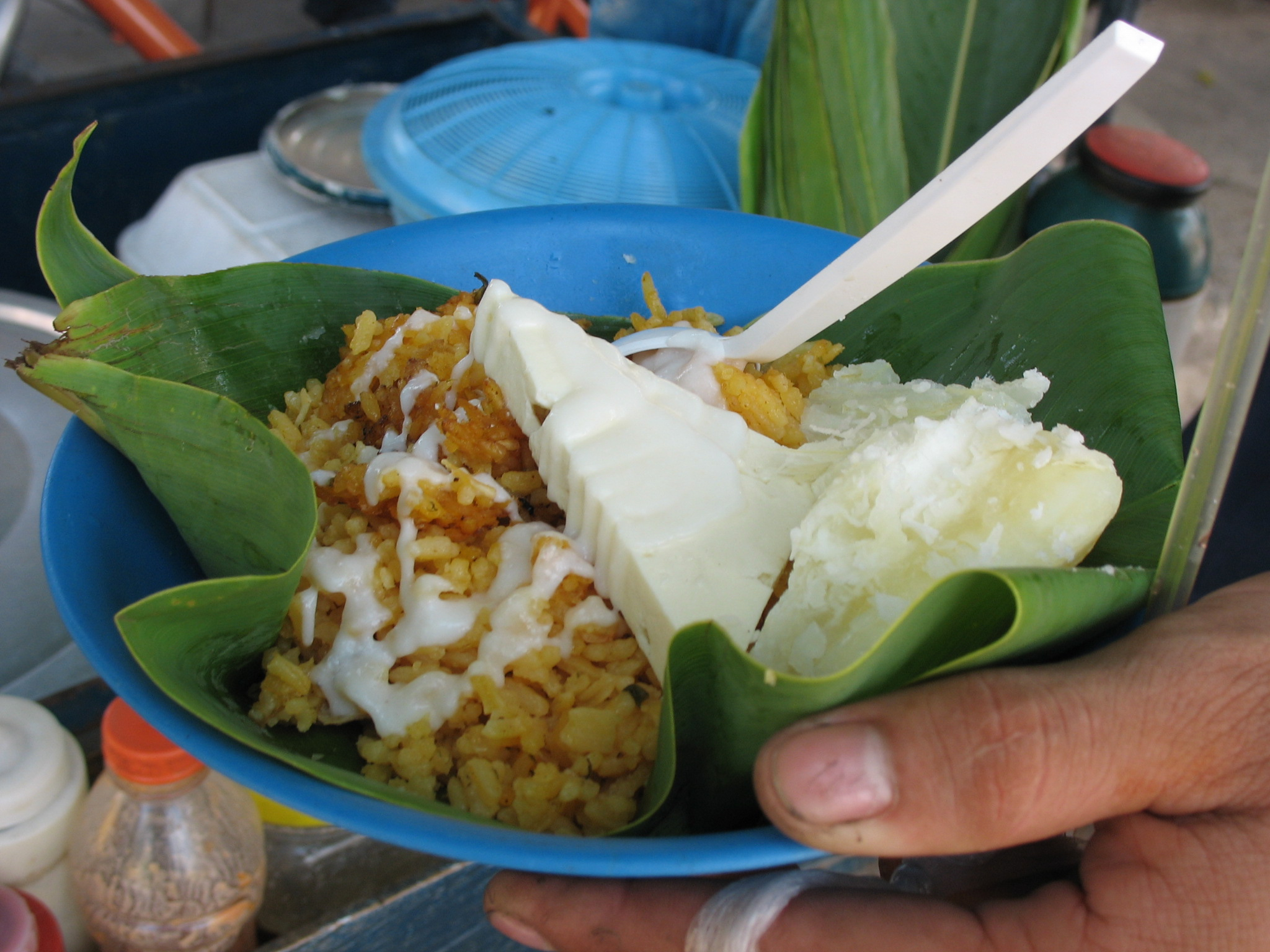
Arroz de lisa (mullet rice) from Barranquilla served in bijao leaf with cooked yuca, a triangle of costeño cheese and a sauce of suero atollabuey.

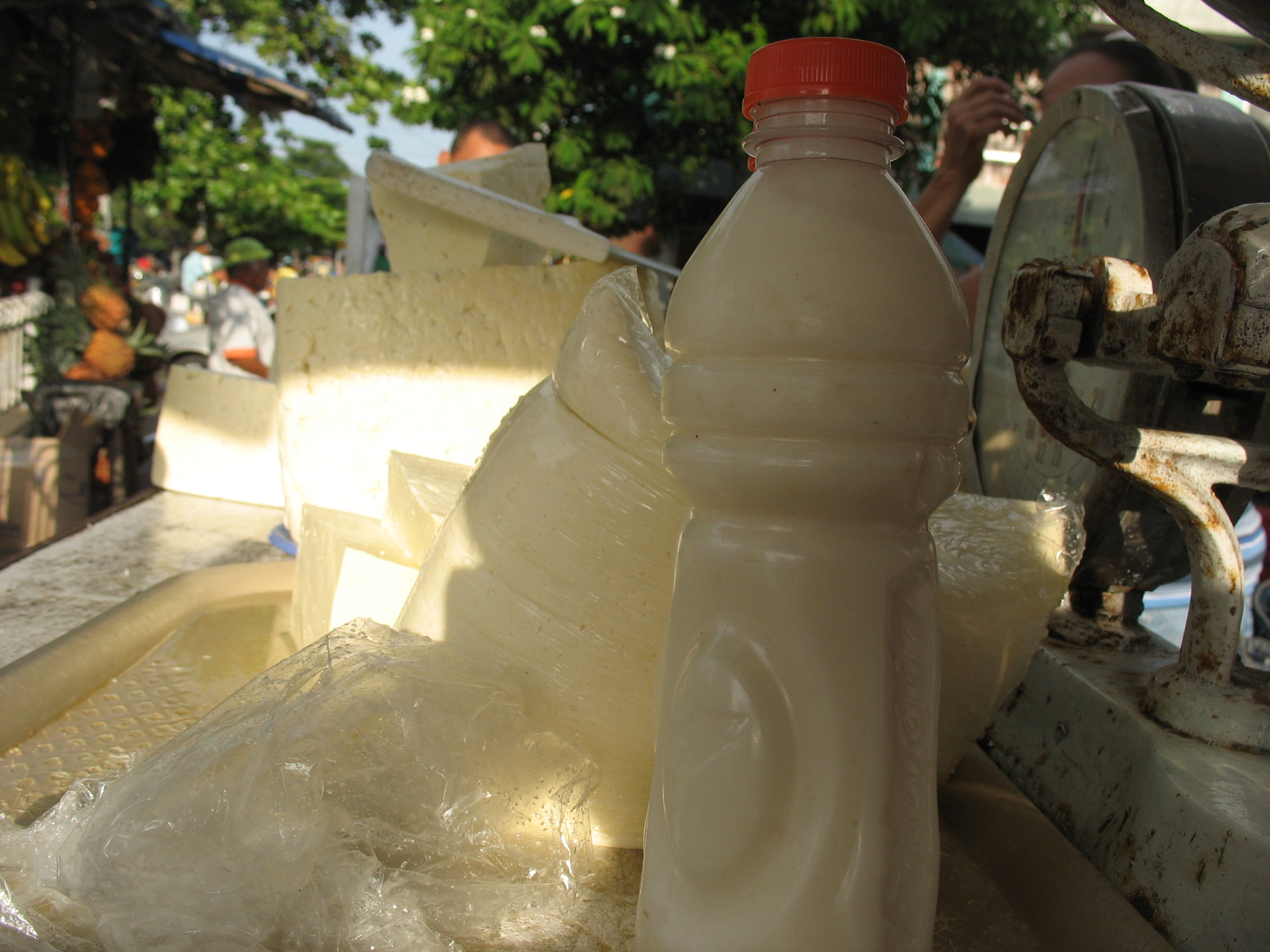
A bottle of suero costeño in foreground and costeño cheese in background at a market stand in Barranquilla.

== See also ==
- Colombian cuisine
- Queso costeño
- Arroz de lisa
- Butifarra Soledeñas
- Bollo
- Jocoque
