= Carimañola =

Central and South American meat pie in a burrito-shaped yuca fritter

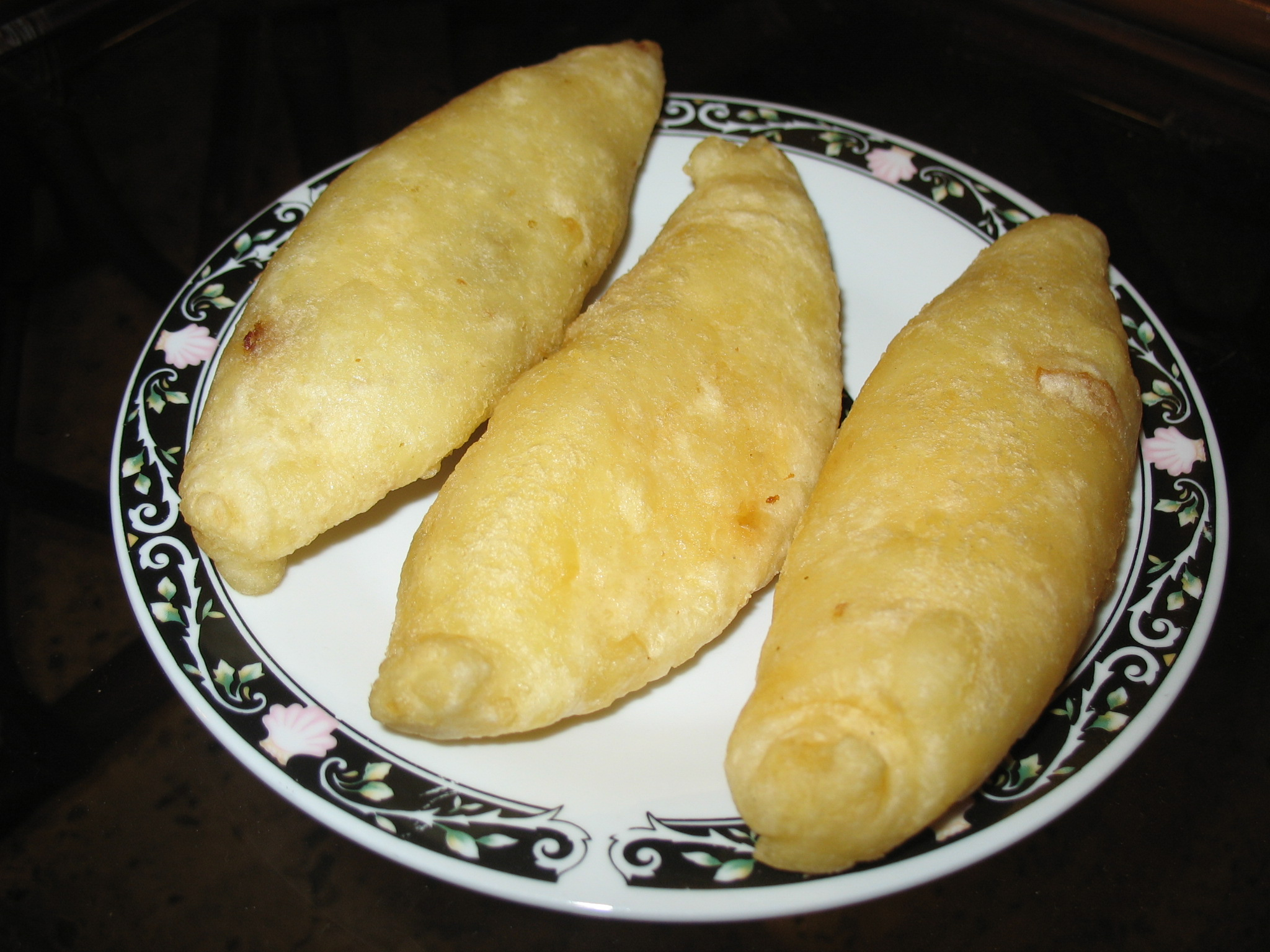
- A plate of carimañolas
- Type: Fritter
- Region or state: Central America and South America
- Associated cuisine: Colombia, Panama
- Main ingredients: Yuca

A carimañola, also called caribañolas, yuca fritters, or pastel de yuca, is a traditional fried food commonly found in the Caribbean coastal regions of Colombia and Panama. It is made primarily from yuca (cassava) dough, which is stuffed with ground beef, shredded chicken, or cheese, and then deep-fried until golden and crispy. Carimañolas are typically eaten as a breakfast item, snack, or appetizer.

== Preparation ==
The preparation of carimañolas begins with peeling and boiling fresh yuca until it becomes soft. Once cooked, the yuca is mashed into a dough-like consistency, with a small amount of butter, oil, or salt. The dough is then divided and shaped into small ovals or torpedo-like forms. In some variations, the filling may include sautéed onions, garlic, bell peppers, or cumin.

After stuffing, the dough is sealed and shaped before being deep-fried in hot oil until the outer layer becomes golden and crisp, while the interior remains soft. The final product is often served with suero or ají picante.

== Region and culture ==
Carimañolas are especially well-known in the Caribbean regions of Colombia, including the departments of Atlántico, Bolívar, Cordoba, and Sucre, where they are commonly sold by street vendors and served in restaurants.

== See also ==
- Colombian cuisine
- Empanada
- List of stuffed dishes
