= Costeño cheese =

Colombian Caribbean Region cheese

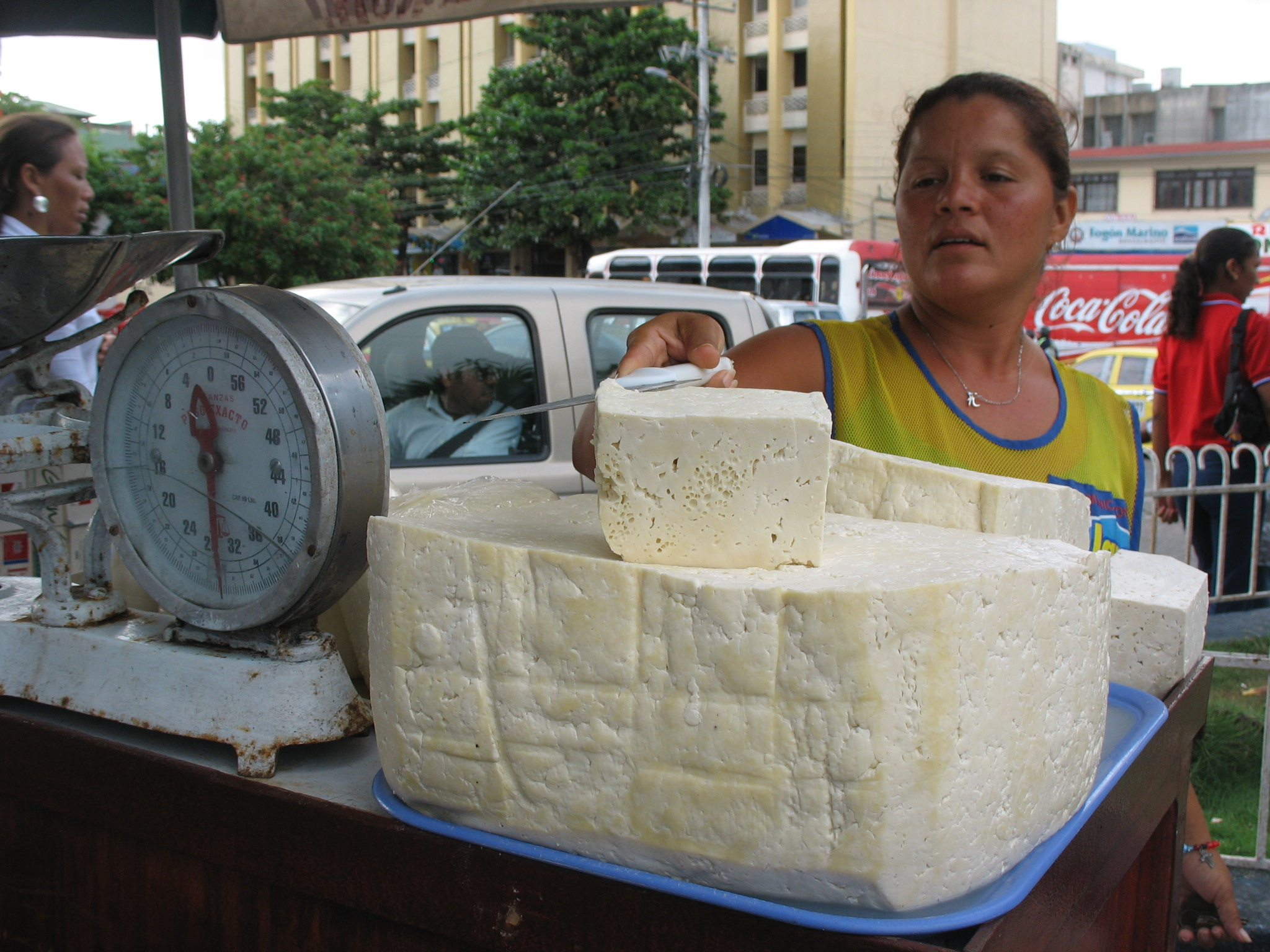
Costeño cheese stand in Barranquilla

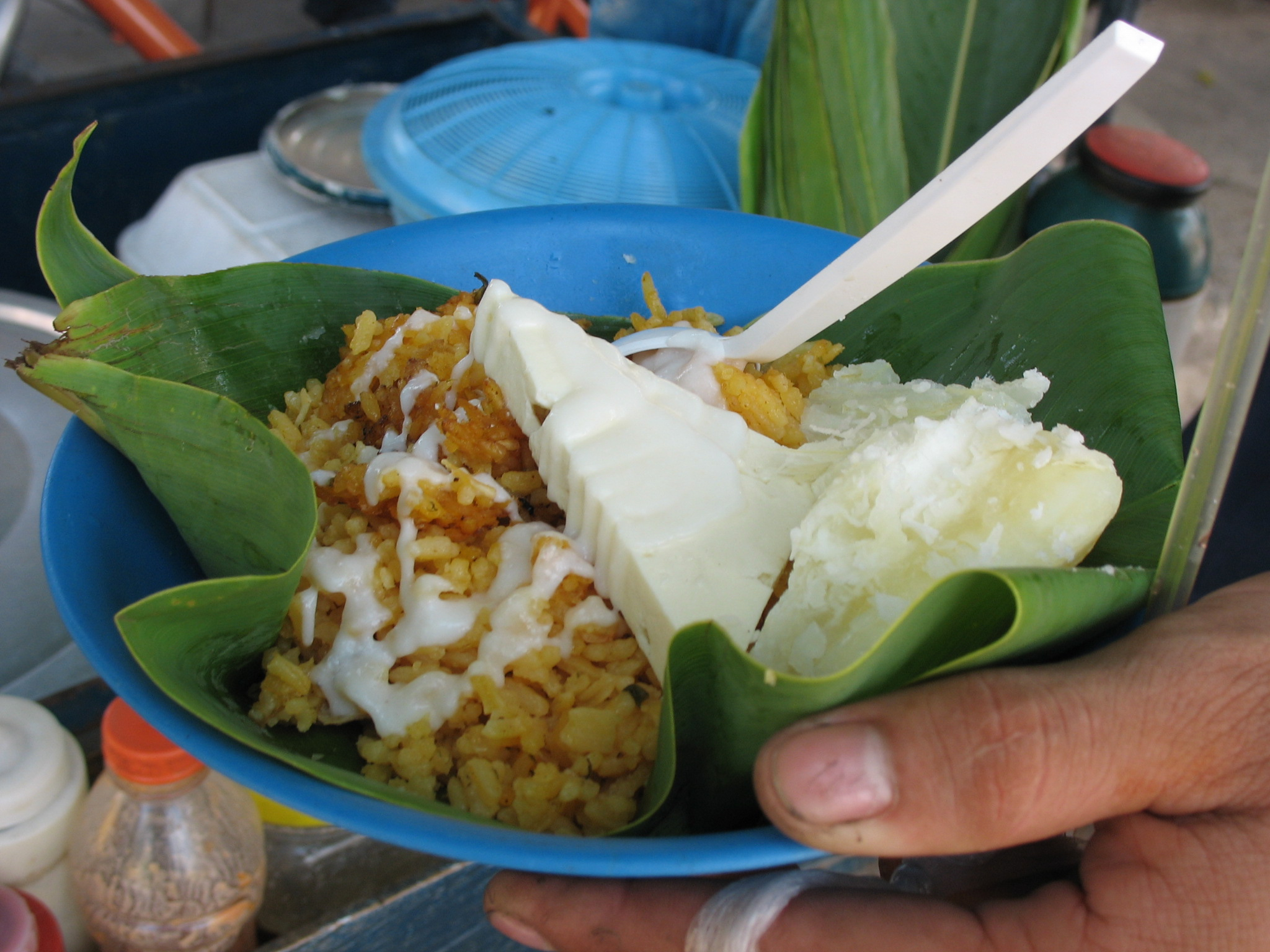
Arroz de lisa (mullet rice) from Barranquilla served in bijao leaf with cooked yuca, a triangle of costeño cheese and a sauce of suero atollabuey

Costeño cheese is a dairy product from the Colombian Caribbean region. It is fresh (or blanco), soft, and salty. Some harder varieties have more salt.

== Production ==
Raw milk is separated into solid curds and liquid whey by adding rennet, whey is separated, curds get hard, salt is added and then heated. A wooden bowl container called sereta and a press are used in the preparation.

== See also ==
- Bollo
- Butifarra Soledeñas
