= Butifarra Soledeñas =

Butifarra Soledeña
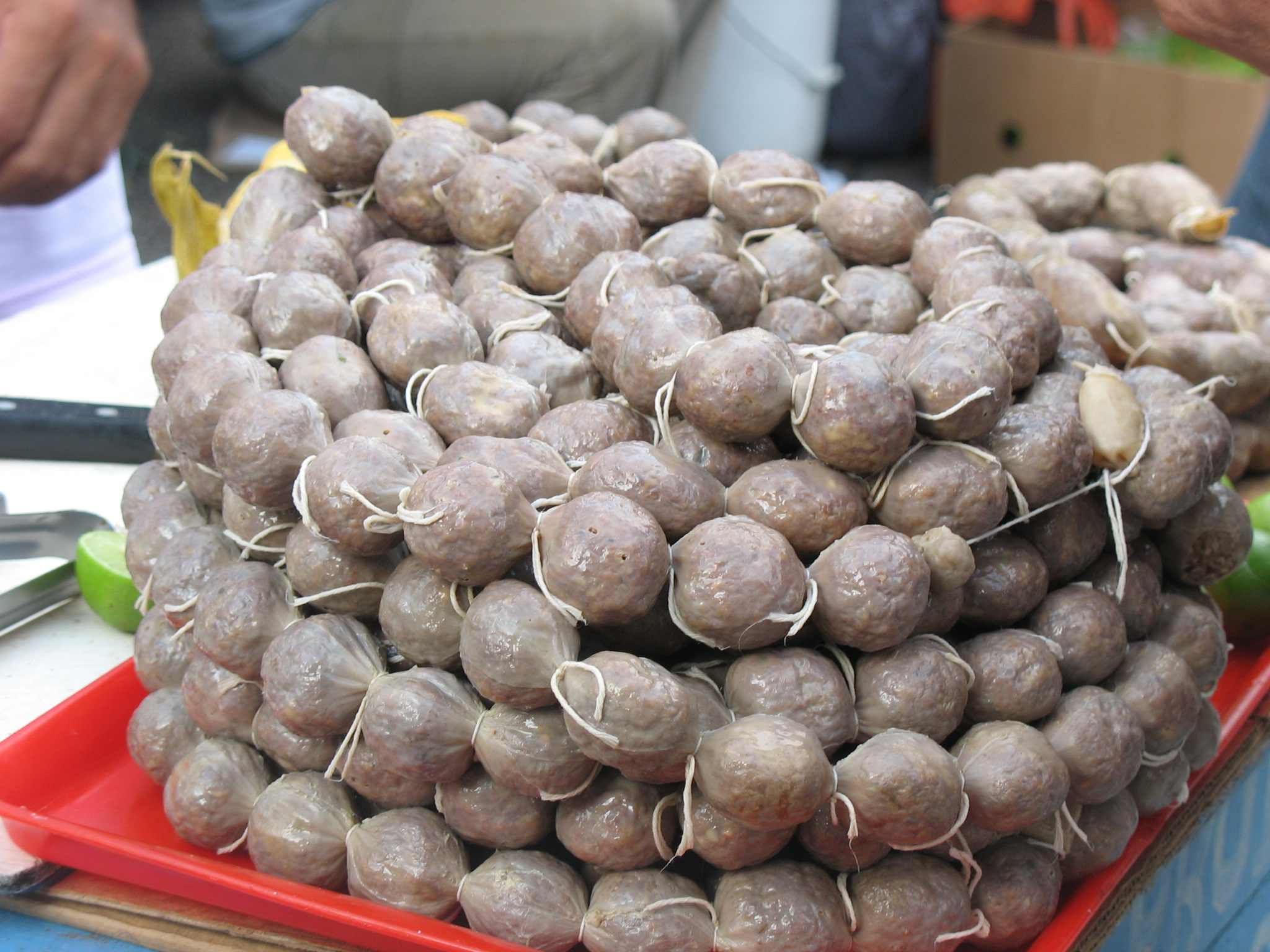
- Butifarras Soledeñas (sausages of Soledad, Atlántico)
- Type: Sausage
- Course: Main
- Place of origin: Colombia
- Region or state: Soledad, Atlántico
- Main ingredients: Meats

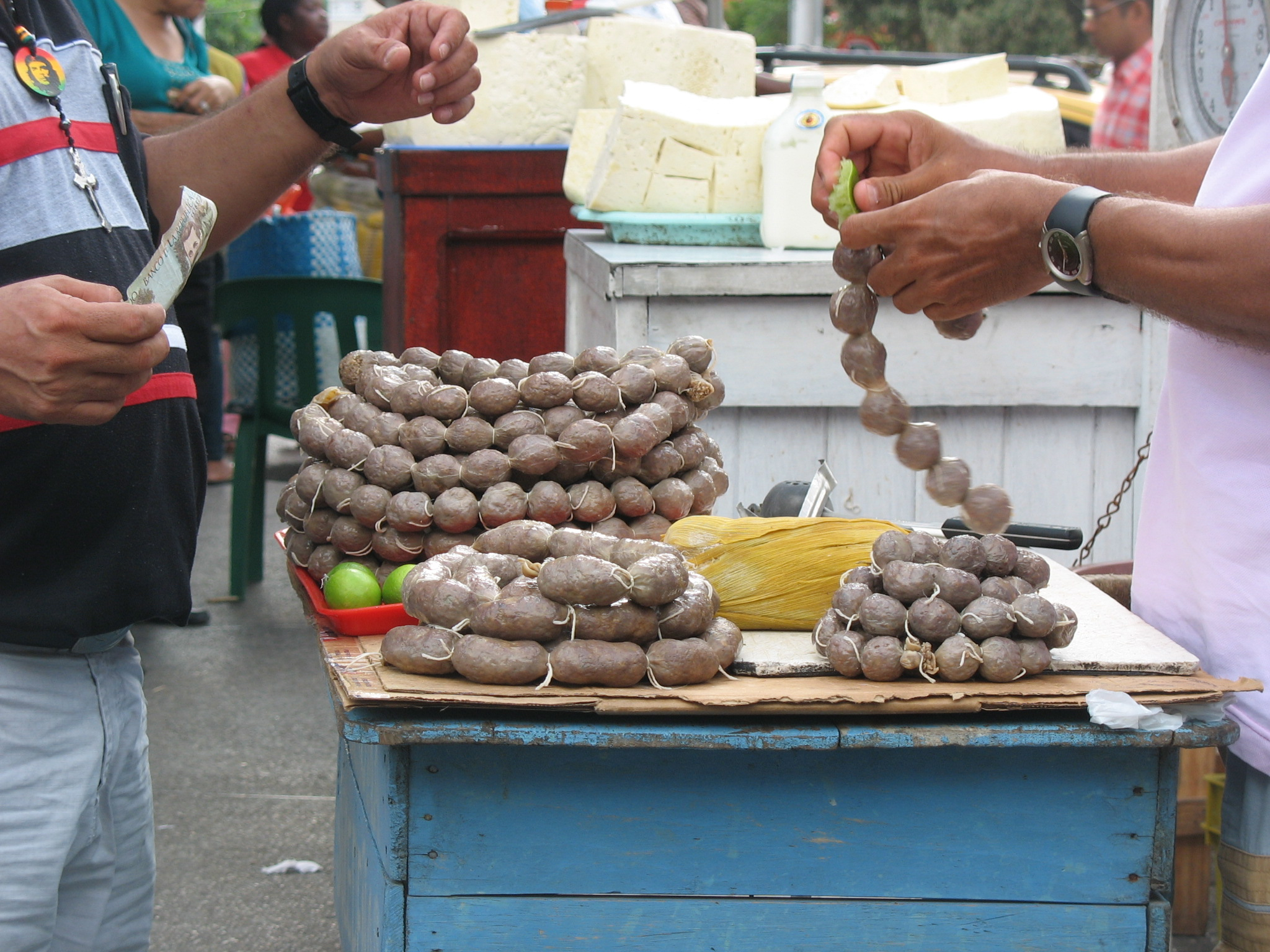
Barranquilla butifarras

Butifarra Soledeña (sausage of Soledad, Atlántico) is a type of botifarra that has developed into a regional specialty in Colombian cuisine. It is made from ground beef and pork with seasoning and spices. The meat is cut into pieces and boiled. The mixture is encased in intestine and tied off with string into sections. The lengths are boiled. Butifarras Soledeñas are hawked in the street by vendors calling out "buti, buti, buti" while drumming on the metal containers from which they are sold. Butifarras Soledeñas are often offered with freshly squeezed lime juice.

The South American version of butifarra is shorter and almost round. It is a speciality in Colombia in the town of Soledad and also in Barranquilla. Butifarra is eaten with bollo of yuca and lime juice. It is a celebrated tradition of the area. It can be eaten with the casing removed.

Butifarra is a borrowing from the Catalan language, of somewhat obscure origin, although it most likely derives from the Late Latin word buttis "barrel".

== See also ==
- Arroz de lisa
- List of sausages
- Queso costeño
- Suero atollabuey
