= Panamanian cuisine =

Culinary traditions of Panama

Panamanian cuisine is a mix of Spanish, Indigenous, and African techniques, dishes, and ingredients, reflecting its diverse population. Since Panama is a land bridge between two continents, it has a large variety of tropical fruits, vegetables and herbs that are used in native cooking.

Common ingredients in Panamanian food are maize, rice, wheat flour, plantains, yuca (cassava), beef, chicken, pork and seafood.

== Dishes ==
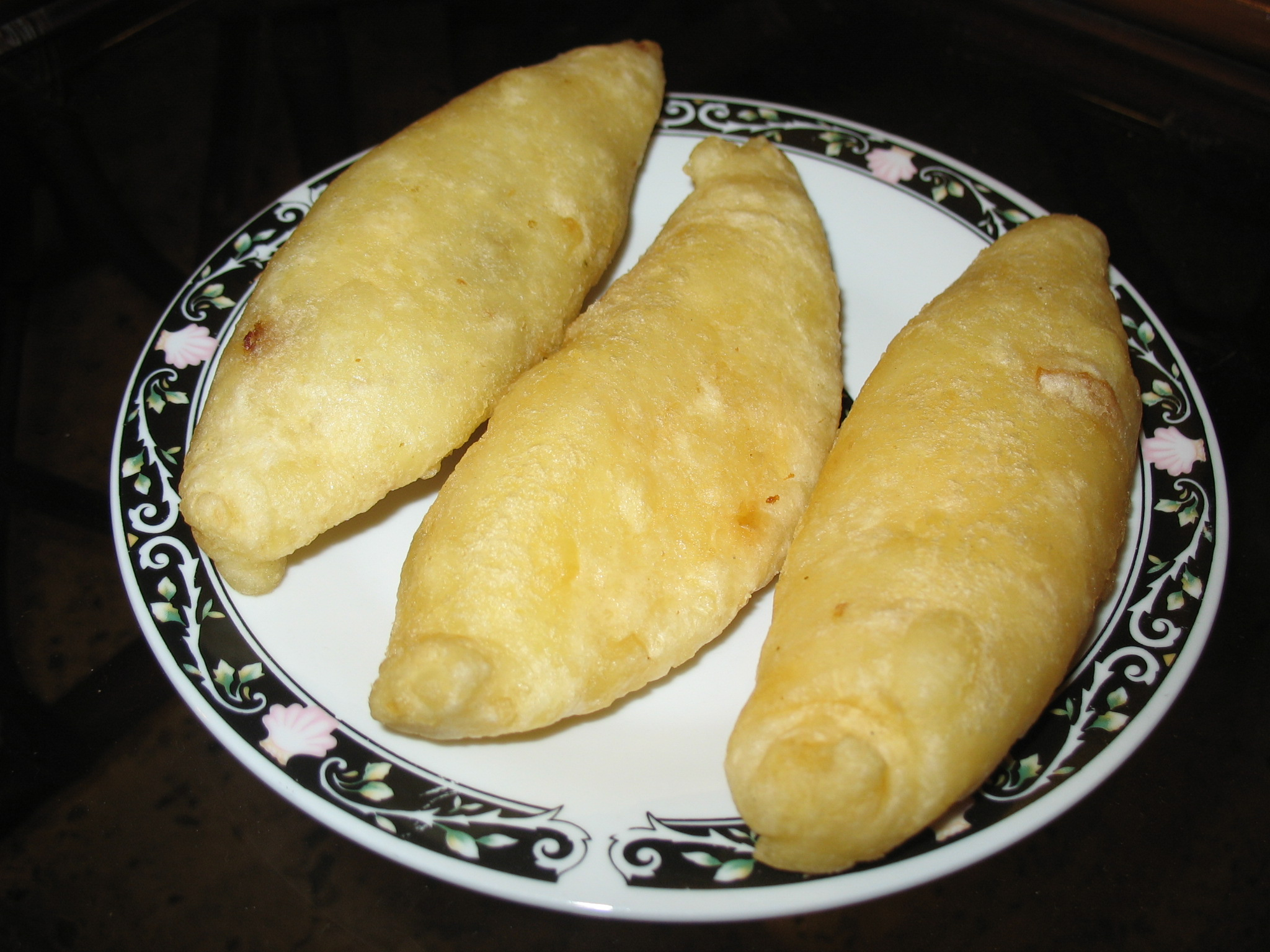
Carimañolas

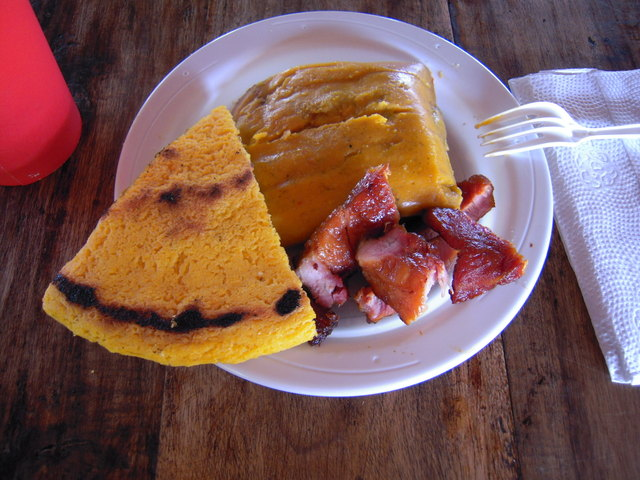
The corn-based tortilla de maiz viejo

Corn-based dishes come from the kernel, cooked in water and then ground in order to obtain a dough (as opposed to using corn flour to obtain the dough). Fresh corn is also used in some dishes. Due to the multicultural background of the Panamanians, many of its dishes are heavily influenced by the cuisine of other Latin American countries and also the Caribbean as well as European. Some of the main meals, dishes and specialties include:

- Almojábanos – S-shaped corn fritters
- Arroz con camarones y coco – rice with shrimp and coconut milk
- Arroz con chorizo y ajíes dulces
- Arroz con pollo
- Arroz con puerco y vegetales
- Arroz verde
- Bistec de higado – liver steak
- Bistec picado – chopped beefsteak
- Bollos – corn dough wrapped in nahuala palm leaves, corn husk or plantain leaves and boiled. There are two main varieties: fresh corn bollos (bollos de maíz nuevo) and dry corn bollos. The dry corn type is sometimes flavored with butter, corn, or stuffed with beef, which is called bollo preñado (lit. 'pregnant bollo'). Bollos have been described as a type of tamale.
- Carne entomatada
- Carimañola – similar to an empanada, but made from yuca and stuffed with beef
- Ceviche – commonly made from corvina and tilapia
- Chorizo con vegetales
- Chuletas en salsa de piña
- Empanadas – made either from flour or corn, and stuffed with meats and/or vegetables, cheese, and sometimes sweet fillings, such as fruit marmalade or manjar blanco (dulce de leche)
- Ensalada de papas – potato salad, called ensalada de feria when beetroot is added
- Fried fish
- Gaucho soup
- Hojaldres (or hojaldras) – a type of fry-bread, similar to those found in other South American countries and known as "blach tostones"
- Lengua guisada – stewed beef tongue
- Mondongo a la culona – stewed beef tripe
- Palm tree flower – prepared like spaghetti
- Pernil de puerco al horno – roasted pork leg
- Plátano en tentacion – ripe plantain cooked in a sweet syrup
- Ropa vieja
- Salpicón de carne

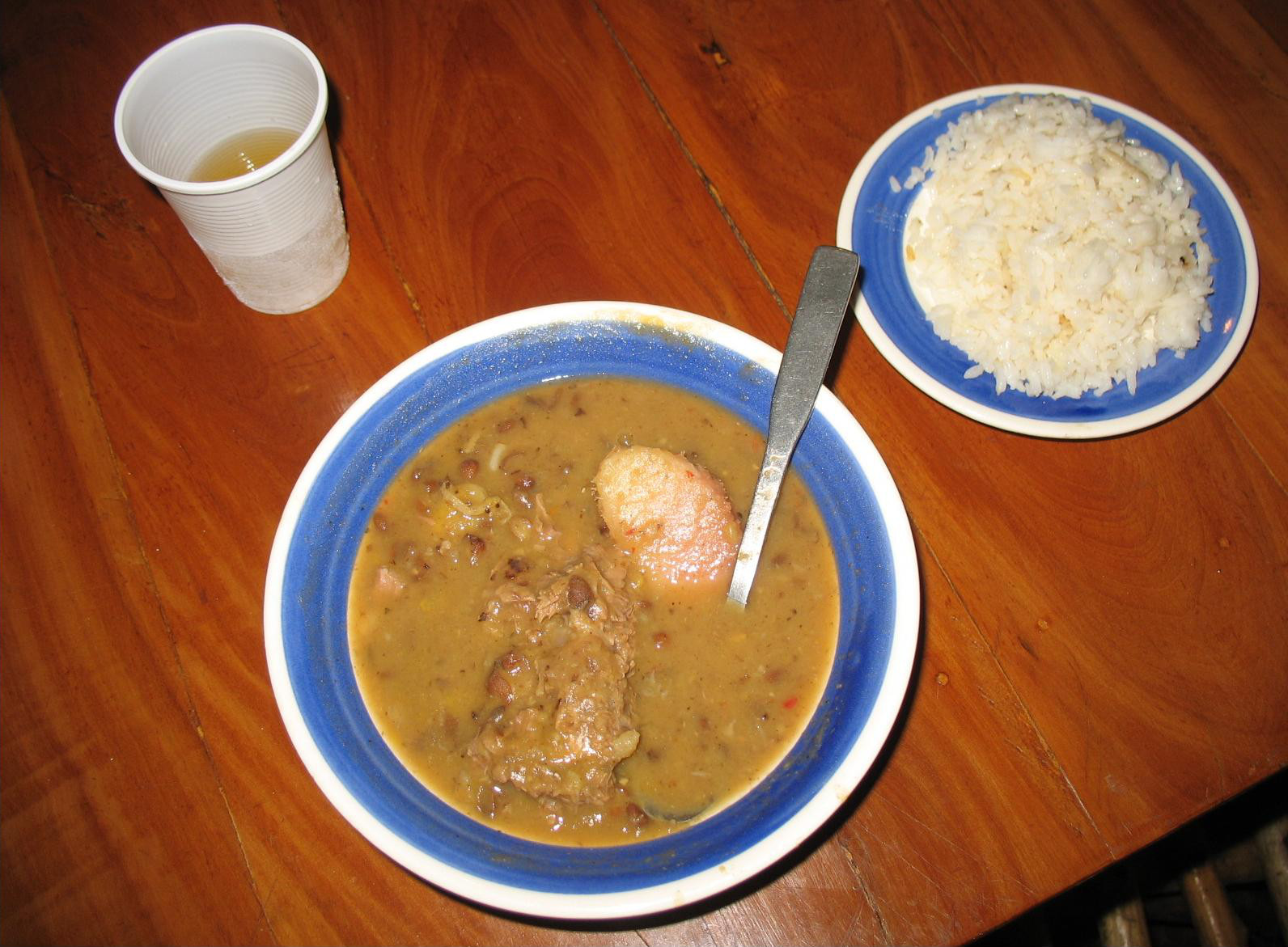
An example of sancocho

- Sancocho
- Tamal de olla
- Tamales
- Tortillas – these can be around ten to twelve inches in diameter (these are always cooked on a griddle), or smaller, around four inches (most of the time these are fried).
- Torrejitas (pastelitos) de maíz – fresh corn fritters
- Tortilla changa – a thick tortilla made out of fresh corn
- Tasajo – dried, sometimes smoked meat, usually beef, though the word refers mainly to the mode of curing rather than the type of meat

== Desserts ==
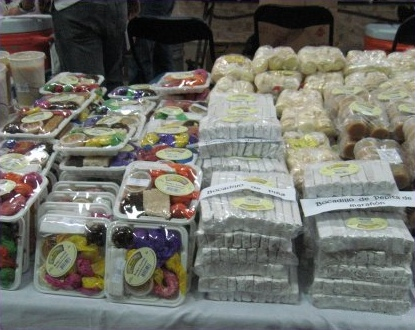
Panamanian sweets such as huevitos de leche, bocadillos, and manjar blancos

- Bocadillo – hardened square milk candies
- Bocado de la reina
- Bolitas de tamarindo – sugar balls with tamarind fruit
- Cabang
- Cocadas – coconut-rolled candy made from condensed milk
- Dulce de papaya
- Flan – rimmed pastry or sponge base containing a sweet or savoury filling
- Gollería – sweetened plantain fritter
- Huevitos de leche – balls of milk candy
- Mamallena
- Manjar or manjar blanco
- Mazamorra or pesada de nance
- Meringue – whipped eggs and sugar, baked
- Orejitas – ear-shaped sugar-coated flour
- Queque
- Seasonal pineapple – grown in Panama using a hybrid of Hawaiian pineapple; it is very sweet
- Sopa borracha
- Suspiros – wafers made from flour that release air when bitten
- Tres leches

== Drinks ==
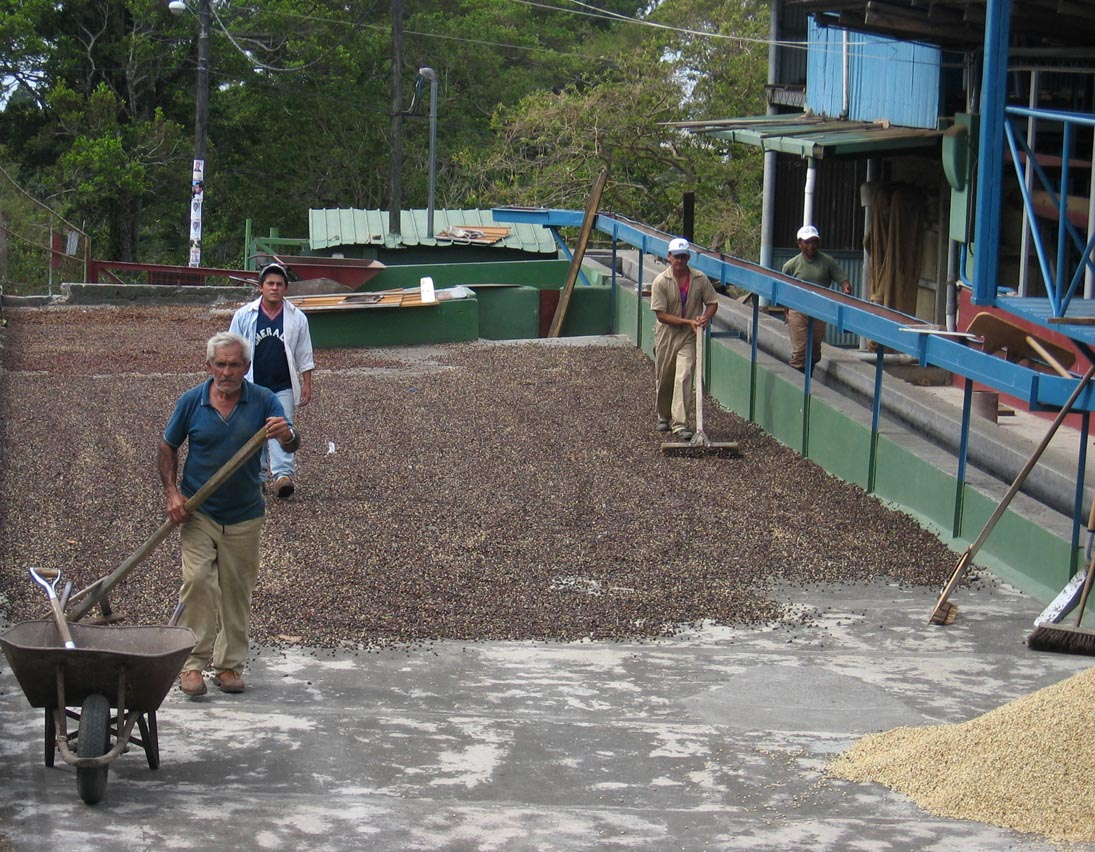
Traditional coffee drying at the Alto Boquete plant of Cafe Ruiz, Boquete, Panamá

In Panama there were bars that catered to local businessmen, tourists and gamblers and some that were frequented by U.S. military personnel. The latter mostly had a reputation as "shot and beer" dives with unknown names. One of these bars, Kresch's Place, published a drink recipe book. Several of the drinks are named after bases, submarines, forts, ships and other military institutions. The "U.S.S. 44 Special" was Old Tom gin, sloe gin and lime juice. The "U.S.S. Mallard" was aged rum (Panamanian, Venezuelan and Colombian), red vermouth, Bénédictine, absinthe, Angostura bitters garnished with lemon peel. The cover of the recipe book shows soldiers, sailors and an Army officer drinking.

- Beer
- Chicha
- Chicheme
- Coffee
- Fresh fruit juices (licuados or jugos naturales) – pineapple, passionfruit, papaya, orange, tree tomato, and others are prepared by blending fresh fruit and straining; typically heavily sweetened and optionally with condensed milk added
- Malteada – a malted eskimo-like milkshake without ice cream
- Resbaladera
- Ron ponche
- Saril – a drink containing sorrel sepals, ginger, cinnamon, cloves, sugar, water, and a splash of rum)
- Seco Herrerano

== Spices ==
- Achiote – common in Panamanian cuisine
- Ají chombo – a hot pepper grown in local regions

== Special occasions ==
=== Christmas ===
The traditional Panamanian dish for Christmas usually includes chicken tamales, arroz con pollo (rice with chicken), puerco asado, pernil, pavo (turkey), and relleno (stuffing). Bowls of fruits and fruitcake are set out on the tables along with the dishes. Along with these foods and dessert, a traditional drink is served called ron ponche (eggnog).
