= Botifarra =

Catalan sausage dish

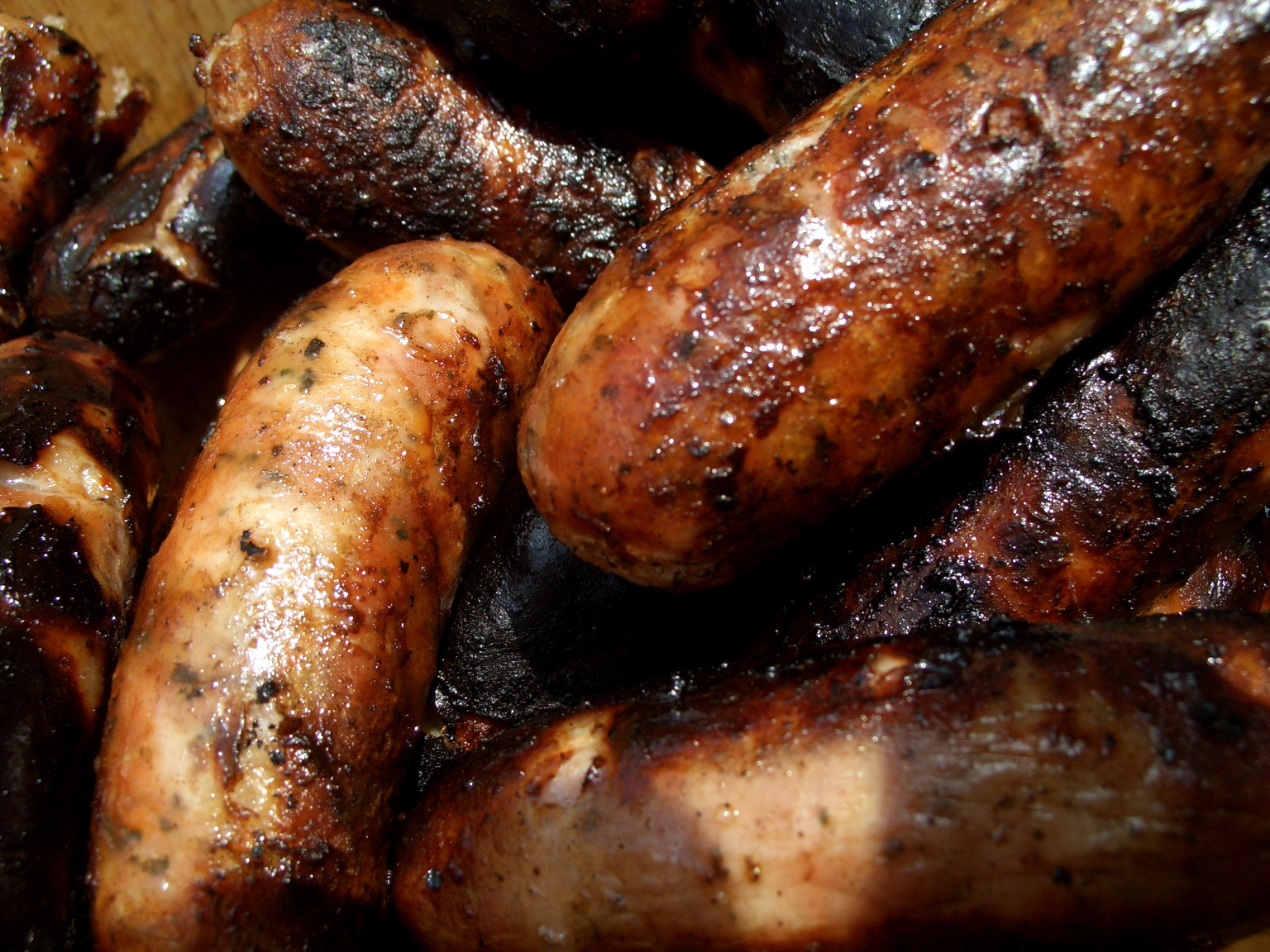
Grilled botifarra vermella

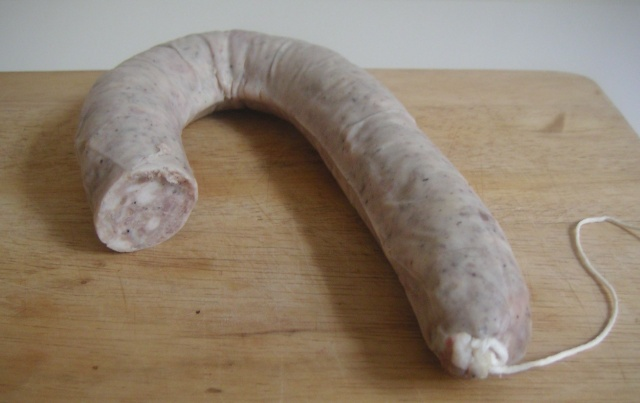
White botifarra

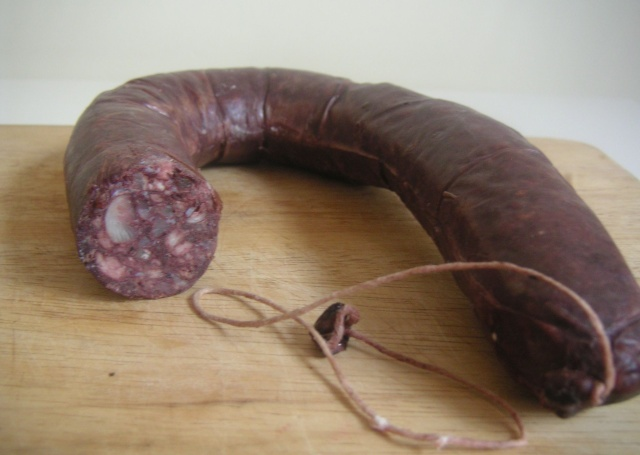
Black botifarra

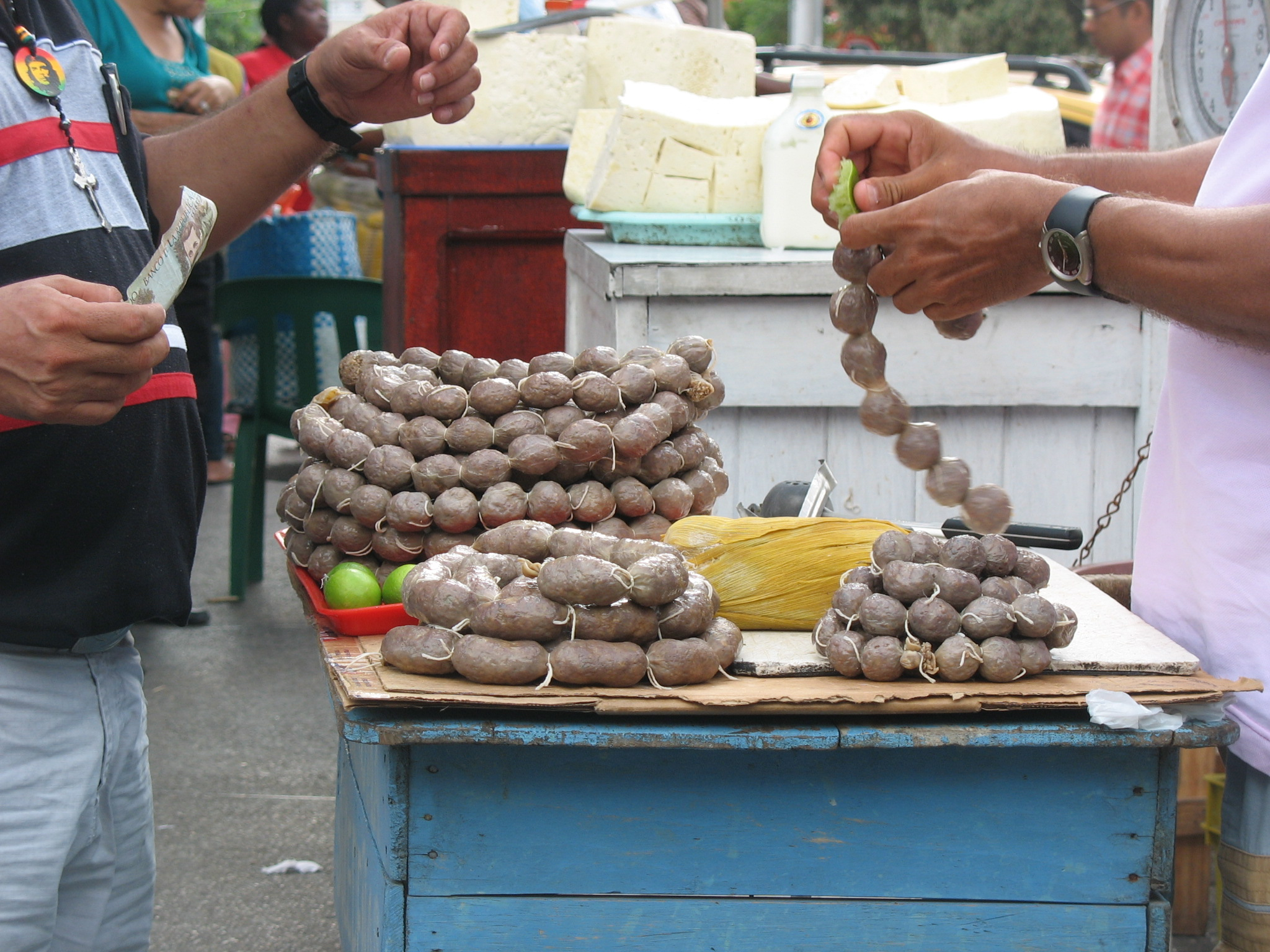
Barranquilla butifarras, butifarras soledeñas

Botifarra (Catalan: botifarra; Spanish: butifarra; French: boutifarre) is a type of sausage and one of the most important dishes of the Catalan cuisine.

Botifarra is based on ancient recipes, either the Roman sausage botulu or the lucanica, made of raw pork and spices, with variants today in Italy and in the Portuguese and Brazilian linguiça.

In Colombia, butifarras soledeñas are a popular tradition in Soledad, Atlántico.

== Varieties ==
Some of the most representative types are:

- Raw botifarra, botifarra vermella, botifarra crua, or roget. It is also known as llonganissa in many places of the Eastern Spain. This botifarra is usually grilled or barbecued.
- Black botifarra, botifarra negra or negret, containing boiled pork blood in the mixture
- Botifarra catalana, large botifarra similar to cooked ham. It may contain truffles.
- Botifarra d'ou (lit. 'botifarra with egg'), containing egg in the mixture, typically eaten on Fat Thursday (dijous gras)
- White botifarra, botifarra blanca or blanquet. Its main ingredient is lean meat (carn magra). It does not contain any blood in its mixture.
- Botifarra d'arròs (lit. 'botifarra of rice'), containing boiled rice together with meat and spices
- Bisbe (meaning 'bishop') and bull, as well as bisbot negre and bull negre, are thick blood botifarra varieties made with different sections of tripe. Both bisbe and black botifarra are versions of black pudding.

== Dishes with botifarra ==
Usually white botifarra and black botifarra do not need to be cooked, but they are sometimes boiled as an ingredient of escudella i carn d'olla, a traditional dish made by boiling vegetables and meat; as well as in the Catalan way of cooking fava beans.

Grilled botifarra served with white beans (Catalan: botifarra amb seques or botifarra amb mongetes) is a typical Catalan dish.

== In Latin America ==
In South America cooked botifarra of many types are known as butifarra. In the coast of Colombia, butifarra is a dried, shorter, almost round version of the sausage eaten with bollo of yuca and lime juice. In Argentina and Uruguay, butifarra is a very fatty, tender and whitish sausage much more like a cased pate, rioplatense butifarra is made with finely minced pork fat and meat that is cased in a soft sausage casing and boiled. In Paraguay, butifarra is a finely minced fatty chorizo that is commonly prepared in asado.

Butifarra is popular in El Salvador and also known to be found in Bolivia and Mexico. In Tabasco, Mexico, la butifarra is a short sausage that is very popular with street vendors, made of seasoned mixed ground beef and pork, deep-fried and usually served with a stack of halved tortillas on each side.

=== Other uses of the term ===
In Peruvian cuisine, the word butifarra is used for a particular kind of ham sandwich. The Peruvian butifarra sandwich is prepared with jamon del país, which is a regional type of ham, and not a botifarra at all.

== See also ==
Media related to Botifarres at Wikimedia Commons

- List of sausages
