= Bijao =

Bijao is a common name for several plants and may refer to:

- Calathea lutea
- Heliconia bihai
- Renealmia occidentalis
- Stromanthe jacquinii
