= Bollo =

Latin-American corn bun

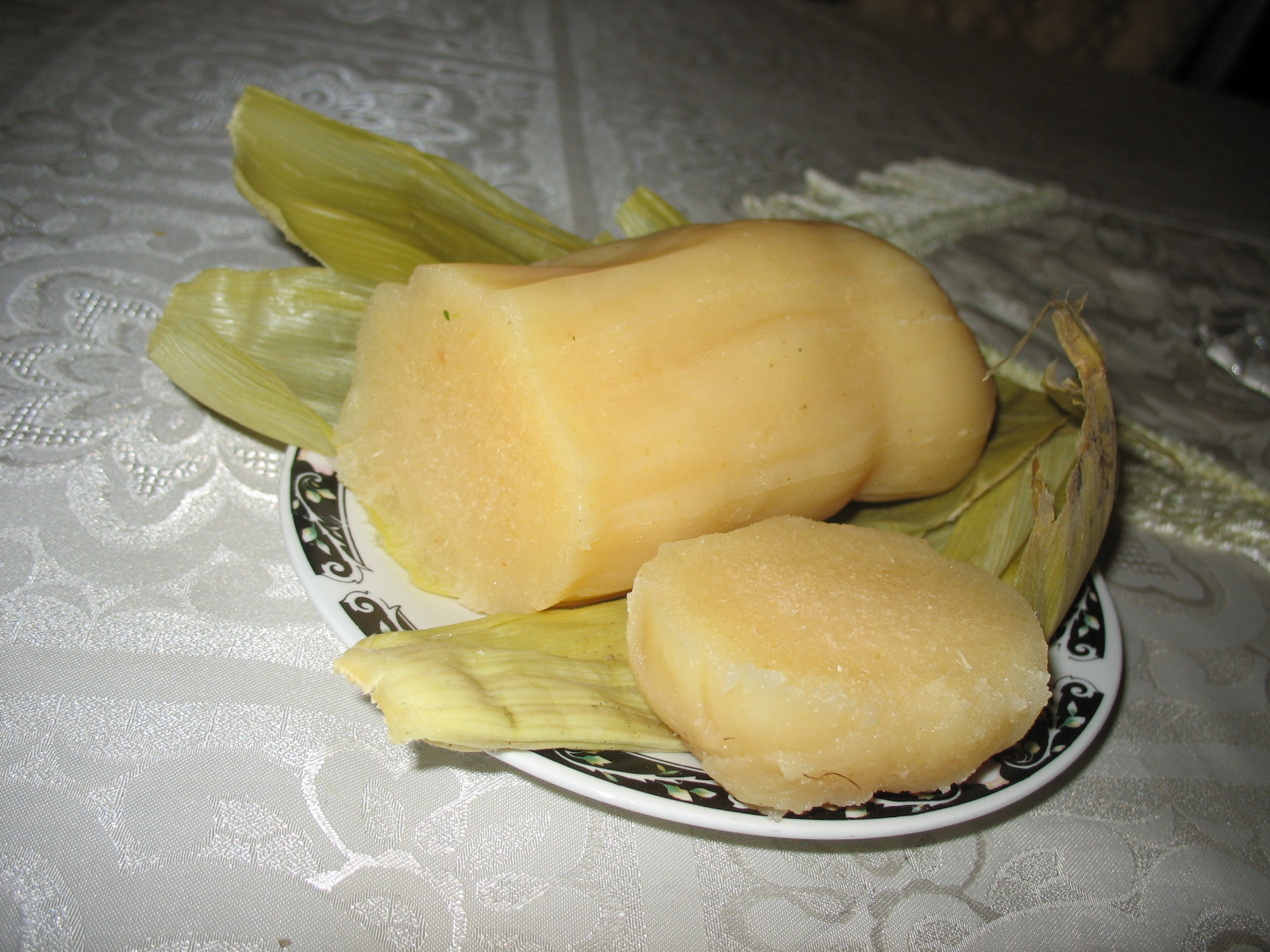
- Yuca bollo
- Type: Bread
- Place of origin: Colombia Panama
- Region or state: Latin America
- Associated cuisine: Colombia, Panama, Cuba, Ecuador, Spain, Portugal
- Main ingredients: Yuca, corn or potatoes

A bollo is a bun, common in Latin America, made from corn, yuca, or potato. Variations are found in the cuisines of Colombia, Ecuador, and Panama. Corn and yuca bollos are an indigenous food of the Caribbean coast of Colombia and Panama, where they are boiled in leaves. This preparation is similar to the humita of the Andes, the hallaquita of Venezuela and the pamonha of Brazil.

In Colombia, bollos are sold by street vendors along the Colombian coast, as well as in stores and supermarkets. They are primarily served for breakfast as an accompaniment to cheese.

Panamanian bollo has been described as a type of tamale.

In Spain and Portugal, bollo is typically a sweet or savory bun, sometimes spiced with anise.

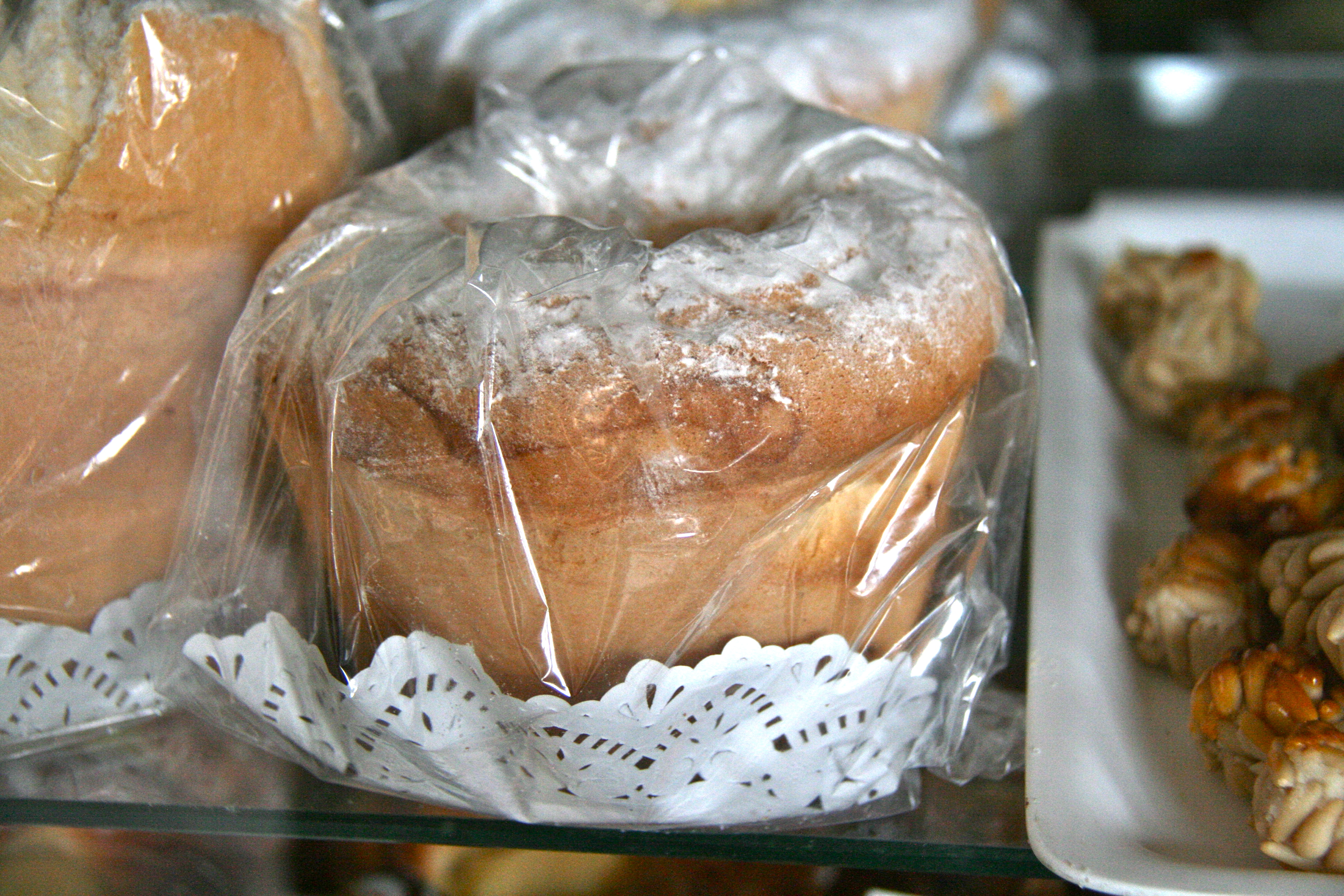
Bollo Maimón-Salamanca

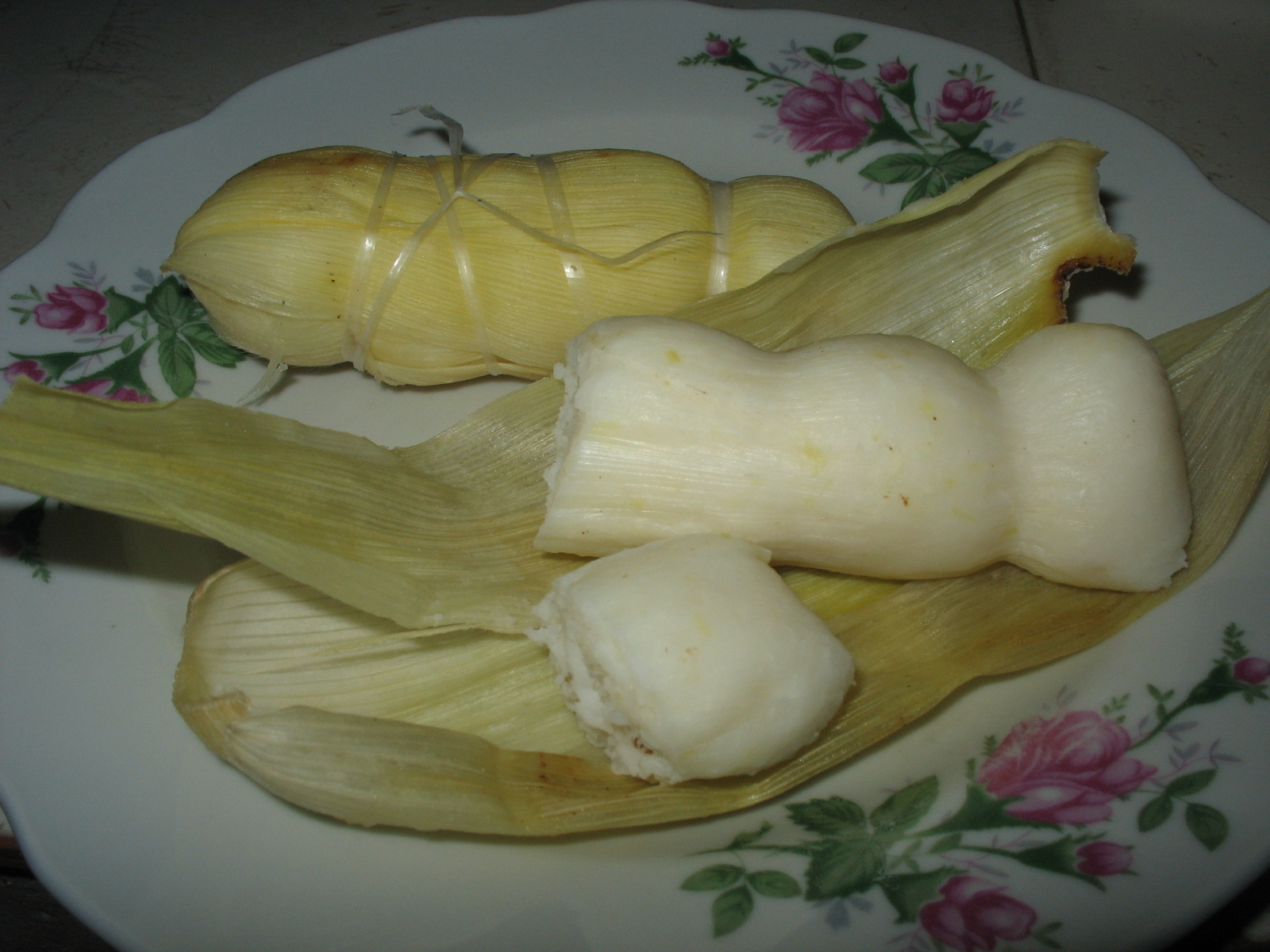
Bollo

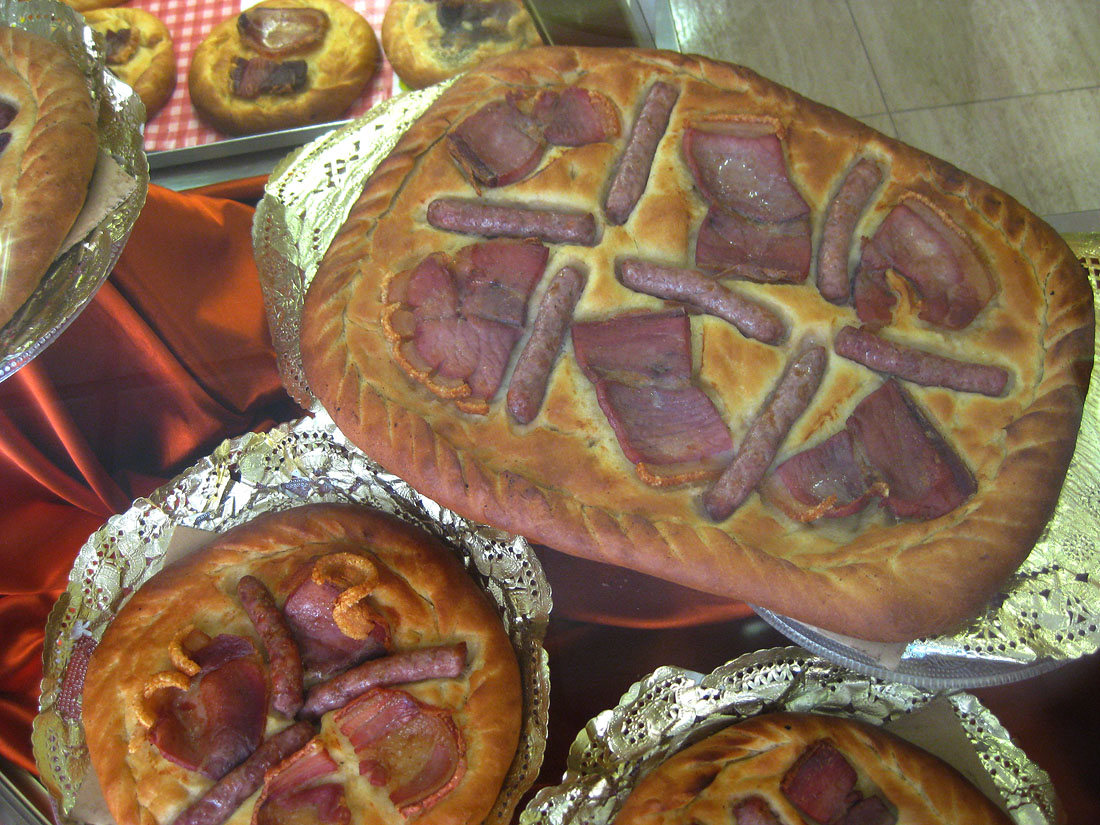
Bollos Requena

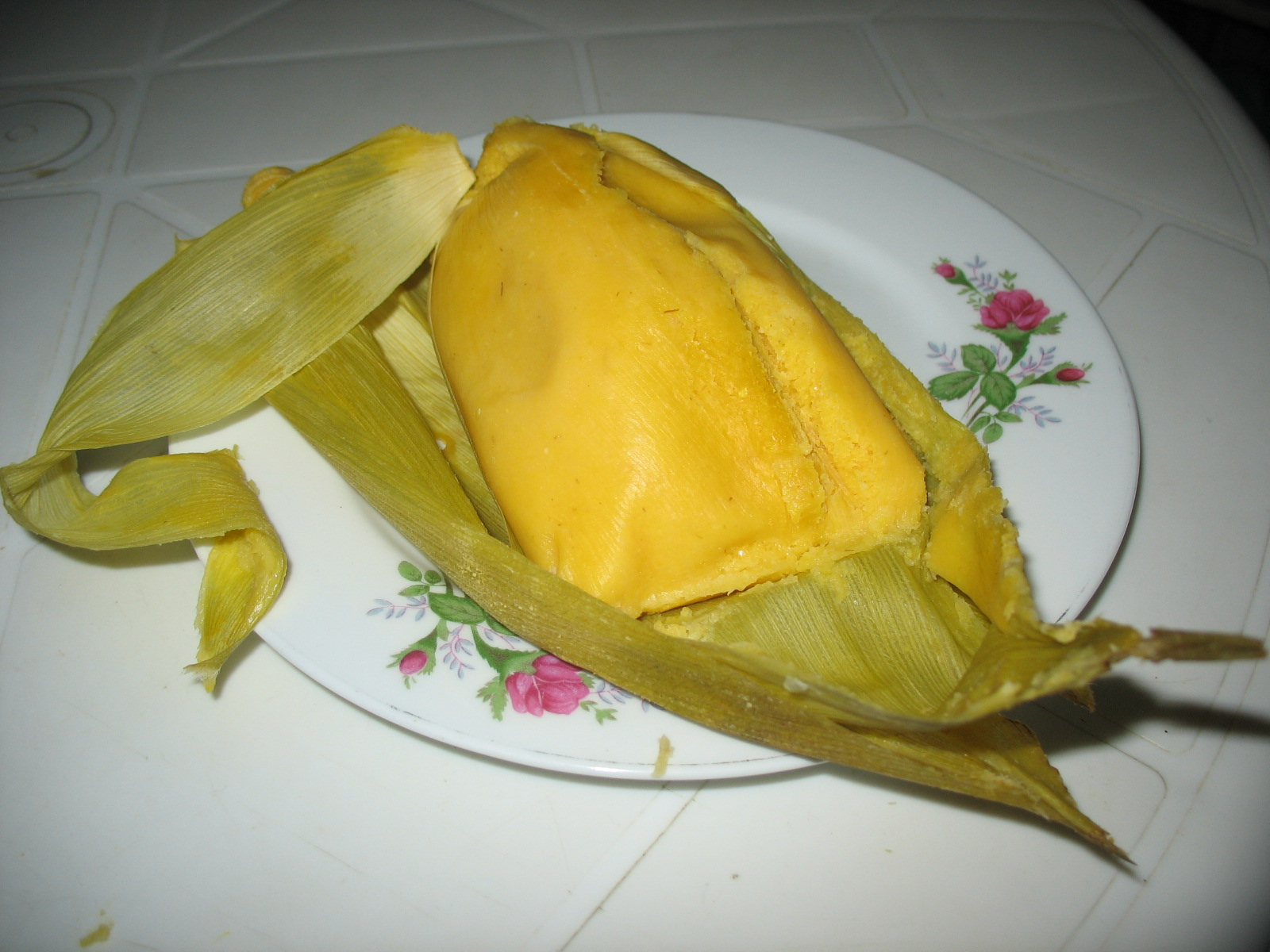
Bollo of Mazorca

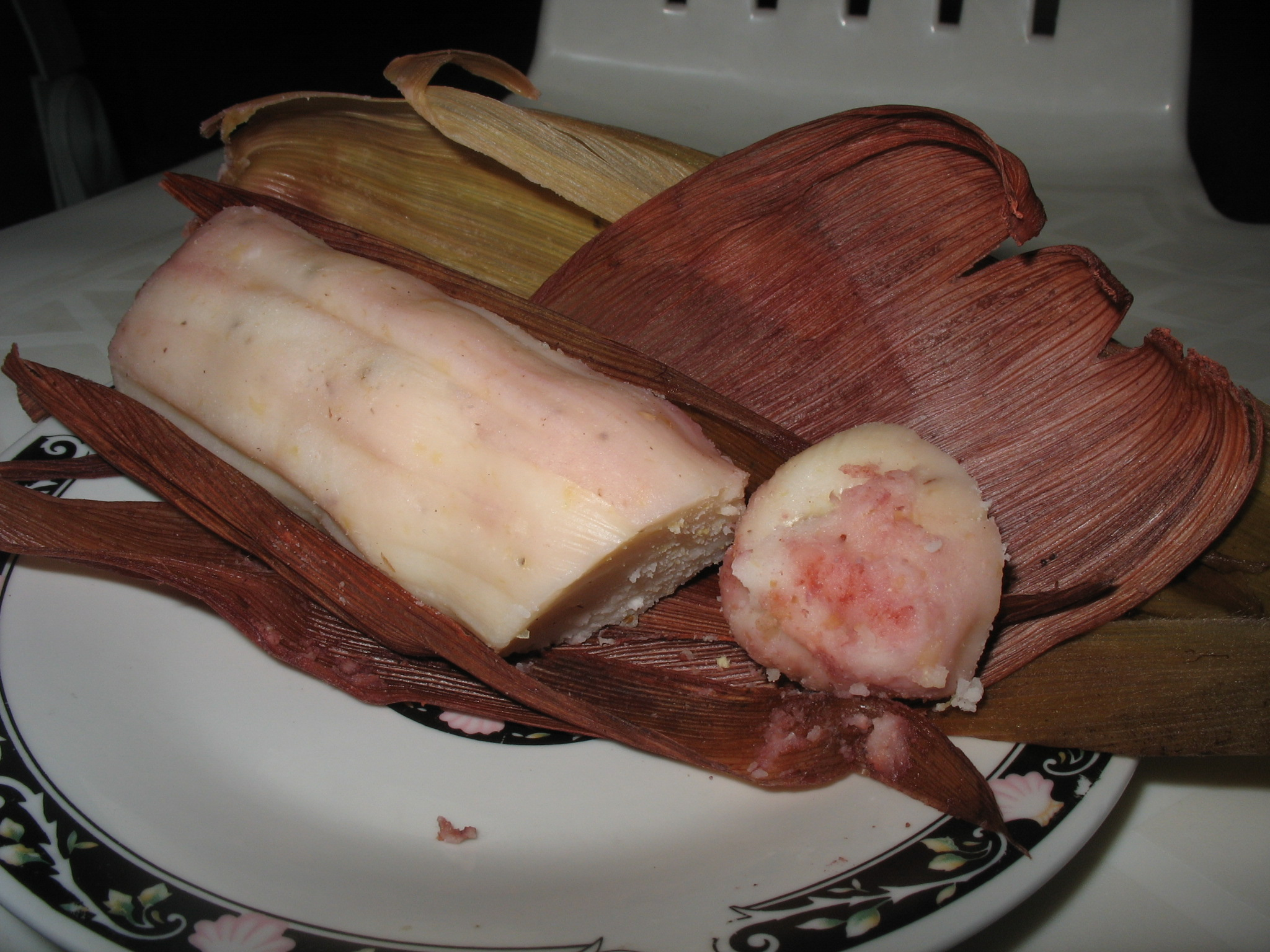
Angelito bollo

== See also ==
- List of maize dishes
