= La Paz =

Seat of government of Bolivia

- Seat of Government
- Nuestra Señora de La Paz
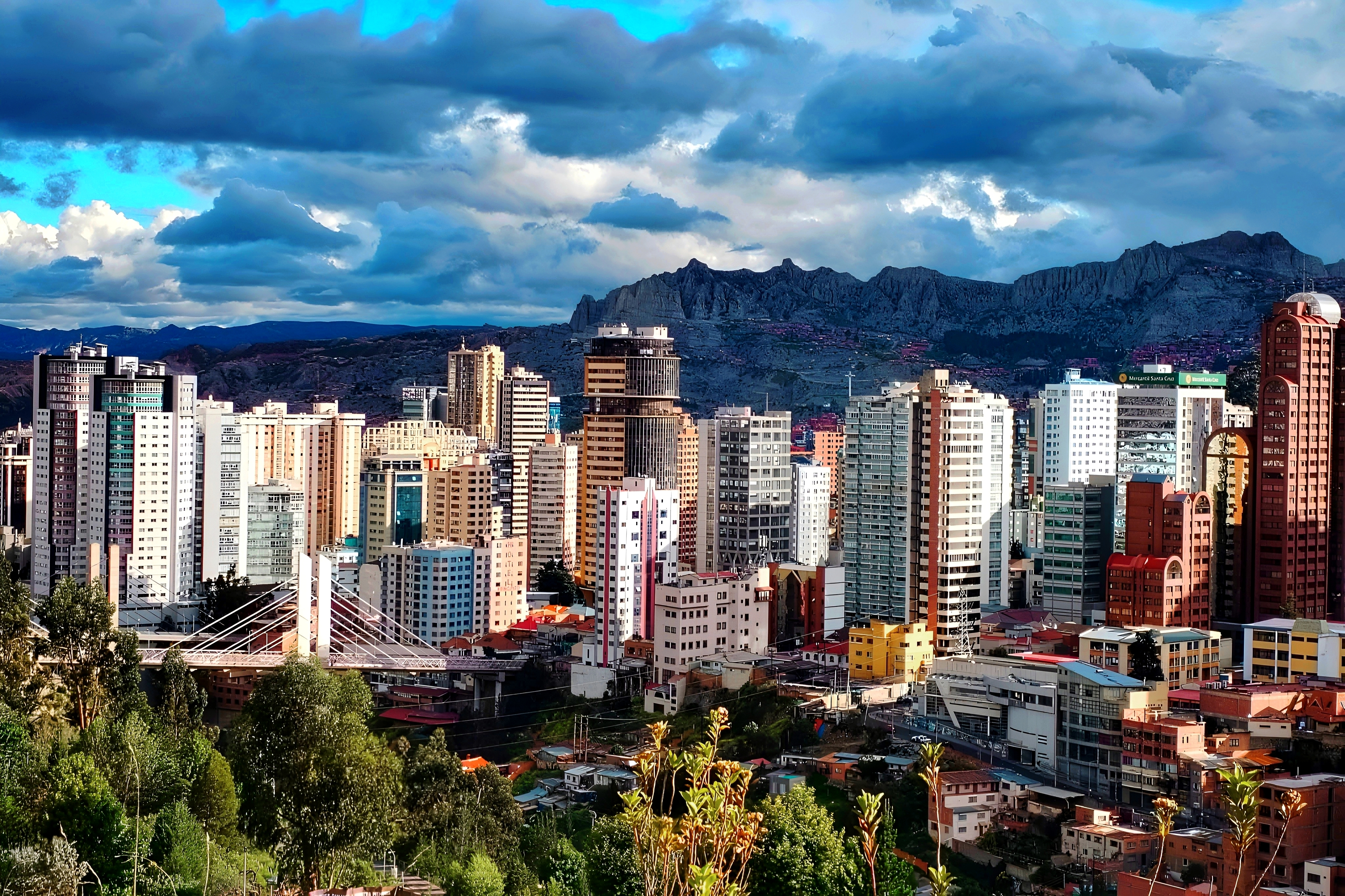
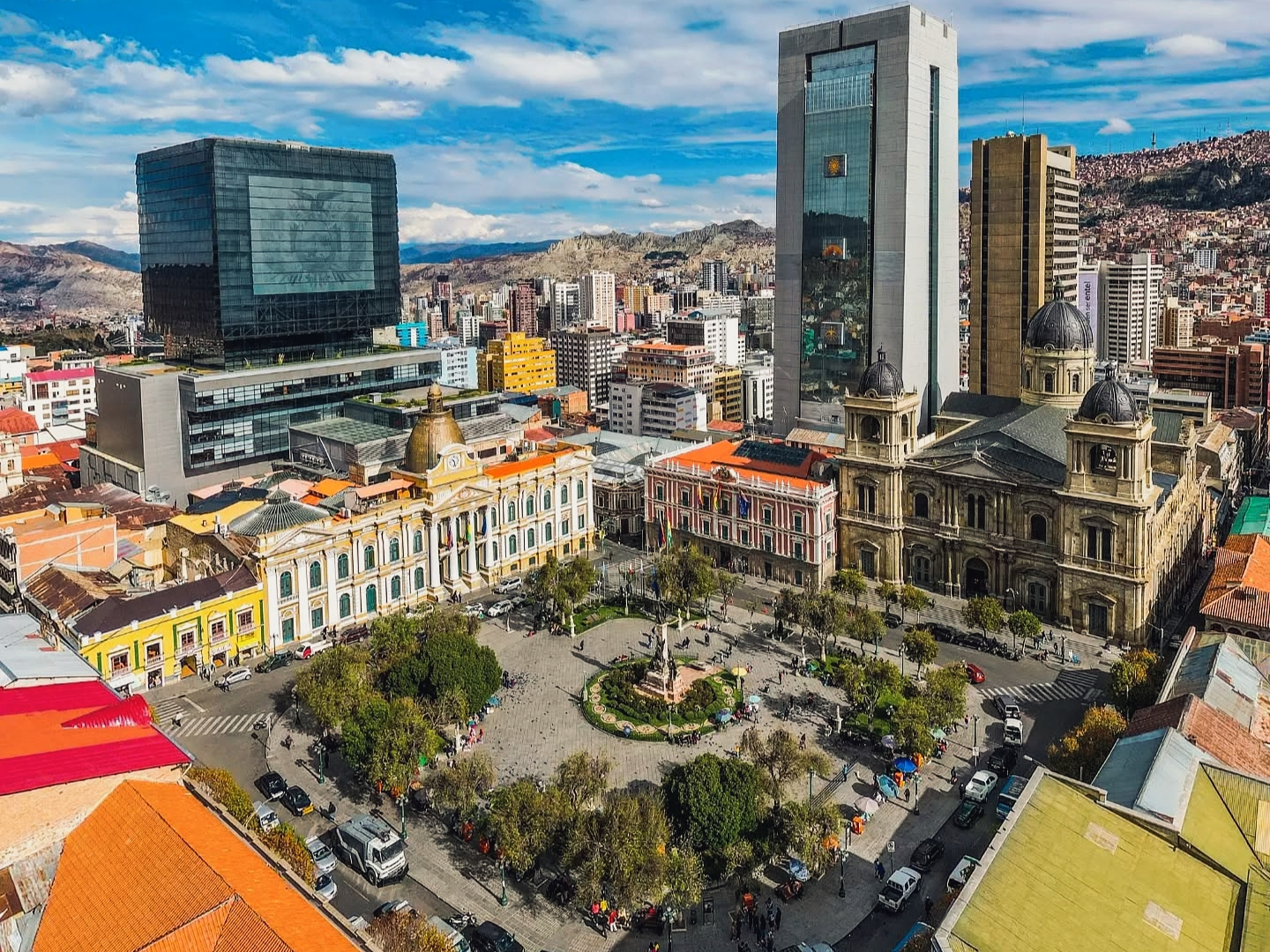
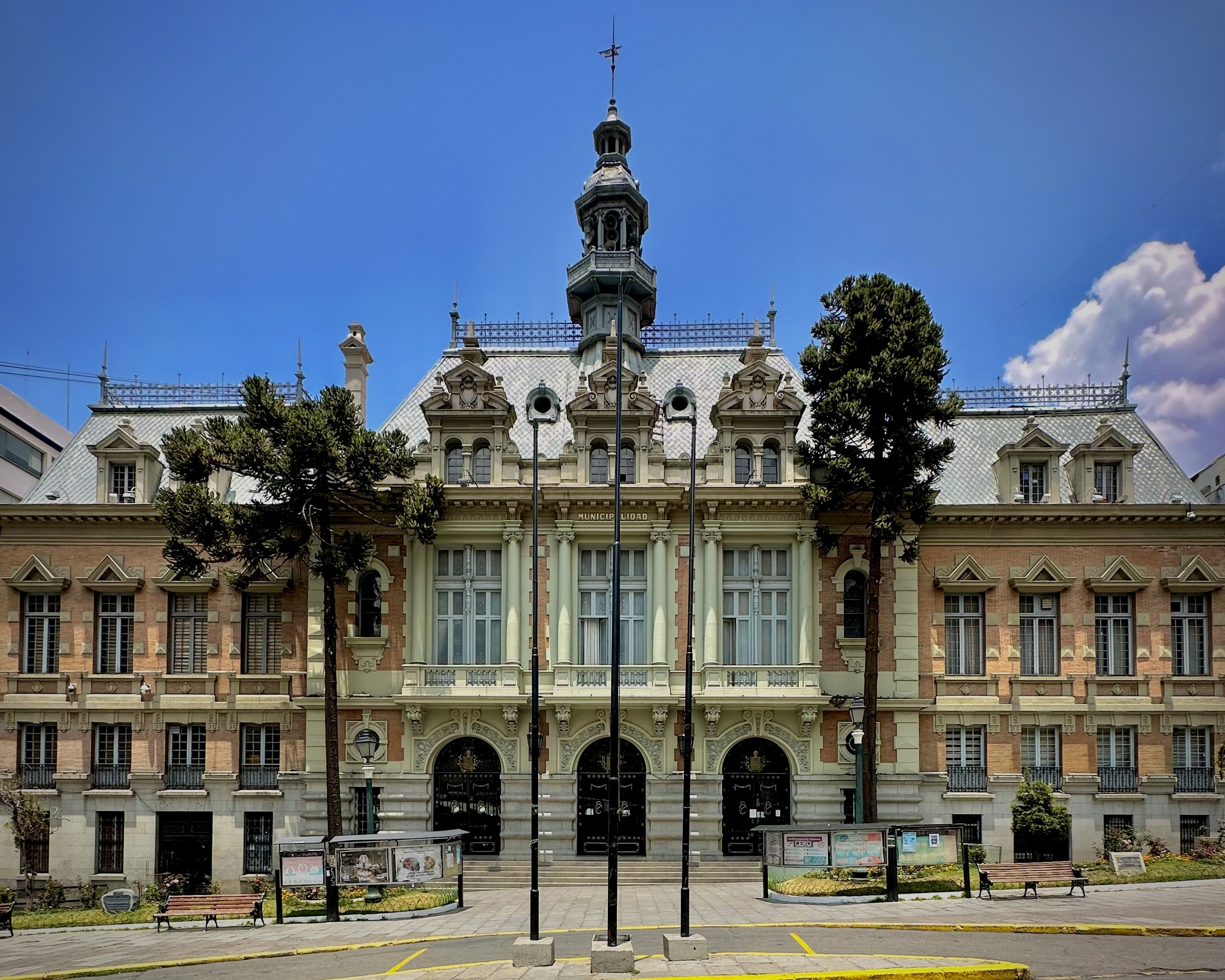
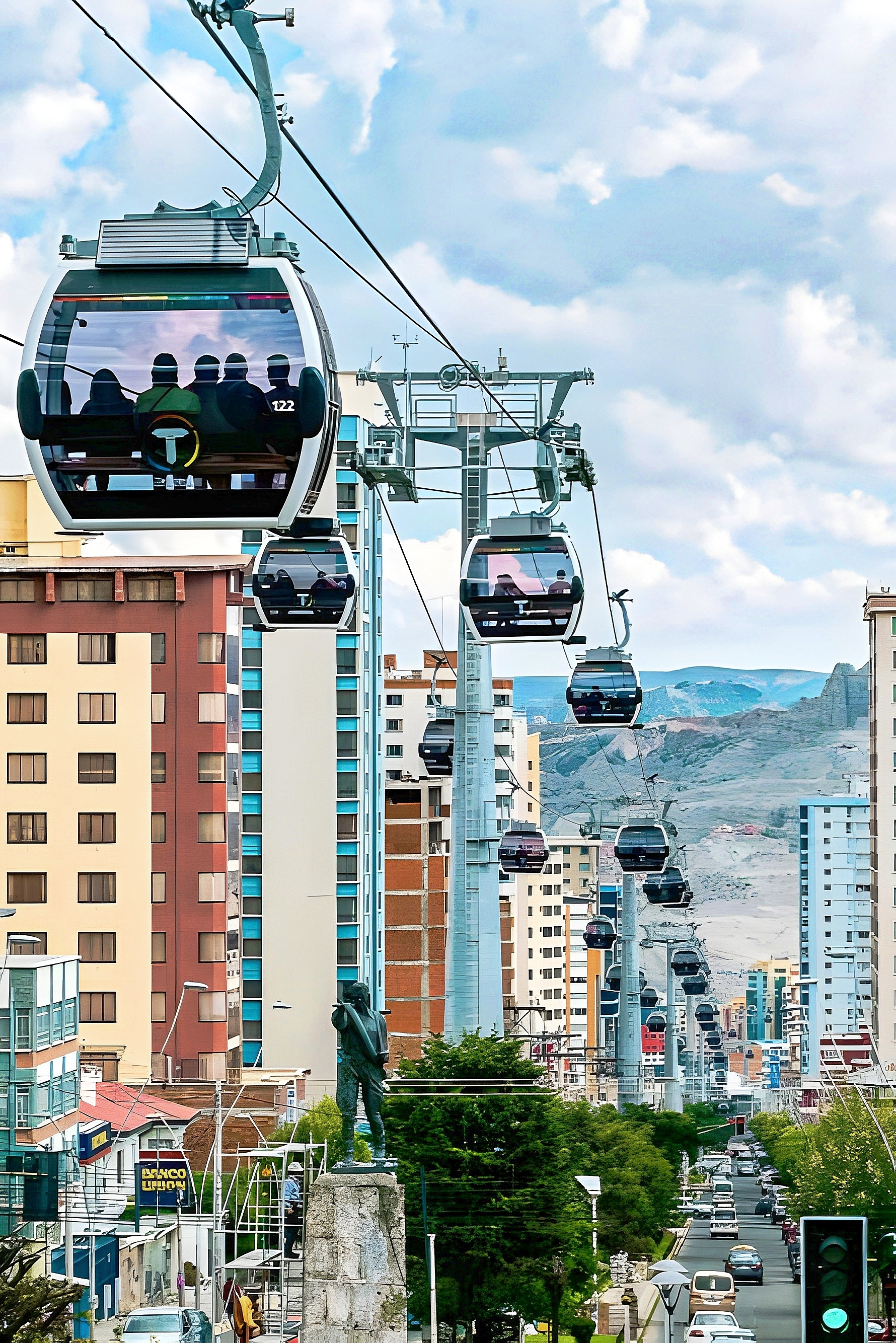
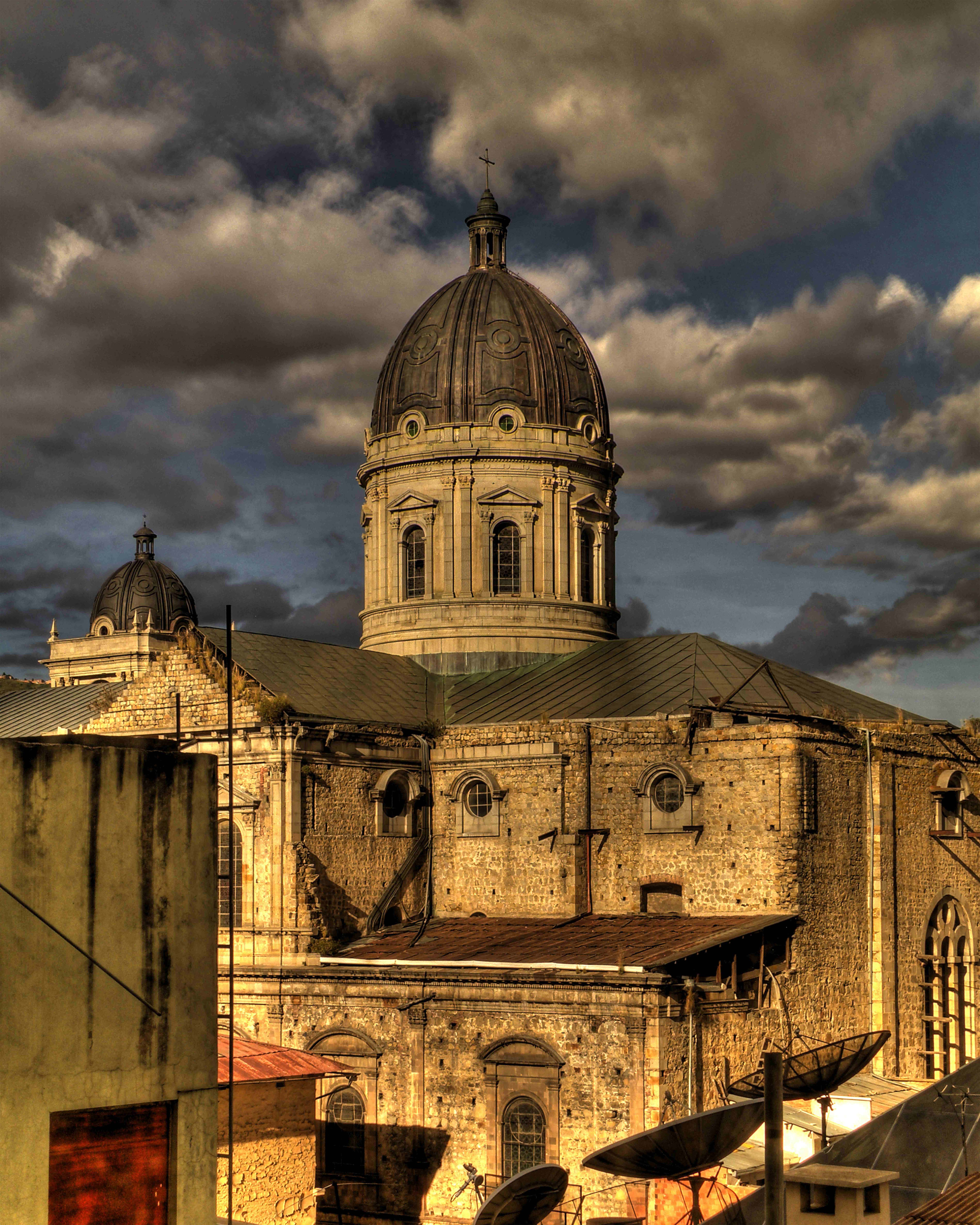
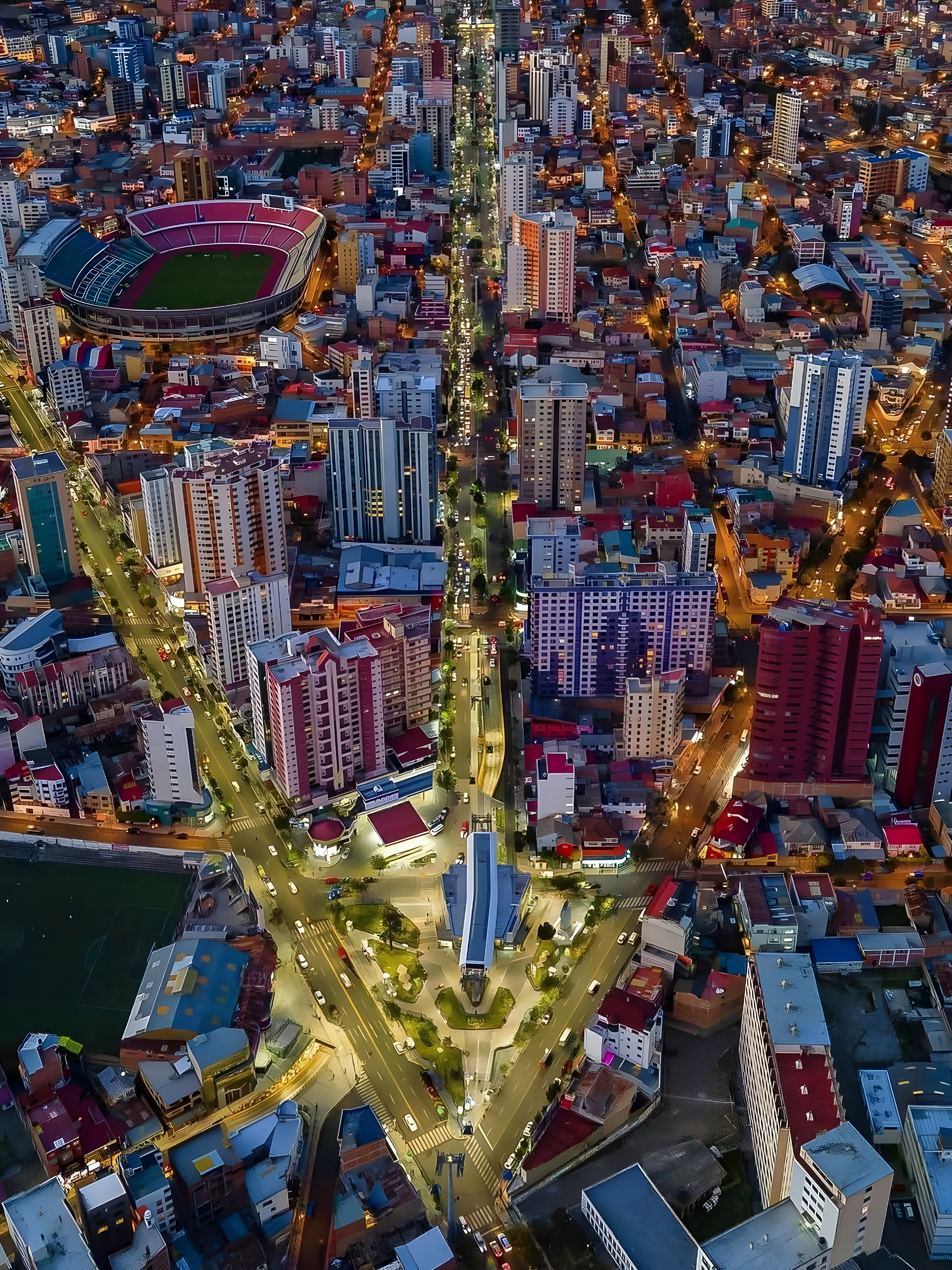
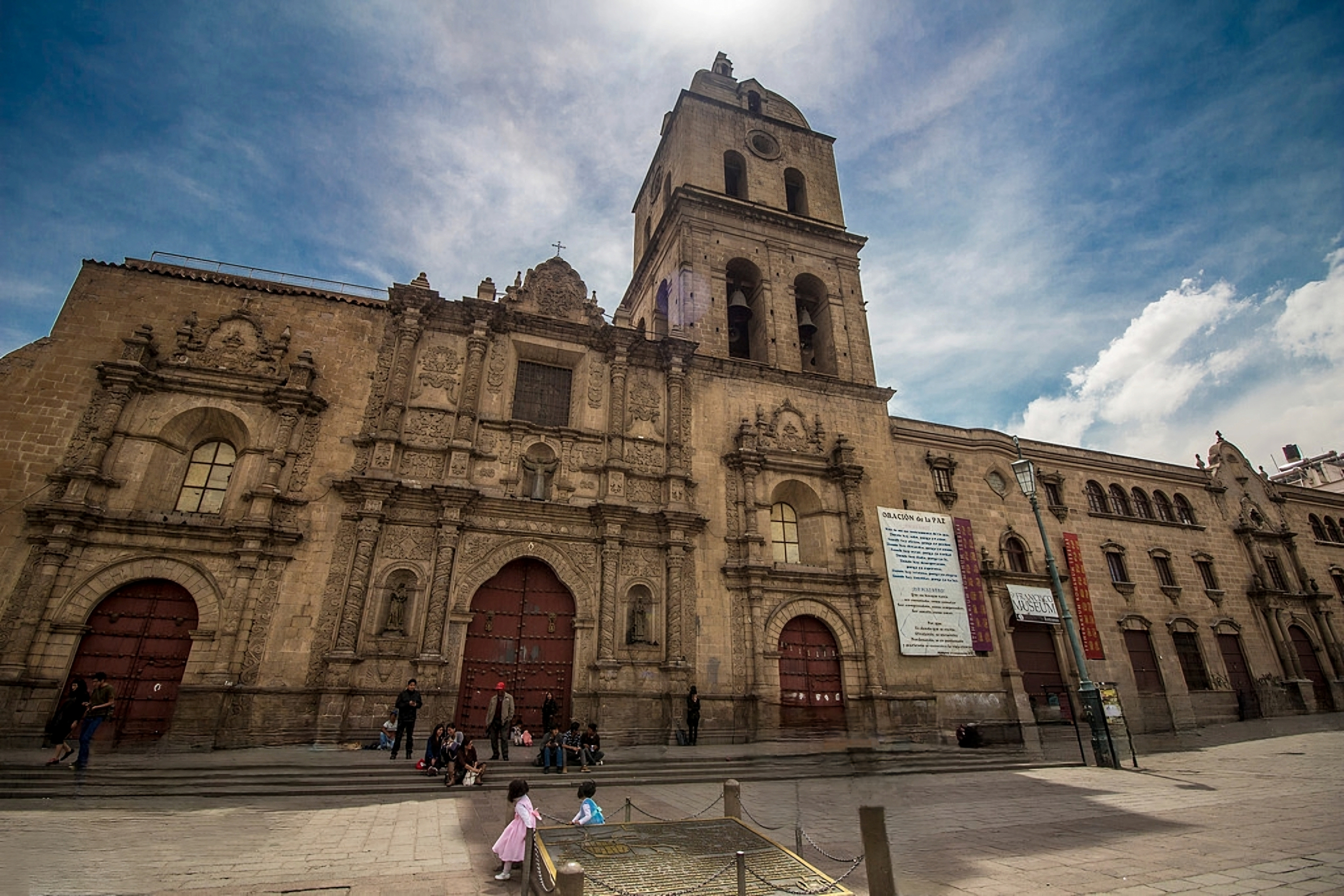
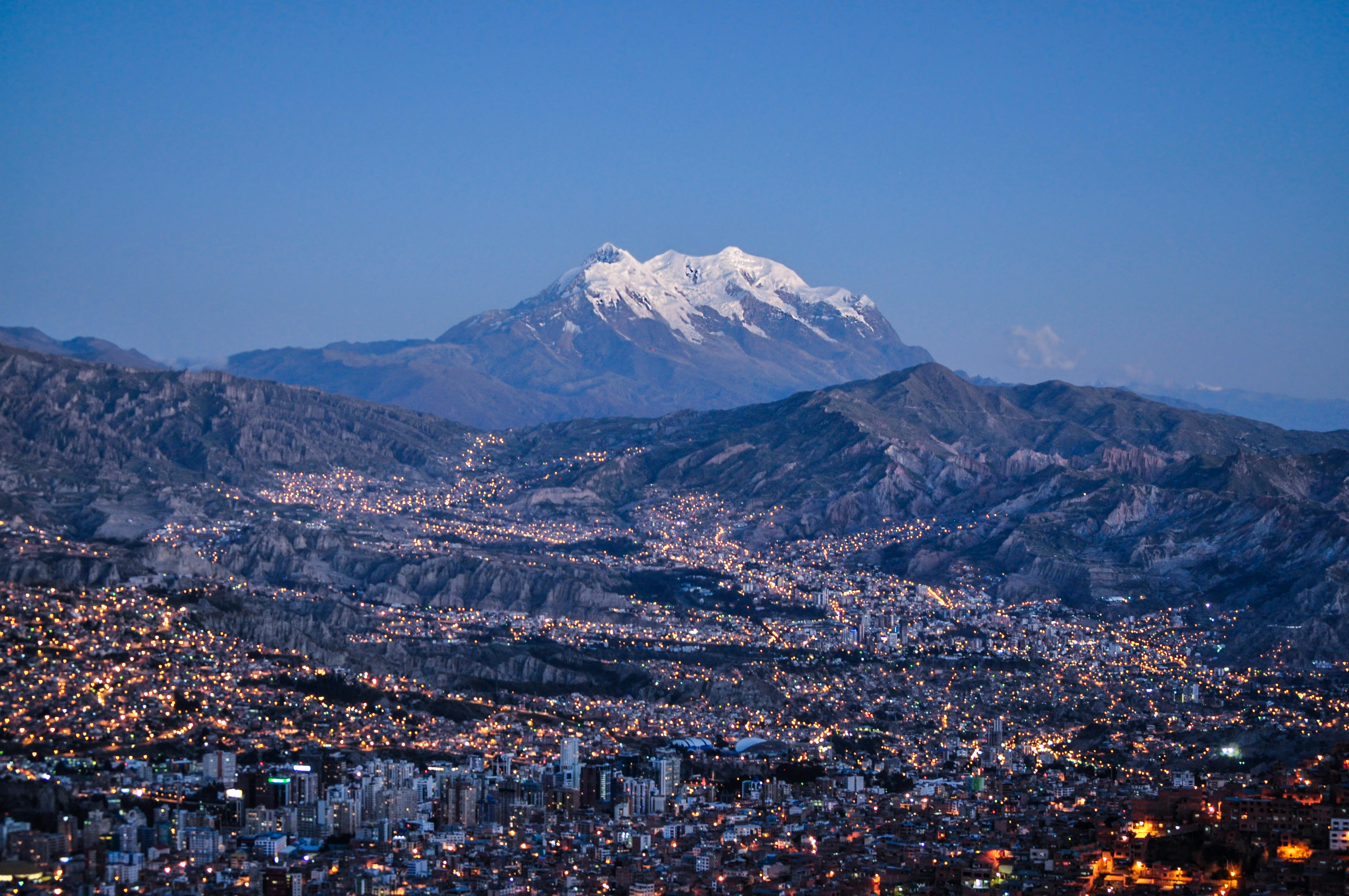
- View of the city center Plaza Murillo La Paz Town Hall Mi Teleférico Metropolitan Cathedral Miraflores Basilica of San Francisco View towards Mount Illimani from El Alto

- Flag Seal
- Motto(s): Los discordes en concordia, en paz y amor se juntaron y pueblo de paz fundaron para perpetua memoria. ("The dissenters in harmony gathered together in peace and love, and a town of peace they founded, for perpetual memory.")
- Anthem: Himno Paceño
- Location within Bolivia Location within South America
- Coordinates: 16°29′45″S 68°08′00″W
- Country: Bolivia
- Department: La Paz
- Province: Pedro Domingo Murillo
- Municipality: La Paz
- Founded: 20 October 1548 by Alonso de Mendoza
- Independence: 16 July 1809
- El Alto incorporated: 20th century

Government
  - Mayor: Iván Arias

Area
  - Seat of Government: 472 km^{2} (182 sq mi)
  - Urban: 3,240 km^{2} (1,250 sq mi)
- Elevation: 3,650 m (11,980 ft)

Population (2024 census)
  - Seat of Government: 755,732
  - Rank: 3rd in Bolivia
  - Density: 1,600/km^{2} (4,150/sq mi)
  - Urban: 2,063,633
  - Metro: 2,069,000
- Demonym(s): paceño, -a

GDP (PPP, constant 2015 values)
  - Year: 2023
  - Total (Metro): $14.6 billion
  - Per capita: $3,840
- Time zone: UTC−04:00 (BOT)
- Postal code: 0201-0220
- Area code: 2
- ISO 3166 code: BO-L
- HDI (2016): 0.784 (High)
- Website: www.lapaz.bo

La Paz (Spanish: [la ˈpas]; lit. 'the peace'), officially Nuestra Señora de La Paz (Aymara: Chuqi Yapu, pronounced [ˈtʃoqɛ ˈjapʊ]), is the seat of government of Bolivia. With 755,732 residents as of 2024, it is the third-most populous city in Bolivia. Its metropolitan area, which includes the neighboring city of El Alto, and other smaller towns, is the second most populous urban area in Bolivia, with a population of 2.2 million, after Santa Cruz de la Sierra with a population of 2.3 million. The city is also the capital of the department of the same name.

Located in west-central Bolivia 68 km (42 mi) southeast of Lake Titicaca, La Paz is set in a canyon created by the Choqueyapu River. It is in a bowl-like depression, part of the Amazon basin, surrounded by the high mountains of the Altiplano. Overlooking the city is the triple-peaked Illimani. Its peaks are always snow-covered and can be seen from many parts of the city. At an elevation of roughly 3,650 m (11,975 ft) above sea level, La Paz is the highest administrative capital city in the world. Due to its altitude, the city has an unusual subtropical highland climate, with rainy summers and dry winters.

La Paz was founded on 20 October 1548, by the Spanish conquistador Captain Alonso de Mendoza, at the site of the Inca settlement of Laja as a connecting point between the commercial routes that led from Potosí and Oruro to Lima; the full name of the city was originally Nuestra Señora de La Paz (meaning Our Lady of Peace) in commemoration of the restoration of peace following the insurrection of Gonzalo Pizarro and fellow conquistadors against the first viceroy of Peru. The city was later moved to its present location in the valley of Chuquiago Marka. La Paz was under Spanish colonial rule as part of the Viceroyalty of the Río de la Plata, before Bolivia gained independence. Since its founding, the city was the site of numerous revolts. In 1781, the indigenous leader and independence activist Túpac Katari laid siege to the city for a total of six months, but was finally defeated. On 16 July 1809, the Bolivian patriot Pedro Domingo Murillo ignited a revolution for independence, marking the beginning of the Spanish American Wars of Independence, which gained the freedom of South American states in 1821.

As the seat of the government of Bolivia, La Paz is the site of the Palacio Quemado, the presidential palace. It is also the seat of the Bolivian legislature, the Plurinational Legislative Assembly, and numerous government departments and agencies. The constitutional capital of Bolivia, Sucre, retains the judicial power. The city hosts all the foreign embassies as well as international missions in the country. La Paz is an important political, administrative, economic, and sports center of Bolivia; it generates 24% of the nation's gross domestic product and serves as the headquarters for numerous Bolivian companies and industries.

La Paz is also an important cultural center of South America, as it hosts several landmarks dating from colonial times, such as the San Francisco Church, the Metropolitan Cathedral, the Plaza Murillo and Jaén Street. La Paz is also situated at the confluence of archaeological regions of the Tiwanaku and Inca Empire. The city is renowned for its markets, particularly the Witches' Market, and for its nightlife. Its topography offers views of the city and the surrounding mountains of the Cordillera Real from numerous natural viewing points. La Paz is home to the largest urban cable car network in the world.

== Name and toponyms ==
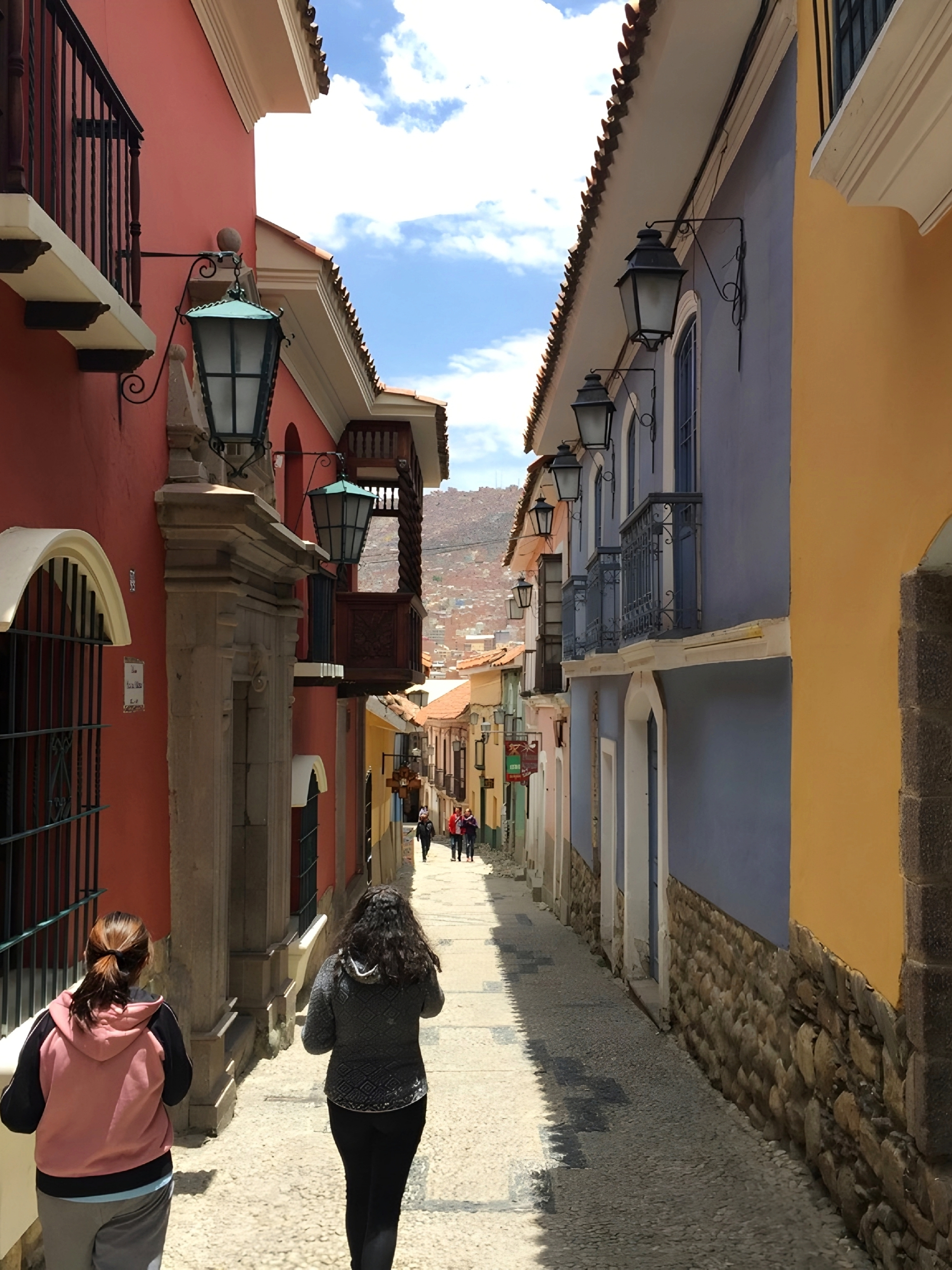
Calle Jaén, in the historic center of La Paz, contains well-preserved Spanish colonial buildings.

The Spanish conquistadors founded the city in 1548 with the name Nuestra Señora de La Paz (meaning "Our Lady of Peace"). The name commemorated the restoration of peace following the insurrection of Gonzalo Pizarro and fellow conquistadors four years earlier against Blasco Núñez Vela, the first viceroy of Peru.

In 1825, after the decisive victory of the republicans at Ayacucho over the Spanish army in the course of the Spanish American wars of independence, the city's full name was changed to La Paz de Ayacucho (meaning The Peace of Ayacucho).

The region in which La Paz is located in was known as Chuquiago Marka (marka means village; Chuqi Yapu means 'gold farm', probably due to the exploitation of gold nuggets in the small rivers of the place; spelling differences due to Aymara writing compared to Spanish transliteration) in the Aymara language, leading former President of Bolivia Evo Morales to suggest renaming the city to "Chuquiago Marka" in a speech in 2017.

== History ==
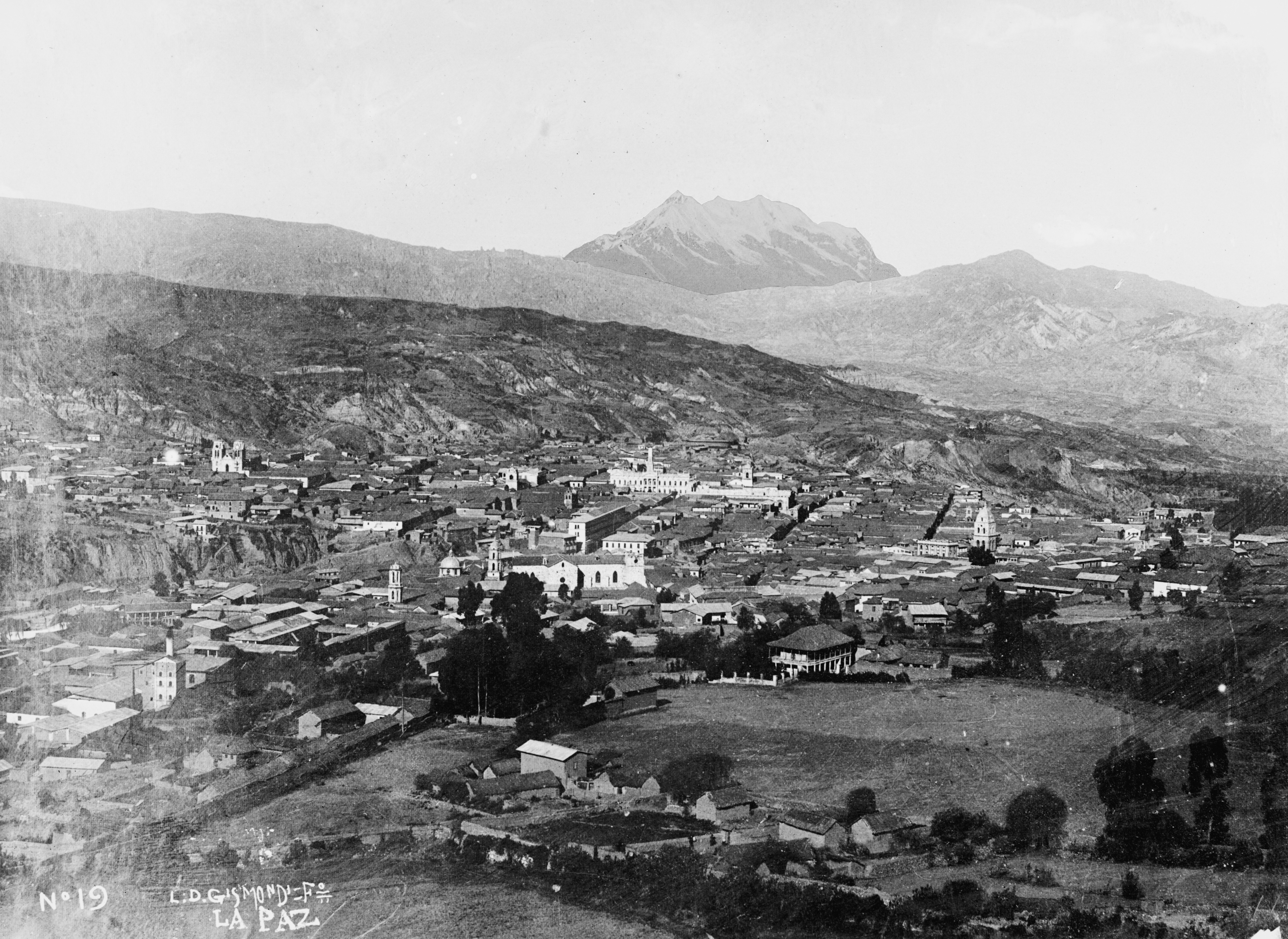
View of La Paz between 1909 and 1920

This area had been the site of an Inca city on a major trading route.

Although the Spanish conquistadors entered the area in 1535, they did not find La Paz until 1548. Originally it was to be at the site of the Native American settlement, Laja. The town site was moved a few days later to its present location in the valley of Chuquiago, which is more clement.

Control over the former Inca lands had been entrusted to Pedro de la Gasca by the Spanish king (and Holy Roman Emperor) Emperor Charles V. Gasca commanded Alonso de Mendoza to found a new city commemorating the end of the civil wars in Peru; the city of La Paz was founded on 20 October 1548, by Alonzo de Mendoza, with Juan de Vargas appointed as its first mayor.

In 1549, Juan Gutierrez Paniagua was commanded to design an urban plan that would designate sites for public areas, plazas, official buildings, and a cathedral. These were meant to express the ideals and relationships of Spanish colonial society. La Plaza de los Españoles, which is known today as the Plaza Murillo, was chosen as the location for government buildings as well as the Metropolitan Cathedral.

Spain controlled La Paz with a firm grip and the Spanish king had the last word in all matters political, but consultation was extended, taking months or longer by sea. Indigenous and other unrest was repeated around the turn of the nineteenth century. In 1781, for a total of six months, a group of Aymara people laid siege to La Paz. Under the leadership of Tupac Katari, they destroyed churches and government property. Thirty years later Indians conducted a two-month siege against La Paz. This incident was the setting for the origin of the legend of the Ekeko. In 1809, the struggle for independence from the Spanish rule brought uprisings against the royalist forces. On 16 July 1809, Pedro Domingo Murillo said that the Bolivian revolution was igniting a lamp that nobody would be able to turn off. This uprising formally marked the beginning of the liberation of South America from Spain. The first open rebellions against the Spanish Crown took place in La Paz and the city of Sucre simultaneously. This event is known as the Primer Grito Libertario de América and brought about the Bolivian War of Independence.

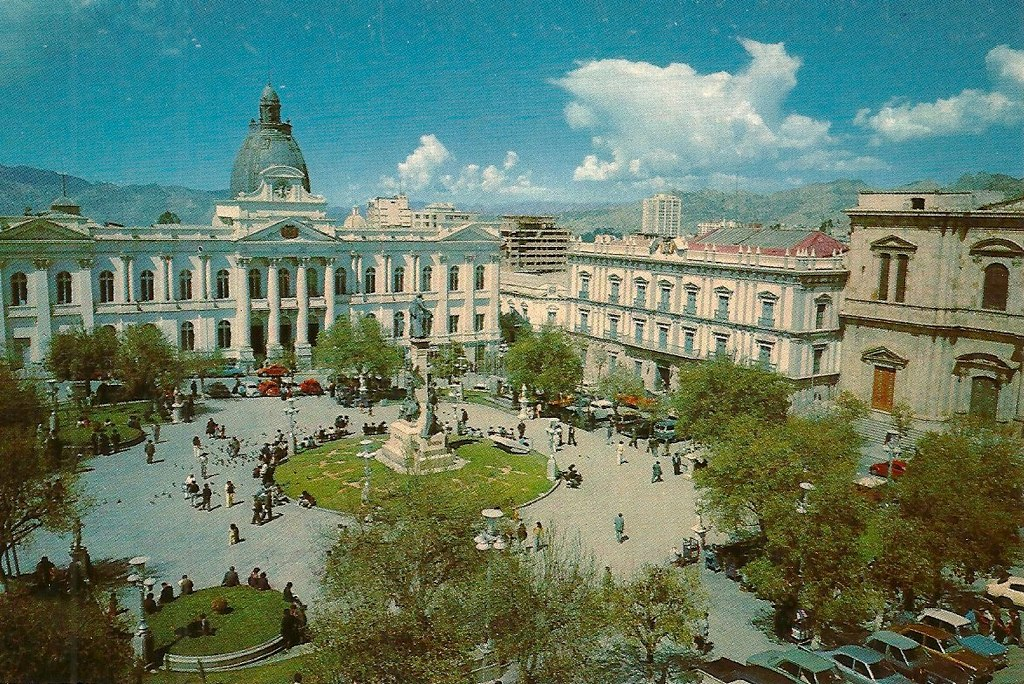
Plaza Murrillo, the city's main square, seen in 1987.

Pedro Domingo Murillo was hanged at the Plaza de los Españoles several months later, on 29 January 1810. After Bolivia gained independence, La Paz named this plaza after him, to commemorate him always. He is remembered as the voice of revolution across South America.

In 1898, La Paz was made the de facto seat of the national government, with Sucre remaining the nominal historical as well as judiciary capital. This change reflected the shift of the Bolivian economy away from the largely exhausted silver mines of Potosí to the exploitation of tin near Oruro, and resulting shifts in the distribution of economic and political power among various national elites.

The segregation of Cholitas (women of Andean indigenous background) continued until the 1980s. They were not allowed to enter certain public places and were banned from cinemas and some restaurants, with more emphasis in Bolivian eastern cities like Santa Cruz De La Sierra.

== Geography ==
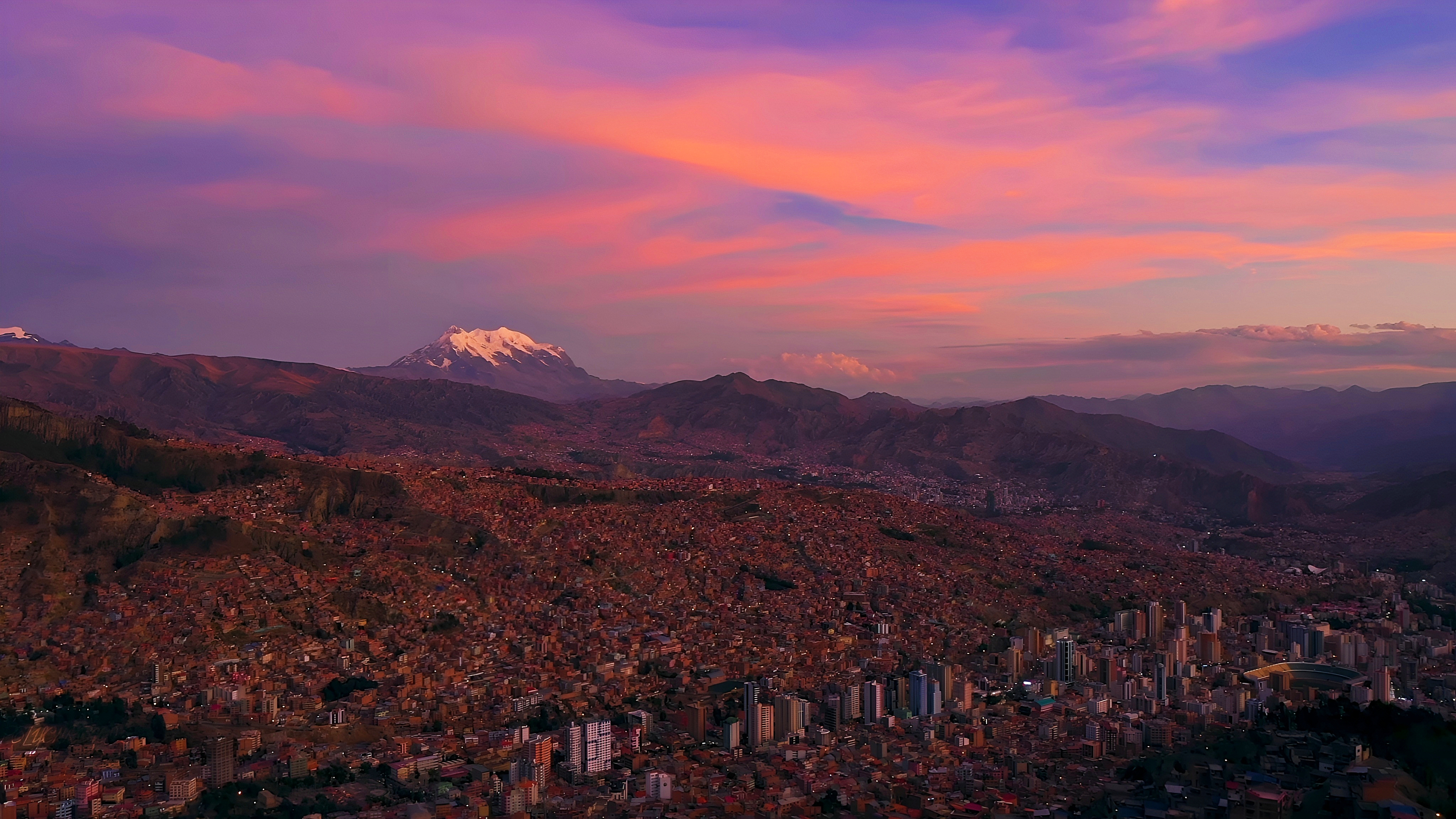
La Paz is characterized by its mountainous geography, the snow-capped Illimani dominates the city's skyline

La Paz is in the valleys of the Andes, close to the Eastern split of the Altiplano region. The metropolitan area is near to the Cordillera Real range, which includes such notable mountains as Illimani (guardian of La Paz), Mururata, Huayna Potosi, Chacaltaya, Kunturiri, Llamp'u, Chachakumani, Chearoco, and Ancohuma.

La Paz is built in a canyon created by the Choqueyapu River (now mostly built over), which runs northwest to southeast. The city's main thoroughfare, which roughly follows the river, changes names over its length, but the central tree-lined section running through the downtown core is called the Prado.

The geography of La Paz (in particular the altitude) is marked by social differences. The more affluent residents live in the lower, central areas of the city southwest of the Prado. Many middle-class residents live in high-rise condos near the center. Lower-income residents live in makeshift brick houses in the surrounding hills. The satellite city of El Alto, where the airport is, is spread over a broad area to the west of the canyon, on the Altiplano.

An earthquake in July 1994 rated at 8.2 struck 200 miles (322 km) north of La Paz. It could be felt near La Paz and caused damage throughout the villages of the area. In February 2002 the city was subjected to a hail and rainstorm that resulted in flooding causing serious damage and over 50 deaths.

=== Climate ===
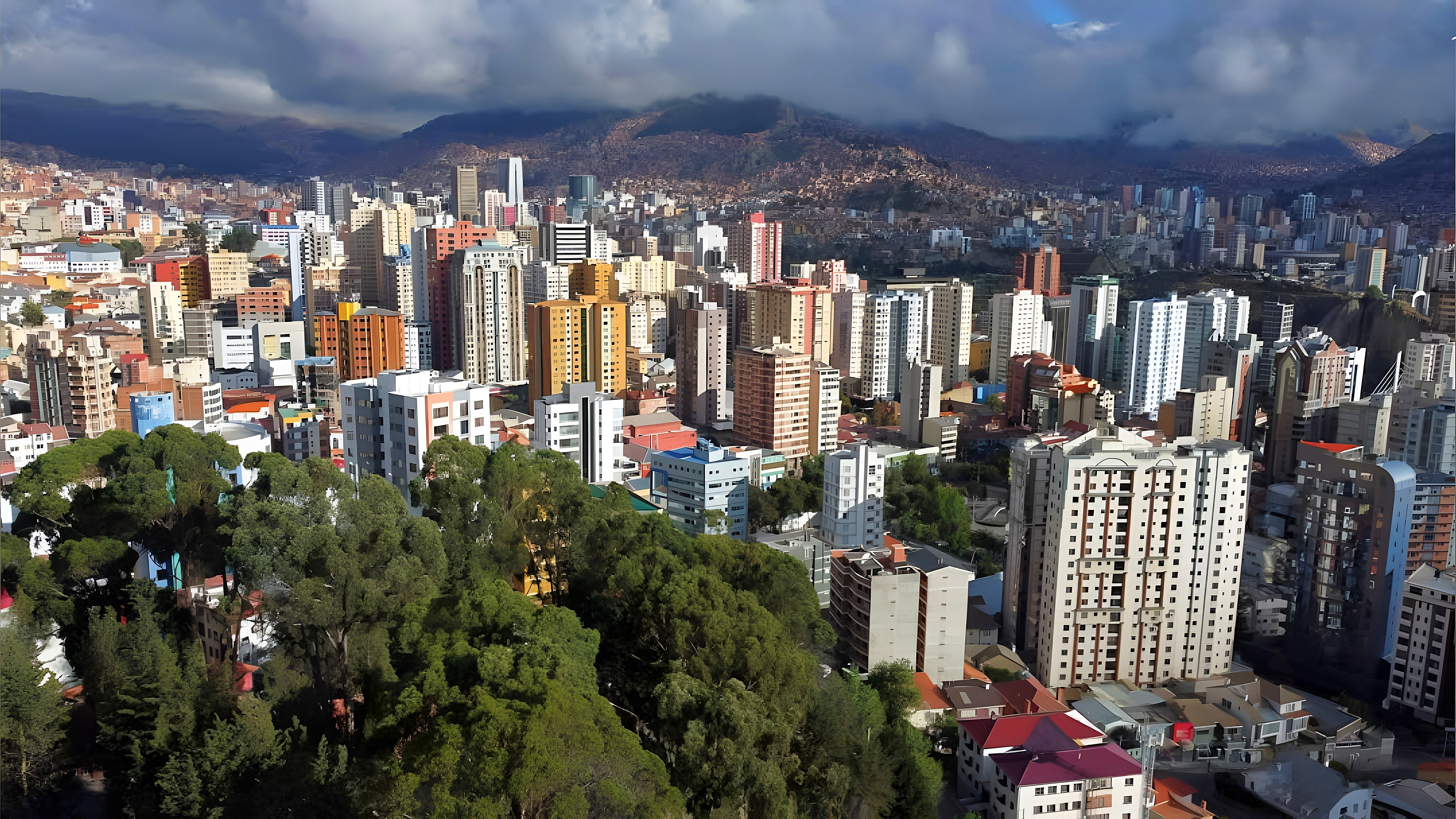
Due to its geographical location and altitude, La Paz has an unusual climate with rainy summers, dry winters and little temperature seasonality

La Paz (Laikakota Park)

Climate chart (precipitation, max. and min. temperature)
J	F	M	A	M	J	J	A	S	O	N	D
126 19 7	81 19 7	68 19 7	27 19 6	8.9 19 5	7.9 18 3	5.3 17 3	12 18 4	25 19 5	38 20 6	44 20 7	82 20 8
- █ Average max. and min. temperatures in °C
- █ Precipitation totals in mm
Imperial conversion
J	F	M	A	M	J	J	A	S	O	N	D
4.9 65 45	3.2 66 45	2.7 66 45	1.1 67 43	0.4 66 40	0.3 64 38	0.2 63 37	0.5 65 39	1 66 41	1.5 68 43	1.7 69 45	3.2 68 46
- █ Average max. and min. temperatures in °F
- █ Precipitation totals in inches

At more than 4,000 meters (13,000 ft) above sea level, higher parts of La Paz have a cold subtropical highland climate (Köppen: Cwc), bordering on a tundra climate (Köppen: ET). At this altitude, night-time temperatures range from cold to very cold. Snow flurries can occur in winter, especially at dawn and usually melts before noon. Despite being located only 16 degrees from the equator, this part of the city has average temperatures similar to that of cities such as Bergen, Norway or Tórshavn, Faroe Islands.

Temperatures in central La Paz, at 3,600 meters (11,811 feet), and in the Zona Sur (Southern Zone), at 3,250 m (10,663 ft) above sea level are warmer and are classified as subtropical highland climate (Köppen: Cwb). Heavy precipitation typically occurs throughout summer, and often causes destructive mudslides. At an altitude of 3,250 meters, in the southern part of the city, the wettest month is January with a monthly average of 114 mm (4.5 in), and the driest is July with 8 mm (0.3 in).

The whole city has rainy summers and dry winters. The city has a relatively dry climate, with rainfall occurring mainly in the slightly warmer months of November to March. Heavy precipitation typically occurs throughout summer, and often causes destructive mudslides. The wettest month is January with a monthly average of 100–140 mm (3.9–5.5 in) of precipitation, and the driest months are June and July with around 5 mm (0.2 in) of precipitation.

In the highest part of the city, above 4,000 meters, the two cloudiest months are February and March, in late summer, when sunshine averages around 5 hours per day. The two sunniest months are June and July, in winter, when sunshine averages around 8 hours per day.

Climate data for El Alto, Bolivia (El Alto International Airport), elevation 4,058 m (13,314 ft), (1991–2020 normals, extremes 1942–present)
Month	Jan	Feb	Mar	Apr	May	Jun	Jul	Aug	Sep	Oct	Nov	Dec	Year
Record high °C (°F)	25.4 (77.7)	22.8 (73.0)	25.1 (77.2)	22.9 (73.2)	24.0 (75.2)	20.0 (68.0)	23.0 (73.4)	21.0 (69.8)	23.0 (73.4)	23.0 (73.4)	24.2 (75.6)	22.0 (71.6)	25.4 (77.7)
Mean daily maximum °C (°F)	14.6 (58.3)	14.6 (58.3)	14.8 (58.6)	15.1 (59.2)	15.1 (59.2)	14.3 (57.7)	14.1 (57.4)	15.1 (59.2)	15.7 (60.3)	16.2 (61.2)	17.0 (62.6)	16.0 (60.8)	15.2 (59.4)
Daily mean °C (°F)	9.4 (48.9)	9.4 (48.9)	9.1 (48.4)	8.3 (46.9)	6.6 (43.9)	5.3 (41.5)	5.1 (41.2)	6.0 (42.8)	7.5 (45.5)	8.8 (47.8)	9.7 (49.5)	9.9 (49.8)	7.9 (46.3)
Mean daily minimum °C (°F)	4.2 (39.6)	4.1 (39.4)	3.4 (38.1)	1.4 (34.5)	−1.9 (28.6)	−3.7 (25.3)	−4.1 (24.6)	−3.1 (26.4)	−0.7 (30.7)	1.4 (34.5)	2.4 (36.3)	3.7 (38.7)	0.6 (33.1)
Record low °C (°F)	−3.3 (26.1)	−3.3 (26.1)	−2.7 (27.1)	−4.7 (23.5)	−10.3 (13.5)	−12.4 (9.7)	−11.9 (10.6)	−10 (14)	−10 (14)	−5.4 (22.3)	−5 (23)	−2.8 (27.0)	−12.4 (9.7)
Average precipitation mm (inches)	133.7 (5.26)	104.7 (4.12)	71.7 (2.82)	31.7 (1.25)	14.3 (0.56)	5.1 (0.20)	7.1 (0.28)	15.2 (0.60)	35.5 (1.40)	38.1 (1.50)	50.5 (1.99)	94.9 (3.74)	602.5 (23.72)
Average precipitation days (≥ 0.1 mm)	20.7	15.8	14.2	9.8	3.6	2.8	2.8	5.1	8.2	10.4	11.5	15.5	120.3
Average snowy days	0.07	0.0	0.0	0.03	0.0	0.03	0.13	0.67	0.37	0.17	0.17	0.03	1.67
Average relative humidity (%)	66	72	67	59	48	42	43	42	48	49	51	60	54
Mean monthly sunshine hours	179.8	155.4	148.8	165.0	229.4	240.0	235.6	226.3	192.0	179.8	171.0	180.0	2,303.1
Mean daily sunshine hours	5.8	5.5	4.8	5.5	7.4	8.0	7.6	7.3	6.4	5.8	5.7	6.0	6.3
Source 1: Deutscher Wetterdienst (precipitation 1961–1990, humidity 1951–1981),
Source 2: Meteo Climat Servicio Nacional de Meteorología e Hidrología de Bolivia (snowy days 1981–2010)

Climate data for La Paz (Laikakota Park), elevation 3,650 m (11,980 ft), (1981–2010 normals, extremes 1945–present)
Month	Jan	Feb	Mar	Apr	May	Jun	Jul	Aug	Sep	Oct	Nov	Dec	Year
Record high °C (°F)	26.5 (79.7)	25.5 (77.9)	26.0 (78.8)	25.0 (77.0)	25.0 (77.0)	23.8 (74.8)	23.1 (73.6)	24.3 (75.7)	26.6 (79.9)	26.5 (79.7)	27.1 (80.8)	27.2 (81.0)	27.2 (81.0)
Mean daily maximum °C (°F)	18.5 (65.3)	18.7 (65.7)	18.9 (66.0)	19.2 (66.6)	19.1 (66.4)	17.8 (64.0)	17.4 (63.3)	18.4 (65.1)	19.0 (66.2)	19.8 (67.6)	20.4 (68.7)	20.0 (68.0)	18.9 (66.0)
Daily mean °C (°F)	12.9 (55.2)	13.0 (55.4)	13.0 (55.4)	12.7 (54.9)	11.8 (53.2)	10.5 (50.9)	10.1 (50.2)	11.0 (51.8)	11.9 (53.4)	13.0 (55.4)	13.7 (56.7)	13.7 (56.7)	12.3 (54.1)
Mean daily minimum °C (°F)	7.4 (45.3)	7.3 (45.1)	7.2 (45.0)	6.3 (43.3)	4.6 (40.3)	3.3 (37.9)	2.8 (37.0)	3.7 (38.7)	4.8 (40.6)	6.2 (43.2)	7.0 (44.6)	7.5 (45.5)	5.7 (42.3)
Record low °C (°F)	1.5 (34.7)	2.0 (35.6)	1.1 (34.0)	0.6 (33.1)	−2.0 (28.4)	−6.0 (21.2)	−2.8 (27.0)	−5.0 (23.0)	−0.8 (30.6)	0.0 (32.0)	0.5 (32.9)	1.0 (33.8)	−6.0 (21.2)
Average precipitation mm (inches)	125.5 (4.94)	81.0 (3.19)	67.5 (2.66)	27.1 (1.07)	8.9 (0.35)	7.9 (0.31)	5.3 (0.21)	12.1 (0.48)	24.5 (0.96)	37.8 (1.49)	43.9 (1.73)	82.3 (3.24)	523.8 (20.62)
Average precipitation days	21.3	17.0	15.4	8.6	3.5	2.2	2.1	3.9	6.7	10.7	11.4	16.1	119.0
Average relative humidity (%)	72.0	72.2	70.5	66.2	54.8	48.3	50.4	52.0	58.1	56.5	58.8	64.3	60.0
Mean monthly sunshine hours	145.4	158.4	167.9	187.6	245.7	238.3	240.9	250.1	232.0	215.5	181.5	171.2	2,434.5
Mean daily sunshine hours	5.0	5.9	5.9	6.6	8.2	8.2	8.8	8.5	8.2	7.4	6.8	6.0	7.1
Source: Servicio Nacional de Meteorología e Hidrología de Bolivia

== Districts and neighborhoods ==
No.	District	Zones	Type	Area km²	Population
1	Mallasa	20	Urban	32.68	5 082
2	Sur	18, 19, 21	Urban	64.15	127 228
3	San Antonio	14-15-16-17	Urban	22.59	115 659
4	Periférica	11-12-13	Urban	26.05	159 123
5	Max Paredes	7-8-9-10	Urban	13.31	164 566
6	Centro	1-2	Urban	5.22	64 275
7	Cotahuma	3-4-5-6	Urban	16.10	153 655
8	Zongo	23	Rural	-	-
9	Hampaturi	22	Rural	-	-

=== Main neighborhoods and zones ===
San Jorge

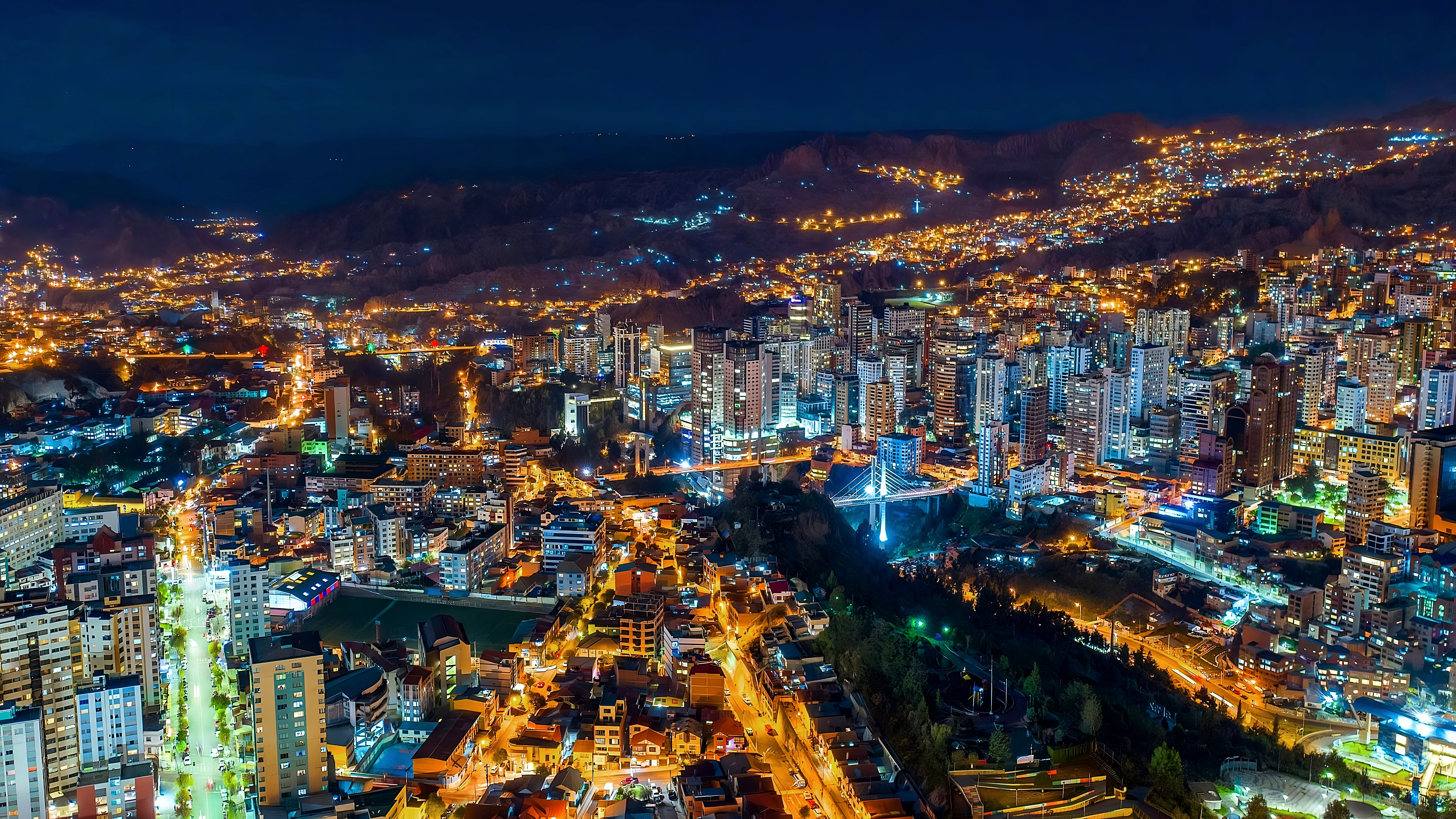
Aerial view of San Jorge in the Cotahuma district

Located in the district known as Cotahuma and near Sopocachi, is one of the main residential and diplomatic areas of the city. San Jorge was one of the most exclusive neighborhoods of La Paz and the financial center of the metropolis, housing international firms like Deloitte, Bank of America, Ernst & Young, BBVA and the famous Ritz Hotel. It is now home of some of Bolivia's tallest building known as Torre Girasoles, Torres del Poeta, and the only intelligent building of the country, known as Torre Azul. The neighborhood is also populated with expensive offices, renowned restaurants, museums and bookstores. Its Avenida Arce, one of the main streets of the city, is the highest-priced street in the country and the one with the most upscale boutiques in Bolivia. San Jorge is home to the embassies of the United States, the United Kingdom, Brazil, Japan, Germany and Spain. The offices of the World Bank, the Inter-American Development Bank, the CAF – Development Bank of Latin America and the Caribbean, the Goethe Institut, the Alliance Française and the Dante Alighieri Society are also located in this modern neighborhood.

Sopocachi

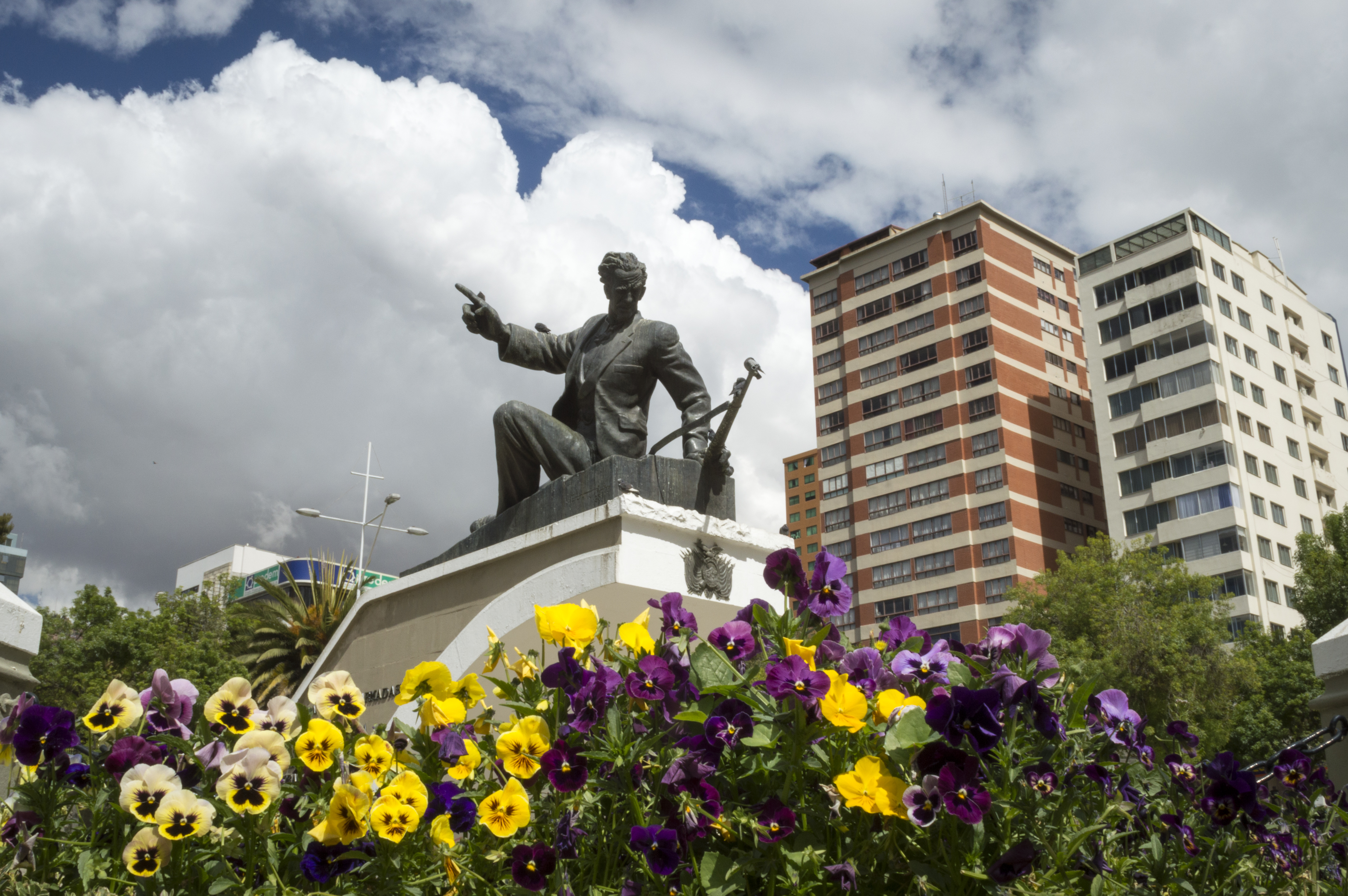
Plaza Abaroa in the neighborhood of Sopocachi.

Located in the 1st District (Cotahuma), Sopocachi is probably one of the oldest residential neighborhoods, 10 minutes from the center of the city. Despite the expansion and development of the area, this quarter maintained its residential property. In the last years, there has been an important commercial expansion, mainly on the surroundings of Abaroa Square, one of the many squares and parks of the zone.

San Pedro
Located in the 1st District (Cotahuma), on the right bank of the Choqueyapu River and built around the "Plaza de San Pedro" (official name: Plaza Sucre, Sucre Square), is home to numerous shops, businesses and small enterprises, especially printing, spare parts and auto maintenance and repair shops. San Pedro's "Rodriguez Market" remains as one of the most popular middle-class and oldest of the city. The San Pedro prison is here.

Centro

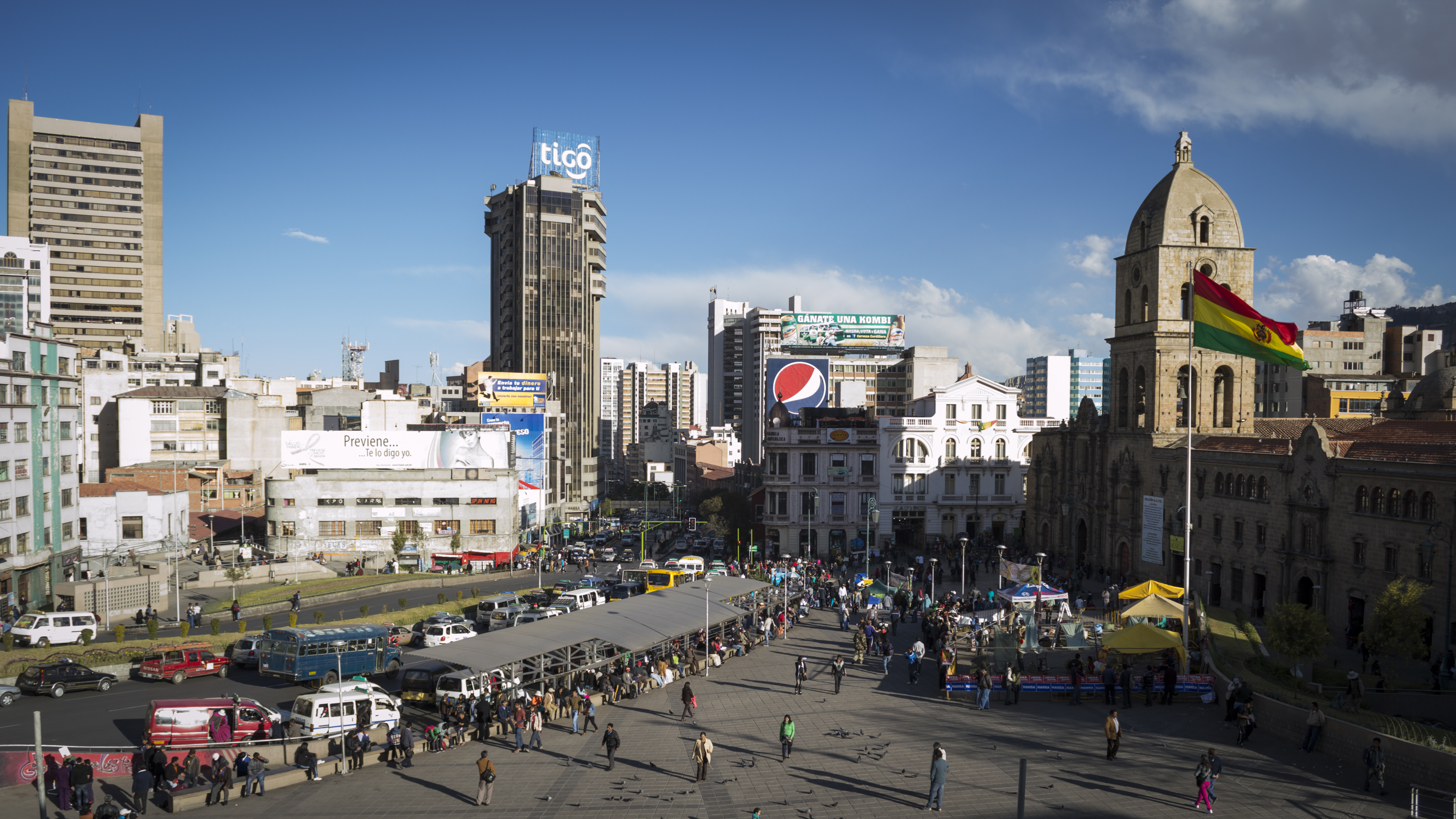
The Basilica of San Francisco in the city center

The city's downtown area, in the 7th District, comprising the center of La Paz and principal roads of the city, like Arce Avenue, 16 July Avenue (also known as "Prado Avenue"), Mariscal Santa Cruz Avenue and Camacho Avenue – the last one being the home of the headquarters of the principal banks and companies of the country.
Casco Viejo
Located in the 7th District, is the historic and ancient center of La Paz. It now houses museums, hotels, shops and buildings as the Mayor City of La Paz and the Central Bank of Bolivia. In the Old Quarter is the Plaza Murillo, which is home to the Government Palace and the National Congress.

Miraflores

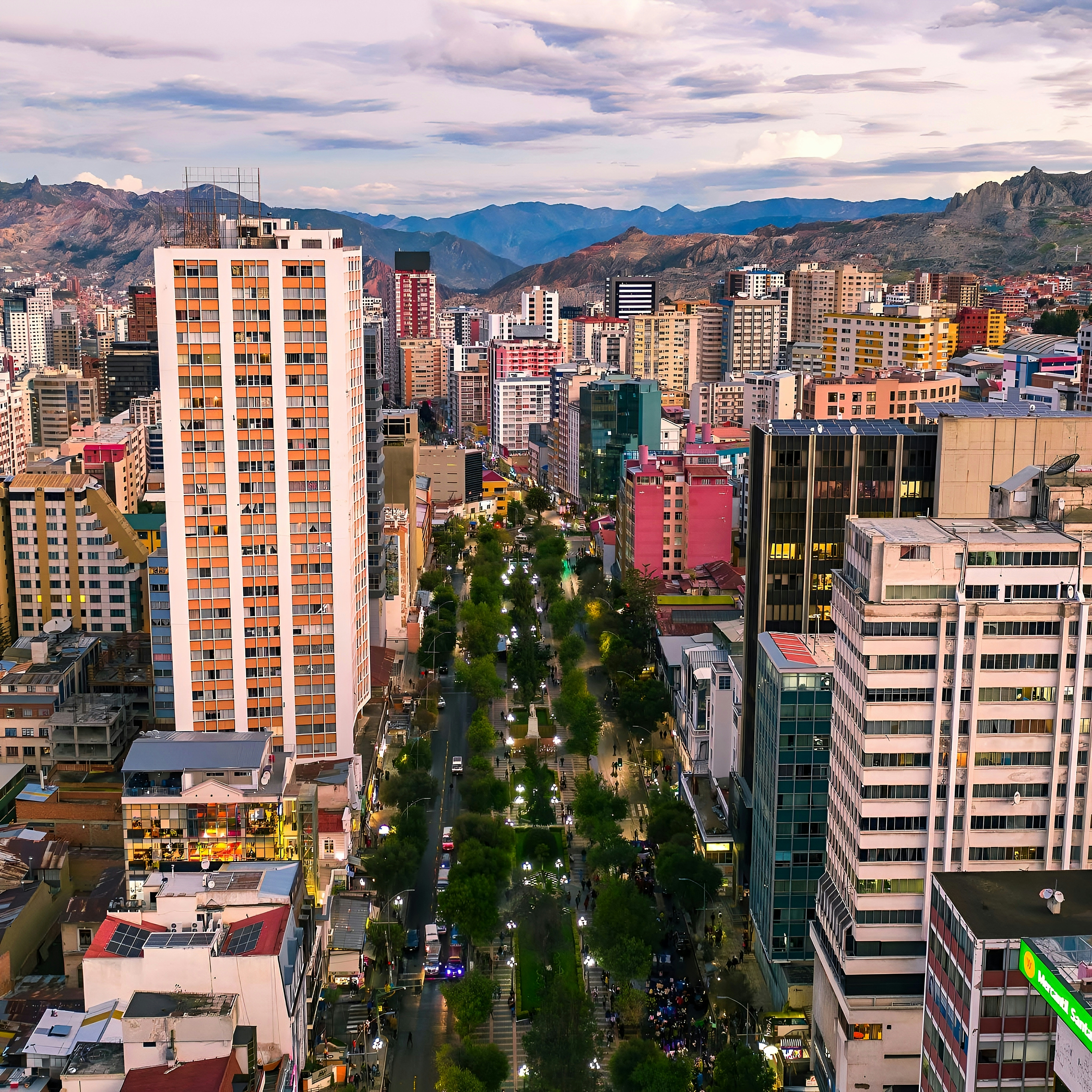
The Paseo del Prado, one of the main throughfares in the city

In the 7th District, Miraflores district is separated from downtown by a long barrel (Parque Urbano Central, "Central Urban Park") and connected by the Bridge of the Americas and two avenues. Originally a residential zone, its growth has led it to become a major recreational center. It houses universities (including the Universidad Mayor de San Andrés's faculty of medicine), hospitals and the Estadio Hernando Siles (capacity of 45,000 people).

Northern District
Located in the 2nd and 3rd districts, it has a significant industrial activity (mainly food), being the Cervecería Boliviana Nacional (Bolivian National Brewery) the most significant industry founded by Germans, and one of the city's biggest companies in the country. It connects La Paz with the city of El Alto by the autopista (highway).

Southern District

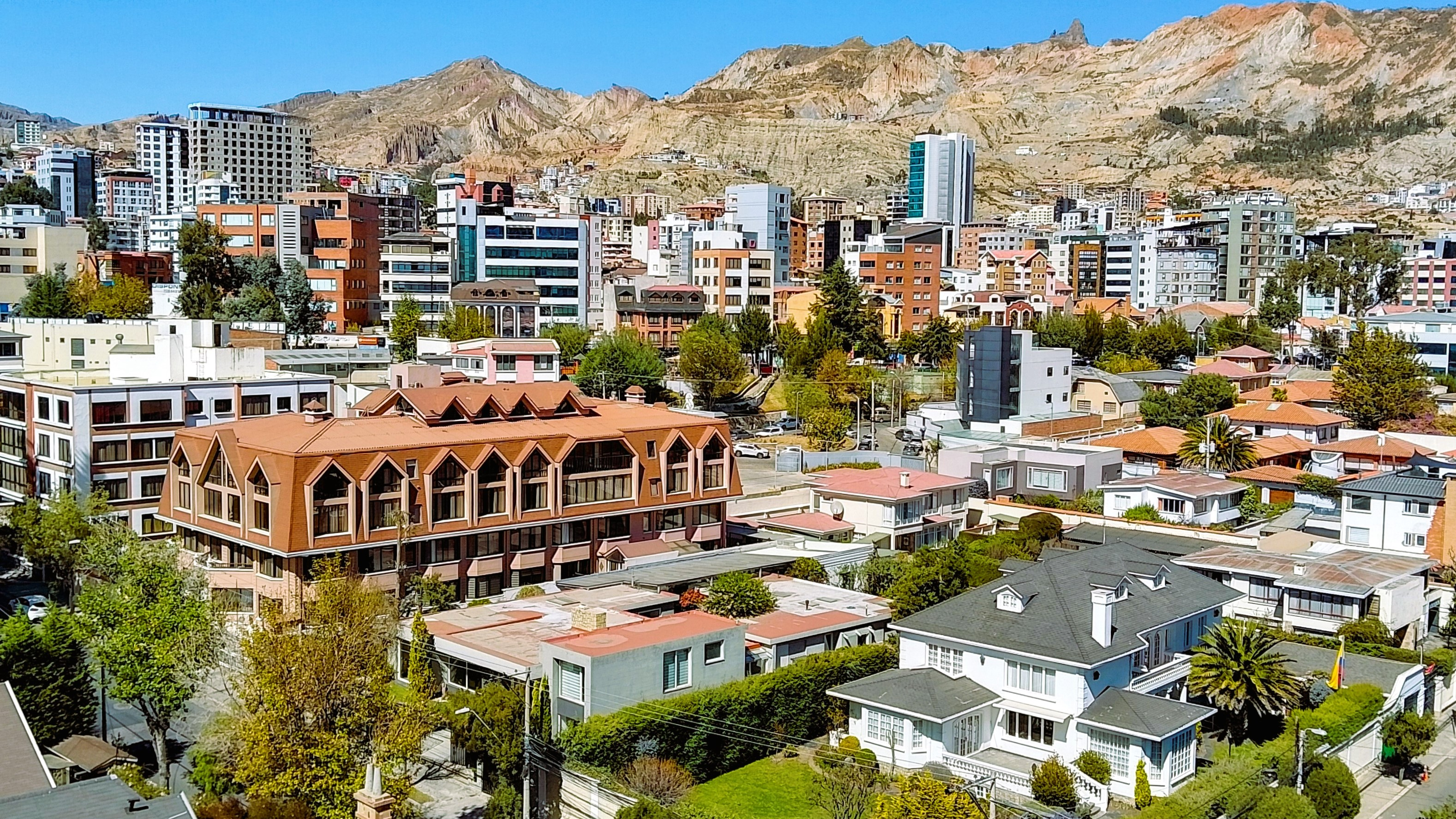
View of Calacoto in the Southern district

In the 5th district; has less height than the rest of La Paz (3,200 to 2,800 meters). It is referenced as the "Macrodistrito Sur" which has 3 districts with an area of 47.8 km2. The population density reached 3,084 inhabitants per squared km. in 2016. Obrajes, Bolognia, Koani, Achumani, San Miguel, Cota Cota, Irpavi, Següencoma, Ovejuyo, Chasquipampa, La Florida and Calacoto are some neighborhoods that make it up. This city district is the area of greatest expansion and growth, both population and the construction sector in La Paz. This area houses some of the most affluent and exclusive neighborhoods of the city. It has been benefited from steady economic growth and is now the second commercial and financial center of the city, housing international firms like Moody's, Citibank, Aon Corporation, Huawei, Millicom International Cellular, Nissan Motor Corporation, Samsung Electronics, Pan American Silver Corporation, a Sumitomo Corporation branch, Ernst & Young, and the "MegaCenter", La Paz's biggest shopping mall.

== Cityscape ==
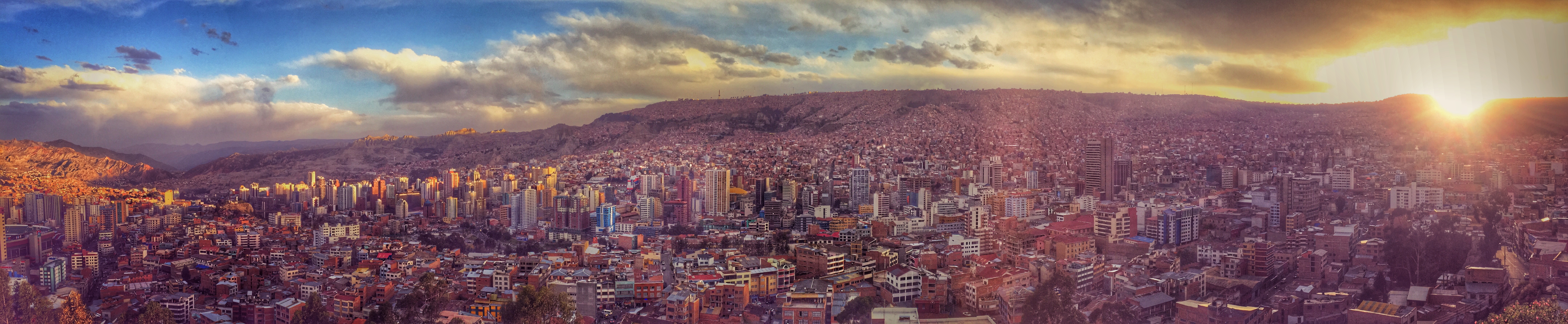
Panorama of La Paz at sunset, from the "Killi Killi" lookout.

== Colonial architecture ==
The city of La Paz has a consistently decreasing volume of colonial buildings, mostly centered around the vicinity of the Plaza Murillo. Due to a lack of funds and the inability of property owners to pay for restorations to colonial buildings, many have been torn down, or are in a dilapidated state. As historic buildings are more expensive to keep, land owners find it less of a burden to construct more modern buildings as opposed to keeping the old ones. Although there has been an increasing number of projects and propositions to restore some of the city's colonial buildings, the future of these historic edifices remains uncertain.

== Economy ==
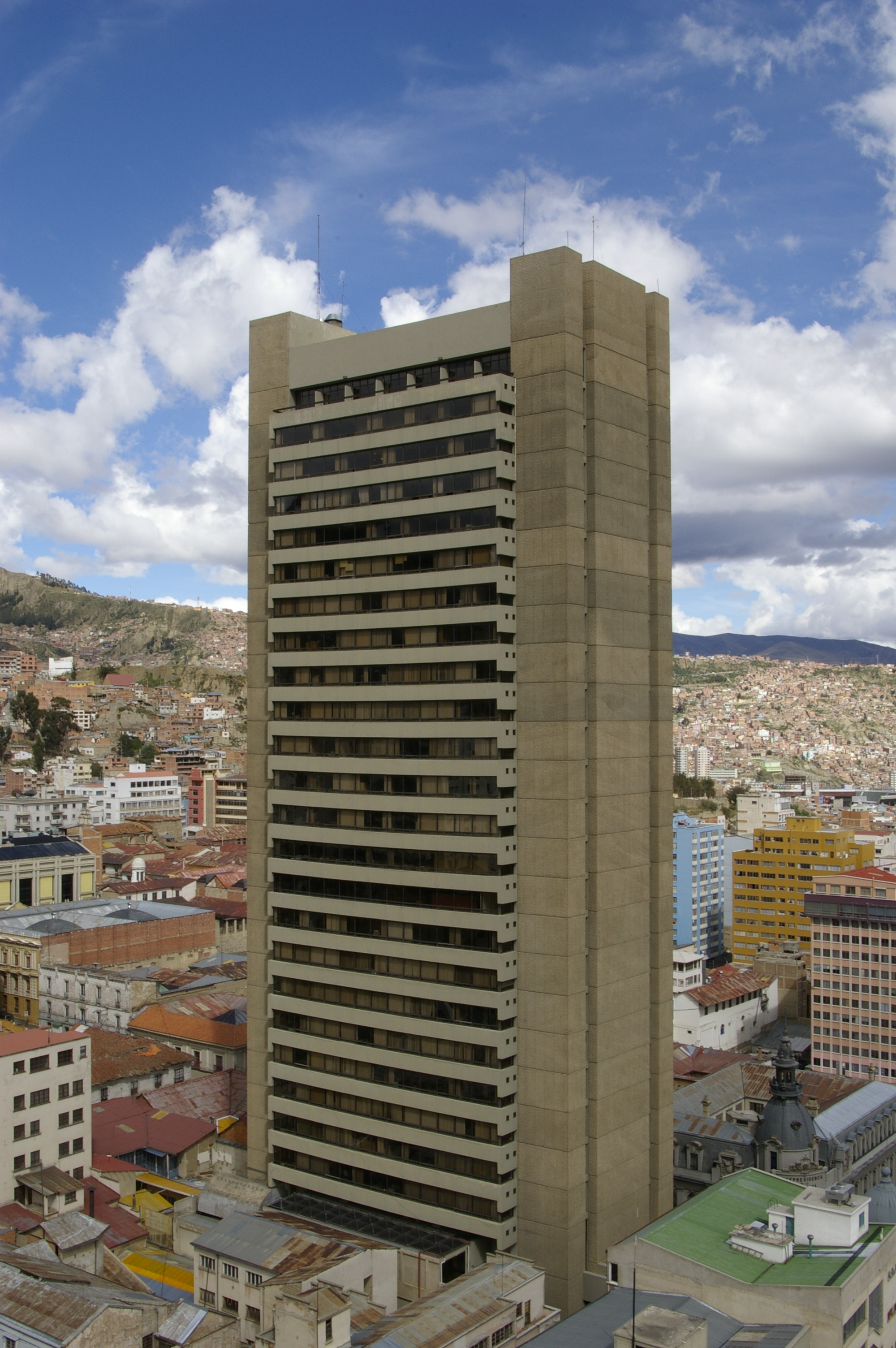
The Central Bank of Bolivia

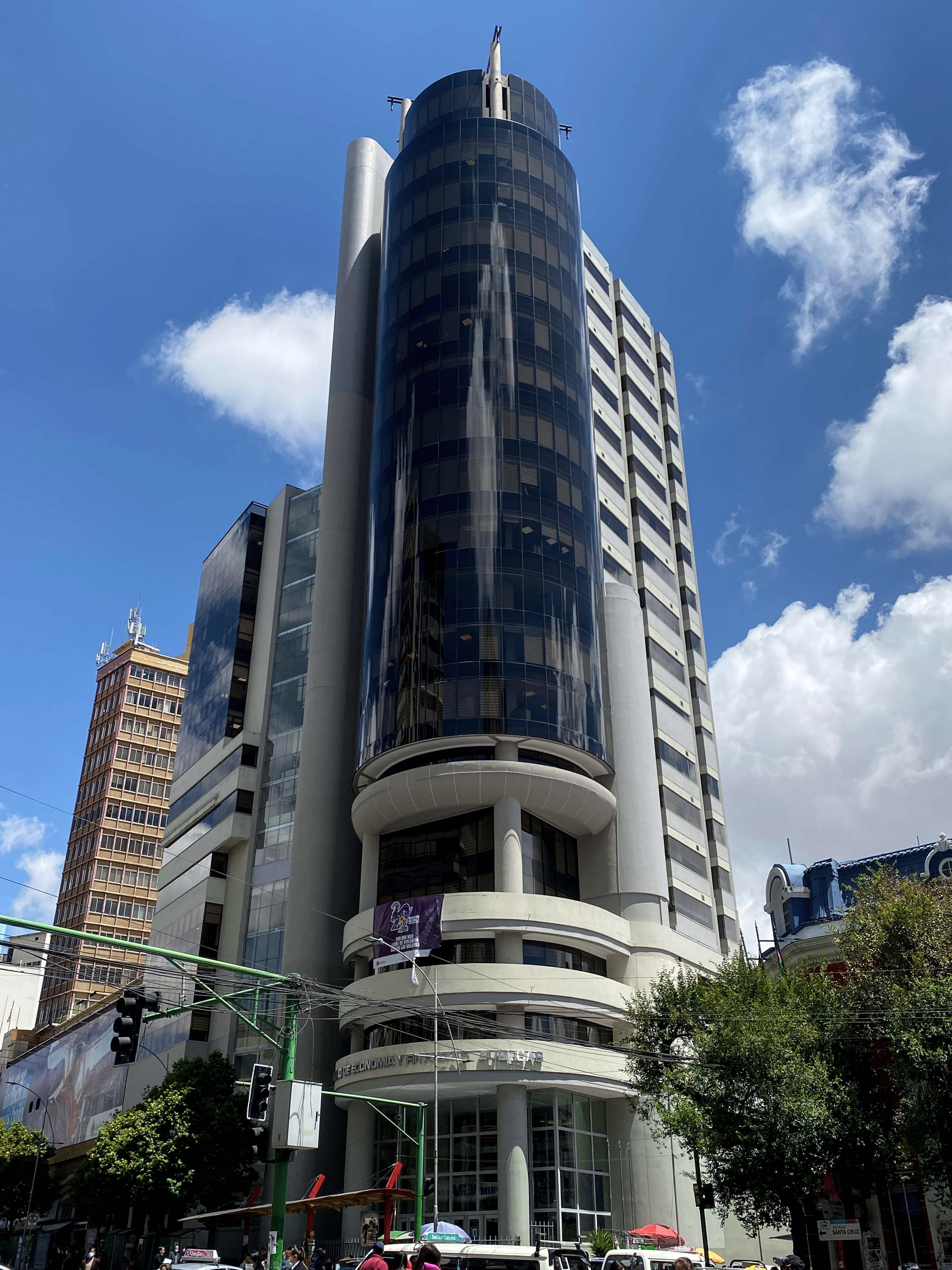
The Ministry of Economy and Public Finance Building

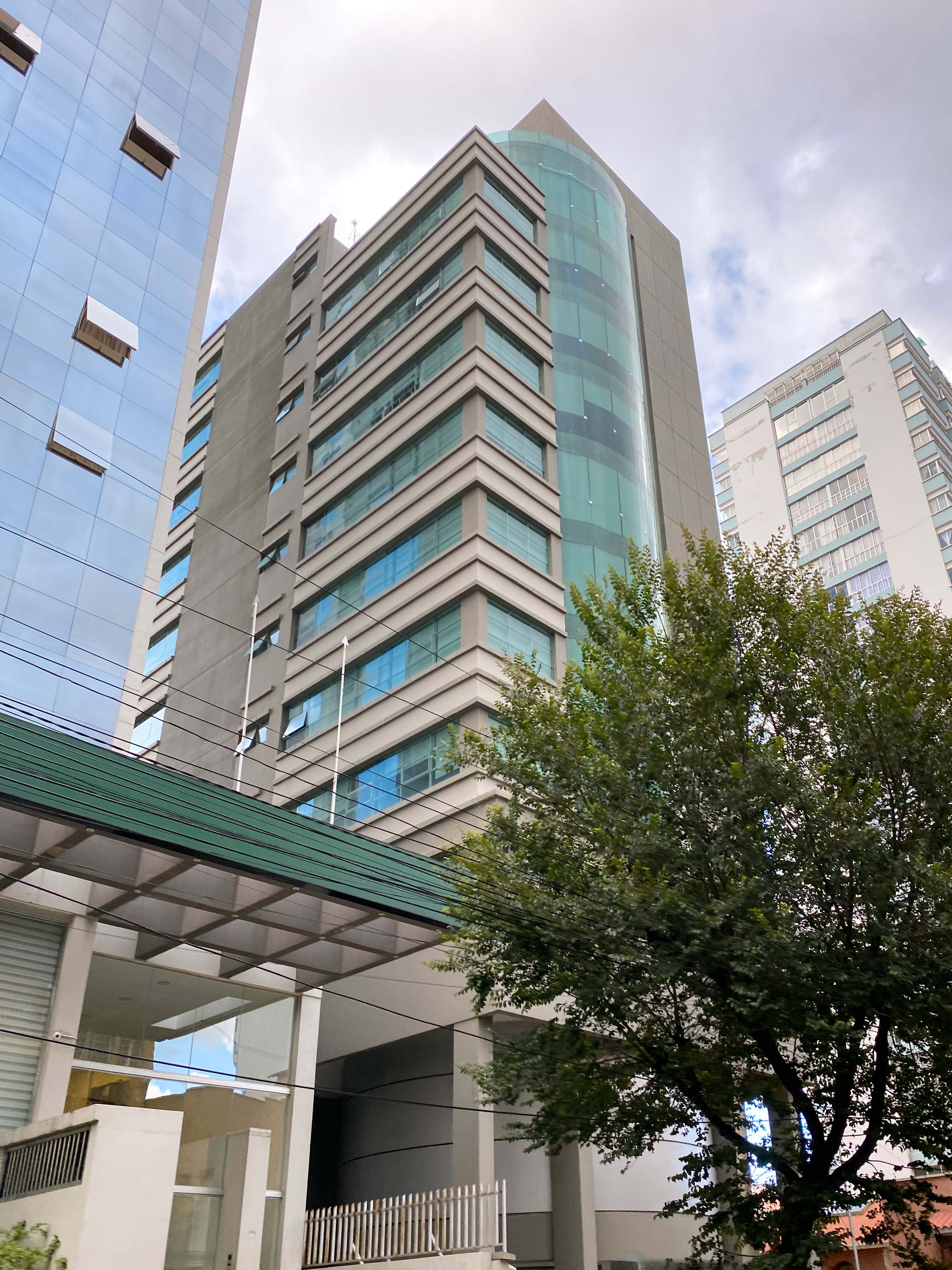
Headquarters of the Bolivian Stock Exchange

The economy of La Paz has improved greatly in recent years, mainly as a result of improved political stability. Due to the long period of high inflation and economic struggle faced by Bolivians in the 1980s and early 1990s, a large informal economy developed. Evidence of this is provided by the markets found all around the city.

While there are stable markets, almost every street in the downtown area and surrounding neighborhoods has at least one vendor on it.

La Paz remains the principal center of manufacturing enterprises that produce finished-product goods for the country, with about two-thirds of Bolivia's manufacturing located nearby. Historically, industry in Bolivia has been dominated by mineral processing and the preparation of agricultural products. However, in the urban center of La Paz, small plants carry out a large portion of the industry. Food, tobacco products, clothing, various consumer goods, building materials, and agricultural tools are produced. "The tin quotations from London are watched in La Paz with close interest as an index of the country's prosperity; a third of the national revenue and more than half of the total customs in 1925 were derived from tin; in short, that humble but indispensable metal is the hub around which Bolivia's economic life revolves. The tin deposits of Bolivia, second largest in the world, ... invite development."

== Sports ==
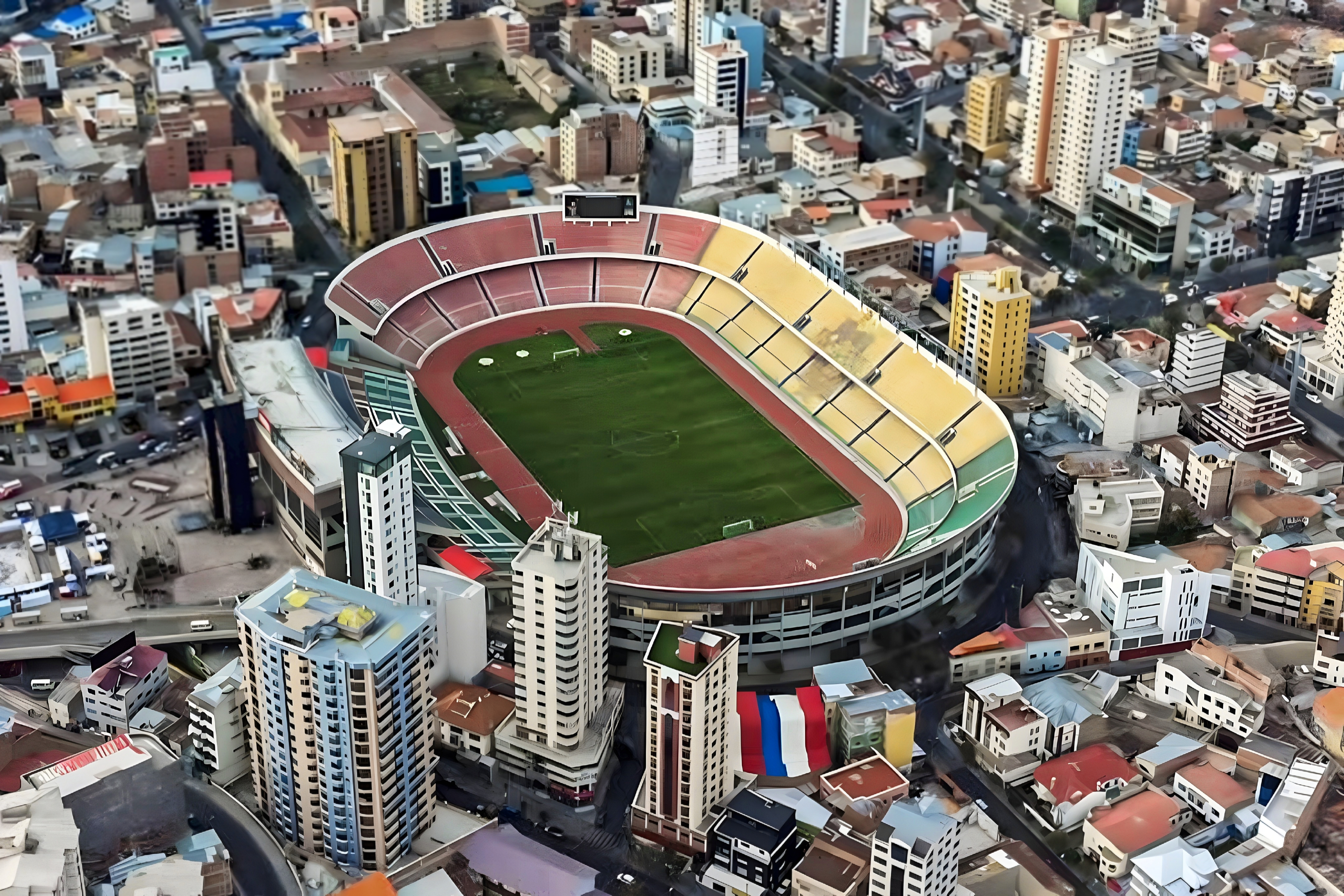
The Hernando Siles Stadium

The most popular sport in La Paz, as in the rest of the country, is football. Currently, three teams compete in Bolivia’s first division: Bolívar, The Strongest, and Club Always Ready. Between Bolívar and The Strongest, the Clásico Paceño is played, also considered the Bolivian clásico, since this match pits the two most decorated and popular teams in the country against each other. In 2012, FIFA recognized a list of the 120 official club derbies worldwide; in the case of Bolivia, the Clásico Paceño is the only one included on this list.

- Club Bolívar : Founded in 1925, it was named in honor of the Libertador Simón Bolívar, the team has won most of the tournaments national and international championships in the last 20 years, and is the largest team, by number of fans, of the country. The year 1964 was a bad year, as it was relegated from the top division, playing the next year in the second division. But it soon returned to the top flight.
- The Strongest : Founded in 1908 the club hosts some of its games and trains on their home stadium named Rafael Mendoza after Don Rafael Mendoza, one of the most important presidents of the club. In 1968 an airplane accident took the life of almost all the players, but Rafael Mendoza made many efforts that allowed the team to rise again as one of the most important in the country.
- La Paz F.C. : Founded in 1989, the club quickly rose through the ranks to become the third major club in the capital, only behind in popularity to the two well-established city rivals.

The city is host to several other teams that play in the first and second divisions such as:

- Academia de Balompié Boliviano
- Always Ready
- Chaco Petrolero
- Club 31 de Octubre
- Deportivo Municipal de La Paz
- Fraternidad Tigres
- Mariscal Braun
- Universitario de La Paz
- Club Unión Maestranza

With the exception of Deportivo Municipal and Unión Maestranza, all the other teams play the majority of their games in the city stadium, the Estadio Hernando Siles, which also hosts the national football team and international games. Always Ready frequently play at the Estadio Rafael Mendoza which belongs to The Strongest, who rarely use the stadium due to its relatively small capacity.

== Education ==
The city hosts some of the most important universities of the country:

Foundation	University			World Ranking 2012 (CSIC Webometrics)	Latin American Ranking 2012 (CSIC Webometrics)	Academic Production(Ranking Scimago Lab)	National Ranking	Logo	Web
1830-10-25	Universidad Mayor de San Andrés	UMSA	Public	2266	182	–	2		UMSA
1994-03-21	Universidad Católica Boliviana San Pablo	UCB	Private	3449	308	–	3		UCB
–	Universidad Central de Bolivia	UNICEN	Private	4919	489	–	5		UNICEN
–	Universidad Privada del Valle	UPV	Private	7686	757	–	8		UPV
–	UP Boliviana	UPB	Private	8206	822	–	9		Universidad Privada Boliviana
1950	Escuela Militar de Ingeniería	EMI	Private	10670	1103	–	13		EMI
–	Universidad Salesiana de Bolivia		Private	11280	1174	–	16		Salesiana
–	Universidad Nur Bolivia		Private	12461	1333	–	18		NUR
–	Universidad Loyola		Private	13398	1499	–	20		Loyola
–	Universidad Andina Simón Bolívar Bolivia	UASB	Public	13418	1506	–	21		UASB

== Tourism ==
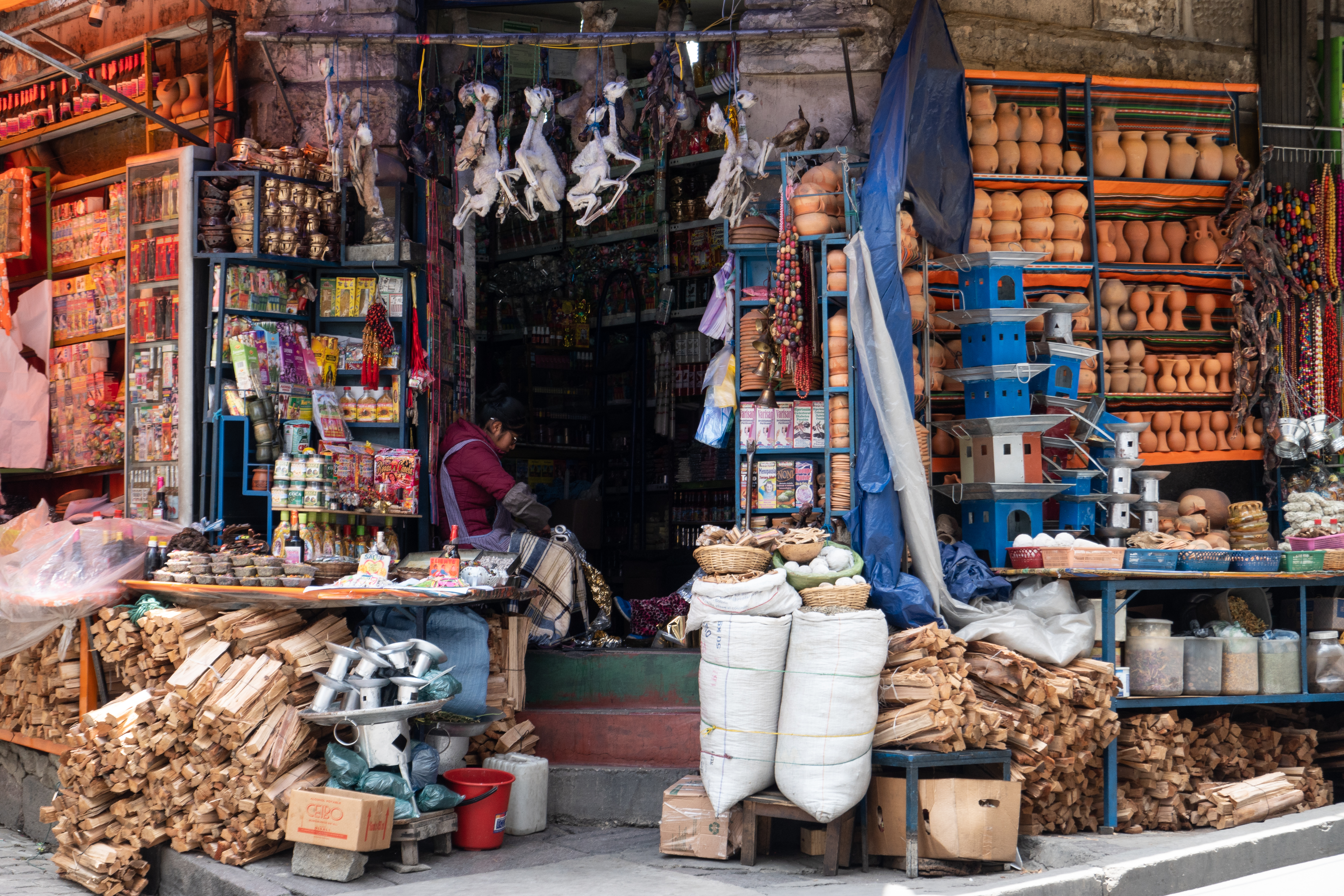
The Witches' Market in the city center, a popular spot for tourists

La Paz is an important cultural center of Bolivia. The city hosts several cathedrals belonging to the colonial times, such as the San Francisco Cathedral and the Metropolitan Cathedral, this last one located on Murillo Square, which is also home of the political and administrative power of the country. Hundreds of different museums can be found across the city, the most notable ones on Jaén Street, which street design has been preserved from the Spanish days and is home of 10 different museums.

The home of the Bolivian government is located on Murillo Square and is known as "Palacio Quemado" (Burnt Palace) as it has been on fire several times. The palace has been restored many times since, but the name has remained untouched.

=== Principal attractions ===
==== Museums and cultural centers ====
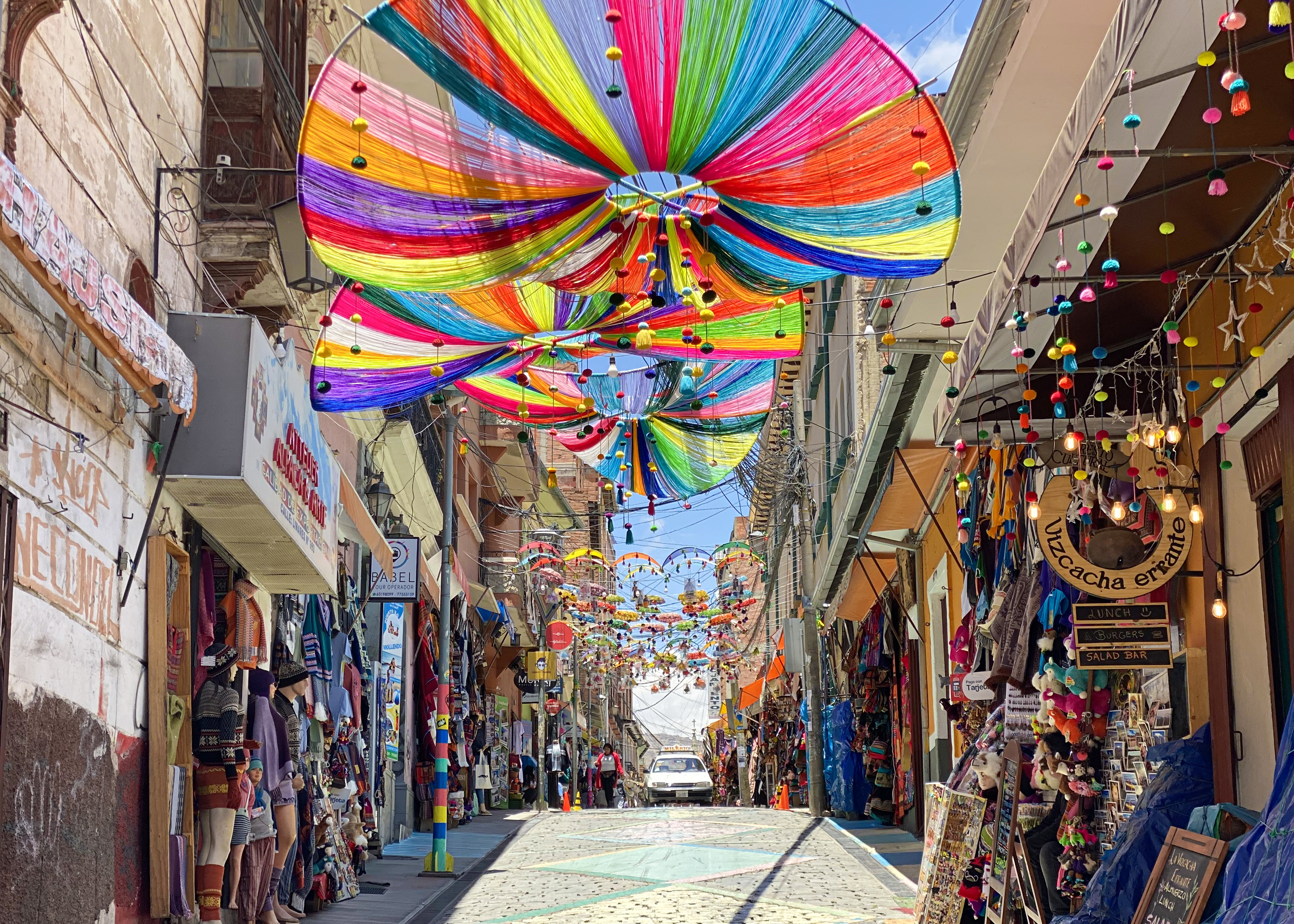
Local shops along Linares Street, a popular tourist spot in the city center

- The former home of Pedro Domingo Murillo, martyr of the independence revolution of 1809, has been preserved and is now a museum. The house displays a collection of furniture, textiles, and art from colonial times.
- Museo Costumbrista: Displays ceramic dolls wearing traditional customs that show how was life in the early 19th century. Also on display are photos of old La Paz.
- Museo Nacional de Arqueología (National Museum of Archeology): Depicts a collection of artifacts of the Tiawanaku culture.
- Museo del Litoral (Museum of the Litoral Coastal Region): Displays objects from the 1879 war in which Bolivia lost its sea coast to Chile.
- Museo del Oro (Gold Museum): Depicts pre-Conquest works made of gold, silver and copper.
- Museo de Etnografía y Folklore (Ethnography and Folkolore Museum): Located in a house built during the late 18th century, it exhibits customs and art of two ethnic groups: Chipayas and Ayoreos.
- Museo del Charango (Museum of Charango): Located in Calle Linares, the museum displays an important variety of charangos. Other native instruments are displayed as well.
- Museo de Historia Natural (Natural History Museum): Exhibits on Bolivian paleontology, geology, zoology and botanical elements of interest.
- Casa Museo Marina Nuñez del Prado (Marina Nuñez del Prado House Museum): Displays Quechua and Aymara-theme sculptures by Bolivian artist Marina Nuñez del Prado.
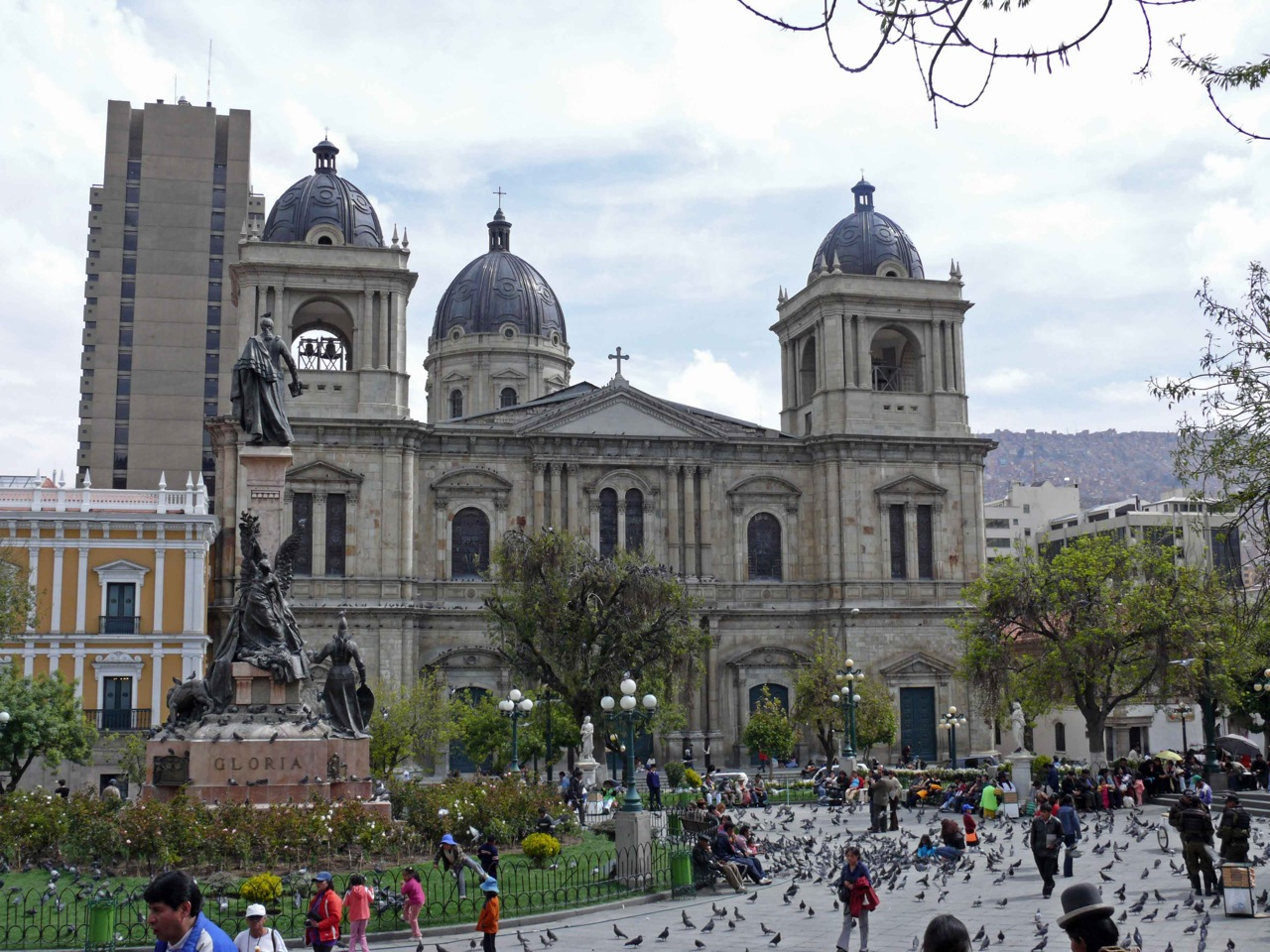
  Cathedral Basilica of Our Lady of Peace Erected in 1835.
- Museo Nacional de Arte (National Art Museum): Located in Calle Comercio, on a former palace built in 1775, displays works by Melchor Perez de Holguín and Marina Nuñez del Prado, among others.
- Mercado de Brujas (Witches' Market): Merchandise sold here includes herbs, remedies as well as other ingredients used in Aymara traditions.
- Feria de Alasitas: This fair is celebrated for two weeks each year, beginning 24 January. The central figure is a little god of abundance known as Ekeko, which means dwarf in Aymara.
- Museo San Francisco Cultural Center

==== Churches and cathedrals ====
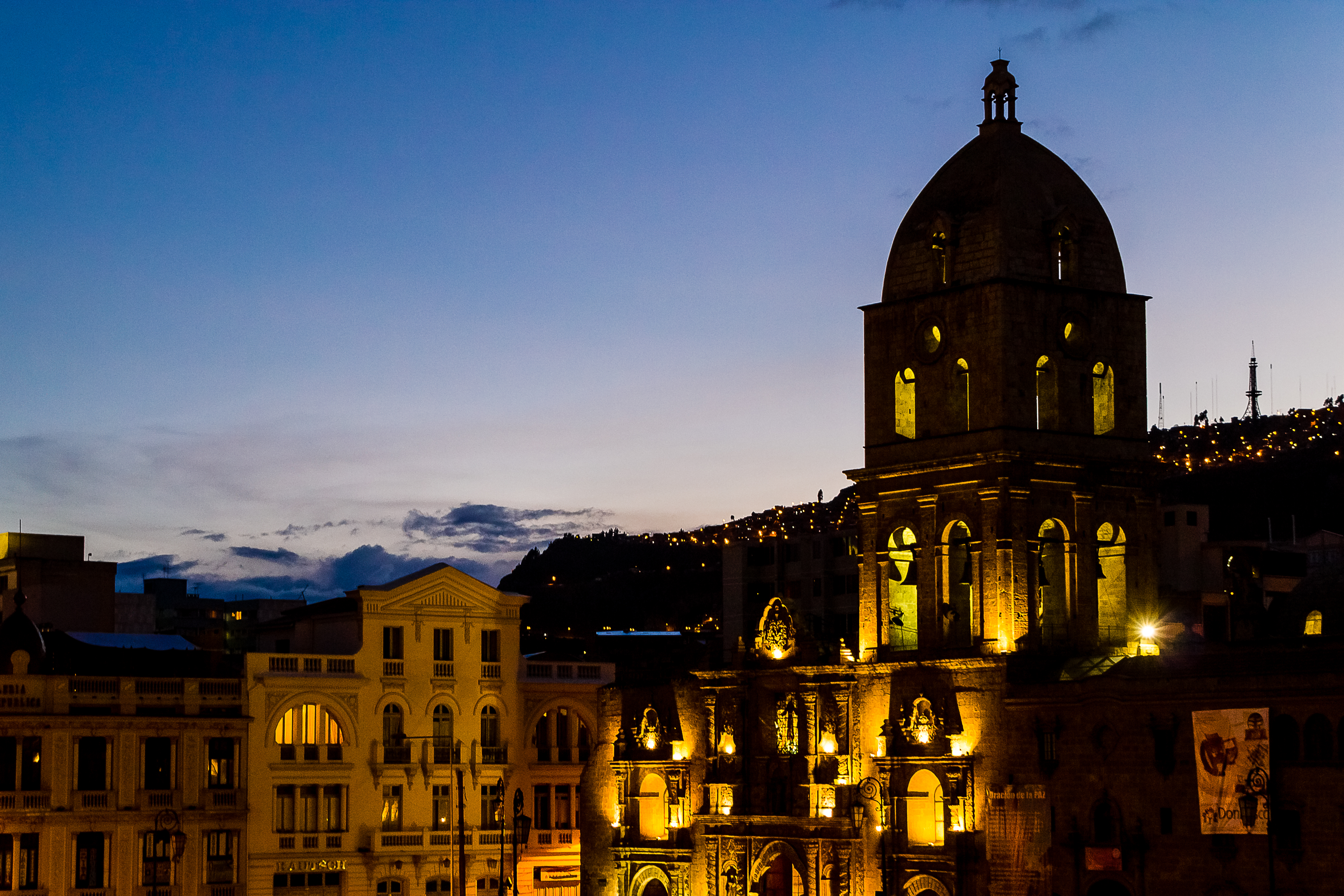
The Basilica of San Francisco, built in 1743

- Metropolitan Cathedral, built in 1835 and located next to the Presidential Palace, on Murillo Square;
- San Francisco Church, founded in 1548 and rebuilt 1784.
- San Jose of the Recoleta Church, founded in 1896 and completed in 1930.
- Parroquia Señor de la Exaltación, founded in 1956.

==== Other attractions ====
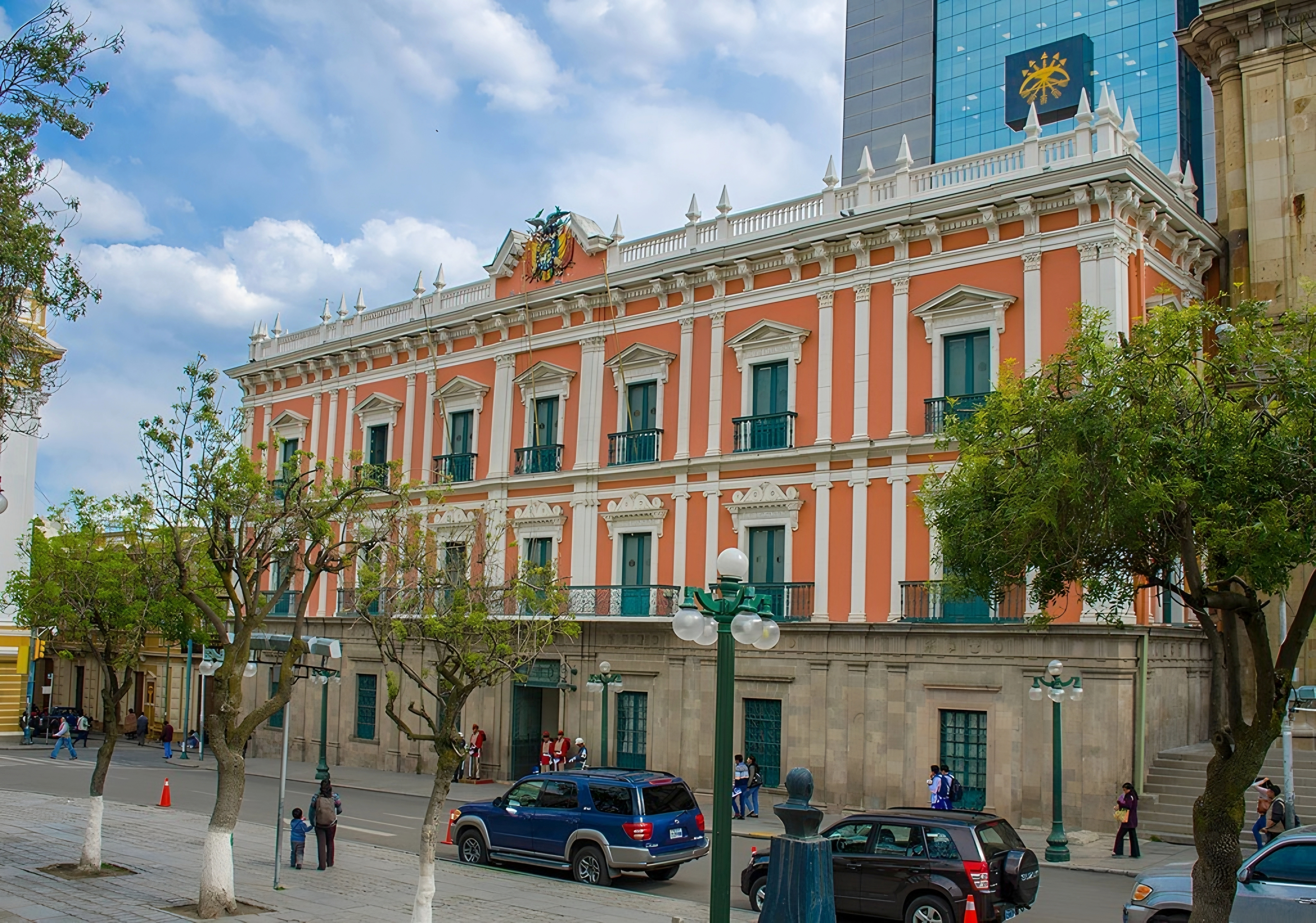
Palacio Quemado

- Bolivian Presidential Palace, also known as "Burned Palace".
- Parque Urbano Central (Central Urban Park)
- Valle de la Luna (Bolivia)
- El Montículo
- Mirador Laikakota
- Mirador Killi Killi

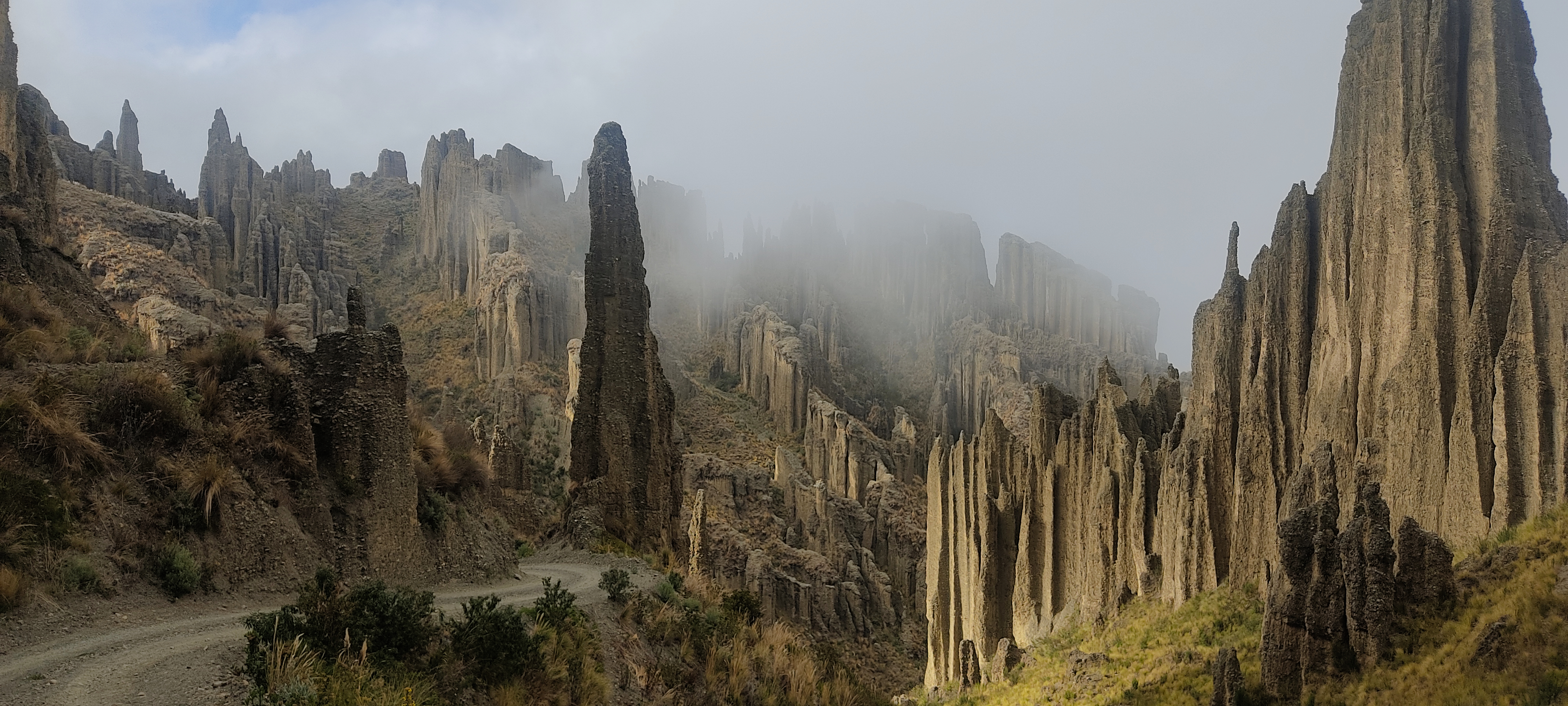
Geological formations in the "Valle de las Ánimas" on the outskirts of the city

== Food ==
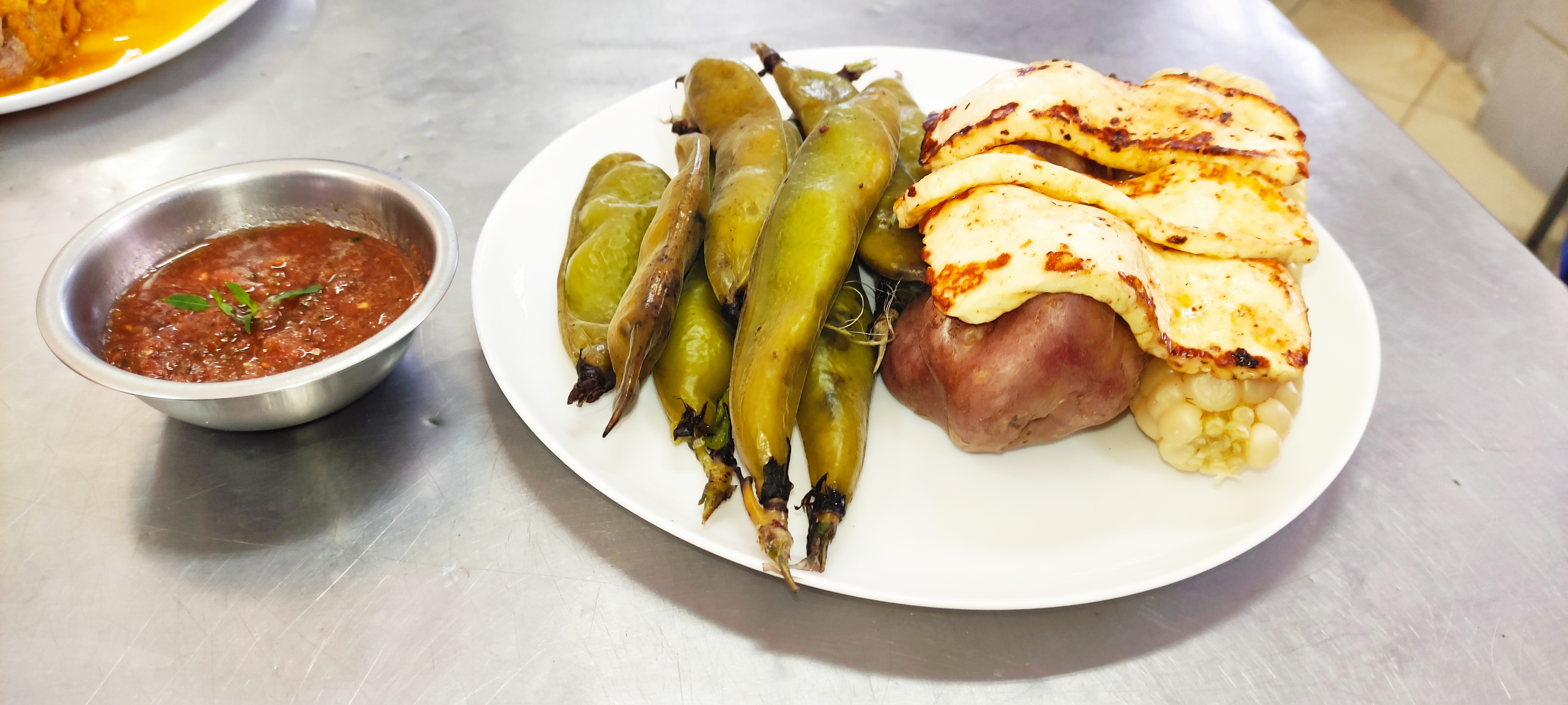
Traditional plato paceño consisting of lima beans, potatoes, white corn and fried cheese.

Popular food from La Paz includes:

- Marraqueta
- Plato Paceño
- Salteña
- Fricasé
- Picante Mixto
- Api and Pastel
- Llaucha
- Papa Rellena
- Ranga ranga
- Chairo
- Sandwich de Chola
- Anticucho
- Silpancho

== Local festivals ==
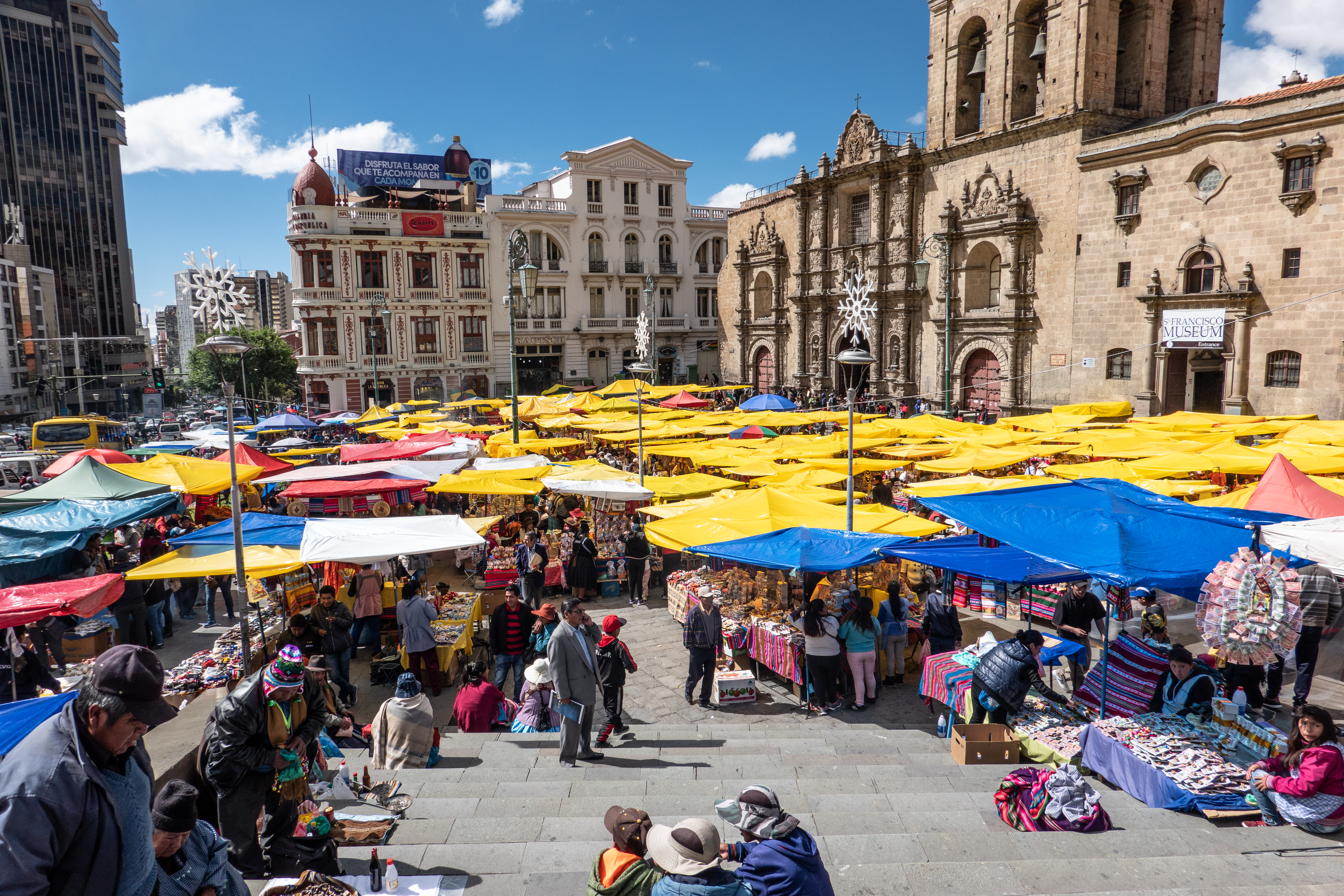
The Alasitas yearly fair, where people buy miniature gifts and pray to the God of prosperity, Ekeko

- January: Achocalla Festival: Occurs during the first week of January. The city of La Paz comes together to celebrate this religious festival with traditional dances, music, and a parade. In Bolivia's harvest calendar, Achocalla marks the time when potato fields begin to bloom. People dance the traditional folklore dance known as "tarqueada" during the festival.
- 24 January: Alasitas is a yearly fair where people buy miniature gifts and praise the god of prosperity, Ekeko. The fair begins every 24 January and lasts for a month. In 2017, it has been included into the Intangible Cultural World Heritage of UNESCO.
- 2 February: Virgen de Copacabana, (Villa Copacabana)
- 1 May: San José Obrero (V. Nuevo Potosí)
- 3 May: Señor de la Santa Cruz (Calvario, Tacagua, Calacoto)
- 13 May: Virgen de Fátima (Villa Fátima)
- 14 May: San Isidro, Labrador (San Isidro)
- 17 May: Señor de la Sentencia (Villa Armonía)
- May: Santísima Trinidad del Señor Jesús del Gran Poder (movible, Gran Poder) La Fiesta del Gran Poder occurs on Trinity Sunday. Therefore, it happens on different dates every year. But the festival typically occurs during late May to early June. This festival pays homage to El Señor del Gran Poder. During the festival, over 30,000 dancers take the streets of La Paz performing dances with themes that represent both Aymara folktales and Catholic traditions. The dancers wear colorful homemade costumes. The Parade lasts all day throughout the night. In 2019, it has been included into the Intangible Cultural World Heritage of UNESCO.
- 13 June: San Antonio de Padua (San Antonio)
- 24 June: San Juan Bautista (Valle Hermoso, San Juan)
- 29 June: San Pedro Apóstol (San Pedro)
- 16 July: Virgen del Carmen, Patroness of Bolivia and the Armed Forces of the Nation Efemerides of La Paz
- 25 July: Apóstol Santiago (Munaypata, Pampahasi, Pasankeri, Periférica, Alto Delicias)
- 15 August: Virgen de Urqupiña (Urkupiña)
- 15 August: Virgen de la Asunción (Villa Victoria)
- 8 September: Virgen de las Nieves (V. Copacabana, M. Paredes, La Portada, Achachicala, Alto Irpavi, Cotahuma, Las Nieves)
- 8 September: Virgen de los Remedios (Miraflores)
- 14 September: Señor de la Exaltación (Obrajes, G. de Lima, Bajo Tejar, Vino Tinto)
- 24 September: Virgen de la Merced (Cota Cota)
- 7 October: Virgen del Rosario (El Rosario)
- November: Cristo Rey (Pura Pura)
- 4 December: Santa Barbara (Santa Bárbara, Llojeta)
- 8 December: Virgen de la Concepción (Kupini, Sopocachi, Achumani)

== Transportation ==
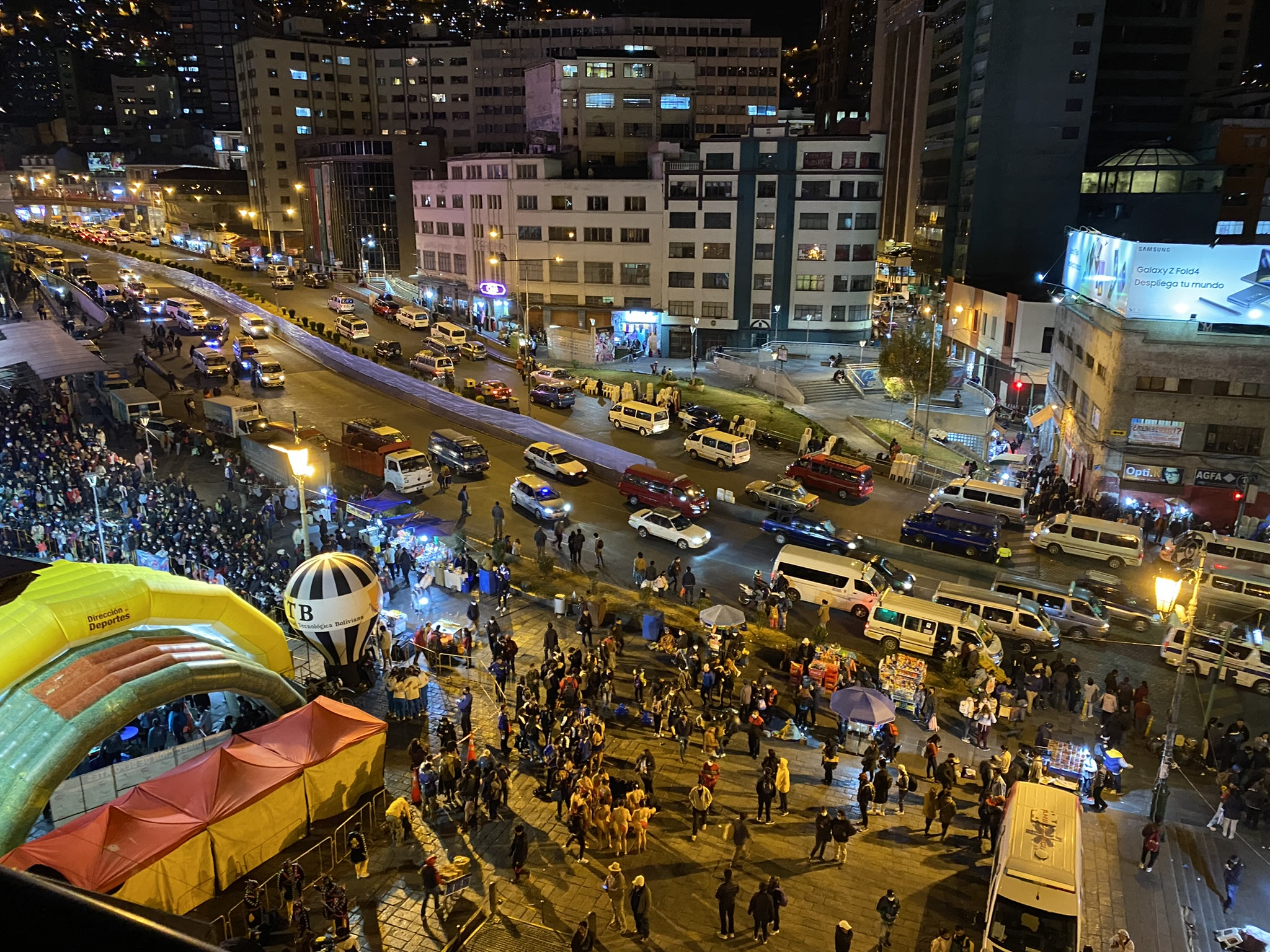
Rush hour traffic on Mariscal Santa Cruz Avenue in the city center

Automobiles and public transportation are the main means to get into the city. In March 2012, more than 1.5 million vehicles were registered. Heavy traffic is common in the city center and traffic jams occur on peak hours.

=== Highways ===
The La Paz-El Alto Highway is a toll road that connects the city of La Paz with the neighboring city of El Alto. It is the city's main highway. It allows easy access to El Alto International Airport. The highway runs 11,7 km and crosses the city of El Alto:

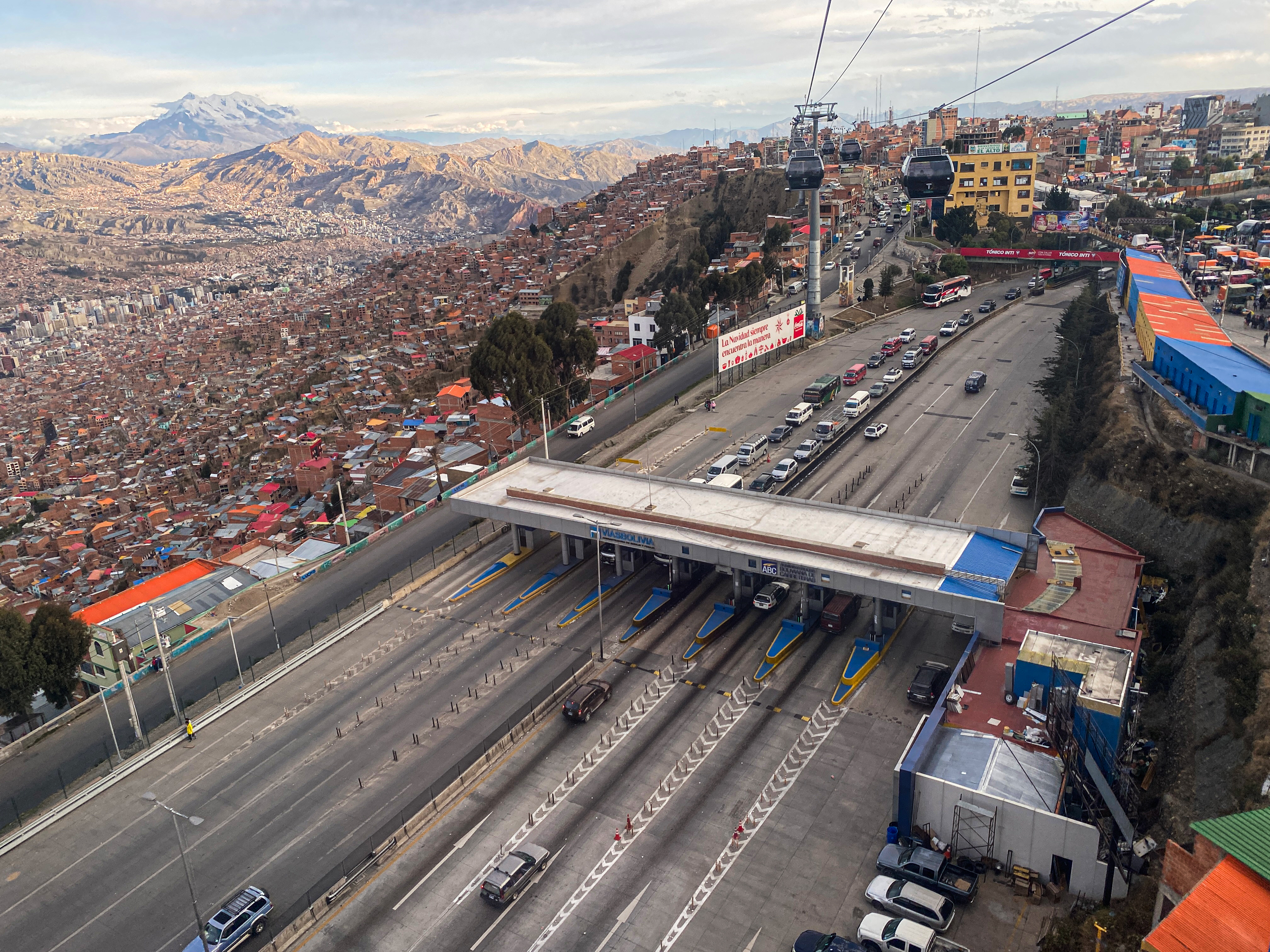
The main toll of the La Paz - El Alto highway connects both neighboring cities

- Autopista La Paz-El Alto/RN-3 (La Paz-El Alto Highway) – Connects La Paz with El Alto.
- Autovía La Paz Oruro/A-1 (La Paz-Oruro Highway) – Connects La Paz with the cities of Oruro, Patacamaya and Caracollo. It then connects with Ruta Nacional 1/RN-1 (National Highway 1) heading south to the cities of Potosí, Camargo, Tarija.

The Southern District, one of La Paz's most affluent and commercial neighborhoods, is relatively separated from the rest of the city, including the CBD. The Avenida Costanera and Avenida Kantutani (Costanera and Kantutani Avenues) connect the southern district with the rest of the metropolitan area.

=== Air ===
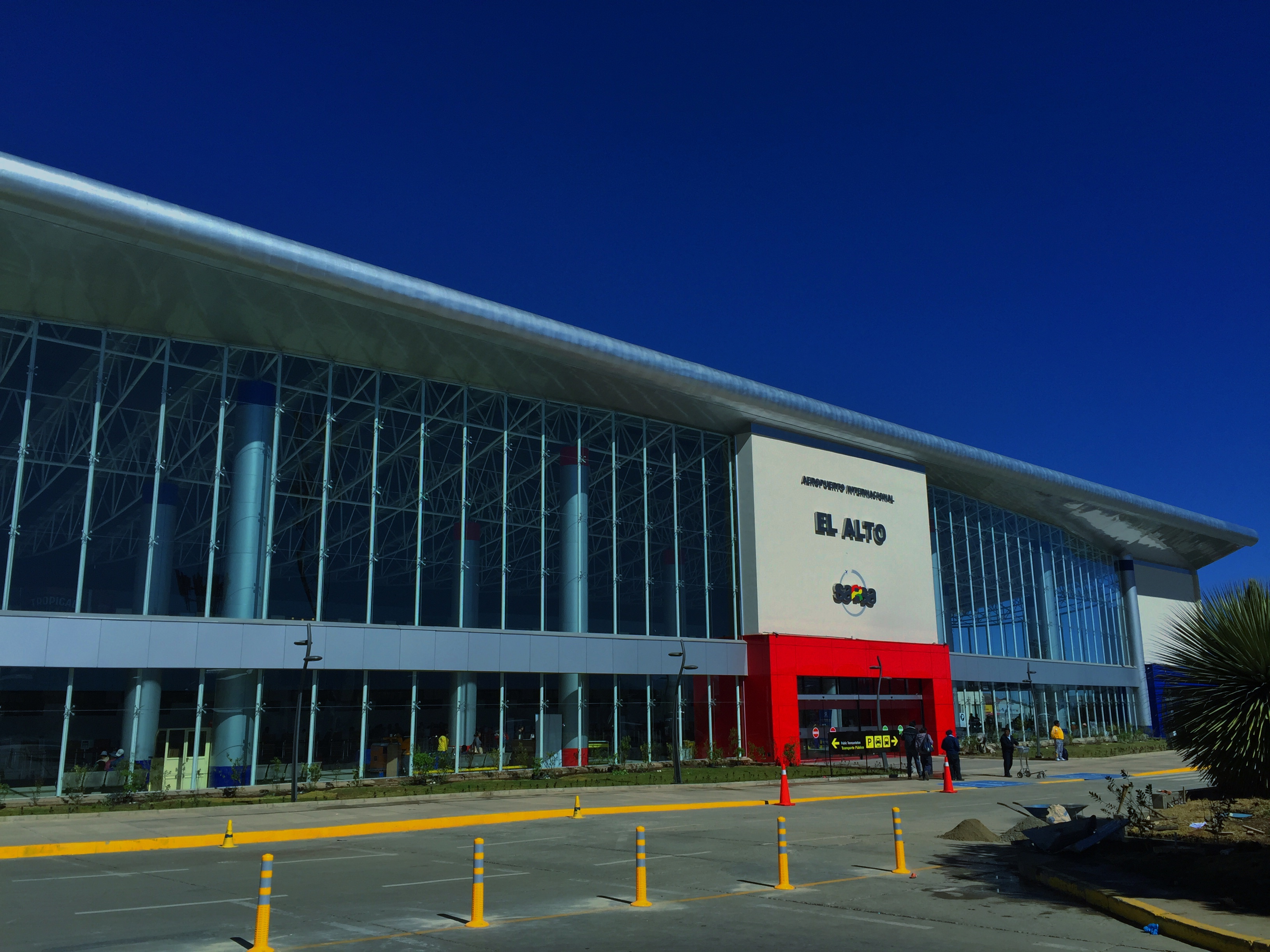
El Alto International Airport

El Alto International Airport (IATA code: LPB) is La Paz's national and international airport and a principal hub for Línea Aérea Amaszonas and Transporte Aéreo Militar. It also serves as a focus city for Boliviana de Aviación, Bolivia's flag-carrier and largest airline. The airport is located in the city of El Alto and is (13 km) south-west of La Paz's city center. At an elevation of 4,061 meters (13,323 feet), it is the highest international airport and fifth highest commercial airport in the world. The runway has a length of 4,000 meters (2.5 mi). It is one of Bolivia's three main international gateways, along with Jorge Wilstermann International Airport and Viru Viru International Airport.

International carriers serving El Alto International Airport include Avianca and LATAM Airlines, which offer direct flights from La Paz to cities such as Bogotá, Lima, and Santiago. However, most international traffic, including flights to Europe, operated out of Viru Viru International Airport in Santa Cruz de la Sierra which is at a much lower altitude and is capable of handling larger aircraft.

Additionally, the airport supplies travelers with oxygen for those who suffer from altitude sickness.

=== Bus ===
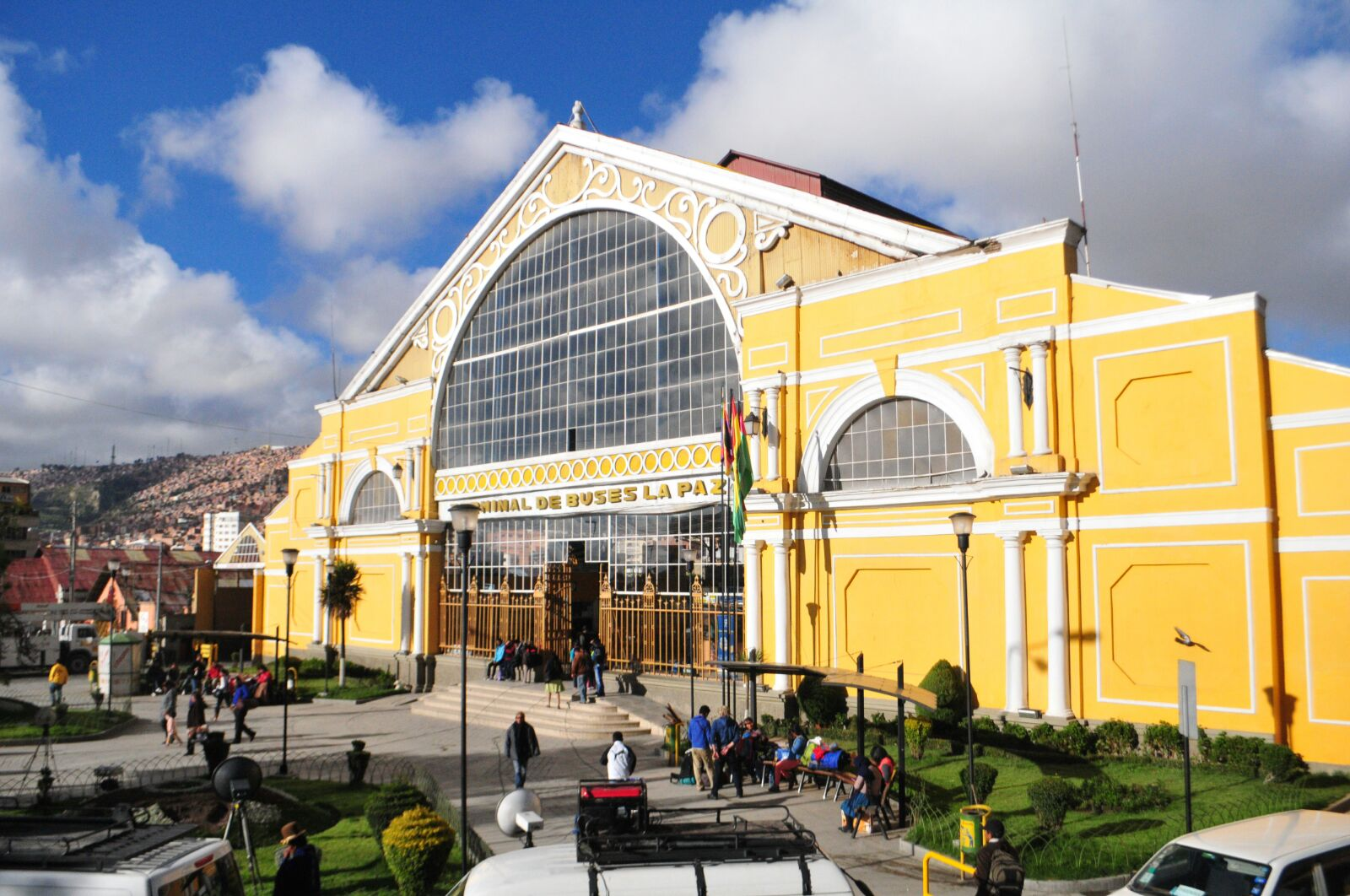
The La Paz Bus Station

La Paz Bus Station, originally a bus and train station, was built by the French architect Gustave Eiffel. It is the main gateway for inter-city buses with several daily departures to all the main Bolivian cities, and routes to Chile and Peru. The city is connected by road with the city of Oruro from where there are routes to Sucre, Potosí and the south of the country. Another highway branches off before Oruro to reach Cochabamba and Santa Cruz. Roads to the west go to Copacabana and Tiwanaku, near Lake Titicaca, and continue to Cuzco, Peru via the border town of Desaguadero. There are also roads north to get to Yungas crossing the Andes Mountains.

Departures to smaller cities and towns within the department use informal stations located in Villa Fátima (departures to Los Yungas, Beni and Pando), Upper San Pedro (for Apolo) and near the General Cemetery (for Copacabana, Lake Titicaca, or via Tiwanaku to Desaguadero on the Peruvian border).

=== Cable car system ===
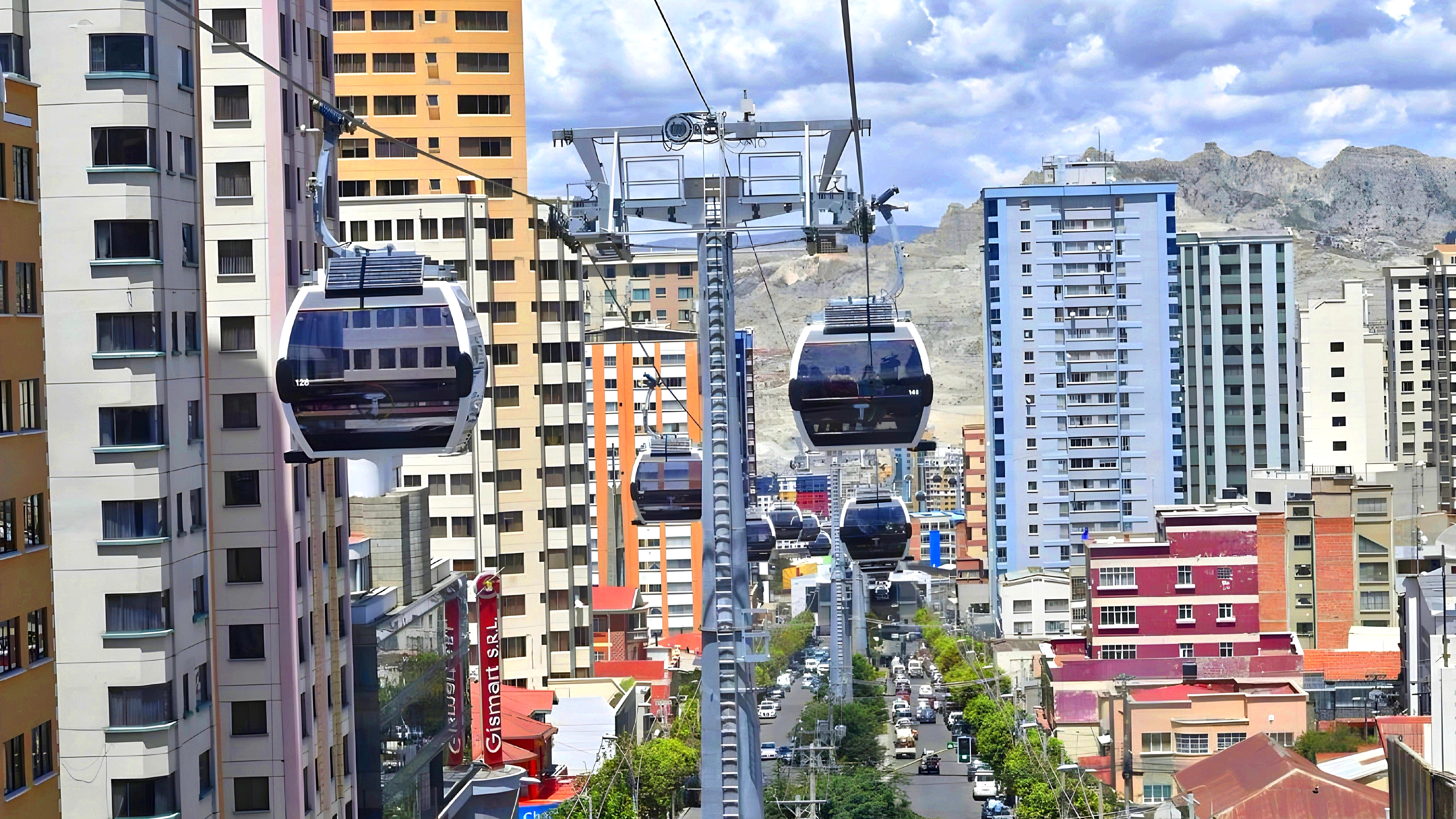
The Mi Teleférico transit network is the largest aerial cable car urban transit system in the world.

A system of urban transit aerial cable cars called Mi Teleférico ("My Cable Car") was opened in 2014. Eight lines are in operation, and three more lines are in the planning stage. The initial three lines were built by the Austrian company Doppelmayr. The first two lines (Red and Yellow) connected La Paz with El Alto. All stations have both a Spanish name and an Aymara name.

Cable car system La Paz
Line	Length	Travel time	Stations	opened
Red Line	2.4 km	10 min	3	May 2014
Yellow Line	3.9 km	13.5 min	4	September 2014
Green Line	3.7 km	16.6 min	4	December 2014
Blue Line	4.7 km	17 min	5	March 2017
Orange Line	2.6 km	10 min	4	September 2017
White Line	2.9 km	13.1 min	4	March 2018
Sky Blue Line	2.6 km	11.8 min	4	July 2018
Purple Line	4.3 km	16.2 min	3	September 2018

== Communications and media ==
- The postal service is run by ECOBOL (National Company) which has its headquarters in La Paz. There are other companies offering courier and transport logistics courier nationally and internationally.
- The private telecommunications company 'Entel' is located in the city and provides telephony, Internet, cell phone, data and voice services. The telephone cooperative Cotel is responsible for managing much of their phones and now offers Internet services and cable television among others.
- Area Code: 2
- Country Code: 591
- The main daily newspapers in circulation are: Página Siete, La Razon, El Diario, La Prensa, Jornada and El Alteño. Other papers of local importance are: Extra and Gente. There are also several other publications and weekly magazines.
- There are 18 television channels with offices in La Paz. Channel 7 is state property. The main ones are: Unitel, ATB Bolivia, Red Uno, Bolivision, Red PAT. Channel 13 is managed by the Universidad Mayor de San Andres. Two local companies offer cable television service as Multivision and Cotel TV.

== Water supply ==
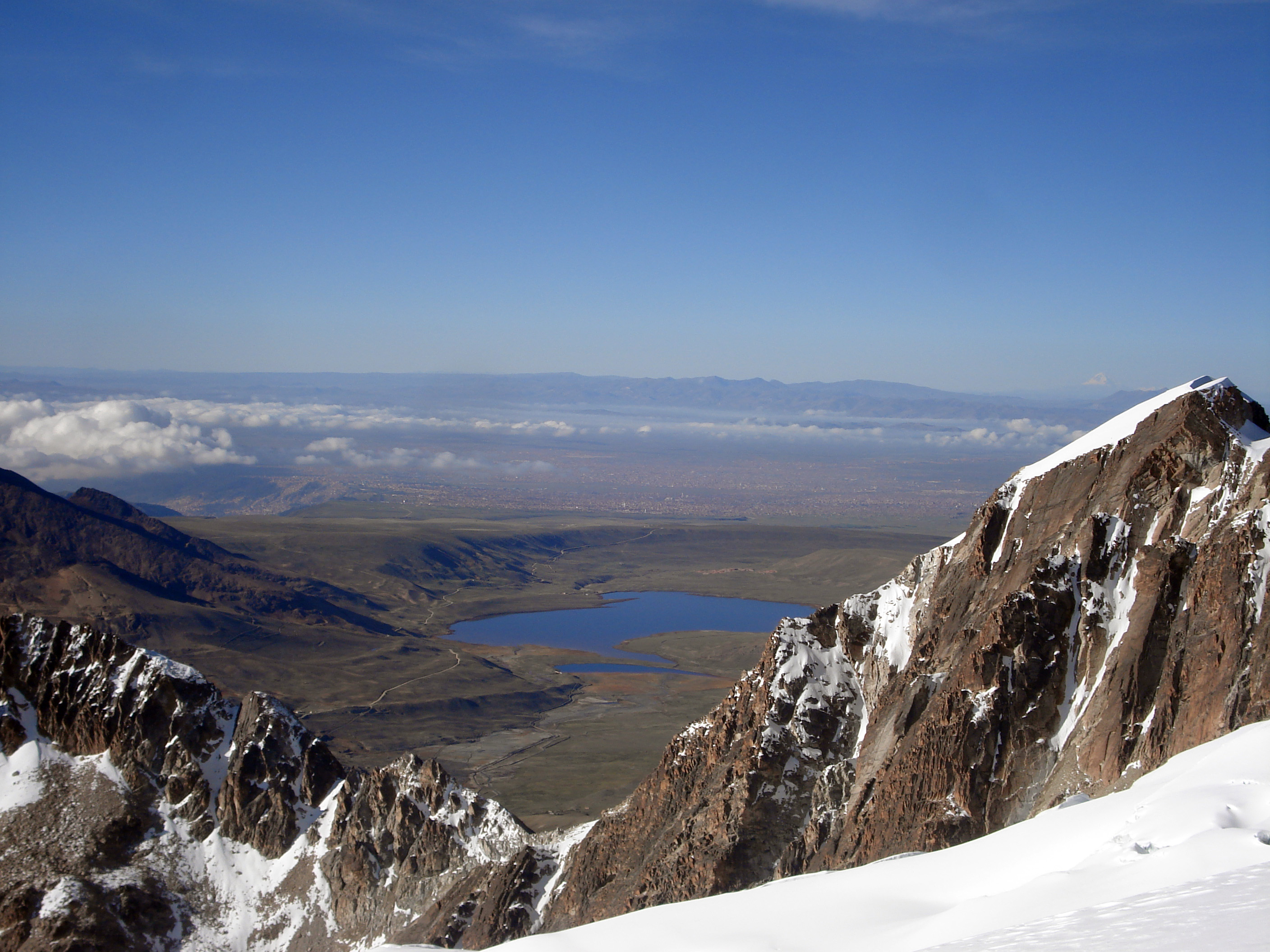
La Paz gets its main water supply from nearby lakes fed by the glaciers of the Andes Mountains

The water supply of La Paz is threatened by the impact of climate change through the melting of glaciers. The city receives its drinking water from three water systems: El Alto, Achachicala and Pampahasi. La Paz shares the first and largest of these systems with its sister city El Alto. All three systems are fed by glaciers and rivers in the Cordillera mountain range. 20–28% of its water is fed by glaciers, the remainder coming from rainfall and snowmelt. The glaciers recede as a result of climate change, initially increasing water availability during the dry season, but ultimately threatening a substantial decrease in dry season run-off when they completely disappear. A small glacier, the Chacaltaya near El Alto, already disappeared in 2008. The El Alto system receives its water from the Tuni Dam and two water channels. These channels divert water that flows from the Zongo Glacier on the slopes of Huayna Potosi and from Condoriri North of El Alto. The 2.9 km long Zongo glacier retreats at a rate of about 18 meters per year. The Tuni and Condoriri glaciers have lost 39% of their area between 1983 and 2006. According to a study by the Stockholm Environment Institute (SEI), the El Alto system is the least resilient against the impact of climate change among the three systems. The study says that reducing water distribution losses is the most effective short-term strategy to deal with water scarcity. New water sources further to the North in the Cordillera include the Khara Kota and Taypicacha, but they are expensive to develop and their water supply is also affected by glacier melt.

== International relations ==
La Paz is part of the Union of Ibero-American Capital Cities from 12 October 1982.

La Paz is also a member of Merco Ciudades, a group of 180 cities within Mercosur, since 1999.

=== Twin towns – sister cities ===
La Paz is twinned with:

- Asunción, Paraguay
- Bogotá, Colombia
- Bonn, Germany
- Canelones, Uruguay
- Havana, Cuba
- Libertador (Caracas), Venezuela
- Montevideo, Uruguay
- Moscow, Russia
- Quito, Ecuador
- Rio de Janeiro, Brazil
- São Paulo, Brazil
- Taipei, Taiwan
- Zaragoza, Spain

== Notable people ==
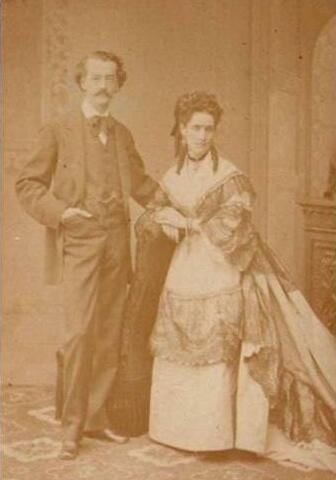
Daniel Nuñez del Prado 1865

- Luis Arce (born 1963), politician
- Alcides Arguedas (1879–1946), writer and philosopher
- Yolanda Bedregal (1916–1999), poet and novelist, known as Yolanda de Bolivia
- Armin Franulic (1943–2021), rally driver
- Rodolfo Illanes (1958–2016), lawyer and politician
- Carlos Mesa (born 1953), former president of Bolivia
- Víctor Montoya (born 1958), writer
- Daniel Nuñez del Prado (1840–1891), Secretary of State, freedom fighter and doctor
- Wilfred von Oven (1912–2008), press officer at the Reich Propaganda Ministry, journalist
- Verona Pooth born, Feldbusch (born 1968), German presenter and businesswoman
- Andrés de Santa Cruz (1792–1865), President of Peru and Bolivia
- Luis Adolfo Siles Salinas (1925–2005), lawyer, politician and former President of Bolivia
- Gualberto Vega (d. 1980 at La Paz), Bolivian trade unionist
- Alberto Villalpando (born 1940), composer
- Emilio Villanueva (1882–1970), architect

== Image gallery ==
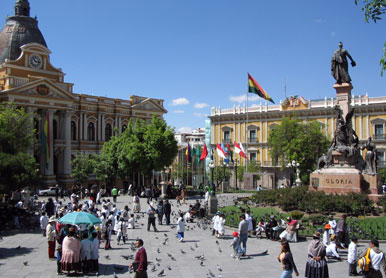
Plaza Murillo with Government and Legislative Palaces in the background.

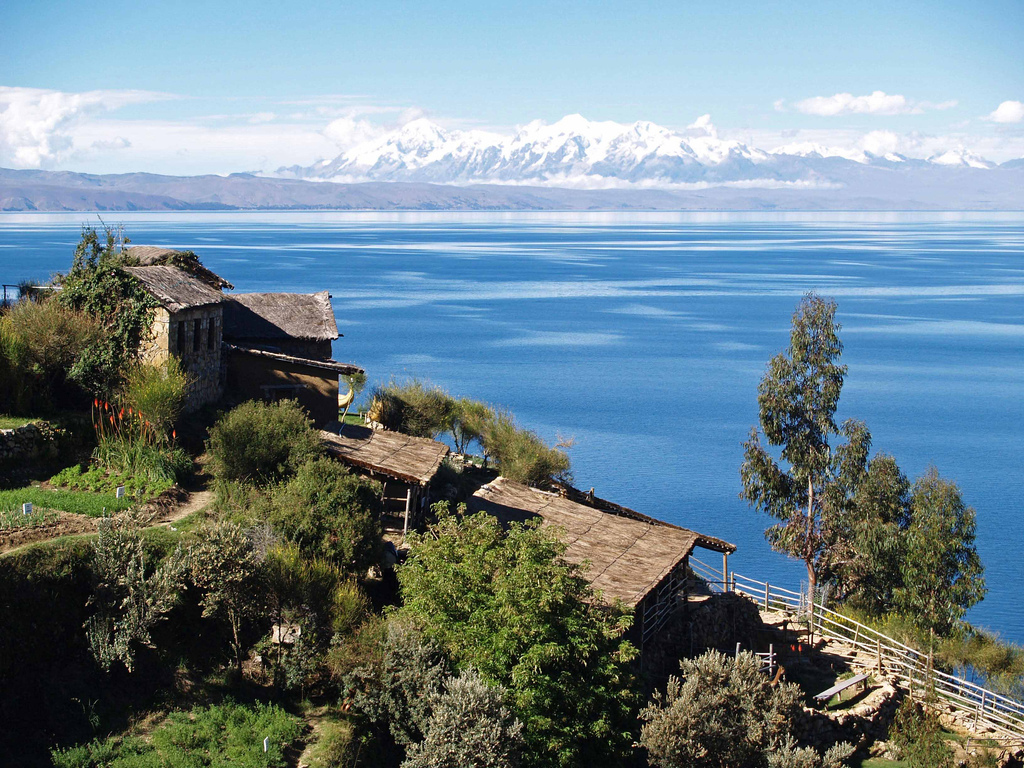
Titicaca Lake near La Paz with the Andes in the background.

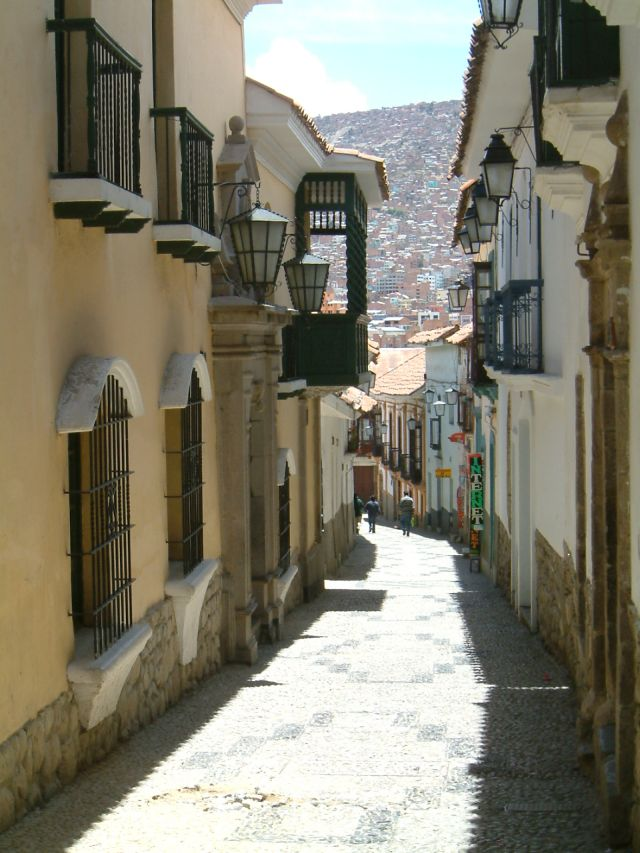
Calle Jaén.

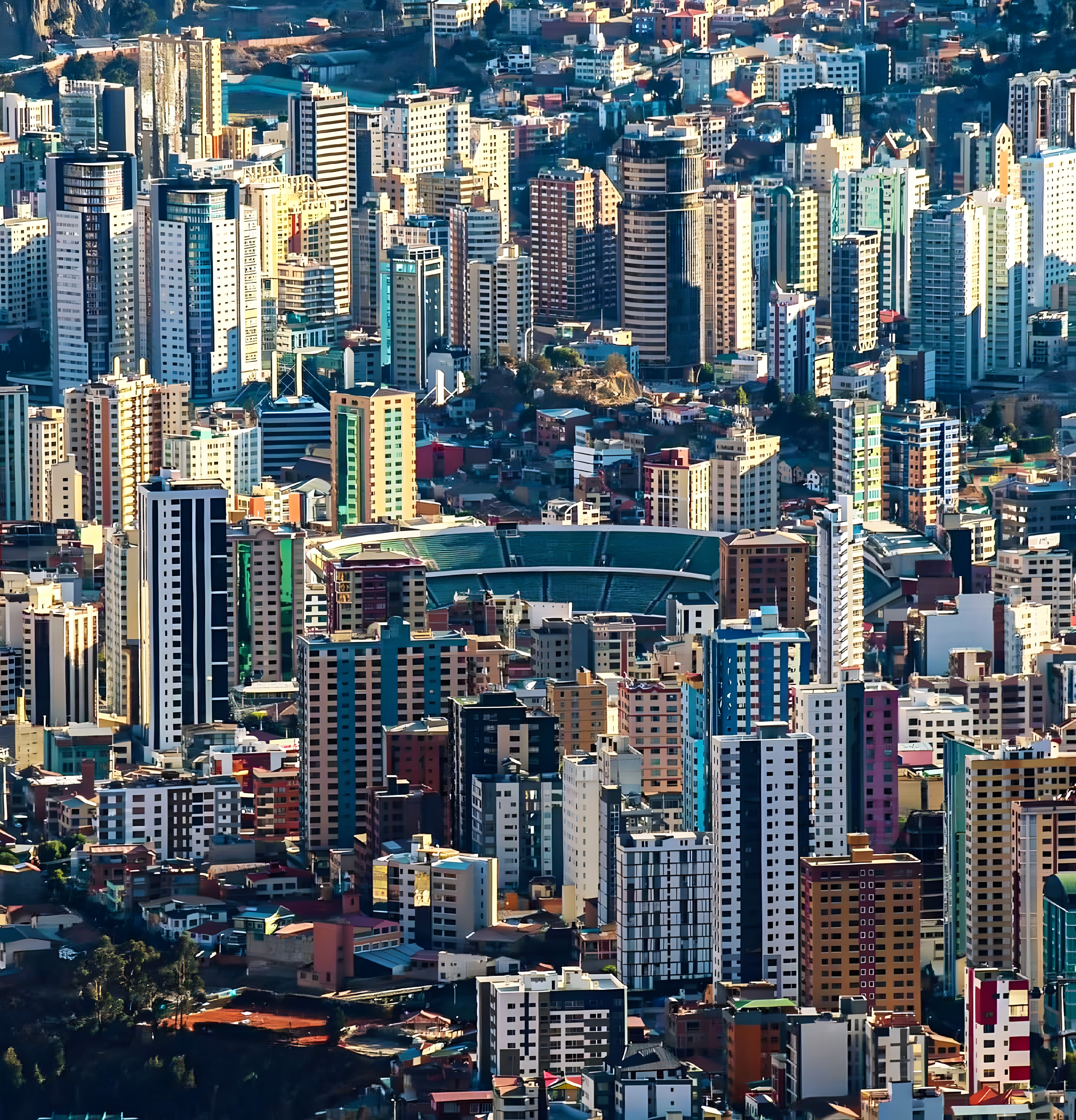
Buildings in La Paz.

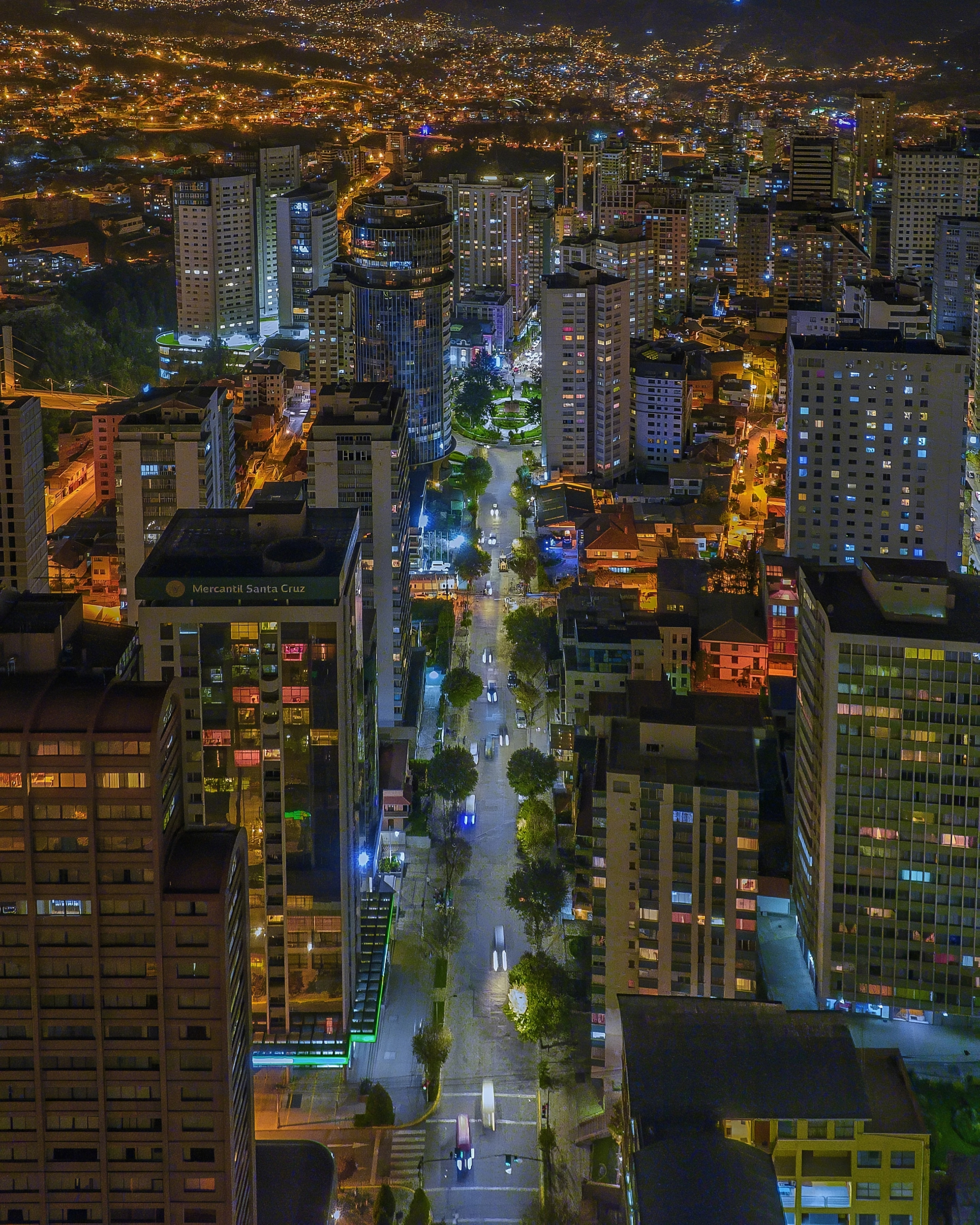
La Paz at night.

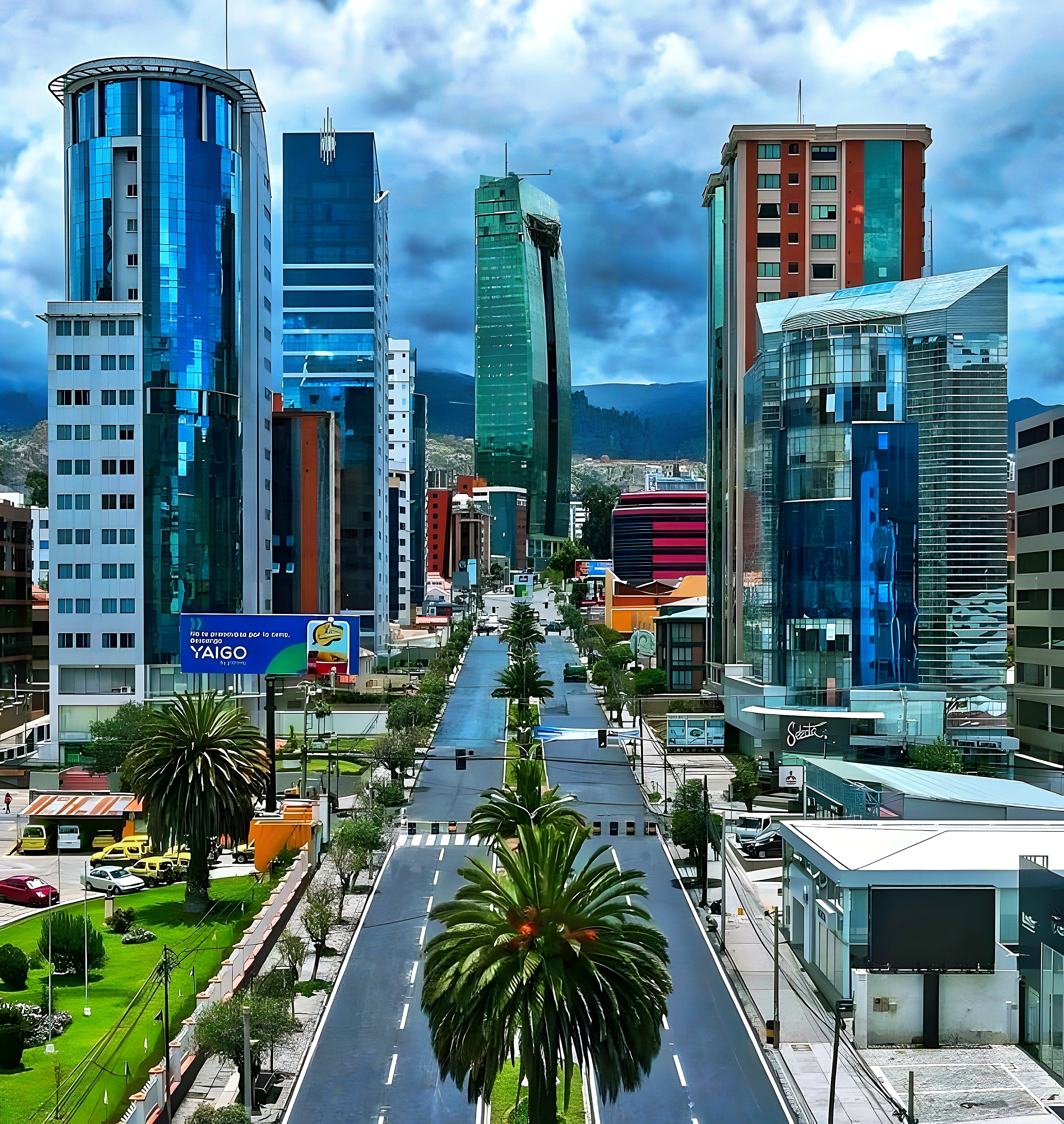
Skyline of the Calacoto neighborhood

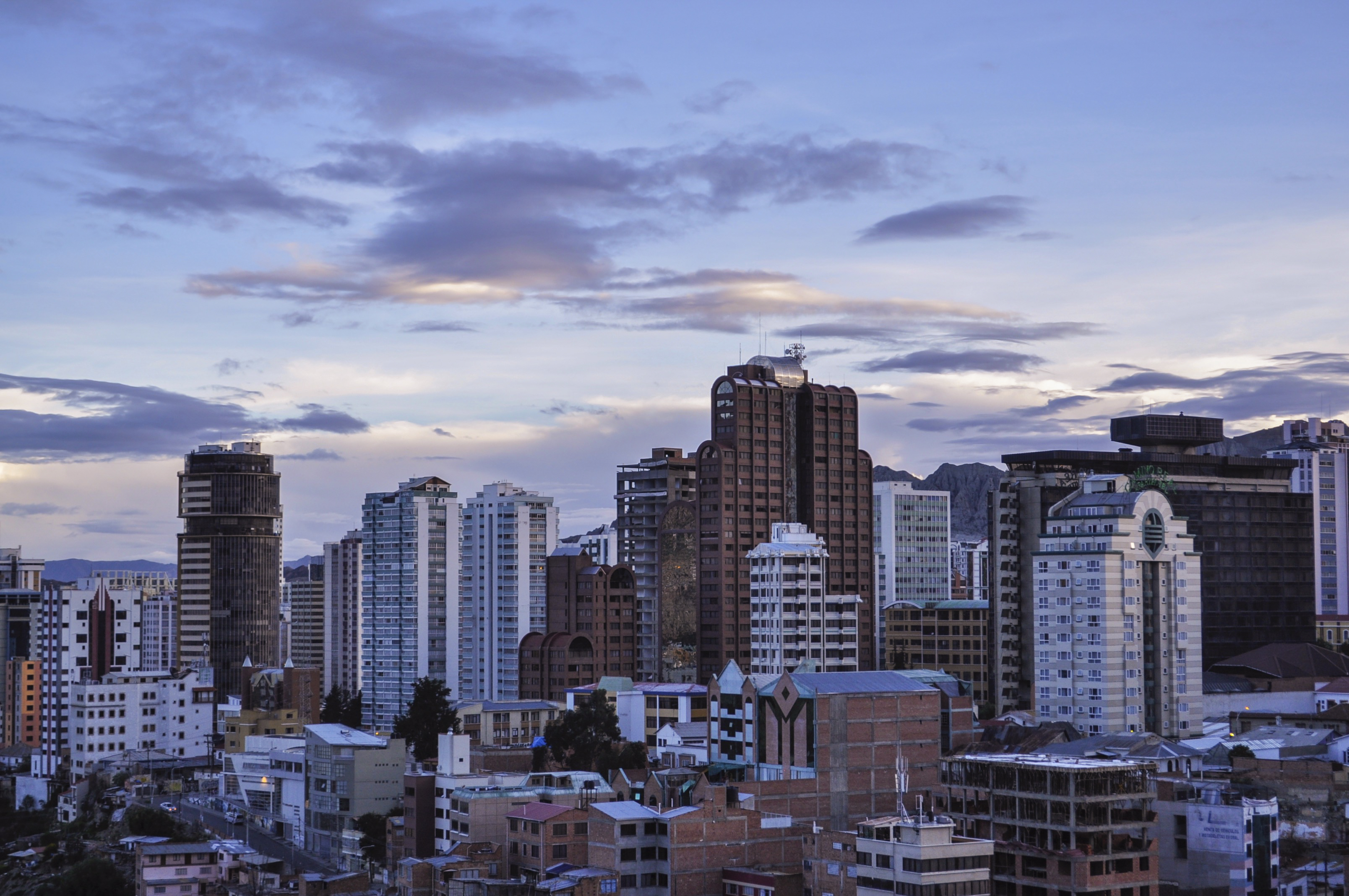
Skyline of Downtown La Paz

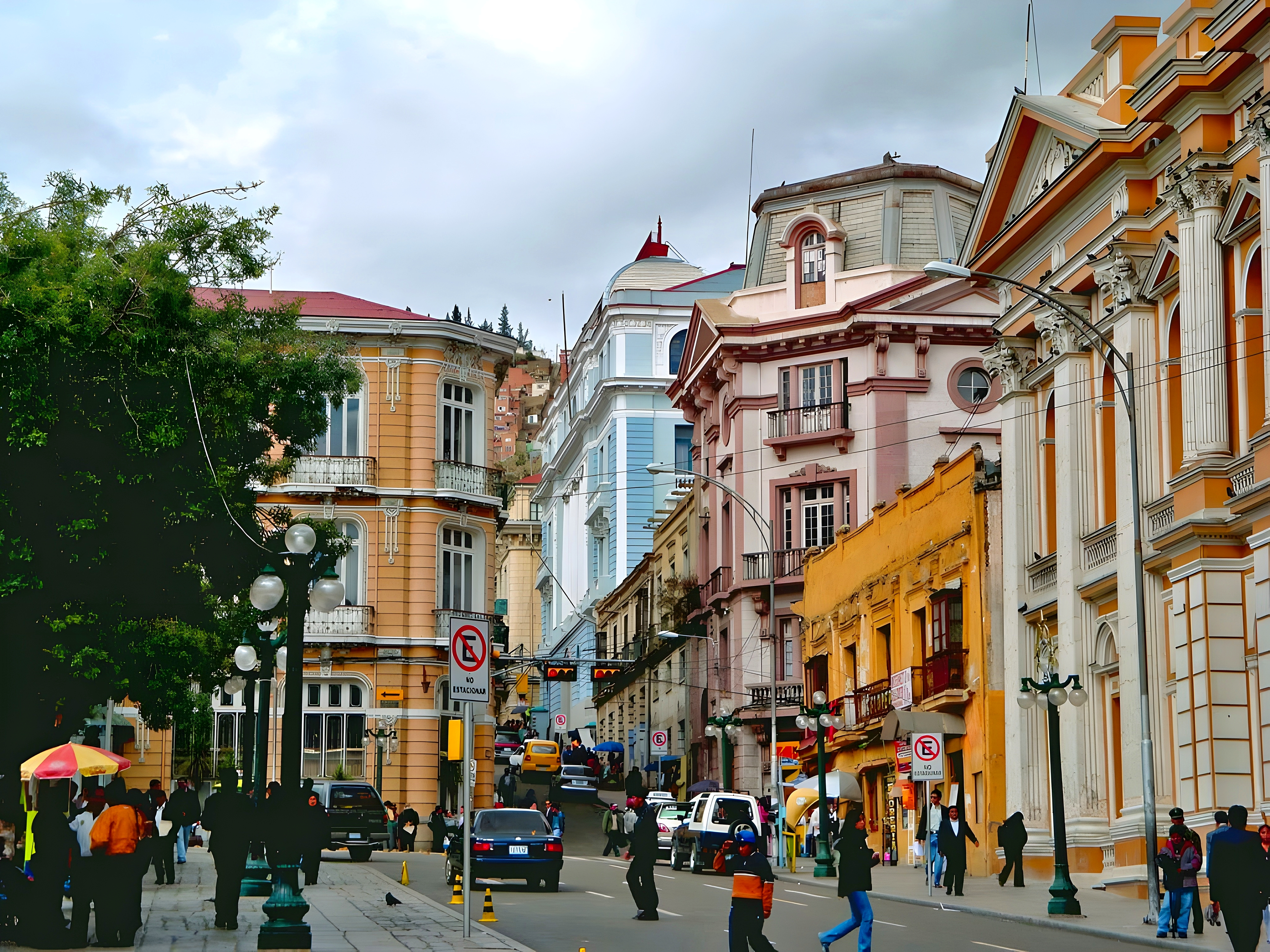
Historic buildings in La Paz

== See also ==
- 1008 La Paz
- Paceña
