= March 23 =

March 23 this year in various calendars
- Monday, 23 March 2026
| Akan | Monodwo |
| Armenian | 6 Ahekani 1475 |
| Aztec | Huei Tecuilhuitl 12, 8 Xōchitl |
| Babylonian | 3 Adaru, 2336 SE |
| Balinese pawukon | Menga, Kajeng, Menala, Wage, Maulu, Coma of Dukut, Yama, Erangan, Dewa |
| Bengali | 9 Chaitro, BS 1432 |
| Chinese | Yang Fire Monkey・Net Mansion; Fire Horse Year, Month 2, Day 5 (Chunfen, 13 days until Qingming) |
| Common Era | 23 March 2026 CE |
| Coptic | 14 Paremhat, AM 1742 |
| Egyptian | 11 Mesori, 2774 NE |
| Ethiopian | 14 Magābit, 2018 Amätä Məhrät |
| French Republican | Décade I, Tridi de Germinal de l'Année 234 de la République |
| Gregorian | 23 March, AD 2026 |
| Hebrew | 5 Nisan, AM 5786 |
| Hindu | Kṛttikā・Viṣkambha; Solar: 10 Caitra, 1947 SE; Lunisolar: Pañcamī, Śukla pakṣa of Caitra, 2083 VE; Rāudra・5126 KY・1,872,657 |
| Icelandic | Mánudagur, 30 Góa 2025 |
| Islamic | 4 Shawwal, AH 1447 (using tabular method) |
| ISO week date | 2026-W13-1 |
| Japanese | 5 Kisaragi, Reiwa 8 (Shunbun, 13 days until Seimei) |
| Julian | 10 March, AD 2026 (AM 7534) |
| Julian day | 2461123 |
| Korean | 5 Tokkidal, 4359 DE |
| Maya | 13.0.13.8.0; 18 Cumku, 8 Ahau |
| Roman | ante diem VI Idus Martias, MMDCCLXXIX AUC |
| Solar Hijri | 3 Farvardin, SH 1405 |
| Tibetan | 5 dbo, me pho rta 2153 or 1772 or 1000 |

| << | March | | | | | >> |
| Su | Mo | Tu | We | Th | Fr | Sa |
| 1 | 2 | 3 | 4 | 5 | 6 | 7 |
| 8 | 9 | 10 | 11 | 12 | 13 | 14 |
| 15 | 16 | 17 | 18 | 19 | 20 | 21 |
| 22 | 23 | 24 | 25 | 26 | 27 | 28 |
| 29 | 30 | 31 |
2026

March 23 in recent years
2026 (Monday)
2025 (Sunday)
2024 (Saturday)
2023 (Thursday)
2022 (Wednesday)
2021 (Tuesday)
2020 (Monday)
2019 (Saturday)
2018 (Friday)
2017 (Thursday)

March 23 is the 82nd day of the year (83rd in leap years) in the Gregorian calendar; 283 days remain until the end of the year.

== Events ==
=== Pre-1600 ===
- 625 – The Muslim army under Muhammad suffers a defeat against the Quraysh in the battle of Uhud.
- 1400 – The Trần dynasty of Vietnam is deposed, after one hundred and seventy-five years of rule, by Hồ Quý Ly, a court official.
- 1540 – Waltham Abbey in England is surrendered to King Henry VIII, the last religious community to be closed during the Dissolution of the Monasteries.
- 1568 – The Peace of Longjumeau is signed, ending the second phase of the French Wars of Religion.

=== 1601–1900 ===
- 1775 – American Revolutionary War: Patrick Henry delivers his speech – "Give me liberty or give me death!" – at St. John's Episcopal Church, Richmond, Virginia.
- 1801 – Tsar Paul I of Russia is struck with a sword, then strangled, and finally trampled to death inside his bedroom at St. Michael's Castle.
- 1806 – After traveling through the Louisiana Purchase and reaching the Pacific Ocean, explorers Lewis and Clark and their Corps of Discovery begin their arduous journey home.
- 1821 – Greek War of Independence: Battle and fall of city of Kalamata.
- 1839 – A massive earthquake destroys the former capital Inwa of the Konbaung dynasty, present-day Myanmar.
- 1848 – The ship John Wickliffe arrives at Port Chalmers carrying the first Scottish settlers for Dunedin, New Zealand. Otago province is founded.
- 1857 – Elisha Otis's first elevator is installed at 488 Broadway New York City.
- 1862 – American Civil War: The First Battle of Kernstown, Virginia, marks the start of Stonewall Jackson's Valley Campaign. Although a Confederate defeat, the engagement distracts Federal efforts to capture Richmond.
- 1868 – The University of California is founded in Oakland, California when the Organic Act is signed into law.
- 1879 – War of the Pacific: The Battle of Topáter, the first battle of the war, is fought between Chile and the joint forces of Bolivia and Peru.
- 1885 – Sino-French War: Chinese victory in the Battle of Phu Lam Tao near Hưng Hóa, northern Vietnam.
- 1888 – In England, The Football League, the world's oldest professional association football league, meets for the first time.
- 1889 – The Ahmadiyya Muslim Community is established by Mirza Ghulam Ahmad in Qadian, British India.

=== 1901–present ===
- 1901 – Emilio Aguinaldo, only President of the First Philippine Republic, is captured at Palanan, Isabela by the forces of American General Frederick Funston.
- 1905 – Eleftherios Venizelos calls for Crete's union with Greece, and begins what is to be known as the Theriso revolt.
- 1909 – Theodore Roosevelt leaves New York for a post-presidency safari in Africa. The trip is sponsored by the Smithsonian Institution and National Geographic Society.
- 1913 – A tornado outbreak kills more than 240 people in the central United States, while an ongoing flood in the Ohio River watershed was killing 650 people.
- 1918 – First World War: On the third day of the German Spring Offensive, the 10th Battalion of the Royal West Kent Regiment is annihilated with many of the men becoming prisoners of war.
- 1919 – In Milan, Italy, Benito Mussolini founds his Fascist political movement.
- 1931 – Bhagat Singh, Shivaram Rajguru and Sukhdev Thapar are hanged for the killing of a deputy superintendent of police during the Indian independence movement.
- 1933 – The Reichstag passes the Enabling Act of 1933, making Adolf Hitler dictator of Germany.
- 1935 – Signing of the Constitution of the Commonwealth of the Philippines.
- 1939 – The Hungarian air force attacks the headquarters of the Slovak air force in Spišská Nová Ves, killing 13 people and beginning the Slovak–Hungarian War.
- 1940 – The Lahore Resolution (Qarardad-e-Pakistan or Qarardad-e-Lahore) is put forward at the Annual General Convention of the All-India Muslim League.
- 1956 – Pakistan becomes the first Islamic republic in the world. This date is now celebrated as Republic Day in Pakistan.
- 1965 – NASA launches Gemini 3, the United States' first two-man space flight (crew: Gus Grissom and John Young).
- 1977 – The first of The Nixon Interviews (12 will be recorded over four weeks) is videotaped with British journalist David Frost interviewing former United States President Richard Nixon about the Watergate scandal and the Nixon tapes.
- 1978 – The first UNIFIL troops arrive in Lebanon for a peacekeeping mission along the Blue Line.
- 1980 – Archbishop Óscar Romero of El Salvador gives his famous speech appealing to men of the El Salvadoran armed forces to stop killing the Salvadorans.
- 1982 – Guatemala's government, headed by Fernando Romeo Lucas García, is overthrown in a military coup by right-wing General Efraín Ríos Montt.
- 1983 – Strategic Defense Initiative: President Ronald Reagan makes his initial proposal to develop technology to intercept enemy missiles.
- 1988 – Angolan and Cuban forces defeat South Africa in the Battle of Cuito Cuanavale.
- 1991 – The Revolutionary United Front, with support from the special forces of Charles Taylor's National Patriotic Front of Liberia, invades Sierra Leone in an attempt to overthrow Joseph Saidu Momoh, sparking the 11-year Sierra Leone Civil War.
- 1994 – At an election rally in Tijuana, Mexican presidential candidate Luis Donaldo Colosio is assassinated by Mario Aburto Martínez.
- 1994 – A United States Air Force (USAF) F-16 aircraft collides with a USAF C-130 at Pope Air Force Base and then crashes, killing 24 United States Army soldiers on the ground alongside destroying a Starlifter by accident. This later became known as the Green Ramp disaster.
- 1994 – Aeroflot Flight 593 crashes into the Kuznetsk Alatau mountain, Kemerovo Oblast, Russia, killing 75.
- 1996 – Taiwan holds its first direct elections and chooses Lee Teng-hui as President.
- 1999 – Gunmen assassinate Paraguay's Vice President Luis María Argaña.
- 2001 – The Russian Mir space station is disposed of, breaking up in the atmosphere before falling into the southern Pacific Ocean near Fiji.
- 2003 – Battle of Nasiriyah, first major conflict during the invasion of Iraq.
- 2008 – Official opening of Rajiv Gandhi International Airport in Hyderabad, India.
- 2009 – FedEx Express Flight 80: A McDonnell Douglas MD-11 flying from Guangzhou, China crashes at Tokyo's Narita International Airport, killing both the captain and the co-pilot.
- 2010 – The Affordable Care Act becomes law in the United States.
- 2014 – The World Health Organization (WHO) reports cases of Ebola in the forested rural region of southeastern Guinea, marking the beginning of the largest Ebola outbreak in history.
- 2018 – President of Peru Pedro Pablo Kuczynski resigns from the presidency amid a mass corruption scandal before certain impeachment by the opposition-majority Congress of Peru.
- 2019 – The Kazakh capital of Astana is renamed to Nur-Sultan.
- 2019 – The US-backed Syrian Democratic Forces capture the town of Baghuz in Eastern Syria, declaring military victory over the Islamic State of Iraq and the Levant after four years of fighting, although the group maintains a scattered presence and sleeper cells across Syria and Iraq.
- 2020 – Prime Minister Boris Johnson puts the United Kingdom into its first national lockdown in response to COVID-19.
- 2021 – A container ship runs aground and obstructs the Suez Canal for six days.
- 2025 – Israel Defense Forces kill 15 aid workers in the Rafah paramedic massacre.
- 2026 – An Aerospace Force Lockheed C-130 crashes during take-off in Puerto Leguízamo, Colombia, killing 69 people.

== Births ==
=== Pre-1600 ===
- 1338 – Emperor Go-Kōgon of Japan (died 1374)
- 1430 – Margaret of Anjou, Queen Consort of England and disputed Queen Consort of France (died 1482)
- 1514 – Lorenzino de' Medici, Italian writer and assassin (died 1548)
- 1599 – Thomas Selle, German composer (died 1663)

=== 1601–1900 ===
- 1614 – Jahanara Begum, Mughal princess (died 1681)
- 1643 – Mary of Jesus de León y Delgado, Spanish Dominican lay sister and mystic (died 1731)
- 1732 – Princess Marie Adélaïde of France (died 1800)
- 1749 – Pierre-Simon Laplace, French mathematician and astronomer (died 1827)
- 1750 – Johannes Matthias Sperger, Austrian bassist and composer (died 1812)
- 1754 – Jurij Vega, Slovene mathematician, physicist and artillery officer (died 1802)
- 1769 – Augustin Daniel Belliard, French general and diplomat (died 1832)
- 1769 – William Smith, English geologist and cartographer (died 1839)
- 1823 – Schuyler Colfax, American journalist and politician, 17th Vice President of the United States (died 1885)
- 1826 – Ludwig Minkus, Austrian violinist and composer (died 1917)
- 1834 – Julius Reubke, German pianist and composer (died 1858)
- 1838 – Marie Adam-Doerrer, Swiss women's rights activist and unionist (died 1908)
- 1842 – Friedrich Amelung, Estonian-German historian, businessman and composer (died 1909)
- 1842 – Susan Jane Cunningham, American mathematician (died 1921)
- 1858 – Ludwig Quidde, German activist and politician, Nobel Prize laureate (died 1941)
- 1860 – Horatio Bottomley, British politician and businessman (died 1933)
- 1862 – Nathaniel Reed, American criminal (died 1950)
- 1868 – Dietrich Eckart, German journalist and politician (died 1923)
- 1869 – Calouste Gulbenkian, Turkish-Armenian businessman and philanthropist (died 1955)
- 1872 – Michael Joseph Savage, Australian-New Zealand union leader and politician, 23rd Prime Minister of New Zealand (died 1940)
- 1874 – Grantley Goulding, English hurdler (died 1947)
- 1874 – J. C. Leyendecker, German-American painter and illustrator (died 1951)
- 1876 – Ziya Gökalp, Turkish sociologist, poet and activist (died 1924)
- 1876 – Thakin Kodaw Hmaing, Burmese poet, writer and political leader (died 1964)
- 1878 – Franz Schreker, Austrian composer and conductor (died 1934)
- 1880 – Heikki Ritavuori, Finnish lawyer and politician, Finnish Minister of the Interior (died 1922)
- 1881 – Lacey Hearn, American sprinter (died 1969)
- 1881 – Roger Martin du Gard, French novelist and paleographer, Nobel Prize laureate (died 1958)
- 1881 – Hermann Staudinger, German chemist and academic, Nobel Prize laureate (died 1965)
- 1882 – Emmy Noether, Jewish German-American mathematician, physicist and academic (died 1935)
- 1884 – Joseph Boxhall, English sailor, officer aboard the Titanic (died 1967)
- 1885 – Platt Adams, American jumper and politician (died 1961)
- 1885 – Roque González Garza, Mexican general and acting president (1915) (died 1962)
- 1886 – Frank Irons, American long jumper (died 1942)
- 1887 – Josef Čapek, Czech painter and poet (died 1945)
- 1887 – Rudolf Kinau, German author (died 1975)
- 1887 – Juan Gris, Spanish painter and sculptor (died 1927)
- 1887 – Sidney Hillman, Lithuanian-born American labor leader (died 1946)
- 1891 – Po Kya, Burmese author and educationist (died 1942)
- 1893 – Cedric Gibbons, Irish-American art director and production designer (died 1960)
- 1893 – Gopalswamy Doraiswamy Naidu, Indian engineer and businessman (died 1974)
- 1894 – Arthur Grimsdell, English international footballer and cricketer (died 1963)
- 1895 – Encarnacion Alzona, Filipino historian and educator (died 2001)
- 1895 – Dane Rudhyar, French-American astrologer, author and composer (died 1985)
- 1898 – Louis Adamic, Slovenian-American author, translator and politician (died 1951)
- 1898 – Madeleine de Bourbon-Busset, Duchess of Parma (died 1984)
- 1899 – Dora Gerson, German actress and singer (died 1943)
- 1900 – Erich Fromm, German psychologist and sociologist (died 1980)

=== 1901–present ===
- 1901 – Bhakti Hridaya Bon, Indian guru and religious writer (died 1982)
- 1903 – Frank Sargeson, New Zealand writer (died 1982)
- 1905 – Lale Andersen, German chanson singer-songwriter (died 1972)
- 1907 – Daniel Bovet, Swiss-Italian pharmacologist and academic, Nobel Prize laureate (died 1992)
- 1909 – Charles Werner, American cartoonist (died 1997)
- 1910 – Jerry Cornes, English runner, colonial officer and educator (died 2001)
- 1910 – Akira Kurosawa, Japanese director, producer and screenwriter (died 1998)
- 1912 – Eleanor Cameron, Canadian-American children's author and critic (died 1996)
- 1912 – Neil McCorkell, English-South African cricketer and coach (died 2013)
- 1912 – Wernher von Braun, German-American physicist and engineer, chief architect of the Saturn V launch vehicle (died 1977)
- 1913 – Abidin Dino, Turko-French painter and illustrator (died 1993)
- 1914 – Milbourne Christopher, American magician and author (died 1984)
- 1915 – Mary Innes-Ker, Duchess of Roxburghe (died 2014)
- 1915 – Vasily Zaytsev, Russian captain (died 1991)
- 1917 – Harry Cranbrook Allen, English historian (died 1998)
- 1918 – Stanley Armour Dunham, American sergeant (died 1992)
- 1918 – Helene Hale, American politician (died 2013)
- 1918 – Naoki Kazu, Japanese football player (died 1940s)
- 1919 – Carl Graffunder, American architect and educator (died 2013)
- 1919 – Subhadra Joshi, Indian freedom activist and politician (died 2003)
- 1920 – Tetsuharu Kawakami, Japanese baseball player and manager (died 2013)
- 1920 – Neal Edward Smith, American pilot, lawyer and politician (died 2021)
- 1921 – Donald Campbell, English race car driver (died 1967)
- 1921 – Peter Lawler, Australian public servant (died 2017)
- 1922 – Marty Allen, American comedian and actor (died 2018)
- 1922 – Ugo Tognazzi, Italian actor (died 1990)
- 1923 – Angelo Ingrassia, American soldier and judge (died 2013)
- 1924 – Rodney Mims Cook, Sr., American lieutenant and politician (died 2013)
- 1924 – Olga Kennard, English crystallographer and academic (died 2023)
- 1924 – John Madin, English architect (died 2012)
- 1924 – Bette Nesmith Graham, American inventor of Liquid Paper (died 1980)
- 1925 – David Watkin, English cinematographer (died 2008)
- 1928 – Lee Sexton, American banjo player (died 2021)
- 1929 – Roger Bannister, English middle-distance runner, neurologist and academic (died 2018)
- 1929 – Michael Manser, English architect and engineer (died 2016)
- 1929 – Mark Rydell, American actor, director and producer (died 2026)
- 1931 – Yevgeny Grishin, Russian speed skater (died 2005)
- 1931 – Viktor Korchnoi, Russian chess player and author (died 2016)
- 1931 – Yevdokiya Mekshilo, Russian skier (died 2013)
- 1932 – Don Marshall, Canadian ice hockey player (died 2024)
- 1933 – Norman Bailey, English opera singer and educator (died 2021)
- 1933 – Philip Zimbardo, American psychologist and academic (died 2024)
- 1934 – Alan Baddeley, English psychologist
- 1934 – Ludvig Faddeev, Russian mathematician and physicist (died 2017)
- 1935 – Barry Cryer, English comedian, actor and screenwriter (died 2022)
- 1936 – Jannis Kounellis, Greek painter and sculptor (died 2017)
- 1937 – Craig Breedlove, American race car driver (died 2023)
- 1937 – Tony Burton, American actor, comedian, boxer and football player (died 2016)
- 1937 – Robert Gallo, American physician and academic
- 1938 – Jon Finlayson, Australian actor and screenwriter (died 2012)
- 1942 – Michael Haneke, Austrian director, producer and screenwriter
- 1942 – Jimmy Miller, American record producer and musician (died 1994)
- 1942 – Walter Rodney, Guyanese historian, scholar and activist (died 1980)
- 1943 – Andrew Crockett, Scottish-English economist and banker (died 2012)
- 1943 – Nils-Aslak Valkeapää, Finnish singer, author and director (died 2001)
- 1944 – Tony McPhee, English singer-songwriter and guitarist (died 2023)
- 1944 – Michael Nyman, English composer of minimalist music and pianist
- 1944 – Ric Ocasek, American singer-songwriter, guitarist and producer (died 2019)
- 1945 – Franco Battiato, Italian singer-songwriter and director (died 2021)
- 1945 – David Grisman, American mandolin player and composer
- 1946 – Alan Bleasdale, English screenwriter and producer
- 1947 – Elizabeth Ann Scarborough, American author
- 1948 – Wasim Bari, Pakistani cricketer
- 1948 – Marie Malavoy, German-Canadian educator and politician
- 1950 – Corinne Cléry, French actress
- 1950 – Phil Lanzon, English keyboard player and songwriter
- 1950 – Ahdaf Soueif, Egyptian author and translator
- 1951 – Ron Jaworski, American football player and sportscaster
- 1951 – Adrian Reynard, English businessman, founded Reynard Motorsport
- 1952 – Francesco Clemente, Italian painter and illustrator
- 1952 – Kim Stanley Robinson, American author
- 1952 – Rex Tillerson, American businessman, engineer and diplomat; 69th United States Secretary of State
- 1953 – Bo Díaz, Venezuelan baseball player (died 1990)
- 1953 – Chaka Khan, American singer-songwriter
- 1953 – Kiran Mazumdar-Shaw, Indian zoologist and businesswoman
- 1954 – Geno Auriemma, Italian-American basketball player and coach
- 1954 – Kenneth Cole, American fashion designer, founded Kenneth Cole Productions
- 1954 – Mary Fee, Scottish Labour Party politician
- 1954 – Paul Price, English-Welsh footballer and manager
- 1955 – Moses Malone, American basketball player (died 2015)
- 1956 – José Manuel Barroso, Portuguese academic and politician, 115th Prime Minister of Portugal
- 1957 – Lucio Gutiérrez, Ecuadorian politician, 52nd President of Ecuador
- 1957 – Robbie James, Welsh footballer and manager (died 1998)
- 1957 – Amanda Plummer, American actress
- 1958 – Etienne De Wilde, Belgian cyclist
- 1958 – Hugh Grant, Scottish business executive
- 1958 – Bengt-Åke Gustafsson, Swedish ice hockey player and coach
- 1959 – Catherine Keener, American actress
- 1960 – Haris Romas, Greek actor, screenwriter, and lyricist
- 1960 – Nicol Stephen, Baron Stephen, Scottish lawyer and politician, 2nd Deputy First Minister of Scotland
- 1961 – Roger Crisp, English philosopher and academic
- 1961 – Craig Green, New Zealand rugby player
- 1961 – Helmi Johannes, Indonesian journalist and producer
- 1962 – Steve Redgrave, English rower
- 1963 – Juan Ramón López Caro, Spanish footballer and manager
- 1963 – Míchel, Spanish footballer and manager
- 1963 – Ana Fidelia Quirot, Cuban runner
- 1964 – Hope Davis, American actress
- 1965 – Richard Grieco, American actor, artist, and model
- 1965 – Gary Whitehead, American poet and painter
- 1966 – Lorenzo Daniel, American sprinter
- 1966 – Marin Hinkle, American actress
- 1966 – Vasilis Vouzas, Greek footballer and manager
- 1968 – Damon Albarn, English singer-songwriter, producer and actor
- 1968 – Mike Atherton, English cricketer and journalist
- 1968 – Fernando Hierro, Spanish footballer and manager
- 1968 – Pierre Palmade, French actor and screenwriter
- 1970 – Gianni Infantino, Swiss-Italian football administrator, president of FIFA
- 1971 – Yasmeen Ghauri, Canadian model
- 1971 – Gail Porter, Scottish model and television host
- 1971 – Alexander Selivanov, Russian ice hockey player
- 1971 – Hiroyoshi Tenzan, Japanese wrestler
- 1972 – Jonas Björkman, Swedish-Monégasque tennis player and coach
- 1972 – Joe Calzaghe, Welsh boxer
- 1972 – Judith Godrèche, French actress and author
- 1973 – Jerzy Dudek, Polish footballer
- 1973 – Wim Eyckmans, Belgian race car driver
- 1973 – Jason Kidd, American basketball player and coach
- 1973 – Bojana Radulović, Serbian-Hungarian handball player
- 1974 – Mark Hunt, New Zealand mixed martial artist
- 1974 – Randall Park, American actor, director and screenwriter
- 1975 – Burak Gürpınar, Turkish drummer
- 1975 – Andy Turner, English footballer and manager
- 1976 – Chris Hoy, Scottish cyclist
- 1976 – Smriti Irani, Indian actress, producer and politician, Indian Minister of Human Resource Development
- 1976 – Dougie Lampkin, English motorcycle racer
- 1976 – Michelle Monaghan, American actress
- 1976 – Joel Peralta, Dominican baseball player
- 1976 – Keri Russell, American actress
- 1976 – Benny Sa, Chinese television host
- 1976 – Ricardo Zonta, Brazilian race car driver
- 1977 – Miklos Perlus, Canadian actor and screenwriter
- 1978 – Simon Gärdenfors, Swedish illustrator
- 1978 – Perez Hilton, American blogger
- 1978 – Walter Samuel, Argentine footballer
- 1978 – Nicholle Tom, American actress
- 1978 – Liu Ye, Chinese actor
- 1979 – Mark Buehrle, American baseball player
- 1979 – Donncha O'Callaghan, Irish rugby player
- 1981 – Pavel Brendl, Czech ice hockey player
- 1981 – Erin Crocker, American race car driver
- 1981 – Tony Peña Jr., Dominican baseball player
- 1981 – Shelley Rudman, English bobsledder
- 1981 – Giuseppe Sculli, Italian footballer
- 1981 – Brett Young, American singer-songwriter
- 1982 – José Contreras Arrau, Chilean footballer
- 1982 – Andrea Musacco, Italian footballer
- 1982 – Evgeni Striganov, Estonian ice dancer
- 1983 – Hakan Balta, Turkish footballer
- 1983 – Mo Farah, Somali-English runner
- 1983 – Sascha Riether, German footballer
- 1983 – Jerome Thomas, English footballer
- 1984 – Ryan Araña, Filipino basketball player
- 1984 – Brandon Marshall, American football player
- 1985 – Maurice Jones-Drew, American football player
- 1985 – Bethanie Mattek-Sands, American tennis player
- 1986 – Patrick Bordeleau, Canadian ice hockey player
- 1986 – Andrea Dovizioso, Italian motorcycle racer
- 1986 – Brett Eldredge, American singer-songwriter and musician
- 1986 – Kangana Ranaut, Indian actress
- 1987 – Alan Toovey, Australian footballer
- 1988 – Dellin Betances, American baseball player
- 1988 – Jason Kenny, English cyclist
- 1988 – Michal Neuvirth, Czech ice hockey player
- 1989 – Ayesha Curry, Canadian-American chef, author and television personality
- 1989 – Nikola Gulan, Serbian footballer
- 1989 – Luis Fernando Silva, Mexican footballer
- 1990 – Jaime Alguersuari, Spanish race car driver
- 1990 – Mark Barberio, Canadian ice hockey player
- 1990 – Princess Eugenie, English royal
- 1990 – Gordon Hayward, American basketball player
- 1990 – Robert Zickert, German footballer
- 1991 – Facundo Campazzo, Argentine basketball player
- 1991 – Erik Haula, Finnish ice hockey player
- 1991 – Gregg Wylde, Scottish footballer
- 1992 – Tolga Ciğerci, German-Turkish footballer
- 1992 – Kyrie Irving, Australian-American basketball player
- 1992 – Vanessa Morgan, Canadian actress
- 1993 – Quinn Cook, American basketball player
- 1993 – Tomáš Hyka, Czech ice hockey player
- 1993 – Dmitrij Jaškin, Russian-Czech ice hockey player
- 1993 – Aytaç Kara, Turkish footballer
- 1994 – Nick Powell, English footballer
- 1994 – Oskar Sundqvist, Swedish ice hockey player
- 1994 – Bridger Zadina, American actor
- 1995 – Kevin Kauber, Estonian footballer
- 1995 – Jan Lisiecki, Canadian pianist
- 1995 – Victoria Pedretti, American actress
- 1995 – Ozan Tufan, Turkish footballer
- 1996 – Alexander Albon, Thai-British race car driver
- 1996 – Joel Kiviranta, Finnish ice hockey player
- 1997 – Ben Manenti, Australian cricketer
- 2001 – Anna Hall, American world champion heptathlete

== Deaths ==
=== Pre-1600 ===
- 59 – Agrippina the Younger, Roman empress (born 15)
- 851 – Zhou Chi, Chinese historian and politician (born 793)
- 1022 – Zhen Zong, Chinese emperor (born 968)
- 1103 – Eudes I, duke of Burgundy (born 1058)
- 1361 – Henry of Grosmont, 1st Duke of Lancaster, English politician, Lord High Steward of England (born 1310)
- 1369 – Peter, king of Castile and León (born 1334)
- 1483 – Yolande, duchess of Lorraine (born 1428)
- 1548 – Itagaki Nobukata, Japanese samurai (born 1489)
- 1555 – Julius III, pope of the Catholic Church (born 1487)
- 1559 – Gelawdewos, Ethiopian emperor (born 1521)
- 1596 – Henry Unton, English diplomat (born 1557)

=== 1601–1900 ===
- 1606 – Justus Lipsius, Flemish philologist and scholar (born 1547)
- 1618 – James Hamilton, 1st Earl of Abercorn, Scottish police officer and politician (born 1575)
- 1629 – Francis Fane, 1st Earl of Westmorland, English landowner and politician (born 1580)
- 1675 – Anthoni van Noordt, Dutch organist and composer (born 1619)
- 1680 – Nicolas Fouquet, French politician (born 1615)
- 1712 – Zebi Hirsch Kaidanover, Lithuanian-born rabbi and writer (born c. 1650)
- 1742 – Jean-Baptiste Dubos, French historian and author (born 1670)
- 1747 – Claude Alexandre de Bonneval, French general (born 1675)
- 1748 – Johann Gottfried Walther, German organist and composer (born 1684)
- 1754 – Johann Jakob Wettstein, Swiss theologian and critic (born 1693)
- 1783 – Charles Carroll, English barrister and politician (born 1723)
- 1792 – Luís António Verney, Portuguese philosopher and pedagogue (born 1713)
- 1801 – Paul I, Russian emperor (born 1754)
- 1842 – Stendhal, French novelist (born 1783)
- 1862 – Manuel Robles Pezuela, Unconstitutional Mexican interim president, 1858–1859 (born 1817)
- 1883 – Arthur Macalister, Scottish-Australian politician, 2nd Premier of Queensland (born 1818)
- 1884 – Henry C. Lord, American businessman (born 1824)

=== 1901–present ===
- 1910 – Nadar, French photographer, journalist, and author (born 1820)
- 1914 – Rafqa Pietra Choboq Ar-Rayès, Lebanese saint (born 1832)
- 1923 – Hovhannes Tumanyan, Armenian poet and author (born 1869)
- 1927 – Paul César Helleu, French painter and etcher (born 1859)
- 1931 – Shivaram Rajguru, Indian activist (born 1908)
- 1931 – Bhagat Singh, Indian activist (born 1907)
- 1931 – Sukhdev Thapar, Indian activist (born 1907)
- 1946 – Gilbert N. Lewis, American chemist (born 1875)
- 1953 – Raoul Dufy, French painter and illustrator (born 1877)
- 1953 – Oskar Luts, Estonian author and playwright (born 1887)
- 1955 – Artur Bernardes, Brazilian politician, 12th President of Brazil (born 1875)
- 1960 – Franklin Pierce Adams, American journalist and author (born 1881)
- 1960 – Said Nursî, Turkish theologian and scholar (born 1878)
- 1961 – Albert Bloch, American painter and educator (born 1882)
- 1961 – Jack Russell, English cricketer (born 1887)
- 1963 – Thoralf Skolem, Norwegian mathematician and logician (born 1887)
- 1964 – Peter Lorre, American actor (born 1904)
- 1965 – Mae Murray, American actress, dancer, producer, and screenwriter (born 1885)
- 1967 – Lalla Carlsen, Norwegian singer and actress (born 1889)
- 1968 – Edwin O'Connor, American journalist and author (born 1918)
- 1972 – Cristóbal Balenciaga, Spanish fashion designer, founded Balenciaga (born 1895)
- 1978 – Haim Ernst Wertheimer, Israeli biochemist and academic (born 1893)
- 1978 – Halyna Kuzmenko, Ukrainian teacher and anarchist revolutionary (born 1897)
- 1979 – Ted Anderson, English footballer (born 1911)
- 1980 – Arthur Melvin Okun, American economist and academic (born 1928)
- 1981 – Beatrice Tinsley, English-New Zealand astronomer and cosmologist (born 1941)
- 1981 – Mike Hailwood, English motorcyclist (born 1940)
- 1985 – Richard Beeching, Baron Beeching, English physicist and engineer (born 1913)
- 1985 – Peter Charanis, Greek-American scholar and educator (born 1908)
- 1986 – Moshe Feinstein, American Orthodox Rabbi and posek (born 1895)
- 1987 – Olev Roomet, Estonian singer and violinist (born 1901)
- 1990 – John Dexter, English director and producer (born 1925)
- 1991 – Margaret Atwood Judson, American historian and author (born 1899)
- 1991 – Parkash Singh, Indian soldier, Victoria Cross recipient (born 1913)
- 1992 – Friedrich Hayek, Austrian-German economist, philosopher, and academic, Nobel Prize laureate (born 1899)
- 1992 – Ron Lapointe, Canadian ice hockey player and coach (born 1949)
- 1994 – Luis Donaldo Colosio, Mexican economist and politician (born 1950)
- 1994 – Giulietta Masina, Italian actress (born 1921)
- 1995 – Davie Cooper, Scottish footballer and coach (born 1956)
- 1999 – Luis María Argaña, Paraguayan judge and politician, Vice President of Paraguay (born 1932)
- 1999 – Osmond Borradaile, Canadian director and cinematographer (born 1898)
- 2001 – Rowland Evans, American journalist (born 1921)
- 2001 – Margaret Jones, British archaeologist (born 1916)
- 2001 – Robert Laxalt, American author (born 1923)
- 2001 – David McTaggart, Canadian badminton player and environmentalist (born 1932)
- 2002 – Eileen Farrell, American soprano (born 1920)
- 2002 – Ben Hollioake, Australian-English cricketer (born 1977)
- 2003 – Fritz Spiegl, Austrian-English flute player and journalist (born 1926)
- 2004 – Rupert Hamer, Australian soldier, lawyer, and politician, 39th Premier of Victoria (born 1916)
- 2006 – David B. Bleak, American sergeant, Medal of Honor recipient (born 1932)
- 2006 – Desmond Doss, American soldier, Medal of Honor recipient (born 1919)
- 2006 – Cindy Walker, American singer-songwriter and dancer (born 1918)
- 2007 – Paul Cohen, American mathematician and theorist (born 1934)
- 2007 – Eric Medlen, American race car driver (born 1973)
- 2008 – Vaino Vahing, Estonian psychiatrist, author, and playwright (born 1940)
- 2009 – Ghukas Chubaryan, Armenian sculptor (born 1923)
- 2009 – Raúl Macías, Mexican boxer and trainer (born 1934)
- 2011 – Jean Bartik, American computer scientist and engineer (born 1924)
- 2011 – Rosario Morales, Puerto Rican poet and writer (born 1930)
- 2011 – Elizabeth Taylor, American-British actress, socialite and humanitarian (born 1932)
- 2012 – Abdullahi Yusuf Ahmed, Somalian politician, President of Somalia (born 1934)
- 2012 – Jim Duffy, American animator, director, and producer (born 1937)
- 2012 – Naji Talib, Iraqi politician, 52nd Prime Minister of Iraq (born 1917)
- 2012 – Lonnie Wright, American basketball and football player (born 1945)
- 2013 – Boris Berezovsky, Russian-born Soviet-British mathematician and businessman (born 1946)
- 2013 – Onofre Corpuz, Filipino economist, historian, and academic (born 1926)
- 2013 – Virgil Trucks, American baseball player and coach (born 1917)
- 2013 – Joe Weider, Canadian-American bodybuilder and publisher, co-founded the International Federation of BodyBuilding & Fitness (born 1919)
- 2014 – Dave Brockie, Canadian-American singer-songwriter and bass player (born 1963)
- 2014 – Jaroslav Šerých, Czech painter and illustrator (born 1928)
- 2014 – Adolfo Suárez, Spanish lawyer and politician, 1st Prime Minister of Spain (born 1932)
- 2014 – Peter Oakley, English YouTuber (born 1927)
- 2015 – Gian Vittorio Baldi, Italian director, producer, and screenwriter (born 1930)
- 2015 – Lee Kuan Yew, Singaporean lawyer and politician, 1st Prime Minister of Singapore (born 1923)
- 2015 – Bobby Lowther, American basketball player and lieutenant (born 1923)
- 2015 – Lil' Chris, English singer-songwriter, actor, and television personality (born 1990)
- 2016 – Joe Garagiola, American baseball player and sportscaster (born 1926)
- 2016 – Ken Howard, American actor (born 1944)
- 2017 – Miroslava Breach, Mexican investigative journalist (born 1962)
- 2021 – George Segal, American actor (born 1934)
- 2021 – Julie Pomagalski, French snowboarder (born 1980)
- 2022 – Madeleine Albright, Czechoslovak-American diplomat, 64th United States Secretary of State (born 1937)
- 2025 – Mia Love, American politician (born 1975)
- 2026 – Valerie Perrine, American actress (born 1943)
- 2026 – Chip Taylor, American singer and songwriter (born 1940)

== Holidays and observances ==
- Christian feast day:
  - Gregory the Illuminator (Episcopal Church)
  - Gwinear
  - Joseph Oriol
  - Ottone Frangipane
  - Rafqa Pietra Choboq Ar-Rayès (Maronite Church)
  - Turibius of Mogrovejo
  - Victorian, Frumentius and Companions
  - March 23 (Eastern Orthodox liturgics)
- Day of Hungarian-Polish Friendship (Hungary and Poland)
- Day of the Sea (Bolivia)
- Ministry of Environment and Natural Resources Day (Azerbaijan)
- Pakistan Day (Pakistan)
- Promised Messiah Day (Ahmadiyya)
- World Meteorological Day
