= July 29 =

July 29 this year in various calendars
- Wednesday, 29 July 2026
Akan	Nwonawukuo
Armenian	9 Nawasardi 1476
Aztec	Quecholli 20, 6 Tōchtli
Babylonian	14 Du'uzu, 2337 SE
Balinese pawukon	Menga, Beteng, Laba, Paing, Aryang, Buda of Krulut, Indra, Ogan, Manusa
Bengali	14 Shrabon, BS 1433
Chinese	Yang Wood Dragon・Winnowing Basket Mansion; Fire Horse Year, Month 6, Day 16 (Dashu, 9 days until Liqiu)
Common Era	29 July 2026 CE
Coptic	22 Epip, AM 1742
Egyptian	14 Choiak, 2775 NE
Ethiopian	22 Ḥamlē, 2018 Amätä Məhrät
French Republican	Décade II, Primidi de Thermidor de l'Année 234 de la République
Gregorian	29 July, AD 2026
Hebrew	15 Av, AM 5786
Hindu	Uttarāṣāḍha・Viṣkambha; Solar: 13 Śrāvaṇa, 1948 SE; Lunisolar: Pūrṇimā, Śukla pakṣa of Āṣāḍha, 2083 VE; Rāudra・5127 KY・1,872,785
Icelandic	Miðvikudagur, 4 Heyannir 2026
Islamic	13 Safar, AH 1448 (using tabular method)
ISO week date	2026-W31-3
Japanese	16 Minazuki, Reiwa 8 (Taisho, 9 days until Risshū)
Julian	16 July, AD 2026 (AM 7534)
Julian day	2461251
Korean	16 Yangdal, 4359 DE
Maya	13.0.13.14.8; 1 Yaxkin, 6 Lamat
Roman	ante diem XVII Kalendas Augustas, MMDCCLXXIX AUC
Solar Hijri	7 Mordad, SH 1405
Tibetan	15 chu stod, me pho rta 2153 or 1772 or 1000

<<	July					>>
Su	Mo	Tu	We	Th	Fr	Sa
			1	2	3	4
5	6	7	8	9	10	11
12	13	14	15	16	17	18
19	20	21	22	23	24	25
26	27	28	29	30	31
2026

July 29 in recent years
2026 (Wednesday)
2025 (Tuesday)
2024 (Monday)
2023 (Saturday)
2022 (Friday)
2021 (Thursday)
2020 (Wednesday)
2019 (Monday)
2018 (Sunday)
2017 (Saturday)

July 29 is the 210th day of the year (211th in leap years) in the Gregorian calendar; 155 days remain until the end of the year.

== Events ==
=== Pre-1600 ===
- 587 BC – The Neo-Babylonian Empire sacks Jerusalem and destroys the First Temple.
- 238 AD – The Praetorian guard revolts against emperors Balbinus and Pupienus and arrests them.
- 615 – Pakal ascends the throne of Palenque at the age of 12.
- 904 – Sack of Thessalonica: Saracen raiders under Leo of Tripoli sack Thessaloniki, the Byzantine Empire's second-largest city, after a short siege, and plunder it for a week.
- 923 – Battle of Firenzuola: Lombard forces under King Rudolph II and Adalbert I, margrave of Ivrea, defeat the dethroned Emperor Berengar I of Italy at Firenzuola (Tuscany).
- 1014 – Byzantine–Bulgarian wars: Battle of Kleidion: Byzantine emperor Basil II inflicts a decisive defeat on the Bulgarian army, and his subsequent treatment of 15,000 prisoners reportedly causes Tsar Samuil of Bulgaria to die of a heart attack less than three months later, on October 6.
- 1018 – Count Dirk III defeats an army sent by Emperor Henry II in the Battle of Vlaardingen.
- 1030 – Ladejarl-Fairhair succession wars: Battle of Stiklestad: King Olaf II fights and dies trying to regain his Norwegian throne from the Danes.
- 1148 – The Siege of Damascus ends in a decisive crusader defeat and leads to the disintegration of the Second Crusade.
- 1565 – The widowed Mary, Queen of Scots marries Henry Stuart, Lord Darnley, Duke of Albany, at Holyrood Palace, Edinburgh, Scotland, in a Catholic ceremony.
- 1567 – The infant James VI is crowned King of Scotland at Stirling.
- 1588 – Anglo-Spanish War: Battle of Gravelines: English naval forces under the command of Lord Charles Howard and Sir Francis Drake defeat the Spanish Armada off the coast of Gravelines, France.

=== 1601–1900 ===
- 1602 – Elizabeth I visits Harefield Place at Hillingdon and the Harefield Entertainment is performed.
- 1693 – War of the Grand Alliance: Battle of Landen: France wins a victory over Allied forces in the Netherlands.
- 1775 – Founding of the U.S. Army Judge Advocate General's Corps: General George Washington appoints William Tudor as Judge Advocate of the Continental Army.
- 1818 – French physicist Augustin Fresnel submits his prizewinning "Memoir on the Diffraction of Light", precisely accounting for the limited extent to which light spreads into shadows, and thereby demolishing the oldest objection to the wave theory of light.
- 1832 – An Egyptian army under Ibrahim Pascha defeats a larger Ottoman army in the battle of Belen Pass.
- 1836 – Inauguration of the Arc de Triomphe in Paris, France.
- 1848 – Great Famine of Ireland: Tipperary Revolt: In County Tipperary, Ireland, then in the United Kingdom, an unsuccessful nationalist revolt against British rule is put down by police.
- 1851 – Annibale de Gasparis discovers asteroid 15 Eunomia.
- 1858 – United States and Japan sign the Harris Treaty.
- 1862 – American Civil War: Confederate spy Belle Boyd is arrested by Union troops and detained at the Old Capitol Prison in Washington, D.C.
- 1871 – The Connecticut Valley Railroad opens between Old Saybrook, Connecticut and Hartford, Connecticut in the United States.
- 1899 – The First Hague Convention is signed.
- 1900 – In Italy, King Umberto I of Italy is assassinated by the anarchist Gaetano Bresci. His son, Victor Emmanuel III, 31 years old, succeeds to the throne.

=== 1901–present ===
- 1901 – Land lottery begins in Oklahoma.
- 1907 – Sir Robert Baden-Powell sets up the Brownsea Island Scout camp in Poole Harbour on the south coast of England. The camp runs from August 1 to August 9 and is regarded as the foundation of the Scouting movement.
- 1910 – The two-day Slocum massacre commences in Texas, a race riot in which more than 100 African Americans are murdered.
- 1914 – The Cape Cod Canal opened.
- 1920 – Construction of the Link River Dam begins as part of the Klamath Reclamation Project.
- 1921 – Adolf Hitler becomes leader of the National Socialist German Workers' Party.
- 1932 – Great Depression: In Washington, D.C., troops disperse the last of the "Bonus Army" of World War I veterans using arson, bayonets, sabers, tanks, tear gas, and vomit gas.
- 1937 – Tongzhou mutiny: In Tongzhou, China, the East Hebei Army attacks Japanese troops and civilians.
- 1945 – The BBC Light Programme radio station is launched for mainstream light entertainment and music.
- 1947—A gas explosion in Harrisonburg, Virginia kills 11 and injures 30.
- 1948 – Olympic Games: The Games of the XIV Olympiad: After a hiatus of 12 years caused by World War II, the first Summer Olympics to be held since the 1936 Summer Olympics in Berlin, open in London.
- 1950 – Korean War: After four days, the No Gun Ri Massacre ends when the US Army 7th Cavalry Regiment is withdrawn.
- 1957 – The International Atomic Energy Agency is established.
- 1957 – Tonight Starring Jack Paar premieres on NBC with Jack Paar beginning the modern day talk show.
- 1958 – U.S. President Dwight D. Eisenhower signs into law the National Aeronautics and Space Act, which creates the National Aeronautics and Space Administration (NASA).
- 1965 – Vietnam War: The first 4,000 101st Airborne Division paratroopers arrive in Vietnam, landing at Cam Ranh Bay.
- 1967 – Vietnam War: Off the coast of North Vietnam the USS Forrestal catches on fire in the worst U.S. naval disaster since World War II, killing 134.
- 1967 – During the fourth day of celebrating its 400th anniversary, the city of Caracas, Venezuela is shaken by an earthquake, leaving approximately 500 dead.
- 1972 – Two Avianca Douglas DC-3 airliners collide over Colombia, killing 38.
- 1973 – Greeks vote to abolish the monarchy, beginning the first period of the Metapolitefsi.
- 1973 – Driver Roger Williamson is killed during the Dutch Grand Prix, after a suspected tire failure causes his car to pitch into the barriers at high speed.
- 1976 – In New York City, David Berkowitz (a.k.a. the "Son of Sam") kills one person and seriously wounds another in the first of a series of attacks.
- 1980 – Iran adopts a new "holy" flag after the Islamic Revolution.
- 1981 – A worldwide television audience of around 750 million people watch the wedding of Charles, Prince of Wales, and Lady Diana Spencer at St Paul's Cathedral in London.
- 1981 – After impeachment on June 21, Abolhassan Banisadr flees with Massoud Rajavi to Paris, in an Iranian Air Force Boeing 707, piloted by Colonel Behzad Moezzi, to form the National Council of Resistance of Iran.
- 1985 – Space Shuttle Challenger launches on STS-51-F. The shuttle ends up in a lower orbit than planned due to an engine failure during ascent.
- 1987 – British Prime Minister Margaret Thatcher and President of France François Mitterrand sign the agreement to build a tunnel under the English Channel (Channel Tunnel).
- 1987 – Prime Minister of India Rajiv Gandhi and President of Sri Lanka J. R. Jayewardene sign the Indo-Sri Lanka Accord on ethnic issues.
- 1993 – The Supreme Court of Israel acquits alleged Nazi death camp guard John Demjanjuk of all charges and he is set free.
- 1996 – The child protection portion of the Communications Decency Act is struck down by a U.S. federal court as too broad.
- 2005 – Astronomers announce their discovery of the dwarf planet Eris.
- 2010 – An overloaded passenger ferry capsizes on the Kasai River in Bandundu Province, Democratic Republic of the Congo, resulting in at least 80 deaths.
- 2013 – Two passenger trains collide in the Swiss municipality of Granges-près-Marnand near Lausanne injuring 25 people.
- 2015 – The first piece of suspected debris from Malaysia Airlines Flight 370 is discovered on Réunion Island.
- 2019 – The 2019 Altamira prison riot between rival Brazilian drug gangs leaves 62 dead.
- 2021 – The International Space Station temporarily spins out of control, moving the ISS 45 degrees out of attitude, following an engine malfunction of Russian module Nauka.
- 2024 – Three children are stabbed to death and 10 other people injured at a dance studio in Southport, England. This incident, coupled with widespread online misinformation, leads to various racially motivated riots across the UK.

== Births ==
=== Pre-1600 ===
- 869 – Muhammad al-Mahdi, The 12th Imam of Muslims (Shiites) (died 941)
- 996 – Fujiwara no Norimichi, Japanese nobleman (died 1075)
- 1166 – Henry II, French nobleman and king of Jerusalem (died 1197)
- 1356 – Martin the Elder, king of Aragon, Valencia and Majorca (died 1410)
- 1537 – Pedro Téllez-Girón, Spanish nobleman (died 1590)
- 1573 – Philip II, duke of Pomerania-Stettin (died 1618)
- 1580 – Francesco Mochi, Italian sculptor (died 1654)

=== 1601–1900 ===
- 1605 – Simon Dach, German poet and hymn-writer (died 1659)
- 1646 – Johann Theile, German organist and composer (died 1724)
- 1744 – Giulio Maria della Somaglia, Italian cardinal (died 1830)
- 1763 – Philip Charles Durham, Scottish admiral and politician (died 1845)
- 1796 – Walter Hunt, inventor of the safety pin and other things (died 1859)
- 1797 – Daniel Drew, American businessman and financier (died 1879)
- 1801 – George Bradshaw, English cartographer and publisher (died 1853)
- 1805 – Alexis de Tocqueville, French historian and philosopher (died 1859)
- 1806 – Horace Abbott, American businessman and banker (died 1887)
- 1817 – Ivan Aivazovsky, Armenian-Russian painter and illustrator (died 1900)
- 1817 – Martin Körber, German pastor, composer, and conductor (died 1893)
- 1841 – Gerhard Armauer Hansen, Norwegian physician (died 1912)
- 1843 – Johannes Schmidt, German linguist and academic (died 1901)
- 1846 – Sophie Menter, German pianist and composer (died 1918)
- 1846 – Isabel, Brazilian princess (died 1921)
- 1849 – Max Nordau, Hungarian physician, author, and critic, co-founded the World Zionist Organization (died 1923)
- 1859 – Francisco Rodrigues da Cruz, Portuguese priest (died 1948)
- 1860 – Charles Cochrane-Baillie, 2nd Baron Lamington, English politician, 8th Governor of Queensland (died 1940)
- 1867 – Berthold Oppenheim, Moravian rabbi (died 1942)
- 1869 – Booth Tarkington, American novelist and dramatist (died 1946)
- 1870 – George Dixon, Canadian boxer (World Bantamweight title) (died 1930)
- 1871 – Jakob Mändmets, Estonian writer and journalist (died 1930)
- 1872 – Eric Alfred Knudsen, American author, lawyer, and politician (died 1957)
- 1874 – J. S. Woodsworth, Canadian minister and politician (died 1942)
- 1876 – Maria Ouspenskaya, Russian-American actress and acting teacher (died 1949)
- 1878 – Don Marquis, American author, poet, and playwright (died 1937)
- 1883 – Porfirio Barba-Jacob, Colombian poet and author (died 1942)
- 1883 – Benito Mussolini, Italian fascist revolutionary and politician, 27th Prime Minister of Italy (died 1945)
- 1884 – Ralph Austin Bard, American financier and politician, 2nd Under Secretary of the Navy (died 1975)
- 1885 – Theda Bara, American actress (died 1955)
- 1887 – Sigmund Romberg, Hungarian-American pianist and composer (died 1951)
- 1888 – Vladimir K. Zworykin, Russian-American inventor, engineer, invented the cathode ray tube system (died 1982)
- 1891 – Bernhard Zondek, German-Israeli gynecologist and academic (died 1966)
- 1892 – William Powell, American actor and singer (died 1984)
- 1896 – Maria L. de Hernández, Mexican-American rights activist (died 1986)
- 1897 – Neil Ritchie, Guyanese-English general (died 1983)
- 1898 – Isidor Isaac Rabi, American physicist and academic, Nobel Prize Laureate (died 1988)
- 1899 – Walter Beall, American baseball player (died 1959)
- 1900 – Mary V. Austin, Australian community worker and political activist (died 1986)
- 1900 – Eyvind Johnson, Swedish novelist and short story writer, Nobel Prize Laureate (died 1976)
- 1900 – Teresa Noce, Italian labor leader, activist, and journalist (died 1980)
- 1900 – Don Redman, American composer, and bandleader (died 1964)

=== 1901–present ===
- 1904 – Mahasi Sayadaw, Burmese monk and philosopher (died 1982)
- 1904 – J. R. D. Tata, French-Indian pilot and businessman, founded Tata Motors and Tata Global Beverages (died 1993)
- 1905 – Clara Bow, American actress (died 1965)
- 1905 – Dag Hammarskjöld, Swedish economist and diplomat, 2nd Secretary-General of the United Nations, Nobel Prize Laureate (died 1961)
- 1905 – Stanley Kunitz, American poet and translator (died 2006)
- 1906 – Thelma Todd, American actress and singer (died 1935)
- 1907 – Melvin Belli, American lawyer (died 1996)
- 1909 – Samm Sinclair Baker, American author (died 1997)
- 1909 – Chester Himes, American-Spanish author (died 1984)
- 1910 – Gale Page, American actress (died 1983)
- 1911 – Foster Furcolo, American lawyer and politician, 60th Governor of Massachusetts (died 1995)
- 1911 – Archbishop Iakovos of America (died 2005)
- 1913 – Erich Priebke, German war criminal, leader of the 1944 Ardeatine massacre (died 2013)
- 1914 – Irwin Corey, American actor and activist (died 2017)
- 1915 – Bruce R. McConkie, American colonel and religious leader (died 1985)
- 1915 – Francis W. Sargent, American soldier and politician, 64th Governor of Massachusetts (died 1998)
- 1916 – Budd Boetticher, American director, producer, and screenwriter (died 2001)
- 1916 – Charlie Christian, American guitarist (died 1942)
- 1916 – Rupert Hamer, Australian politician, 39th Premier of Victoria (died 2004)
- 1917 – Rochus Misch, German SS officer (died 2013)
- 1918 – Don Ingalls, American writer and producer (died 2014)
- 1918 – Edwin O'Connor, American journalist and author (died 1968)
- 1918 – Mary Lee Settle, American novelist, essayist, and memoirist (died 2005)
- 1920 – Neville Jeffress, Australian businessman (died 2007)
- 1921 – Richard Egan, American actor (died 1987)
- 1921 – Chris Marker, French photographer and journalist (died 2012)
- 1923 – George Burditt, American screenwriter and producer (died 2013)
- 1923 – Edgar Cortright, American scientist and engineer (died 2014)
- 1923 – Jim Marshall, English businessman, founded Marshall Amplification (died 2012)
- 1923 – Gordon Mitchell, American bodybuilder and actor (died 2003)
- 1924 – Lloyd Bochner, Canadian-American actor (died 2005)
- 1924 – Robert Horton, American actor (died 2016)
- 1925 – Harold W. Kuhn, American mathematician and academic (died 2014)
- 1925 – Ted Lindsay, Canadian ice hockey player, manager, and sportscaster (died 2019)
- 1925 – Hilary Smart, American sailor (died 2000)
- 1925 – Mikis Theodorakis, Greek composer (died 2021)
- 1926 – Robert Kilpatrick, Baron Kilpatrick of Kincraig, Scottish physician, academic, and politician (died 2015)
- 1927 – Harry Mulisch, Dutch author, poet, and playwright (died 2010)
- 1930 – Paul Taylor, American dancer and choreographer (died 2018)
- 1931 – Kjell Karlsen, Norwegian pianist, composer, and bandleader (died 2020)
- 1931 – Jerry Toppazzini, Canadian ice hockey player (died 2012)
- 1932 – Leslie Fielding, English diplomat (died 2021)
- 1932 – Nancy Kassebaum, American businesswoman and politician (died 2026)
- 1933 – Lou Albano, Italian-American wrestler, manager, and actor (died 2009)
- 1933 – Colin Davis, English race car driver (died 2012)
- 1933 – Robert Fuller, American actor and rancher
- 1933 – Randy Sparks, American folk singer-songwriter and musician (died 2024)
- 1935 – Peter Schreier, German tenor and conductor (died 2019)
- 1936 – Elizabeth Dole, American lawyer and politician, 20th United States Secretary of Labor
- 1937 – Daniel McFadden, American economist and academic, Nobel Prize Laureate
- 1938 – Peter Jennings, Canadian-American journalist and author (died 2005)
- 1938 – Jean Rochon, Canadian physician and politician (died 2021)
- 1940 – Betty Harris, American chemist
- 1940 – Bernard Lafayette, American civil rights movement activist (died 2026)
- 1940 – Winnie Monsod, Filipina economist and political commentator
- 1941 – Jennifer Dunn, American engineer and politician (died 2007)
- 1941 – Goenawan Mohamad, Indonesian poet and playwright
- 1941 – David Warner, English actor (died 2022)
- 1942 – Doug Ashdown, Australian singer-songwriter
- 1942 – Tony Sirico, American actor (died 2022)
- 1943 – David Taylor, English snooker player and sportscaster
- 1944 – Jim Bridwell, American rock climber and mountaineer (died 2018)
- 1945 – Sharon Creech, American author and educator
- 1945 – Mircea Lucescu, Romanian footballer, coach, and manager (died 2026)
- 1946 – Ximena Armas, Chilean painter
- 1946 – Stig Blomqvist, Swedish race car driver
- 1946 – Neal Doughty, American keyboard player, songwriter, and producer
- 1946 – Alessandro Gogna, Italian mountaineer and adventurer
- 1946 – Diane Keen, English actress
- 1946 – Aleksei Tammiste, Estonian basketball player
- 1947 – Dick Harmon, American golfer and coach (died 2006)
- 1948 – John Clarke, New Zealand-Australian comedian, actor, producer, and screenwriter (died 2017)
- 1949 – Leslie Easterbrook, American actress
- 1949 – Jamil Mahuad, Ecuadorian lawyer and politician, 51st President of Ecuador
- 1950 – Jenny Holzer, American painter, author, and dancer
- 1950 – Mike Starr, American actor
- 1951 – Susan Blackmore, English psychologist and theorist
- 1951 – Dan Driessen, American baseball player and coach
- 1951 – Dean Pitchford, American actor, director, screenwriter, and composer
- 1952 – Norman Blackwell, Baron Blackwell, English businessman and politician
- 1952 – Joe Johnson, English snooker player and sportscaster
- 1952 – Marie Panayotopoulos-Cassiotou, Greek politician
- 1952 – Scott Wedman, American basketball player
- 1953 – Ken Burns, American director and producer
- 1953 – Tim Gunn, American television host and actor
- 1953 – Geddy Lee, Canadian musician
- 1953 – Frank McGuinness, Irish poet and playwright
- 1953 – Patti Scialfa, American musician
- 1955 – Jean-Hugues Anglade, French actor, director, and screenwriter
- 1955 – Dave Stevens, American illustrator (died 2008)
- 1955 – Stephen Timms, English politician, Minister of State for Competitiveness
- 1956 – Teddy Atlas, American boxer, trainer, and sportscaster
- 1956 – Ronnie Musgrove, American lawyer and politician, 62nd Governor of Mississippi
- 1956 – Faustino Rupérez, Spanish cyclist
- 1957 – Liam Davison, Australian author and educator (died 2014)
- 1957 – Viktor Gavrikov, Lithuanian-Swiss chess player (died 2016)
- 1957 – Nellie Kim, Russian gymnast and coach
- 1958 – Gail Dines, English-American author, activist, and academic
- 1958 – Simon Nye, English screenwriter and producer
- 1958 – Cynthia Rowley, American fashion designer
- 1959 – Sanjay Dutt, Indian actor, singer, and producer
- 1959 – Ruud Janssen, Dutch blogger and illustrator
- 1959 – Dave LaPoint, American baseball player and manager
- 1959 – John Sykes, English singer-songwriter and guitarist (died 2024)
- 1959 – Dirk Graham, Canadian ice hockey player and coach
- 1960 – Didier Van Cauwelaert, French author
- 1962 – Carl Cox, English DJ and producer
- 1962 – Frank Neubarth, German footballer and manager
- 1962 – Vincent Rousseau, Belgian runner
- 1962 – Scott Steiner, American wrestler
- 1963 – Hans-Holger Albrecht, Belgian-German businessman
- 1963 – Jim Beglin, Irish footballer and sportscaster
- 1963 – Julie Elliott, English politician
- 1963 – Azeem Hafeez, Pakistani cricketer
- 1963 – Alexandra Paul, American actress and producer
- 1963 – Graham Poll, English footballer, referee, and journalist
- 1964 – Jaanus Veensalu, Estonian footballer
- 1965 – Luis Alicea, Puerto Rican-American baseball player and coach
- 1965 – Dean Haglund, Canadian actor, producer, and screenwriter
- 1965 – Adam Holloway, English captain and politician
- 1965 – Stan Koziol, American soccer player (died 2014)
- 1965 – Chang-Rae Lee, South Korean-American author and academic
- 1965 – Xavier Waterkeyn, Australian author
- 1965 – Woody Weatherman, American guitarist and songwriter
- 1966 – Sally Gunnell, English hurdler and sportscaster
- 1966 – Stuart Lampitt, English cricketer
- 1966 – Martina McBride, American singer-songwriter and producer
- 1966 – Debbie Black, American basketball player and coach
- 1968 – Paavo Lötjönen, Finnish cellist and educator
- 1969 – Timothy Omundson, American actor
- 1970 – Adele Griffin, American author
- 1970 – Andi Peters, English journalist, actor, and producer
- 1970 – John Rennie, Zimbabwean cricketer
- 1971 – Andrea Philipp, German sprinter
- 1972 – Anssi Kela, Finnish singer and songwriter
- 1972 – Wil Wheaton, American actor, producer, and screenwriter
- 1973 – Stephen Dorff, American actor and producer
- 1973 – Denis Urubko, Kazakh mountaineer
- 1974 – Josh Radnor, American actor and musician
- 1975 – Yoshihiro Akiyama, Japanese mixed martial artist
- 1975 – Lanka de Silva, Sri Lankan cricketer
- 1975 – Corrado Grabbi, Italian footballer
- 1975 – Jaanus Sirel, Estonian footballer
- 1978 – Mike Adams, American baseball player
- 1978 – Marina Lazarovska, Macedonian tennis player
- 1979 – Karim Essediri, Tunisian footballer
- 1979 – Ronald Murray, American basketball player
- 1980 – Ryan Braun, Canadian-American baseball player
- 1980 – Fernando González, Chilean tennis player
- 1980 – Ben Koller, American drummer
- 1980 – John Morris, Australian rugby league player
- 1981 – Fernando Alonso, Spanish race car driver
- 1981 – Andrés Madrid, Argentinian footballer
- 1981 – Troy Perkins, American soccer player
- 1982 – Janez Aljančič, Slovenian footballer
- 1982 – Jônatas Domingos, Brazilian footballer
- 1982 – Allison Mack, American actress and criminal
- 1983 – Jason Belmonte, Australian bowler
- 1983 – Inés Gómez Mont, Mexican journalist and actress
- 1983 – Alexei Kaigorodov, Russian ice hockey player
- 1983 – Jerious Norwood, American football player
- 1983 – Elise Testone, American singer-songwriter
- 1984 – Oh Beom-seok, South Korean footballer
- 1984 – Chad Billingsley, American baseball player
- 1984 – Wilson Palacios, Honduran footballer
- 1985 – Okinoumi Ayumi, Japanese sumo wrestler
- 1985 – Besart Berisha, Albanian footballer
- 1985 – Jonatan Maidana, Argentine footballer
- 1985 – Simon Santoso, Indonesian badminton player
- 1988 – Tarjei Bø, Norwegian biathlete
- 1989 – Grit Šadeiko, Estonian heptathlete
- 1990 – Shin Se-kyung, South Korean actress, singer and model
- 1991 – Dale Copley, Australian rugby league player
- 1991 – Irakli Logua, Russian footballer
- 1992 – Djibril Sidibé, French footballer
- 1992 – Karen Torrez, Bolivian swimmer
- 1993 – Nicole Melichar, American tennis player
- 1993 – Ayoze Pérez, Spanish footballer
- 1993 – Dak Prescott, American football player
- 1994 – Liam O'Brien, Canadian ice hockey player
- 1994 – Daniele Rugani, Italian footballer
- 1995 – Neal Pionk, American ice hockey player
- 1998 – Mirjam Björklund, Swedish tennis player
- 1998 – Clayton Keller, American ice hockey player
- 1998 – Tijjani Reijnders, Dutch footballer
- 1999 – Mone Inami
- 2000 – Yacine Adli, French footballer
- 2003 – Johnny Brackins, American long jumper and hurdler
- 2003 – Jens Castrop, German-South Korean footballer
- 2003 – Renato Veiga, Portuguese footballer

== Deaths ==
=== Pre-1600 ===
- 238 – Balbinus, Roman emperor (born 165)
- 238 – Pupienus, Roman emperor (born 178)
- 451 – Tuoba Huang, prince of Northern Wei (born 428)
- 796 – Offa of Mercia (born 730)
- 846 – Li Shen, chancellor of the Tang Dynasty
- 1030 – Olaf II of Norway (born 995)
- 1095 – Ladislaus I of Hungary (born 1040)
- 1099 – Pope Urban II (born 1042)
- 1108 – Philip I of France (born 1052)
- 1236 – Ingeborg of Denmark, Queen of France (born 1175)
- 1326 – Richard Óg de Burgh, 2nd Earl of Ulster (born 1259)
- 1504 – Thomas Stanley, 1st Earl of Derby (born 1435)
- 1507 – Martin Behaim, German-Bohemian geographer and astronomer (born 1459)
- 1573 – John Caius, English physician and academic (born 1510)

=== 1601–1900 ===
- 1612 – Jacques Bongars, French scholar and diplomat (born 1554)
- 1644 – Pope Urban VIII (born 1568)
- 1752 – Peter Warren, Irish admiral and politician (born 1703)
- 1781 – Johann Kies, German astronomer and mathematician (born 1713)
- 1792 – René Nicolas Charles Augustin de Maupeou, French lawyer and politician, Chancellor of France (born 1714)
- 1813 – Jean-Andoche Junot, French general (born 1771)
- 1833 – William Wilberforce, English philanthropist and politician (born 1759)
- 1839 – Gaspard de Prony, French mathematician and engineer (born 1755)
- 1844 – Franz Xaver Wolfgang Mozart, Austrian pianist, composer, and conductor (born 1791)
- 1856 – Robert Schumann, German composer and critic (born 1810)
- 1857 – Thomas Dick, Scottish minister, astronomer, and author (born 1774)
- 1887 – Agostino Depretis, Italian politician, 9th Prime Minister of Italy (born 1813)
- 1890 – Vincent van Gogh, Dutch painter and illustrator (born 1853)
- 1895 – Floriano Peixoto, Brazilian general and politician, 2nd President of Brazil (born 1839)
- 1900 – Umberto I of Italy (born 1844)

=== 1901–present ===
- 1908 – Marie Adam-Doerrer, Swiss women's rights activist and unionist (born 1838)
- 1913 – Tobias Asser, Dutch lawyer and jurist, Nobel Prize Laureate (born 1838)
- 1918 – Ernest William Christmas, Australian-American painter (born 1863)
- 1924 – Sotirios Krokidas, Greek educator and politician, 110th Prime Minister of Greece (born 1852)
- 1934 – Didier Pitre, Canadian ice hockey player (born 1883)
- 1938 – Nikolai Krylenko, Russian lawyer, jurist, and politician, Prosecutor General of the Russian SFSR (born 1885)
- 1950 – Joe Fry, English race car driver (born 1915)
- 1951 – Ali Sami Yen, Turkish footballer and manager, founded Galatasaray S.K. (born 1886)
- 1954 – Coen de Koning, Dutch speed skater (born 1879)
- 1960 – Hasan Saka, Turkish politician, 7th Prime Minister of Turkey (born 1885)
- 1962 – Ronald Fisher, English biologist and statistician (born 1890)
- 1962 – Leonardo De Lorenzo, Italian-American flute player and educator (born 1875)
- 1964 – Vean Gregg, American baseball player (born 1885)
- 1966 – Johnson Aguiyi-Ironsi, Nigerian general and politician, 2nd Head of State of Nigeria (born 1924)
- 1966 – Adekunle Fajuyi, Nigerian colonel (born 1926)
- 1970 – John Barbirolli, English cellist and conductor (born 1899)
- 1973 – Norm Smith, Australian footballer and coach (born 1915)
- 1973 – Roger Williamson, English race car driver (born 1948)
- 1974 – Cass Elliot, American singer (born 1941)
- 1974 – Erich Kästner, German author and poet (born 1899)
- 1976 – Mickey Cohen, American gangster (born 1913)
- 1978 – Andrzej Bogucki, Polish actor, operetta singer, and songwriter (born 1904)
- 1979 – Herbert Marcuse, German sociologist and philosopher (born 1898)
- 1979 – Bill Todman, American screenwriter and producer (born 1916)
- 1981 – Robert Moses, American urban planner, designed the Northern State Parkway and Southern State Parkway (born 1888)
- 1981 – Sydney Kyte, British bandleader (born 1896)
- 1982 – Harold Sakata, American wrestler and actor (born 1920)
- 1982 – Vladimir K. Zworykin, Russian-American engineer, invented the Iconoscope (born 1889)
- 1983 – Luis Buñuel, Spanish actor, director, and screenwriter (born 1900)
- 1983 – Raymond Massey, Canadian-American actor and screenwriter (born 1896)
- 1983 – David Niven, English military officer and actor (born 1910)
- 1984 – Fred Waring, American television host and bandleader (born 1900)
- 1987 – Bibhutibhushan Mukhopadhyay, Indian author, poet, and playwright (born 1894)
- 1990 – Bruno Kreisky, Austrian academic and politician, 22nd Chancellor of Austria (born 1911)
- 1991 – Christian de Castries, French general (born 1902)
- 1992 – Michel Larocque, Canadian ice hockey player and manager (born 1952)
- 1994 – John Britton, American physician (born 1925)
- 1994 – Dorothy Hodgkin, Egyptian-English biochemist and biophysicist, Nobel Prize laureate (born 1910)
- 1995 – Les Elgart, American trumpet player and bandleader (born 1917)
- 1996 – Ric Nordman, Canadian businessman and politician (born 1919)
- 1996 – Marcel-Paul Schützenberger, French mathematician and theorist (born 1920)
- 1996 – Jason Thirsk, American singer and bass player (born 1967)
- 1998 – Jerome Robbins, American director, producer, and choreographer (born 1918)
- 2000 – René Favaloro, Argentine cardiac surgeon (born 1923)
- 2001 – Edward Gierek, Polish soldier and politician (born 1913)
- 2001 – Wau Holland, German computer scientist, co-founded Chaos Computer Club (born 1951)
- 2003 – Foday Sankoh, Sierra Leonean soldier, founded the Revolutionary United Front (born 1937)
- 2004 – Rena Vlahopoulou, Greek actress and singer (born 1923)
- 2007 – Mike Reid, English comedian, actor, and author (born 1940)
- 2007 – Michel Serrault, French actor (born 1928)
- 2007 – Tom Snyder, American journalist and talk show host (born 1936)
- 2007 – Marvin Zindler, American journalist (born 1921)
- 2008 – Bruce Edward Ivins, American scientist and bio-defense researcher (born 1946)
- 2010 – Charles E. Wicks, American chemist and academic (born 1925)
- 2012 – Tatiana Egorova, Russian footballer and manager (born 1970)
- 2012 – August Kowalczyk, Polish actor and director (born 1921)
- 2012 – Chris Marker, French photographer and journalist (born 1921)
- 2012 – James Mellaart, English archaeologist and author (born 1925)
- 2012 – John Stampe, Danish footballer and coach (born 1957)
- 2013 – Christian Benítez, Ecuadorian footballer (born 1986)
- 2013 – Peter Flanigan, American banker and civil servant (born 1923)
- 2013 – Tony Gaze, Australian soldier, pilot, and race car driver (born 1920)
- 2013 – Munir Hussain, Indian cricketer and sportscaster (born 1929)
- 2014 – M. Caldwell Butler, American soldier, lawyer, and politician (born 1925)
- 2014 – Jon R. Cavaiani, English-American sergeant, Medal of Honor recipient (born 1943)
- 2014 – Giorgio Gaslini, Italian pianist and composer (born 1929)
- 2014 – María Antonia Iglesias, Spanish journalist and author (born 1945)
- 2014 – Péter Kiss, Hungarian engineer and politician (born 1959)
- 2014 – Idris Muhammad, American drummer and composer (born 1939)
- 2014 – Thomas R. St. George, American soldier and author (born 1919)
- 2015 – Antony Holland, English-Canadian actor, director, and playwright (born 1920)
- 2015 – Peter O'Sullevan, Anglo-Irish sportscaster (born 1918)
- 2015 – Mike Pyle, American football player and sportscaster (born 1939)
- 2015 – Franklin H. Westervelt, American computer scientist, engineer, and academic (born 1930)
- 2018 – Oliver Dragojević, Croatian recording artist (born 1947)
- 2018 – Nikolai Volkoff, Yugoslav-born American professional wrestler (born 1947)
- 2025 - Alon Abutbul, Israeli film, television and theater actor (born 1965)

== Holidays and observances ==
- Christian feast day:
  - Lazarus of Bethany
  - Lupus of Troyes
  - Martha of Bethany (Catholic, Anglican, and Lutheran Church)
  - Mary of Bethany
  - Olaf II of Norway
  - Simplicius, Faustinus and Beatrix
  - William Pinchon
  - July 29 (Eastern Orthodox liturgics)
- Earliest day on which Somer's Day can fall, while August 4 is the latest; celebrated on Friday before the first Monday in August. (Bermuda)
- International Tiger Day
- Mohun Bagan Day (India)
- National Anthem Day (Romania)
- National Thai Language Day (Thailand)
- Ólavsøka or Olsok, opening of the Løgting session. (Faroe Islands and the Nordic countries)
