= Sopocachi =

- Barrio
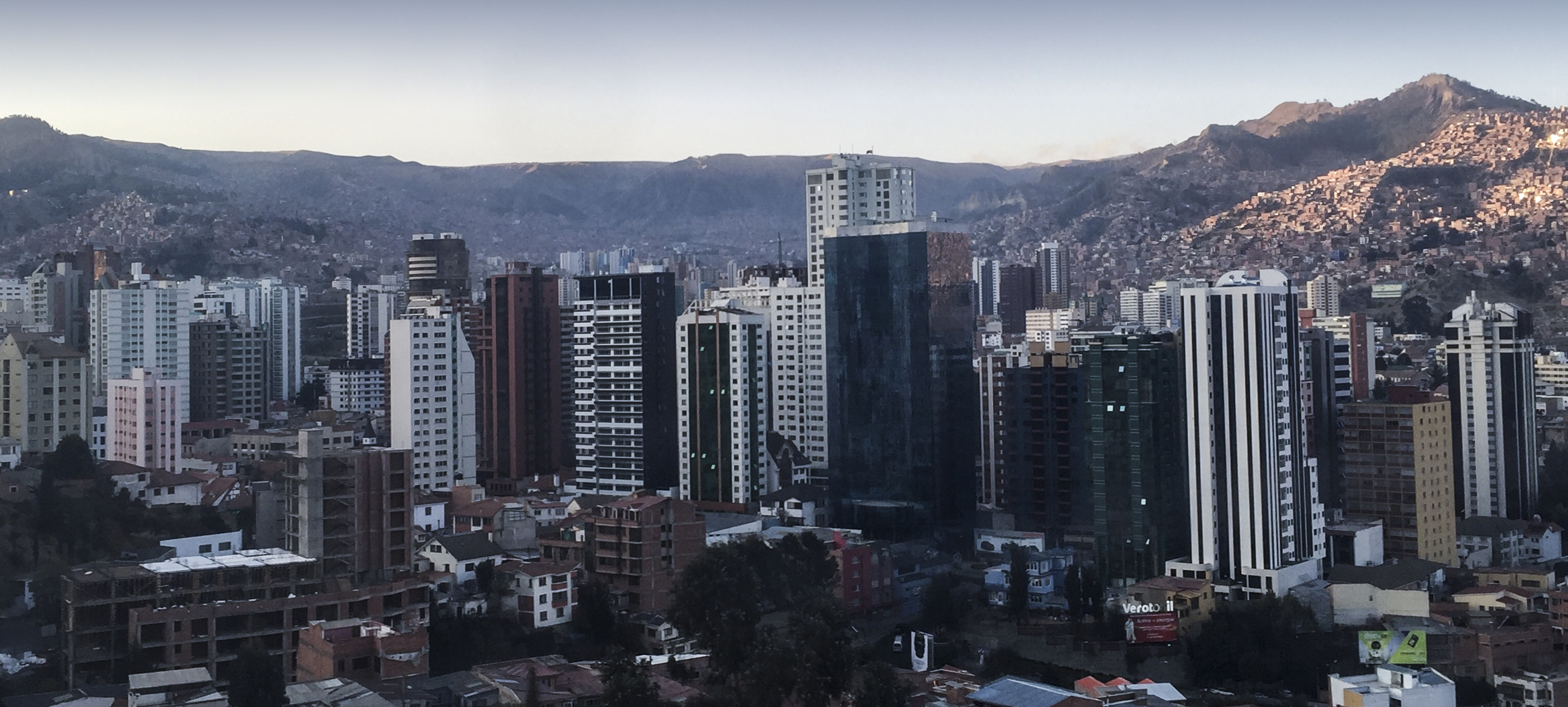
- Aerial view of Sopocachi
- Interactive map of Sopocachi
- Country: Bolivia
- Municipality: La Paz
- Time zone: UTC-4 (BOT)

Sopocachi is a neighborhood in La Paz, Bolivia. Founded during the republican era, Sopocachi can be described as a bohemian artistic neighborhood. It is located in the central part of the city, and is part of the Cotahuma district. Sopocachi is mainly a residential area, being one of the biggest residential districts of the city, along with Calacoto. Some of the city's largest buildings are located there. The Plaza Abaroa (Abaroa Square), Plaza España (Spain Square), two medium-size important squares, and the Montículo, a big hill with monumental areas, are located in Sopocachi. The architecture includes both modern and 1800s designs. The nightlife is bustling with bars, pubs, and discos all around the area. Various genres of music blast from these places. Monticulo Park is also located here. You can view the Illimani Mountain and the beautiful views of the city from here. A carved stone gate marks the entrance to the park which has been there since the 1770s.

It is connected with San Jorge, in the east, and Cristo Rey, in the west, neighborhoods and with Downtown La Paz in the north. The residents of Sopocachi tend to be people with middle to high socioeconomic status from all ages. San Jorge also has one of the biggest cinemas in the city named Multicine.

In this neighborhood is also located the academy of fine arts (Academia de Bellas Artes); and the national conservatory of music (Conservatorio Nacional de Música), founded in 1907.

== El Montículo ==
Old photos of Sopocachi
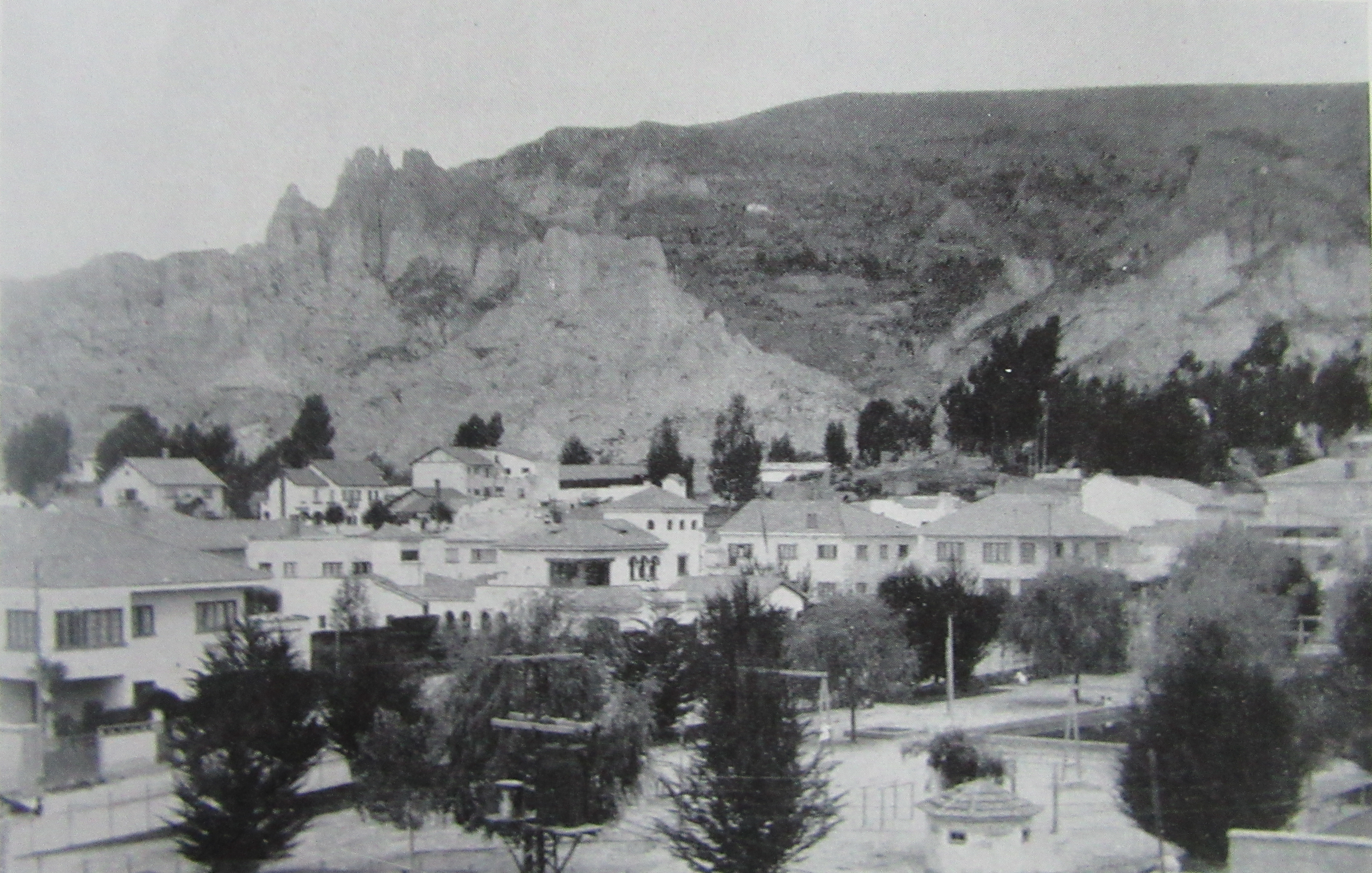
The children's playground in a square in the area of Tembladerani, Sopocachi, 1948.

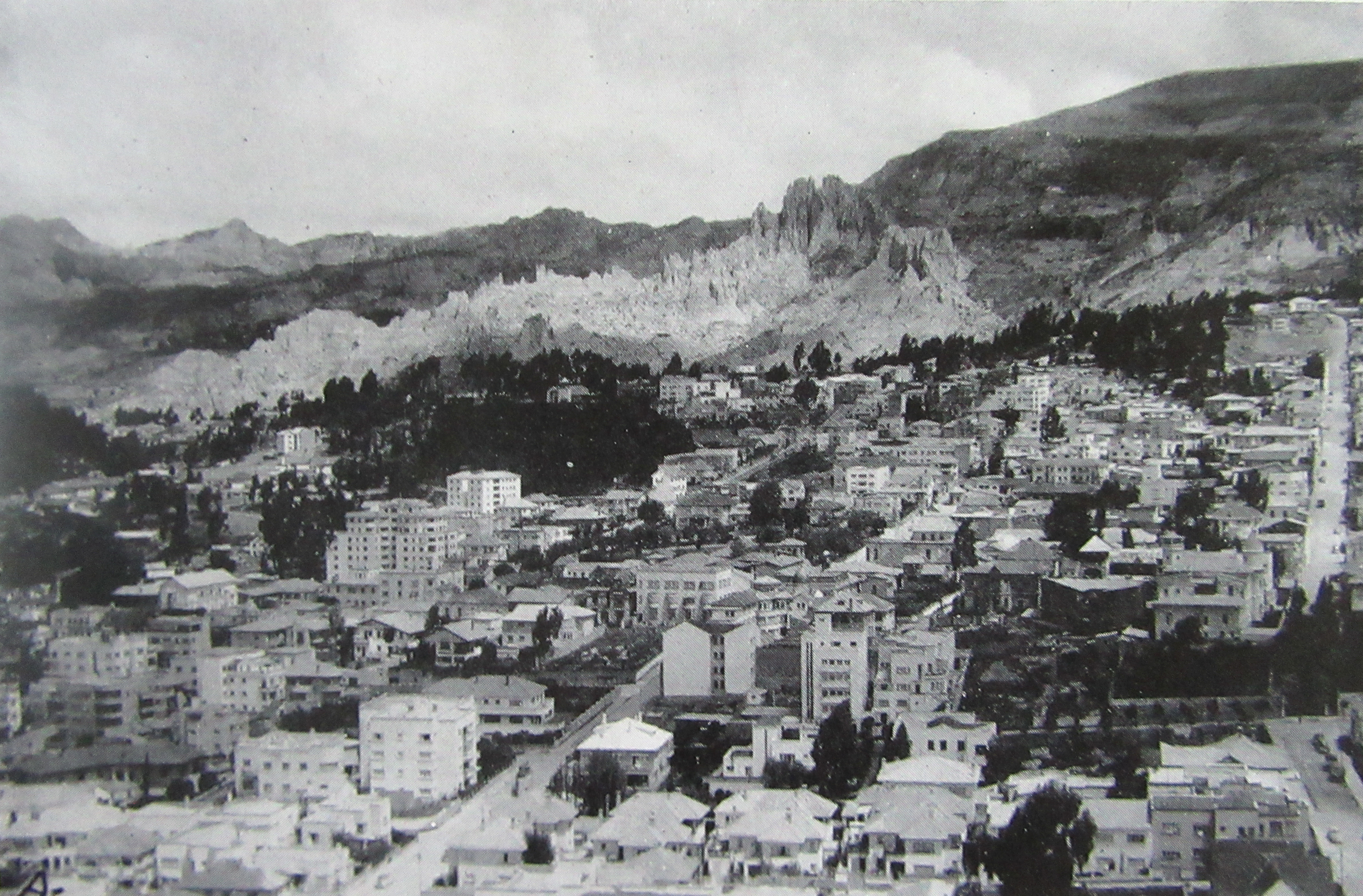
Aerial view of Sopocachi,1948.

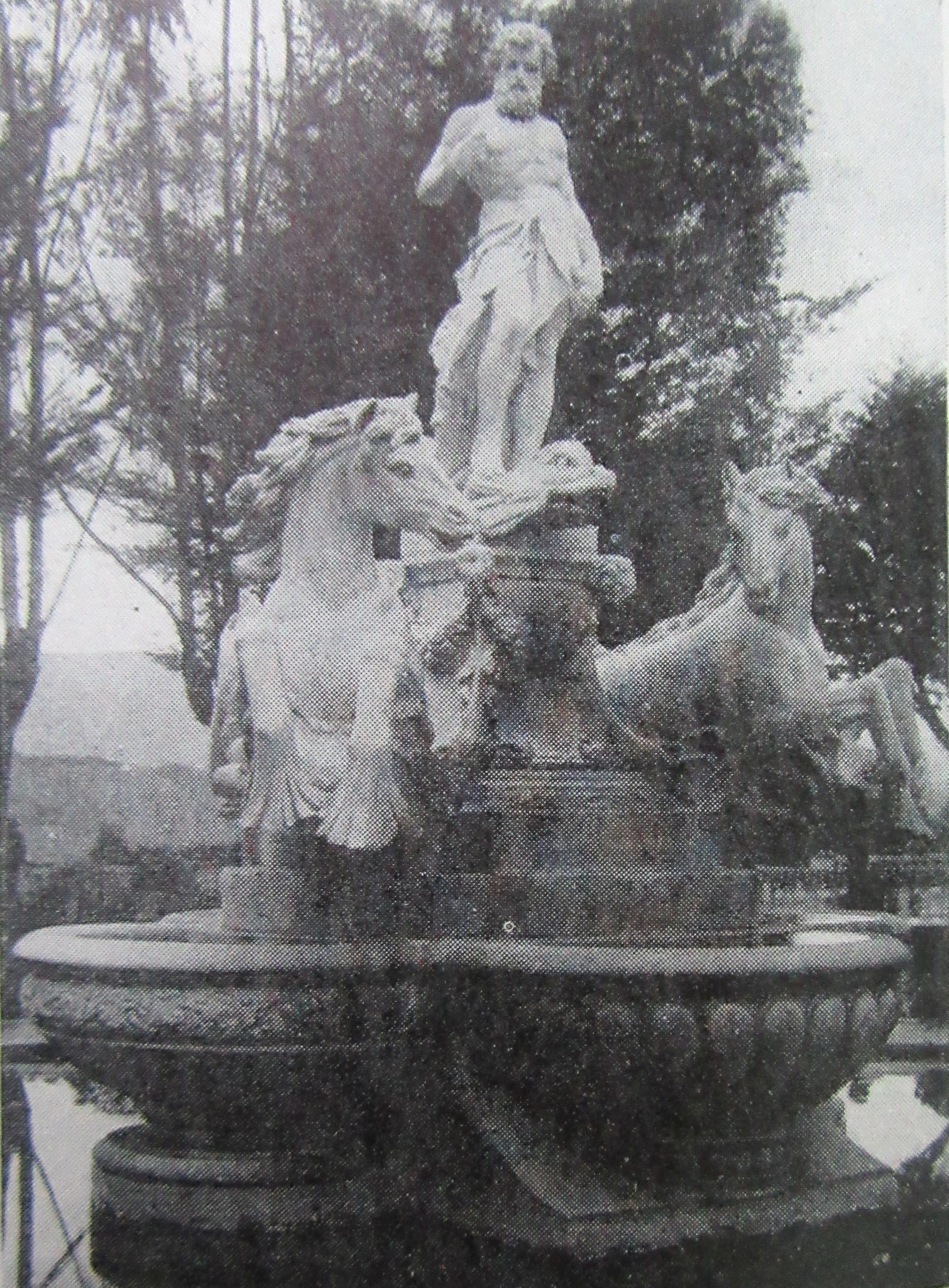
Artistic fountain in El Montículo Park, 1948.

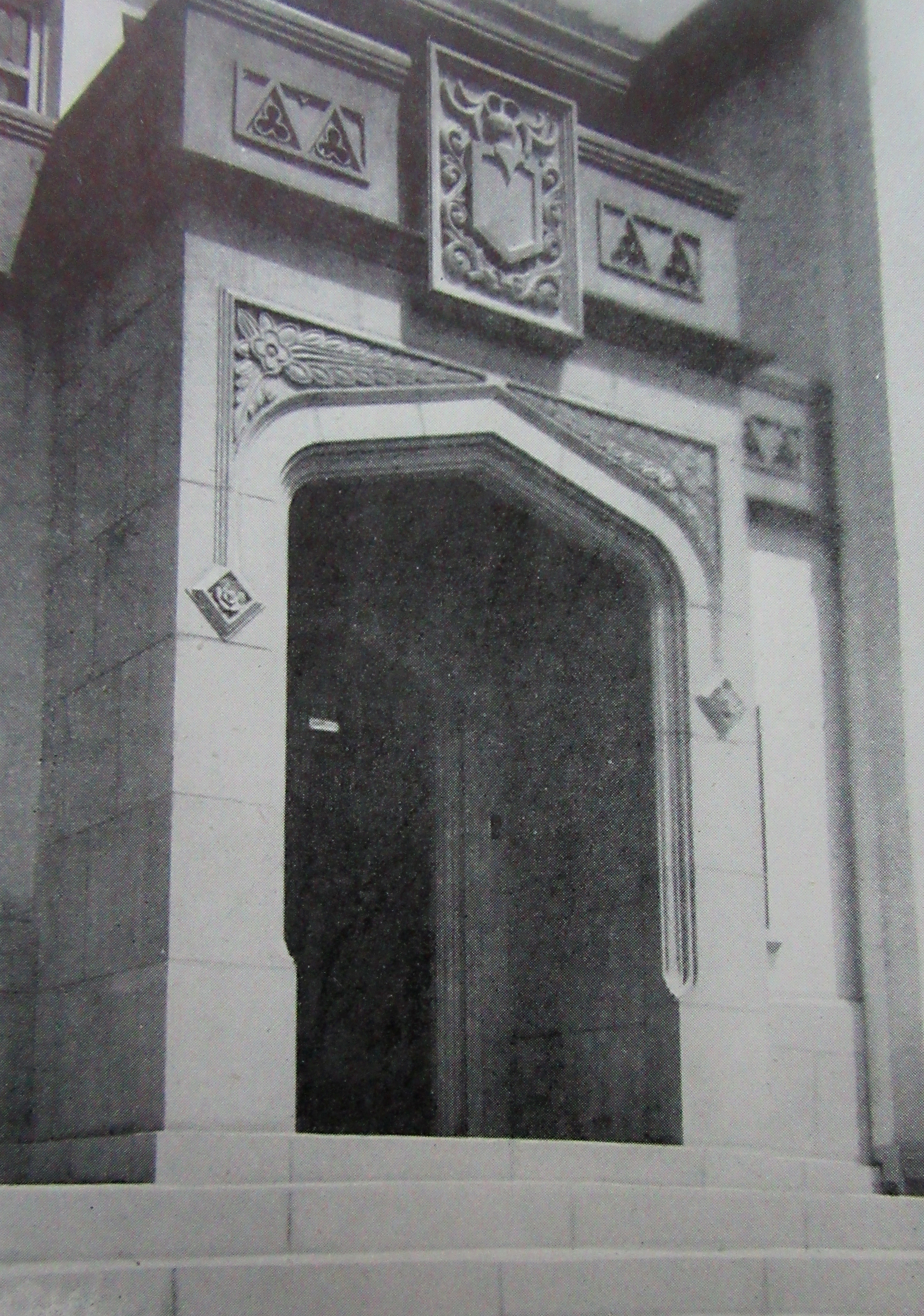
Facade of the legation of Spain, on Avenida Arce, 1948.

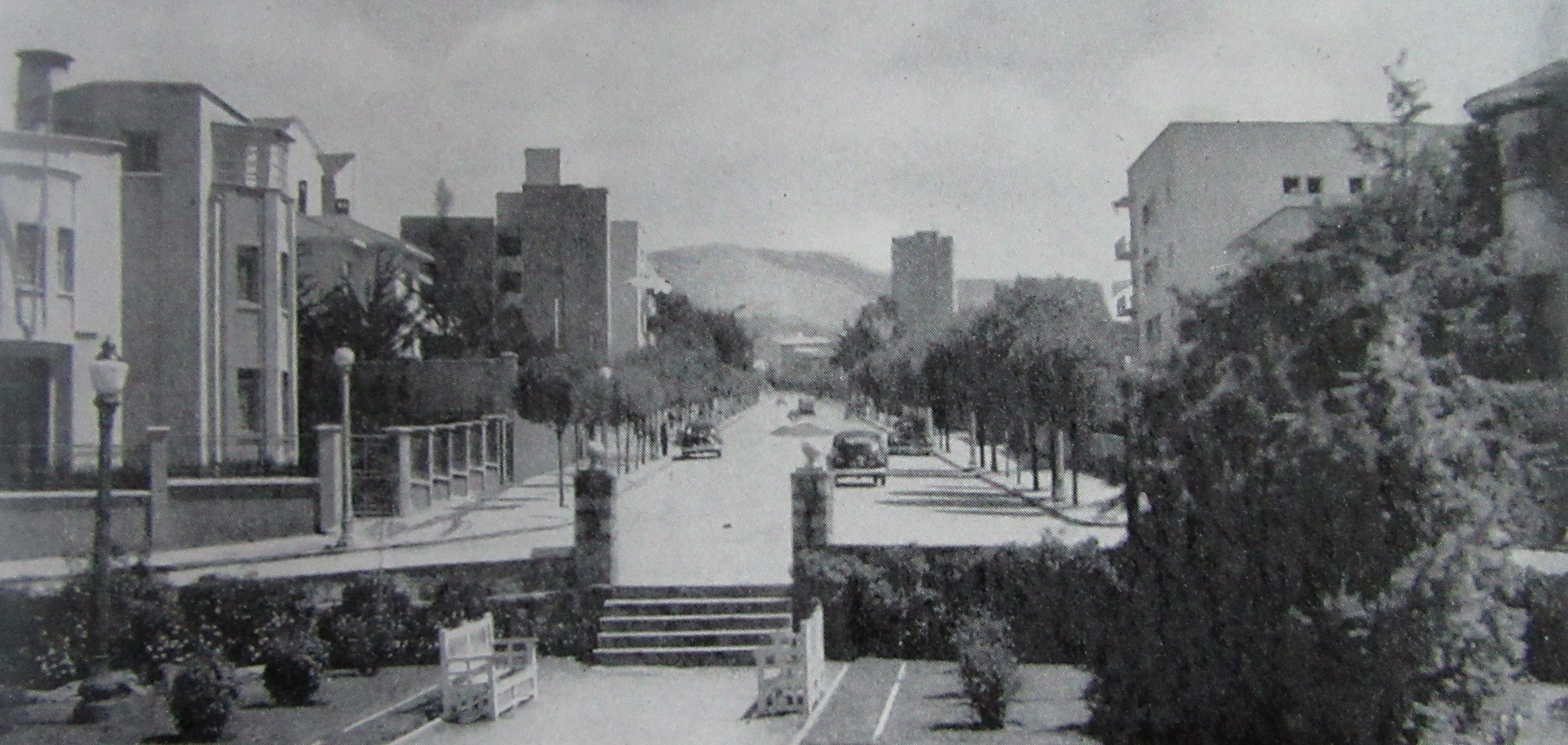
Avenida Arce, 1948.

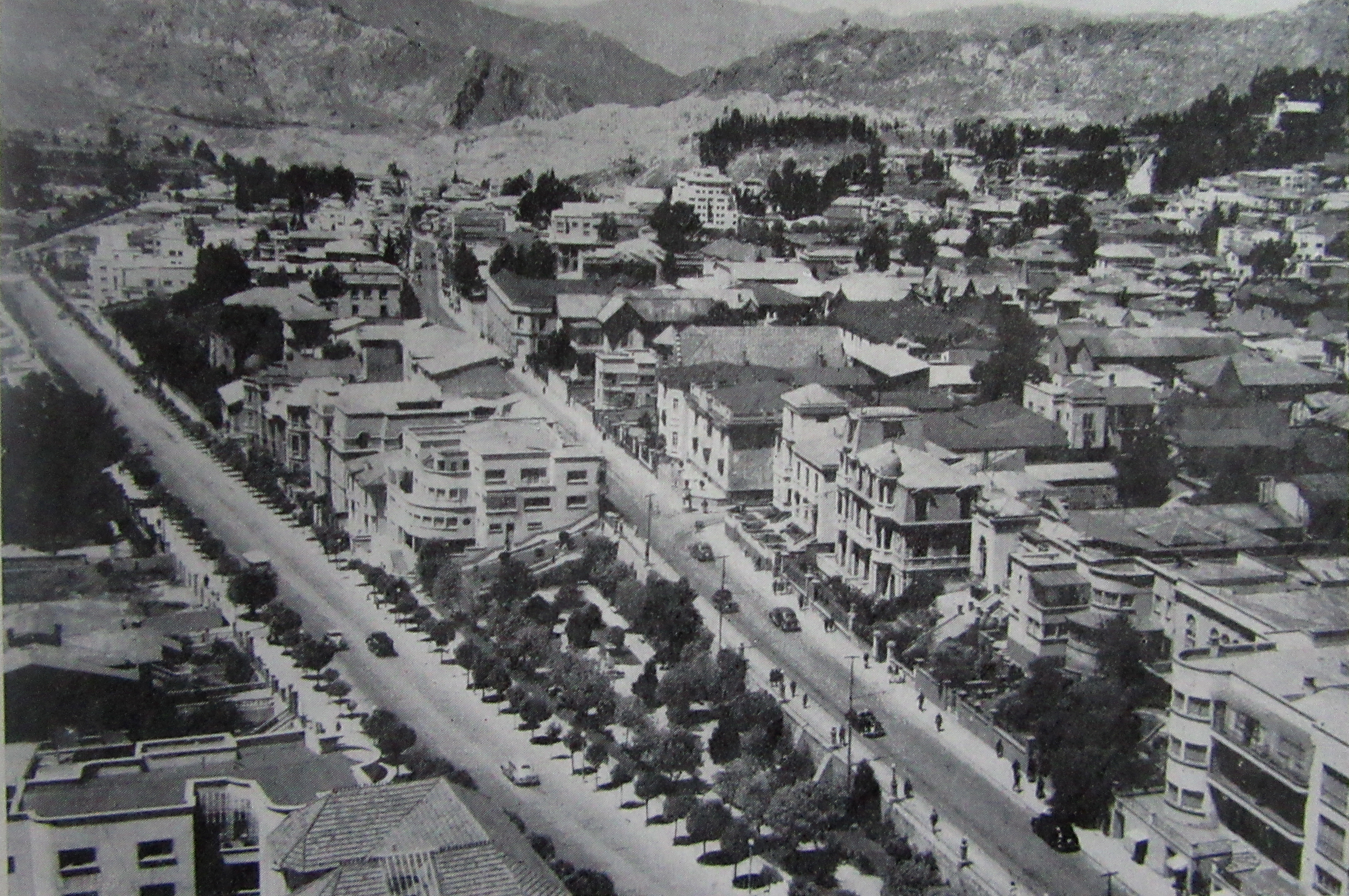
Arce and 6 de Agosto avenues, with a section of the city, La Paz, Bolivia,1948.

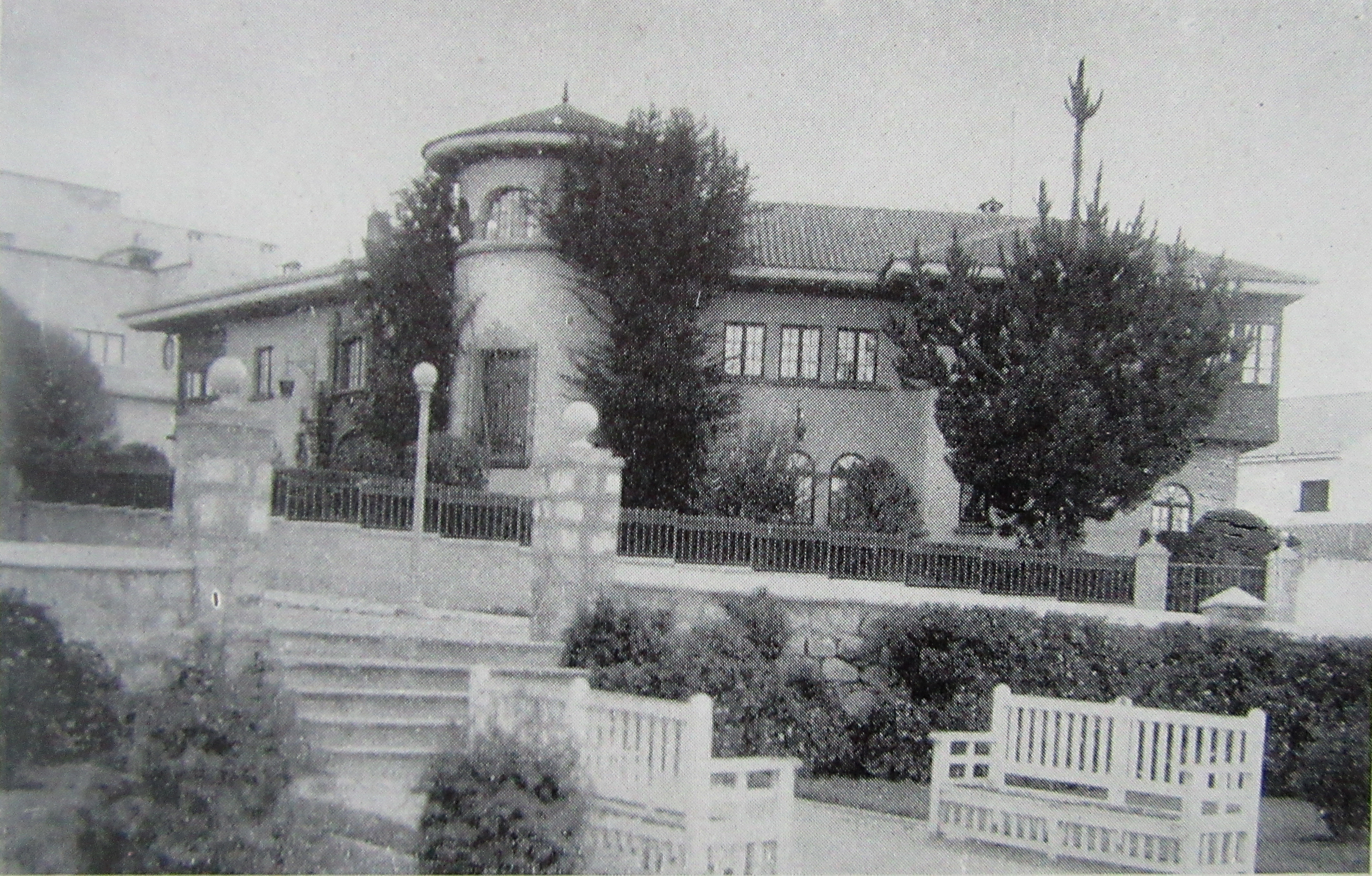
A residential house located on Avenida Arce, La Paz, Bolivia,1948.

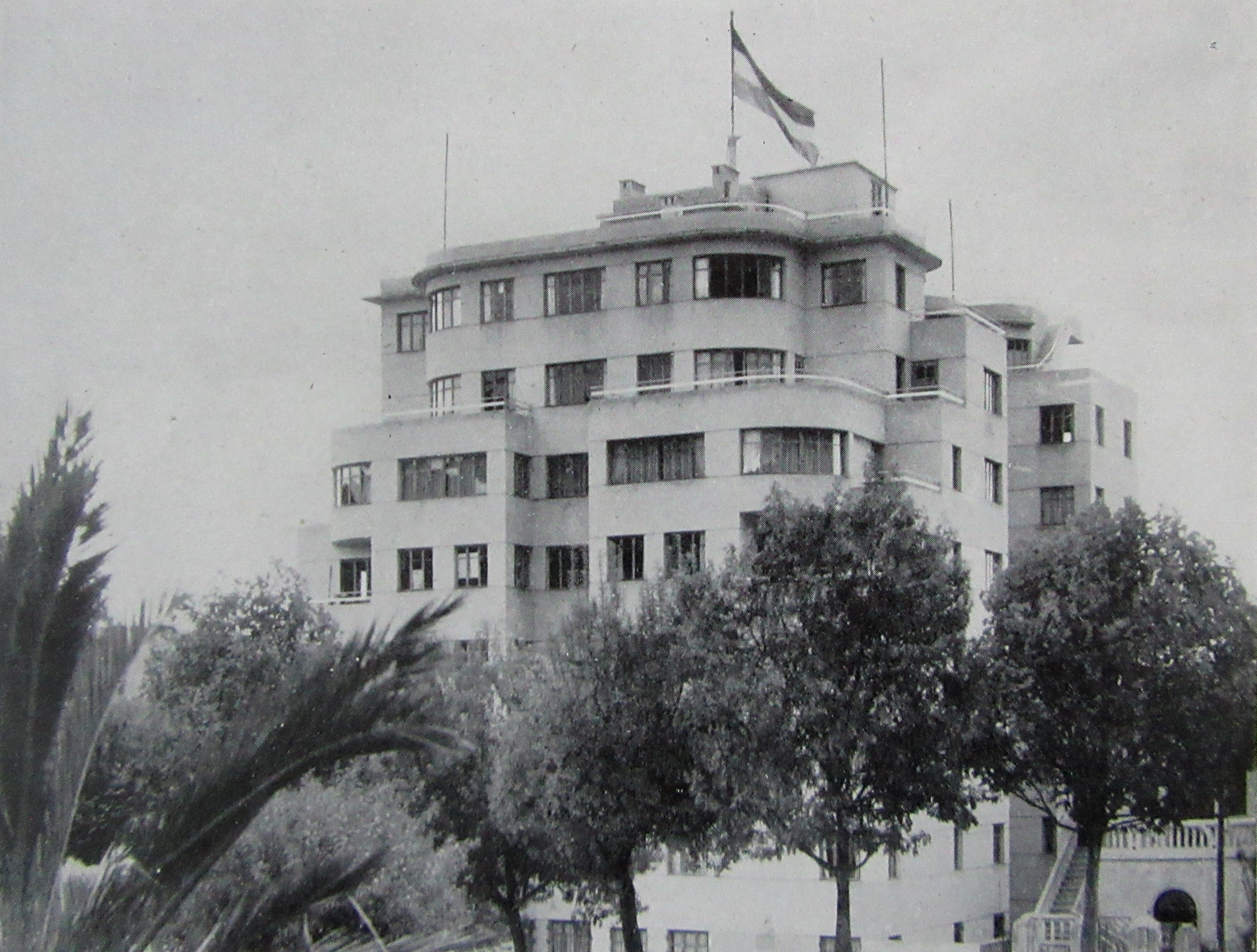
Building of the Ministry of Defense, on Abaroa Square, La Paz, Bolivia,1948.

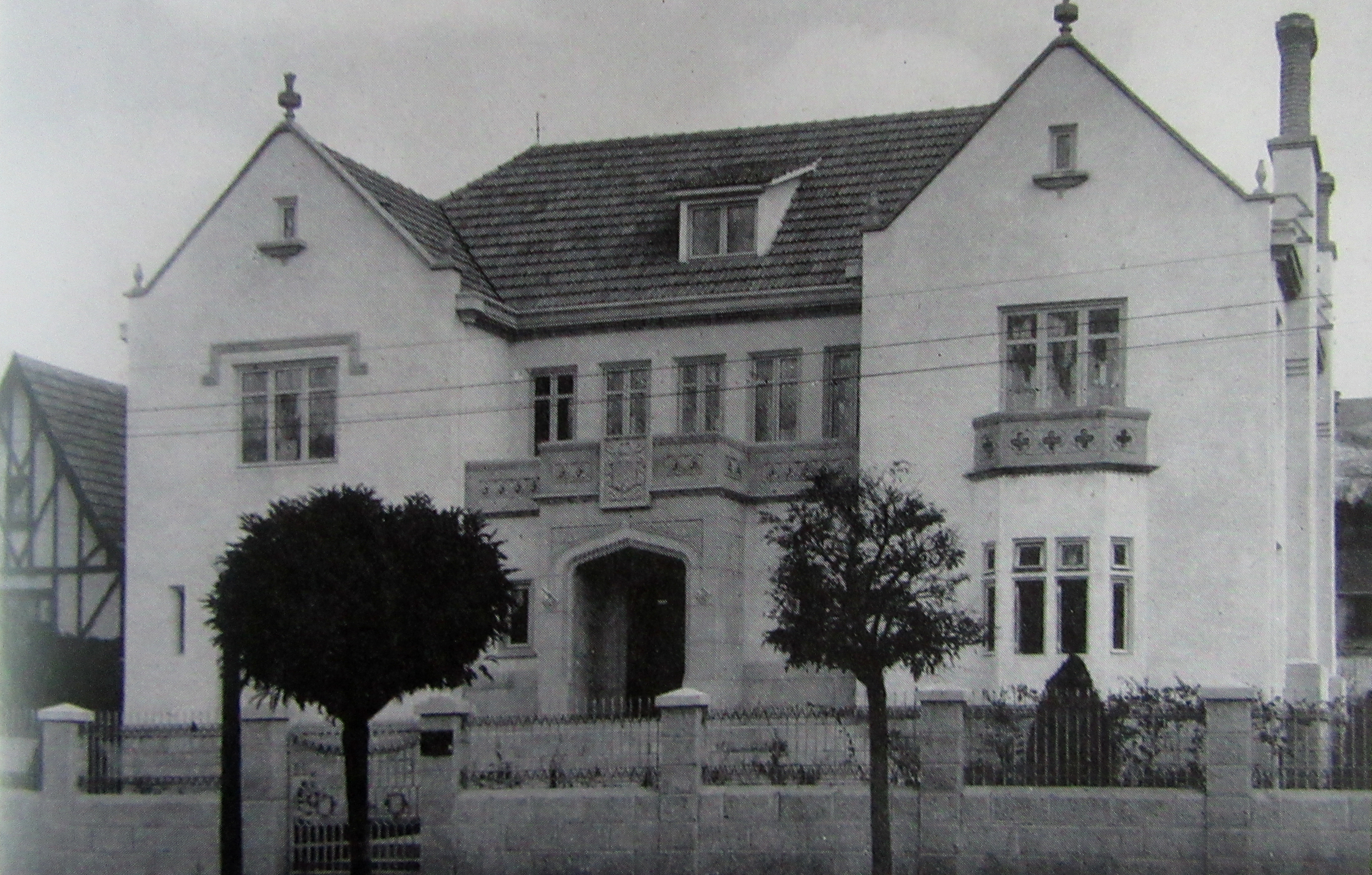
The building used by the legation of Spain, in Avenida Arce Avenue, La Paz, Bolivia,1948.

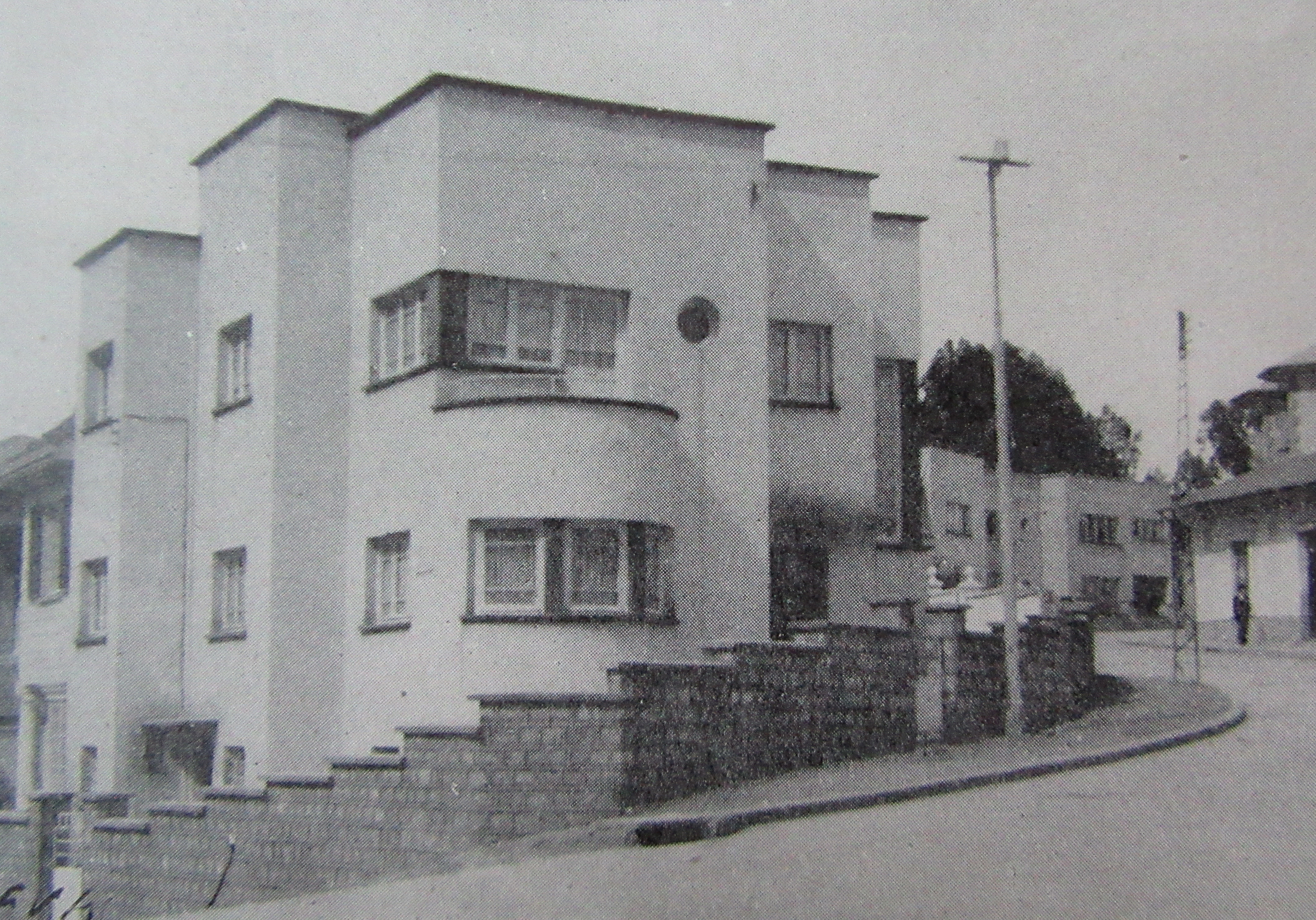
A residential house at the end of Avenida Arce,1948.

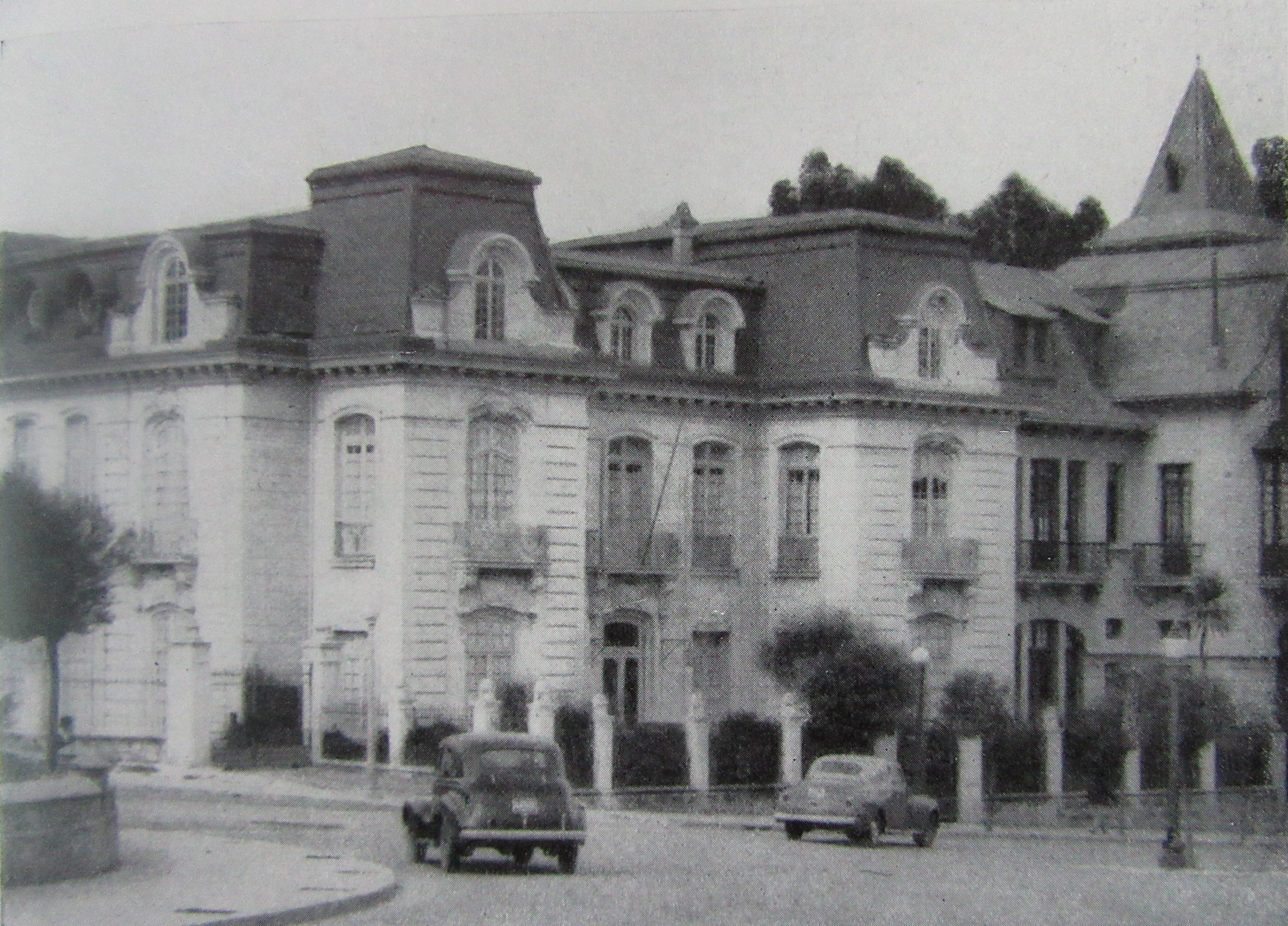
A residential house at the end of Avenida Arce, Plaza Isabel La Católica,1948.
