= Ladislao Cabrera =

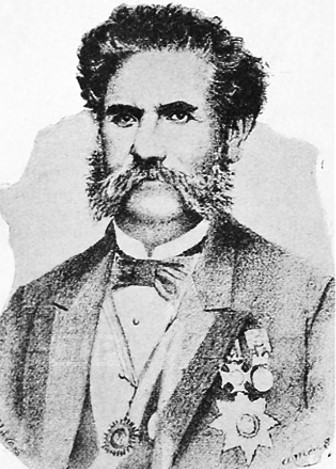
Ladislao Cabrera in 1879

Ladislao Cabrera (May 23, 1830 – 1921) was a Bolivian hero during the War of the Pacific. Born in Totora, Cochabamba Department, Carrasco Province, he is famous for organising the defence of Calama against the Chilean invaders in the War of the Pacific.

Ladislao Cabrera studied and graduated as a lawyer in Arequipa, Peru. He returned to Bolivia and was named prefect of Cobija, but was removed from office during the government of Mariano Melgarejo, after that he was a forensic specialist in the province of Calama.

When he found out about the invasion of Chile of Antofagasta during the War of the Pacific he organized the defence of Calama with 135 Bolivians in the Battle of Topáter, resulting in a Bolivian defeat after fierce resistance to Chilean forces.

After the defeat he went to Chiu Chiu, and then he moved to La Paz, where he managed to be an ambassador and interim president of Bolivia in the year 1881.

He died in Sucre in December 1921.

Ladislao Cabrera Province is named in his honour.
