= Día del Mar =

Bolivian holiday observed 23 March

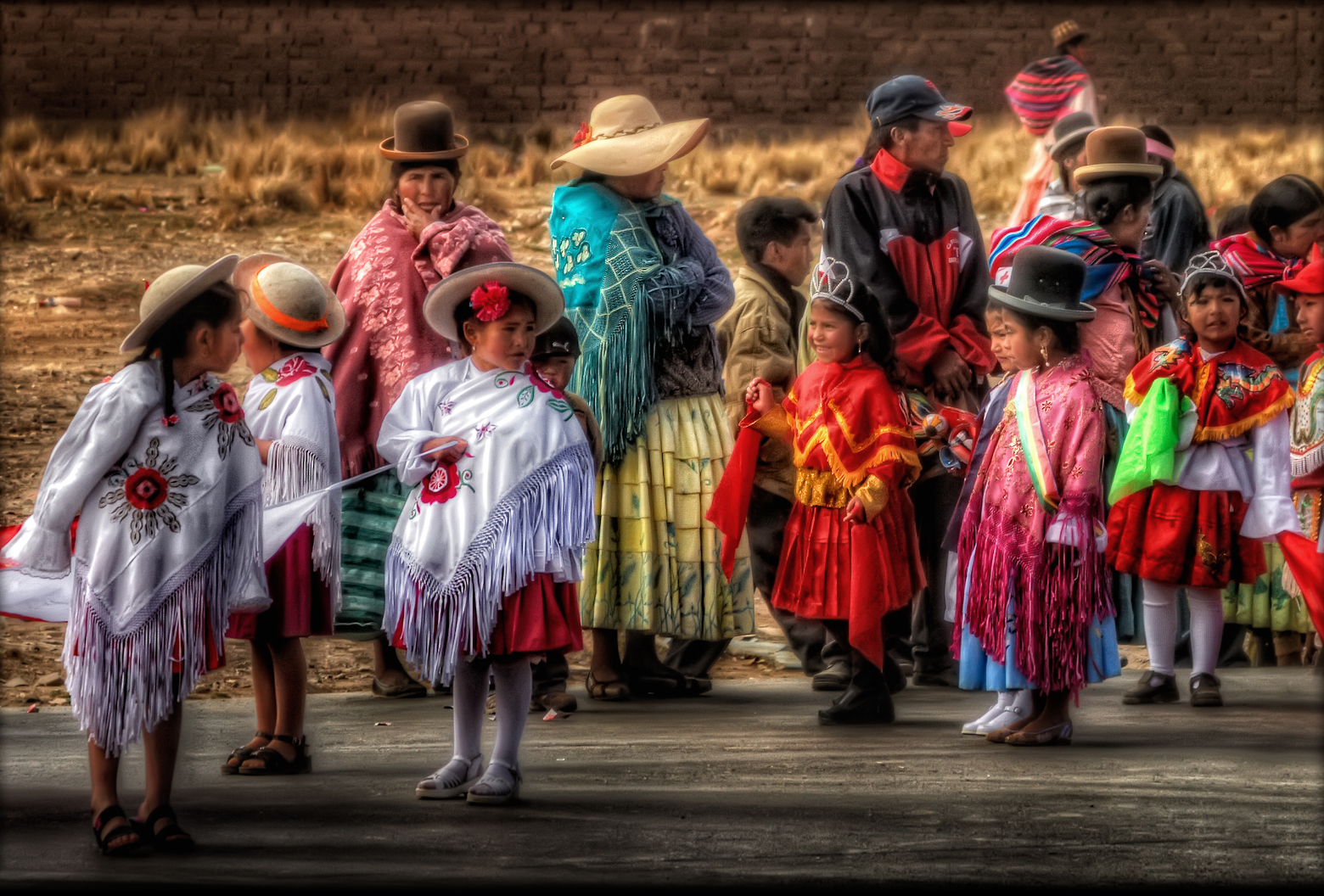
The parade in El Alto celebrates the "Day of the Sea" (Dia del Mar) when Bolivians remember the loss of their coastline to Chile. Bolivia and Paraguay are the only landlocked countries in South America.

Día del Mar (Day of the Sea) is an annual celebration in Bolivia that observes the loss of Litoral Department during the 1879–1883 War of the Pacific with Chile. The day is celebrated on 23 March (Battle of Topáter), at the conclusion of the week-long Semana del Mar, with a ceremony at La Paz's Plaza Abaroa in honor of the war hero Eduardo Abaroa and in parallel ceremonies nationwide. Bolivia considers the Día del Mar an opportunity to reiterate its claims for access to the Pacific Ocean that was lost when the country became landlocked following the war. The 1963 iteration of the event was marked by chants and songs against Chile by worker and student groups.

== See also ==
- Bolivia Mar
- Battle of Topáter
