= Plaza Abaroa =

Plaza located in Sopocachi in the city of La Paz, Bolivia

Coordinates: 16°30′38″S 68°7′36″W

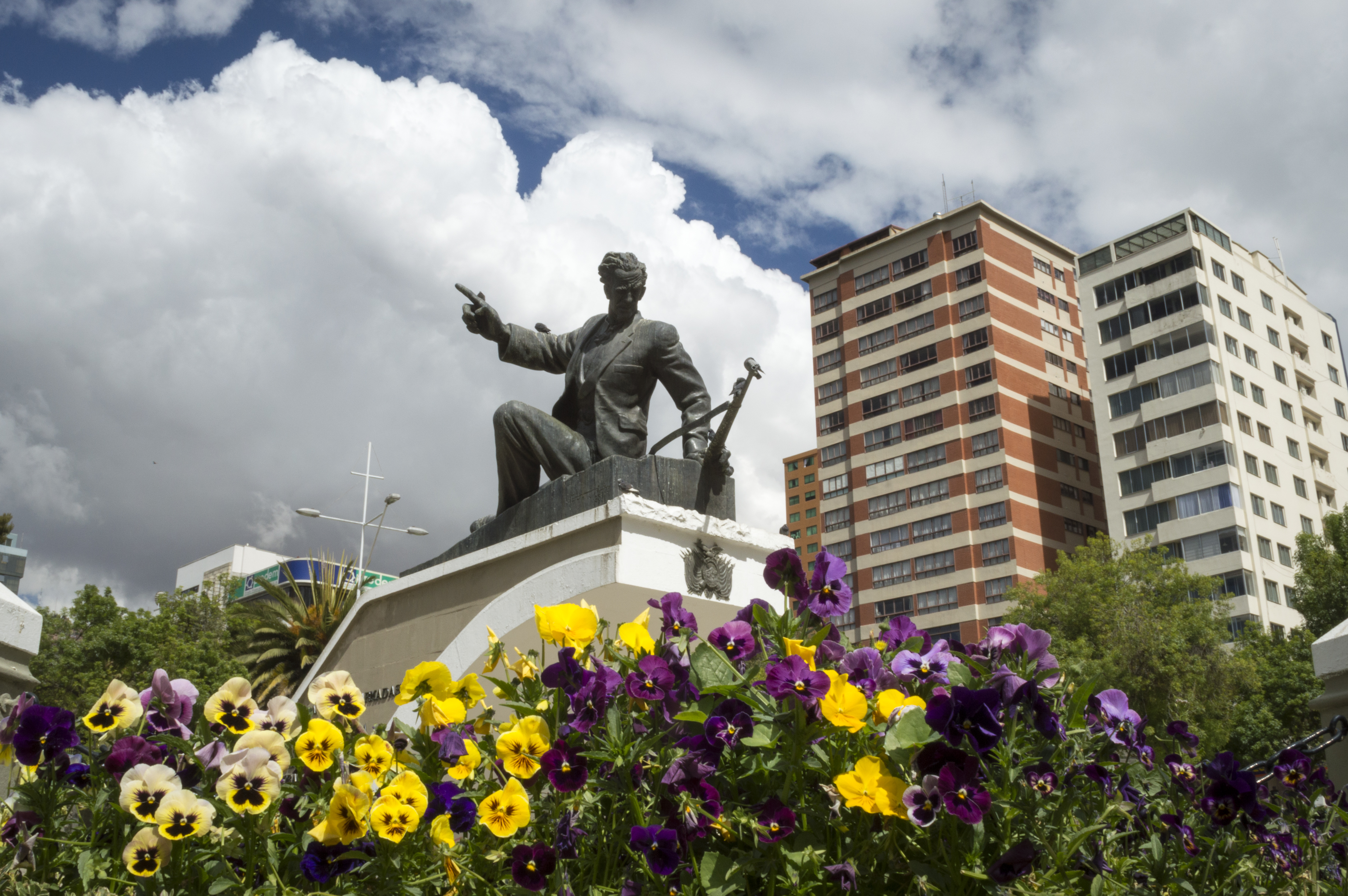
- Monument to Eduardo Abaroa

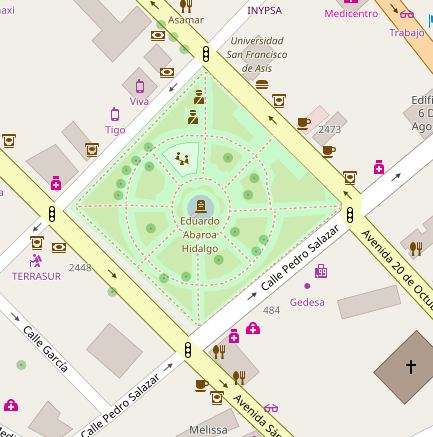
- Map of the Plaza in 2017
- Administrator: Gobierno Autónomo Municipal de La Paz

Plaza Abaroa (Abaroa Square) is a public space, named in honor of Eduardo Abaroa the Bolivian hero who fought in the War of the Pacific. It is located in the city of La Paz, Bolivia, in the Sopocachi area, among 20 de Octubre, Sánchez Lima, Pedro Salazar & Belisario Salinas streets.

== Characteristics ==
The plaza has a rectangular shape, and has eight radial pedestrian accesses that flow into a central fountain in the center of which is a memorial of Eduardo Abaroa on a pedestal with the shape of an incomplete bridge. The bronze sculpture representing the hero in a challenging position was made by the sculptor Emiliano Lujan Sandoval.

== History ==
The square was repaired in 1927 by the prefect Hugo Ernest. In its center is a memorial to Eduardo Abaroa, hero of the War of the Pacific. He defended Calama along with 144 civilians, then Bolivian territory, before the Chilean invasion.

In this square, every 23 March, official ceremonies are held in memory of Día del Mar (Day of the Sea) and the loss of the Litoral Department.
