= Marie Panayotopoulos-Cassiotou =

Greek politician

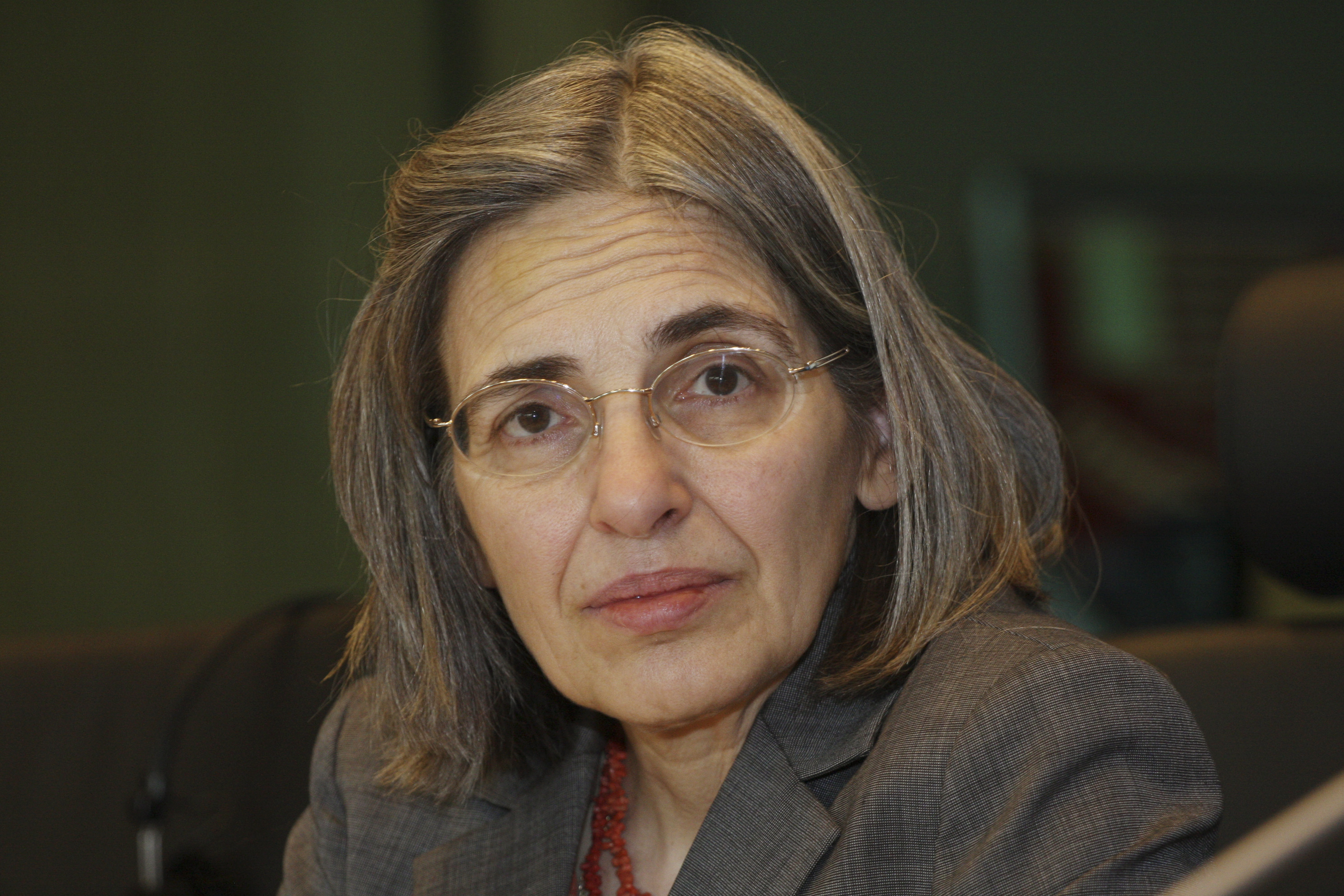
Portrait of MEP Marie PANAYATOPOULOS-CASSIOTOU

Marie Panayotopoulos-Cassiotou (born 29 July 1952 in Chios) is a Greek politician and was a Member of the European Parliament (MEP) with the New Democracy from 2004 to 2009, (part of the European People's Party). As a member of the European Parliament Mrs Panayotopoulos was vice-chair of the European Parliament's Committee on Petitions. She had a seat in its Committee on Employment and Social Affairs, its Committee on Women's Rights and Gender Equality and had a substitute seat for the Committee on Legal Affairs.

In 2008 she won the Parliament Magazine MEP Award in the category of Employment and Social Affairs.

== Education ==
- 1974: Graduate in Greek and French literature (Athens)
- 1976: Graduate in Byzantine and modern Greek literature (Athens)
- 1977: diplôme d'études approfondies (DEA - University of Paris I: Panthéon-Sorbonne)
- 1982: Doctorate in History (Paris I, Panthéon-Sorbonne 1982), Diploma in History and Byzantine Culture (Bari)
- 1983: Specialist in Education and Vocational Guidance (Lyon II)

== Career ==
- 1975: Assistant French teacher
- 1980-1990 Language teacher in lower and upper secondary schools in Greece (1984-1990 in Germany)
- 1990-1996: Educational and vocational guidance counsellor Germany
- 1993-1994: Deputy educational coordinator for Western Europe (Greece)
- Teacher of modern Greek language and literature and Byzantine literature at the University of Bonn
- 1996-1997: Lexicographic research (Bonn, Germany)
- 1996-2003: Involved in compilation of Byzantine-Greek dictionary

=== Political ===
- Member of Stuttgart (1984-1990) and Bonn (1990-2004) New Democracy Movement
- 1998-2004: Representative of the Greek Confederation of Large Families in COFACE

== Decorations ==
- 1994: Order of Merit of the Federal Republic of Germany
- 2008: The Parliament Magazine MEP Award in the category of Employment and Social Affairs

== See also ==
- 2004 European Parliament election in Greece
