= Xavier Waterkeyn =

Australian writer & literary agent (born 1965)

- Born: 29 July 1965 (age 61); Buenos Aires, Argentina
- Occupation: Author
- Relatives: André Waterkeyn (engineer); Tristan Waterkeyn (musician); Sarah Waterkeyn (floral designer and author)
- Writing career
- Genres: Non-fiction, fiction
- Notable works: Where's Bin Laden; The Gabriel Method
- Website: thebuddingchefblog.com

Xavier Waterkeyn (born 29 July 1965 in Argentina) is an Australian non-fiction and fiction writer and literary agent. He is the author of twenty-three books.

== Biography ==
Waterkeyn was born in Argentina in 1965, of a Belgian father and Argentinean mother. His family moved to Sydney when he was three. He has worked in photography, film directing, acting, scriptwriting, editing and marketing. He has written a variety of books in both non-fiction and fiction genres. Waterkeyn is the co-founder of the Flying Pigs literary agency.

== Work ==
Waterkeyn's most commercially successful fiction works to date have been his Where's …? collaborations with Australian illustrator Daniel Lalic, in particular Where's Bin Laden in its various editions and incarnations, which provoked controversy and was removed from department store shelves following protests.

Waterkeyn's most notable non-fiction work to date has been his editing and manuscript development work on The Gabriel Method, which has sold over 200,000 copies.

== Books ==
=== Fiction ===
- Where's Bin Laden: The Final Chapter (illustrated by Daniel Lalic) (2011)
- Where's Michael? (2010)
- Where's Bin Laden? 3D Edition (2009)
- Where's Elvis? (2009)
- Where's Bin Laden? CIA Undercover Edition (2007)
- Where's Bin Laden? (2006)

=== Puzzles ===
- Where's Bin Laden in Sydney? (2009)
- Where's Bin Laden in California? (2009)
- Where's Bin Laden in London? (2009)

=== Non-fiction ===
- Air Disasters of the World (2013)
- Grand Visions (2010)
- Superstitions (2008)
- Air & Space Disasters of the World (2007)
- Celebrity Crimes (2007)
- Assassination (2007)
- Brilliant Ideas (2006)
- Death Row (2006)
- Who's Rejecting Who? (2006)
- Women In Crime (2005)

=== Non-fiction under pseudonyms ===
- Great Funny One-Liners (2008)
- Great Insults and Comebacks (2008)

=== Credited as editor ===
- The Fit Kids Revolution (2014)
- The Gabriel Method Cook Book (2011)
- The Gabriel Method (2009)
