= Eduardo Abaroa =

Bolivian war hero (1838–1879)

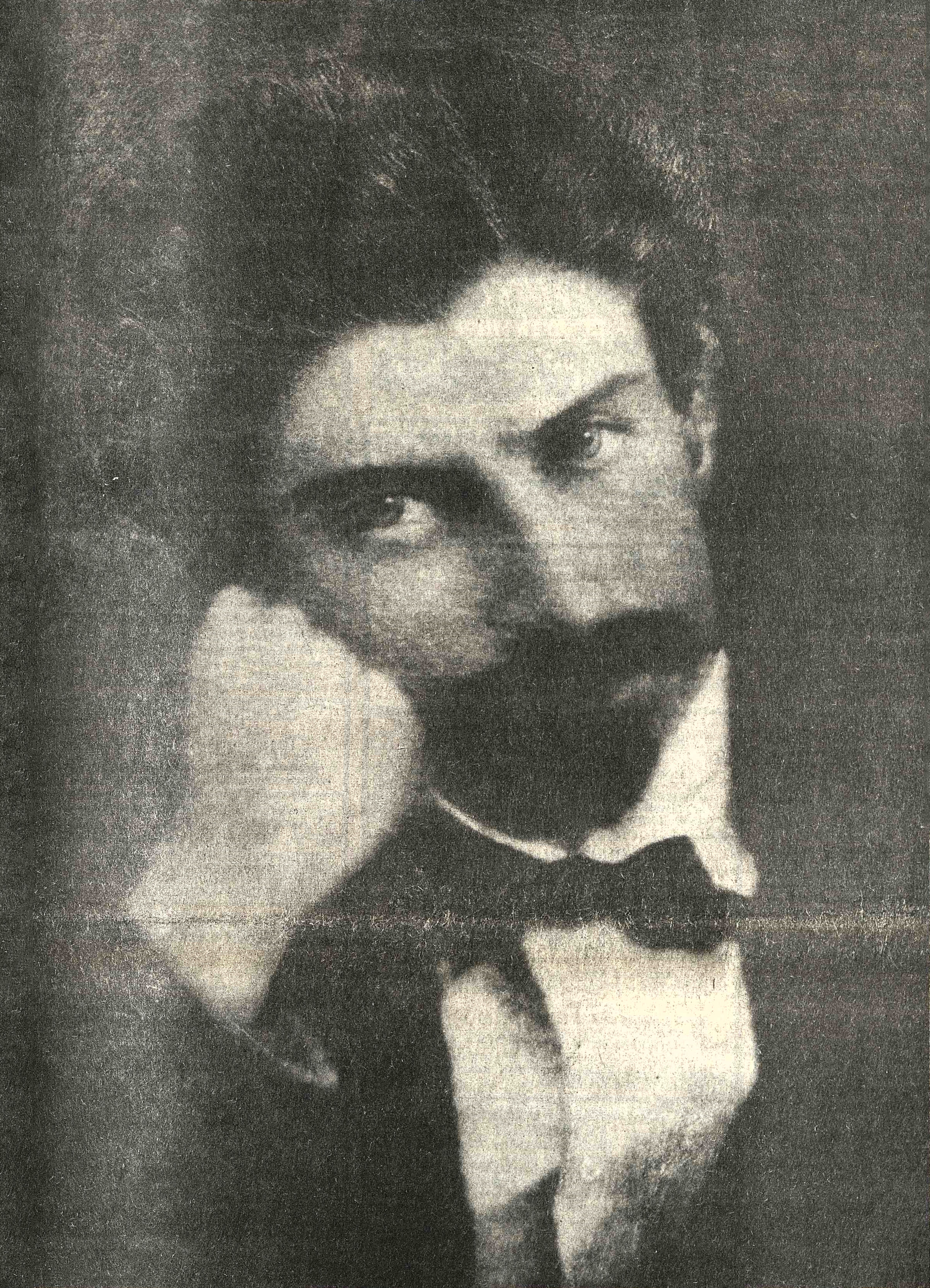
- Born: 13 October 1838; San Pedro de Atacama, Bolivia (now San Pedro de Atacama, Chile)
- Died: 23 March 1879 (aged 40); Calama, Bolivia
- Occupation: Engineer
- Known for: participation in War of the Pacific

Eduardo Abaroa Hidalgo (13 October 1838 – 23 March 1879) was Bolivia's foremost hero of the War of the Pacific (1879–1883), which pitted Chile against Bolivia and Peru. He was one of the leaders of the civilian resistance to the Chilean invasion at the Battle of Topáter.

Abaroa was an engineer by trade, working in a silver mine located in the coastal region of Litoral, which Chile took from Bolivia during the War of the Pacific. During the Battle of Topáter (23 March 1879), the first armed clash of the war, Colonel Abaroa was part of a badly outnumbered Bolivian force defending a bridge that crossed the Topáter River and gave access to the city of Calama, an important desert oasis on the road to Bolivia. Refusing to surrender, after the outnumbered Bolivian military forces withdrew, he fought to his last breath, a feat that later transformed him into a revered national hero.

When, injured and surrounded, he was asked to surrender by the Chilean forces, he provided an answer that has gone into Bolivian folklore: "¿Rendirme yo? ¡Que se rinda su abuela, carajo!" ("Surrender? Your grandmother [is who] should surrender, you bastard!", or "Surrender, me? Let your grandmother surrender, dammit!", or, more literally, "Surrender, me? That your grandmother surrender herself, fuck!"), equivalent to saying "Surrender? Surrender my ass!". According to Chilean folklore, he answered: "¿Quién, yo?" ("Who, me?")

== Legacy and critical discussion ==
In 1952, on the 73rd anniversary of his death, the Bolivian Government repatriated Abaroa's body, burying it with full honors and in the midst of an impressive crowd (numbering in the tens of thousands) in the popular La Paz square that bears the hero's name. Plaza Abaroa (Abaroa Square) also contains a large bronze statue of the Bolivian martyr, presented in full pose and defiance, as he would have looked the moment before his death. His country honored him with a series of stamps (Scott#365-370 and C157-162). The stamps quoted his last words, eliding "carajo" with an ellipsis.

Eduardo Abaroa Province is named in his honor, as is Eduardo Avaroa Andean Fauna National Reserve. The anniversary of Abaroa's heroic death (March 23) is the national holiday in Bolivia Día del Mar, or the Day of the Sea.

His granddaughter, Elena Abaroa Córdova, married Croatian immigrant in Chile Policarpo Lukšić, with whom she had businessman Andrónico Luksic Abaroa, father of Andrónico Luksic Craig and founder of the Luksic family, one of the richest families in the world.
