= Battle of Topáter =

First battle of the War of the Pacific, on 23 March 1879

- Part of the War of the Pacific
- Eduardo Abaroa and the defenders of Topáter
Date	23 March 1879
Location	Calama, Bolivia 22°27′54″S 68°54′18″W
Result	Chilean victory

Belligerents
Chile	Bolivia

Commanders and leaders
(Chile) Eleuterio Ramírez	(Bolivia) José Santos (POW) (Bolivia) Ladislao Cabrera (Bolivia) Eduardo Abaroa †

Strength
554 soldiers	135 militia and soldiers

Casualties and losses
7 killed 6 wounded	20 killed 3 wounded 24 captured
- Location within Chile Battle of Topáter (South America) Battle of Topáter (America)

The Battle of Topáter, or Battle of Calama, was fought on March 23, 1879, between Chile and Bolivia. It was the first battle of the War of the Pacific.

The Chileans were taking possession of the Antofagasta (Litoral) Province, then a part of Bolivia. The few Bolivian troops decided to make a stand in the town of Calama. On their way to occupy Calama, 554 Chilean troops, including cavalry and with two Krupp rifled guns, were opposed by 135 Bolivian soldiers and civilian residents led by Dr. Ladislao Cabrera, a civilian and a political authority in the region.

The Bolivians fought next to the Topáter ford, which runs outside the city. Cabrera dug in at two destroyed bridges; calls to surrender were rejected before and during the battle. Outnumbered and low in ammunition, most of the Bolivian force eventually withdrew except for a small group of civilians, led by Colonel Eduardo Abaroa, that fought to the end.

The Bolivian national hero, Abaroa, died in the battle. Further ground battles would not take place until the war at sea had been completed.

== See also ==
- Día del Mar
