= Andrea Musacco =

Italian footballer (born 1982)

Personal information
- Date of birth: 23 March 1982 (age 44)
- Place of birth: Cosenza, Italy
- Height: 1.75 m (5 ft 9 in)
- Positions: Midfielder; defender

Youth career
- Cosenza

Senior career*
Years	Team	Apps	(Gls)
2000–2002	Cosenza	3	(1)
2001–2002	→ Thiene (loan)	11	(0)
2002–2003	Roma	0	(0)
2002–2003	→ Frosinone (loan)	27	(4)
2003–2004	Grosseto	4	(0)
2004	→ Ivrea (loan)	4	(0)
2004–2006	Andria	55	(3)
2006–2008	Manfredonia	11	(0)
2007	→ Paganese (loan)	11	(0)
2008	Scafatese	12	(0)
2008–2009	Cosenza	27	(0)
2009–2010	Nocerina	14	(0)
- * Club domestic league appearances and goals as of 07:52, 10 April 2010 (UTC)

Andrea Musacco (born 23 March 1982) is an Italian footballer.

== Biography ==
=== Early career ===
Musacco started his career at hometown club Cosenza. In 2001–02 season, he joined Thiene of Serie C2 on loan.

=== Roma and doping administration ===
On 28 June 2002, two days before the closure of the 2001–02 fiscal year, he was joined Roma for €2.5 million, in the same time Manuel Parla joined €2.4 million. That week, Roma also swap backup players and even youth players with other teams with inflated price, and gained a "profit" of €55 million. Musacco was named one of the victim of doping administration by the media, which Roma suspected to use cross-trading (exchange player with same price and contract length) and inflated the price to increase the profit of selling player. In although they did not received real money of selling player (but intangible asset of new player's contract), the acquire cost was to amortised proportionality during the player contract (usually multi-year), overall it still appeared a profit in the first-year fiscal report, although most of the nominal value of the registration rights of new signings were far higher than the fair value. Thus like took drug to enhance the economic situation.

That led to an investigation by prosecutor of Rome for a suspected false accounting in 2004. But Roma was fined €60,000 on 30 October 2007 by Criminal Court of Rome for irregularity on youth player's transfer only, as cross trading and inflating the price itself is not illegal, prosecutor failed to prove the purpose behind is illegal against the clubs.

=== Lega Pro clubs ===
That season Musacco was immediately loaned to Serie C2 side Frosinone. In 2003–04 season, he joined Grosseto in co-ownership deal for a peppercorn fee of €500., which in June 2004 Roma gave up the remain 50% rights.

Despite Musacco already left the club, Roma had set up a special amortise fund to amortise the toxic player asset in 10-year period since 2002–03 season. The special law was allowed the club to amortise to transfer fee regardless the players was still in the squad or not, which Musacco value was split into €720,000 to amortise normally according to the length of the contract, and €1.78 million to the special fund. The fund which still had an asset "value" of nearly €80 million on 30 June 2006, was removed in the start of 2006–07 financial year, which also made the net equity decreased €80 million immediately. On 30 June 2006 Musacco still represent €1.068 million asset "value" on Roma balance.

In June 2006, he joined Manfredonia. In December 2006 for Paganese. In January 2008 for Scafatese.

In July 2008, Musacco returned to Cosenza. In October 2009 for Nocerina.
