= Marie Adam-Doerrer =

Swiss women's rights activist and unionist

Marie Adam-Doerrer (23 March 1838 – 29 July 1908) was a Swiss women's rights activist and unionist.

Born in Germany as Marie Doerrer, she trained as a goldsmith and worked in Bern as a washerwoman, marrying the shoemaker Karl Adam. She joined the Social Democratic Party of Switzerland after losing her savings in a bank crash. In 1887, she co-founded the Bernese Women Workers' Association (Arbeiterinnenverein), and in 1902, the Bernese Women Day Laborers' Association (Tagelöhnerinnenverein), which she presided over.

Adam-Doerrer was a co-founder and member of numerous other Swiss women's organizations, and advocated in favor of cooperation between socialist and conservative women's organizations at the 1904 international women's congress.
