= Hangover remedies =

Means by which hangover symptoms are treated

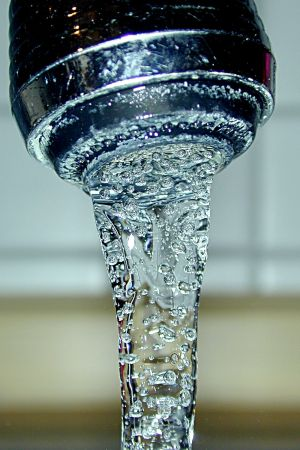
Rehydrating with drinking water before going to bed or during a hangover may relieve dehydration-associated symptoms such as thirst, dizziness, dry mouth, and headache.

Various foods, dishes, and medicines have been described as having a theoretical potential for easing or alleviating symptoms of a hangover.

While recommendations and folk cures for foods and drinks to relieve hangover symptoms abound, hangover foods have not been scientifically proven to function as a remedy or cure for the hangover.

In a review assessing eight randomised controlled trials of propranolol, tropisetron, tolfenamic acid, fructose/glucose, a yeast preparation and supplements containing Borago officinalis, Cynara scolymus and Opuntia ficus-indica, researchers concluded that "no compelling evidence exists to suggest that any conventional or complementary intervention is effective for preventing or treating alcohol hangover."

== List of hangover foods ==
=== Scientific ===
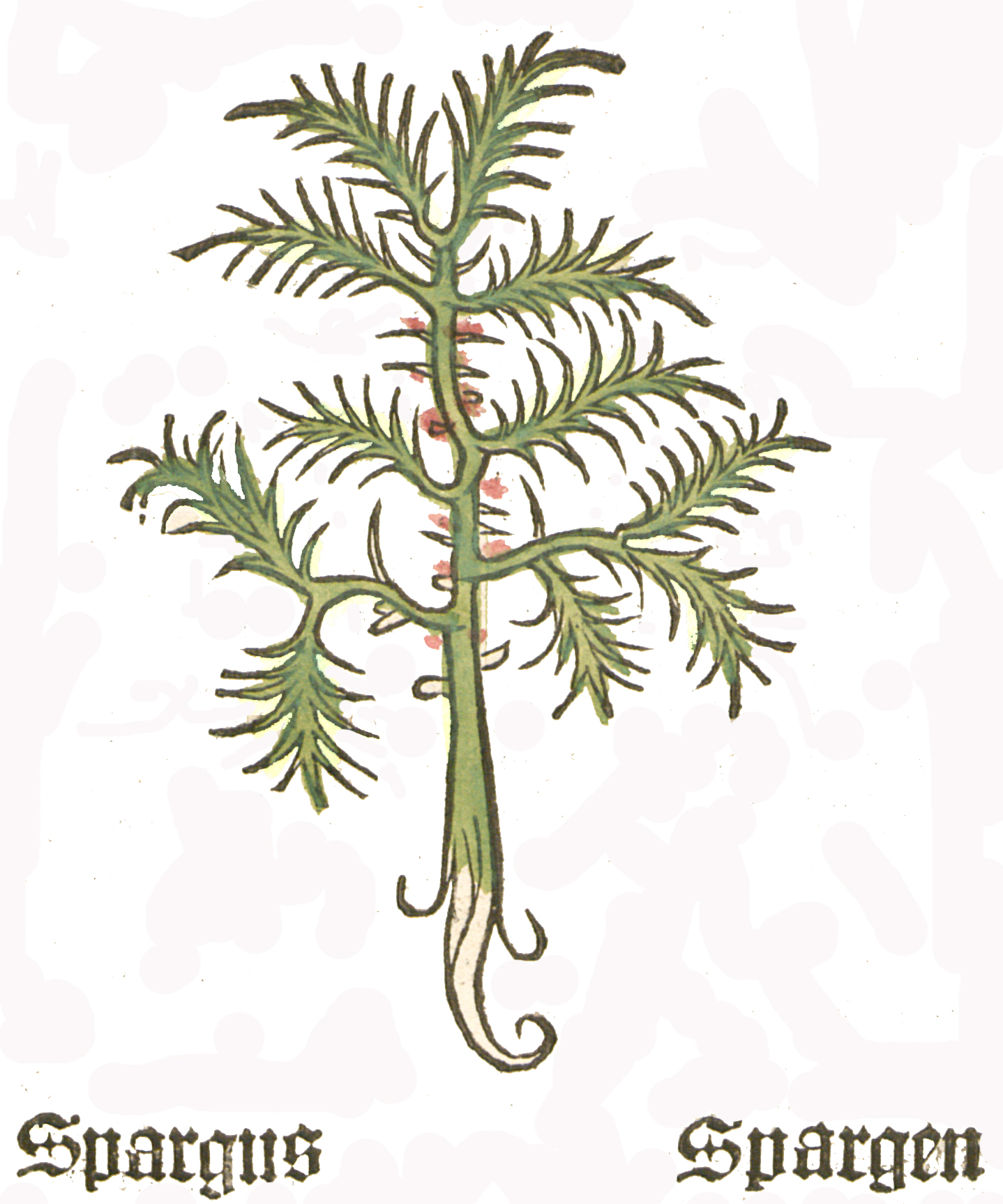
Asparagus leaf extract showed marginal results in a 2012 study.

- Asparagus: In a small cell-based study, concentrated asparagus leaf extract showed marginal harmful by-product scavenging capabilities. This may indicate a physiological effect, but further research is necessary.
- Foods that contain:
  - Cysteine
  - gamma-Linolenic acid
- Drinking water
- Common pear was found to have the highest effect on aldehyde dehydrogenase activity.

=== Folk cures ===
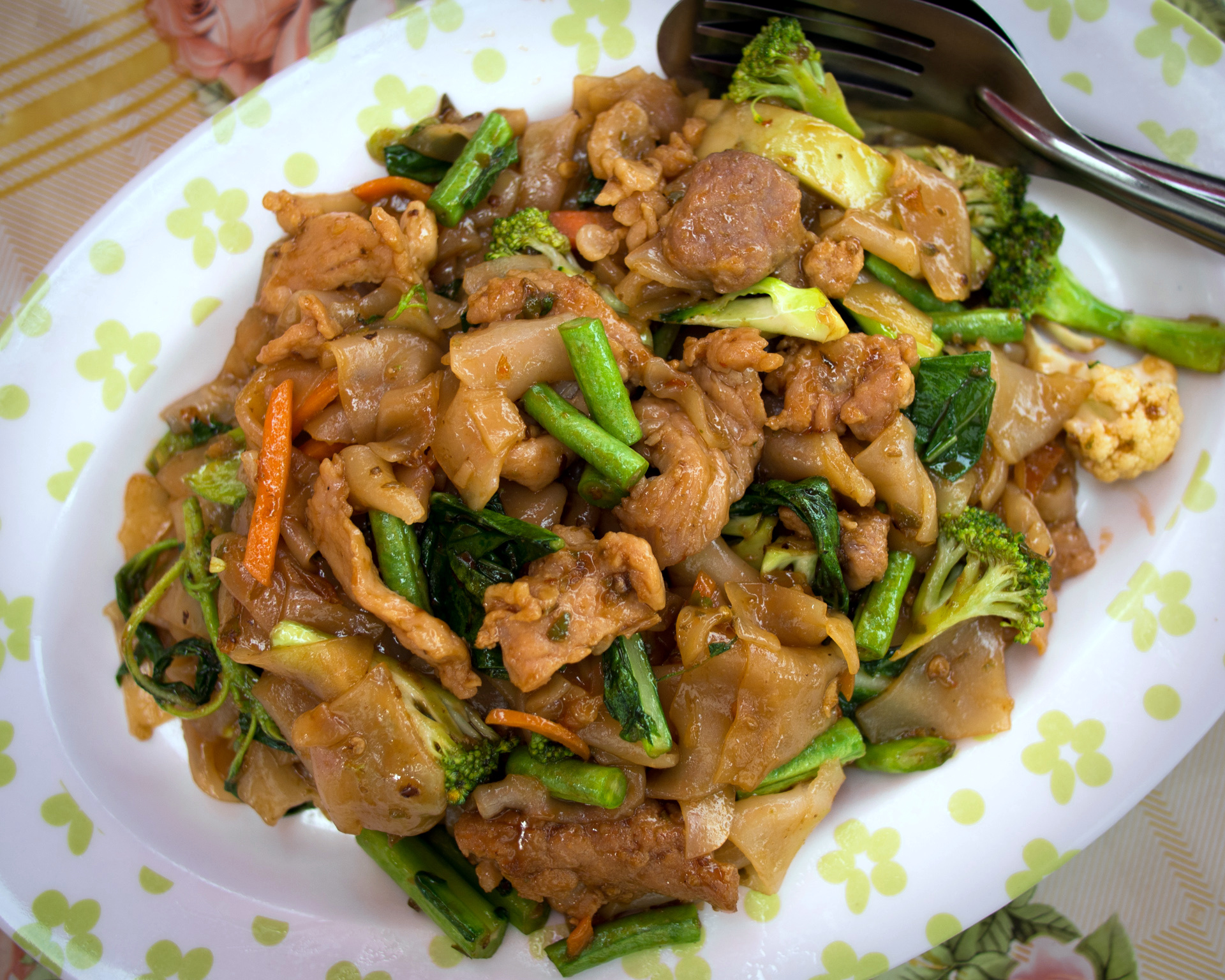
Drunken noodles, Thai food

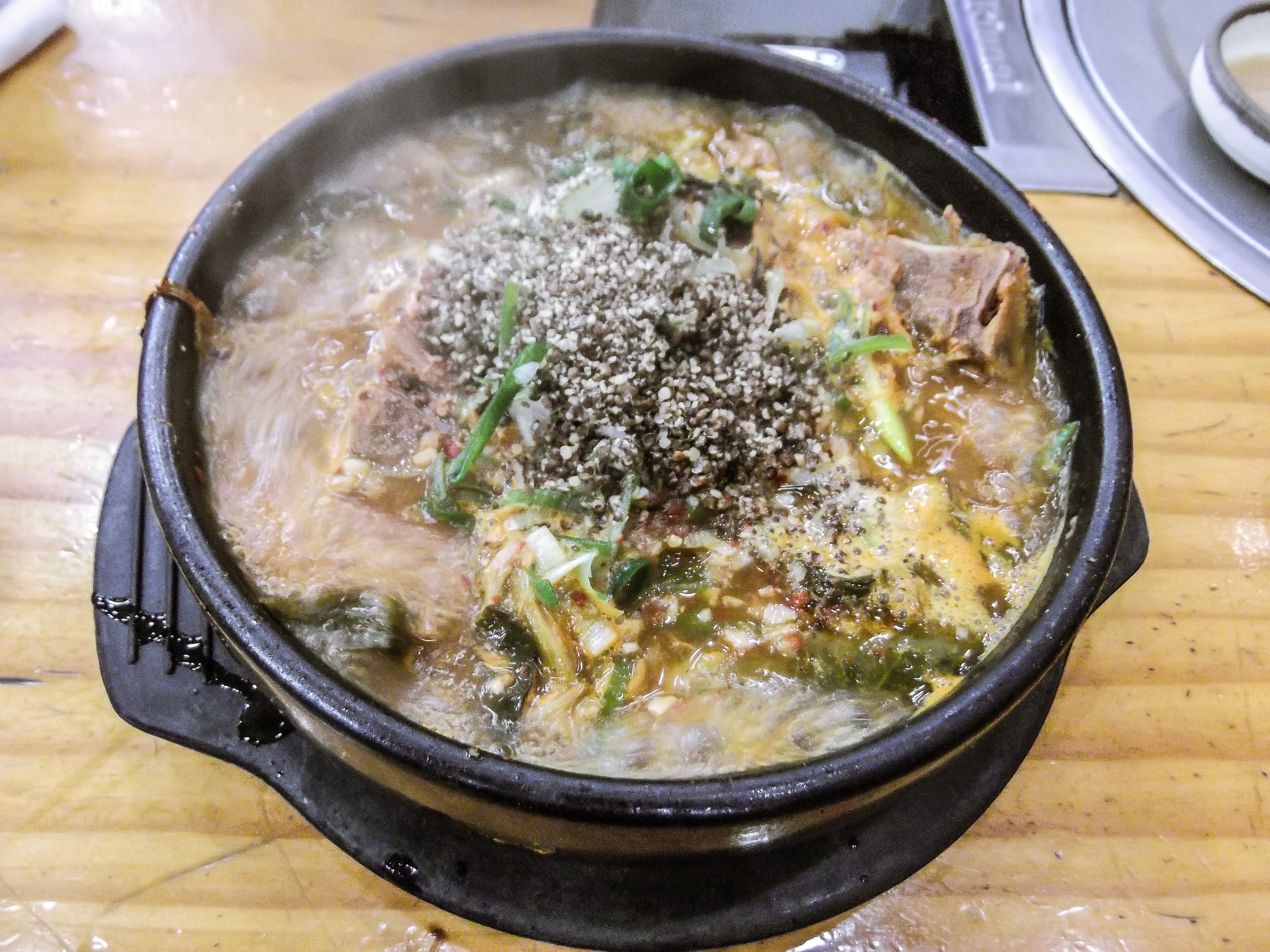
Korean hangover soup

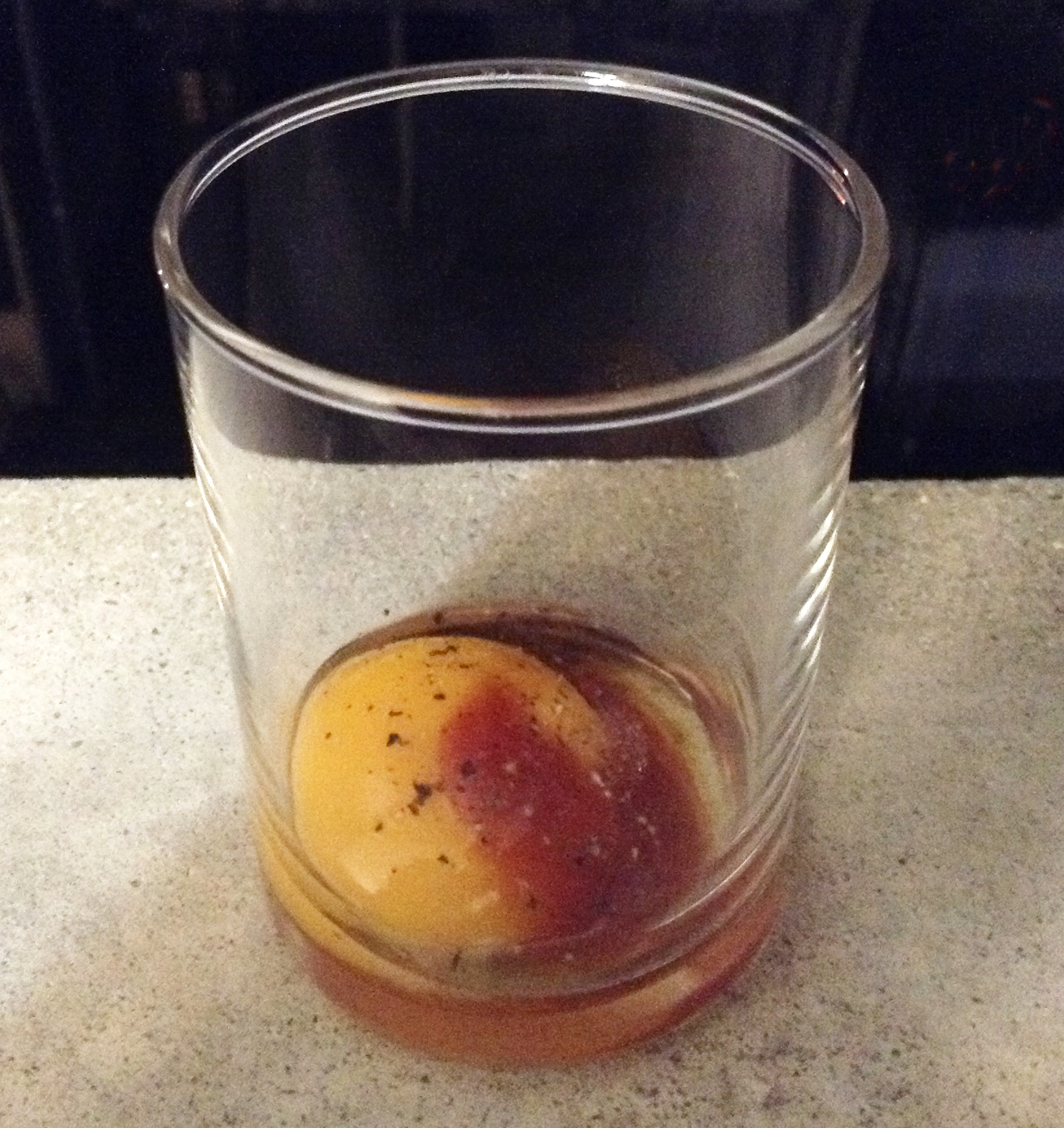
A prairie oyster cocktail

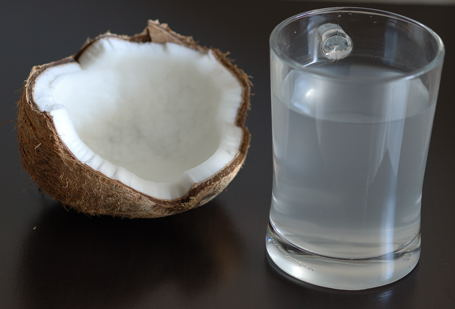
Coconut water

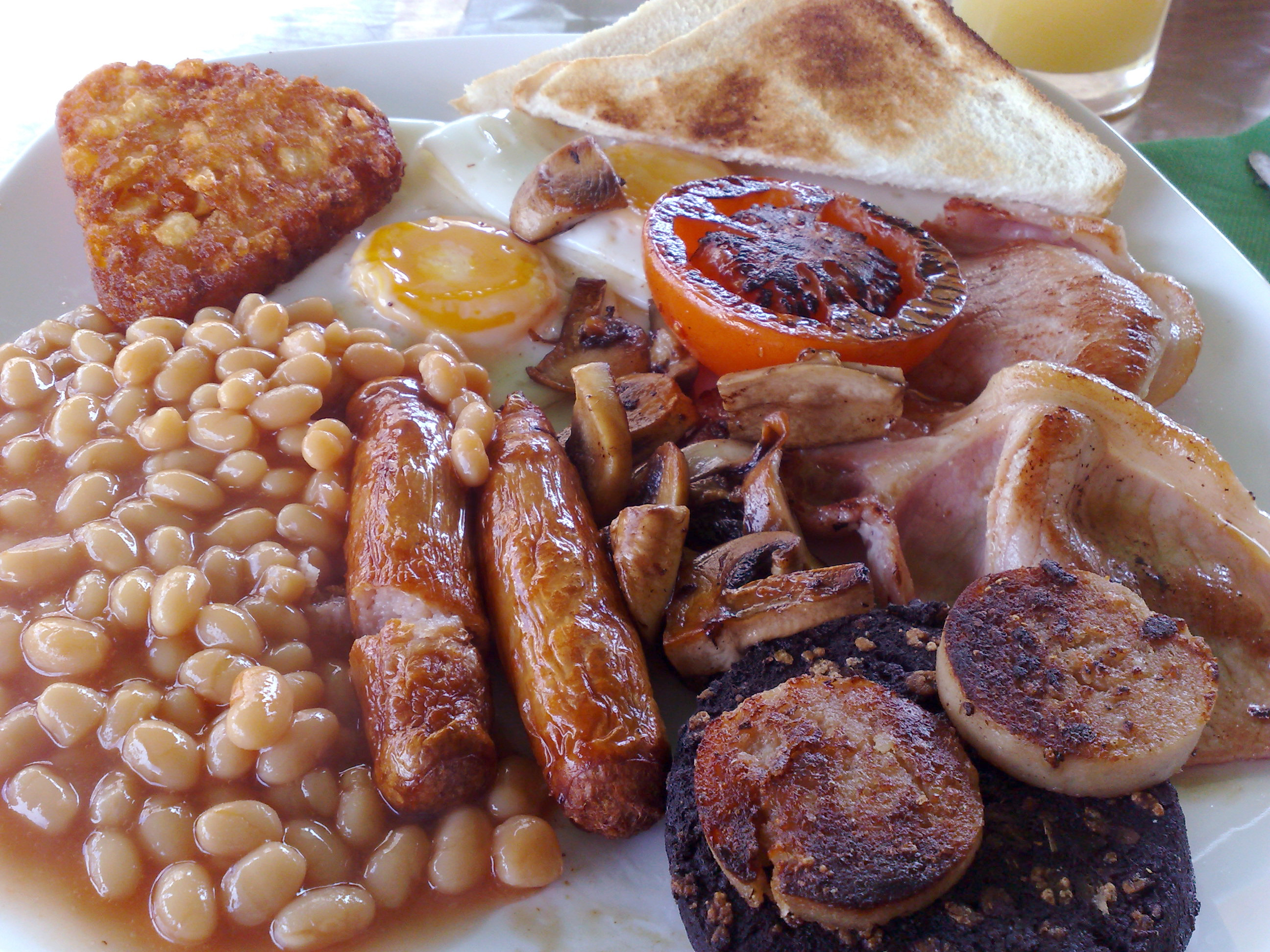
A fry up (full breakfast)

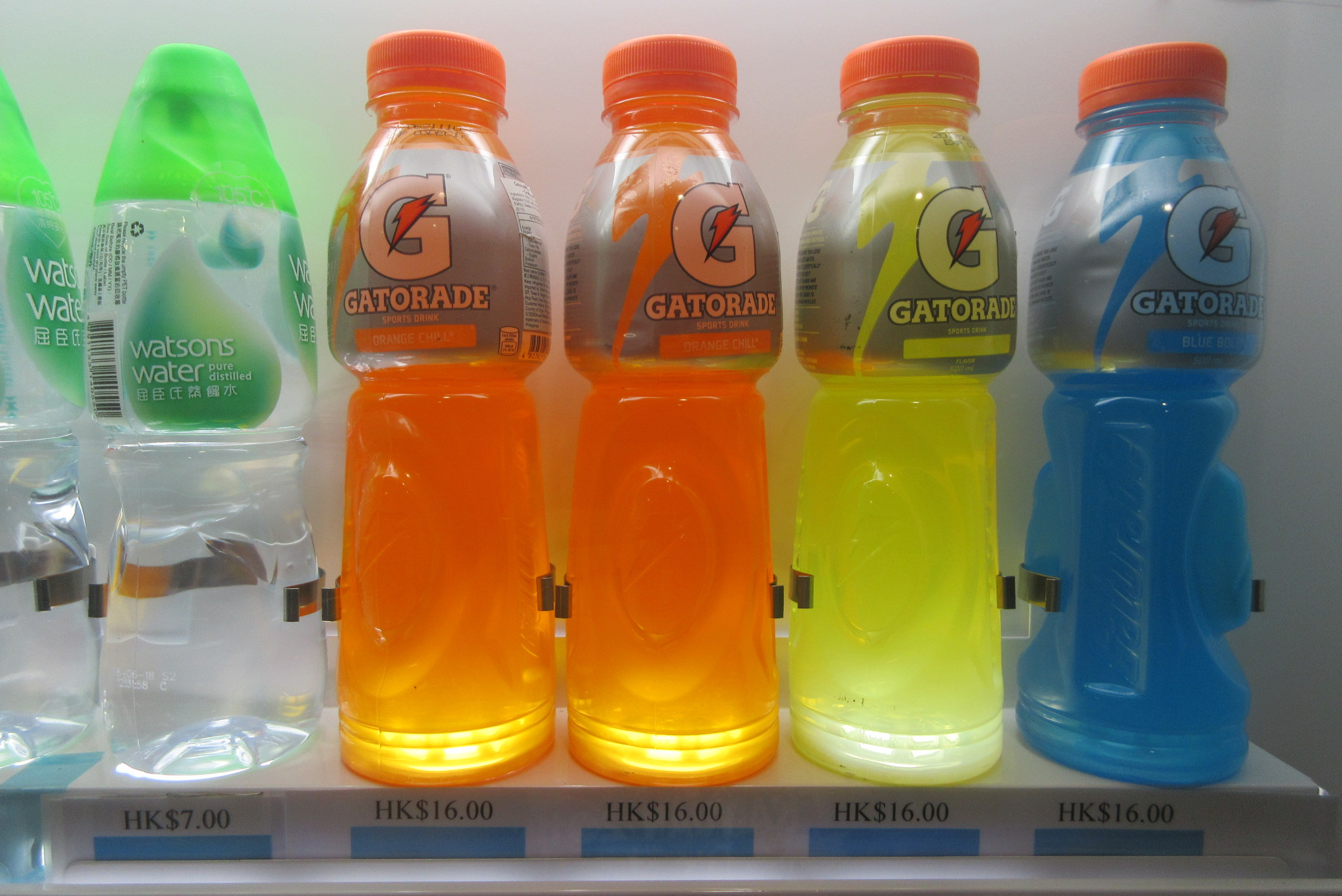
Sports drinks

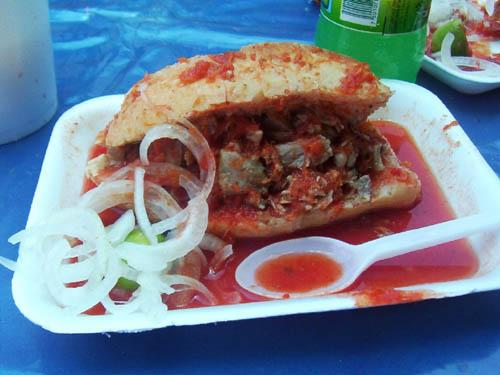
A torta ahogada

The following foods and dishes have been described as potentially easing hangover symptoms. Hangover foods have not been scientifically proven to function as a remedy or cure for the hangover.

- Alcohol – hair of the dog remedy
  - Bloody mary or in Canada, the Caesar.
  - Corpse Reviver
  - Fernet – an alcoholic beverage consumed as a drink choice to avoid the hangover
  - Jägerbomb
  - Underberg – a digestif bitter
  - Vodka
- Water-rich foods:
  - Fruits
    - Banana
    - Kiwifruit
    - Prickly pear fruit
  - Drinks
    - Caffeinated drinks: No significant correlation between caffeine use and hangover severity has been found.
      - Coffee
      - Espresso
    - Electrolyte replacement drinks
      - Pedialyte
      - Sports drinks
    - Juices
      - Fruit juice
      - Pickle juice
      - Tomato juice
    - Teas
      - Ginger tea
      - Green tea
      - Peppermint tea
    - Coconut water
    - Hangover drinks in South Korea – Mass-produced hangover drinks based on Traditional Korean medicine.
  - Vegetables
    - Spinach
    - Tomato
    - Hovenia dulcis
  - Soups
    - Aguadito de pollo – a soup in Peruvian cuisine consisting of chicken, cilantro, vegetables and spices
    - Aguadito – a chunky Peruvian soup made with cilantro, carrot, peas, and potatoes
    - Ajiaco
    - Cesnecka – A soup in Czech cuisine that is prepared using a significant amount of garlic
    - Chicken noodle soup
    - Fricasé – A soup in Bolivian cuisine prepared with ribs, hominy and potatoes
    - Haejang-guk – or hangover soup refers to all kinds of guk or soup eaten as a hangover cure in Korean cuisine. It means "soup to chase a hangover" and is also called sulguk (Korean: 술국).
    - Khash
    - Menudo
    - Miso soup
    - Zurek
    - Tripe soups
- Eggs. Egg dishes:
  - Ostrich egg omelette – consumed as a hangover food in South Africa
  - Fry up – a British full breakfast
  - Loco moco
  - Omelette
  - Prairie oyster – a cocktail served as a hangover remedy that consists of raw egg, Worcestershire sauce, tomato juice, vinegar, hot sauce, salt, and ground black pepper.
  - Ramen
  - Shakshuka
- Greasy foods
  - Bacon sandwich
  - Chicken fillet roll
  - Hamburger
  - Peanut butter
  - Pizza
  - Fried foods
    - Churros
    - Fried chicken
    - Grilled cheese sandwich
    - Poutine
    - Chilaquiles
    - Revuelto Gramajo – a breakfast hash dish in Argentine cuisine consisting of potatoes, eggs, cheese, and vegetables.
    - Youtiao
- Staple food
  - Toast, and toast and honey
  - Oats and oatmeal
  - Spaghetti
  - Quinoa
- Cassoulet
- Ceviche
- Congee
- Dal bhat
- Drunken noodles
- Honey
- Kishkiyya – a porridge in Iraqi cuisine from the 10th century that was consumed in Baghdad, it was prepared using ground wheat and meat.
- Luwombo – A dish in Ugandan cuisine consisting of meat, peanuts called luwombo, and vegetables that is steamed in a banana leaf and typically served with a side dish of plantains.
- Mustard
- Sushi
- Guobacai – A snack of strong local flavor in Tianjin cuisine, guobacai is a sort of pancake made of millet and mung bean flour.
- Torta ahogada

== Medicines ==
- N-Acetylcysteine
- Sobrietol
- Tolfenamic acid
- Aspirin
- Caffeine

=== Ineffective ===
- Activated charcoal

== History ==
Various folk medicine remedies exist for hangovers. The ancient Romans, on the authority of Pliny the Elder, favored raw owl's eggs or fried canary as a hangover remedy, while the "prairie oyster" restorative, introduced at the 1878 Paris World Exposition, calls for raw egg yolk mixed with Worcestershire sauce, Tabasco sauce, salt and pepper. By 1938, the Ritz-Carlton Hotel provided a hangover remedy in the form of a mixture of Coca-Cola and milk (Coca-Cola itself having been invented, by some accounts, as a hangover remedy). Alcoholic writer Ernest Hemingway relied on tomato juice and beer.

Other purported hangover cures includes more alcohol, for example cocktails such as Bloody Mary or Black Velvet (consisting of equal parts champagne and stout).

A 1957 survey by an American folklorist found widespread belief in the efficacy of heavy fried foods, tomato juice and sexual activity.

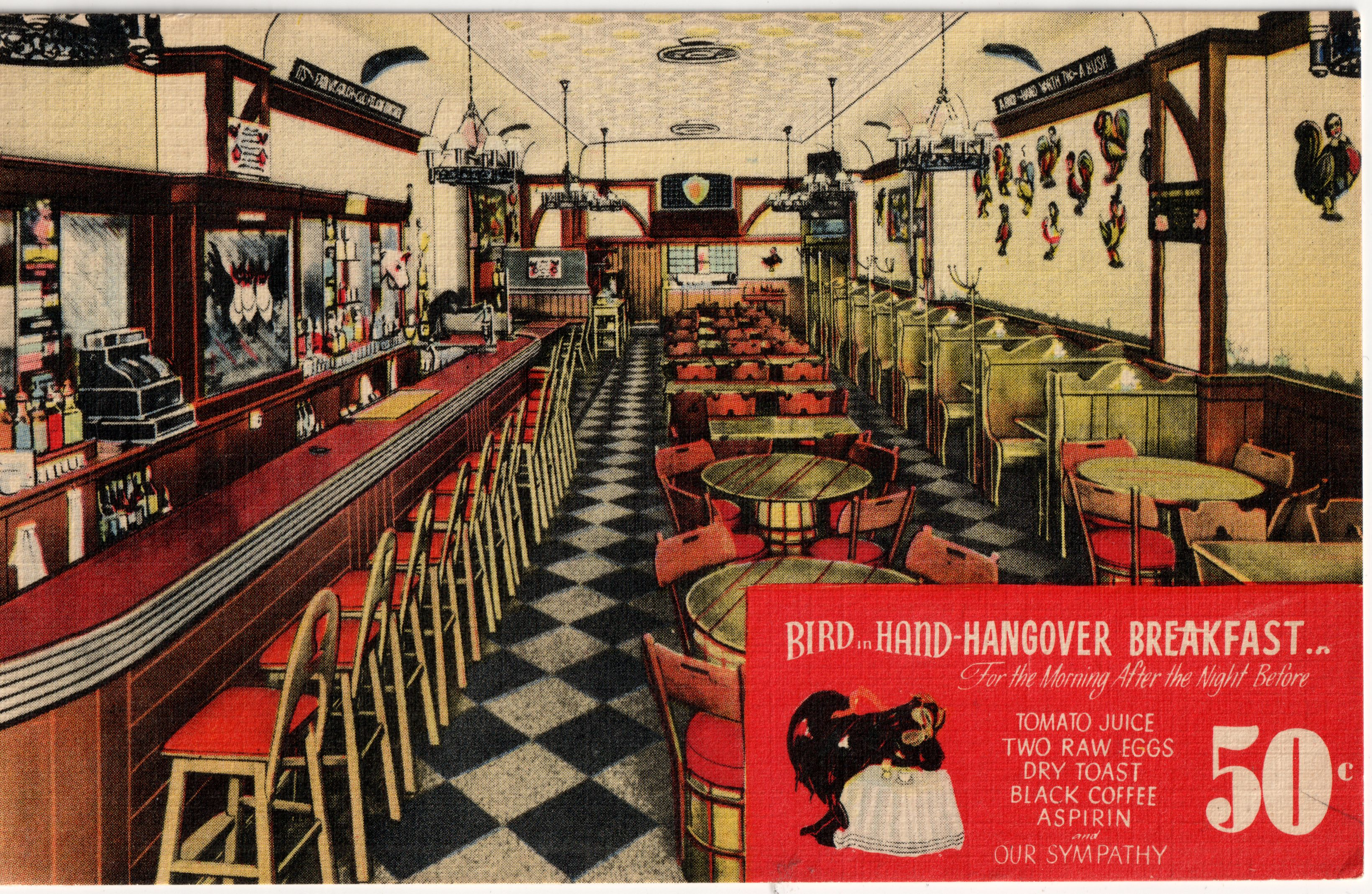
"Hangover breakfast" promoted by a restaurant circa 1950
