= Fricasé =

Bolivian soup dish

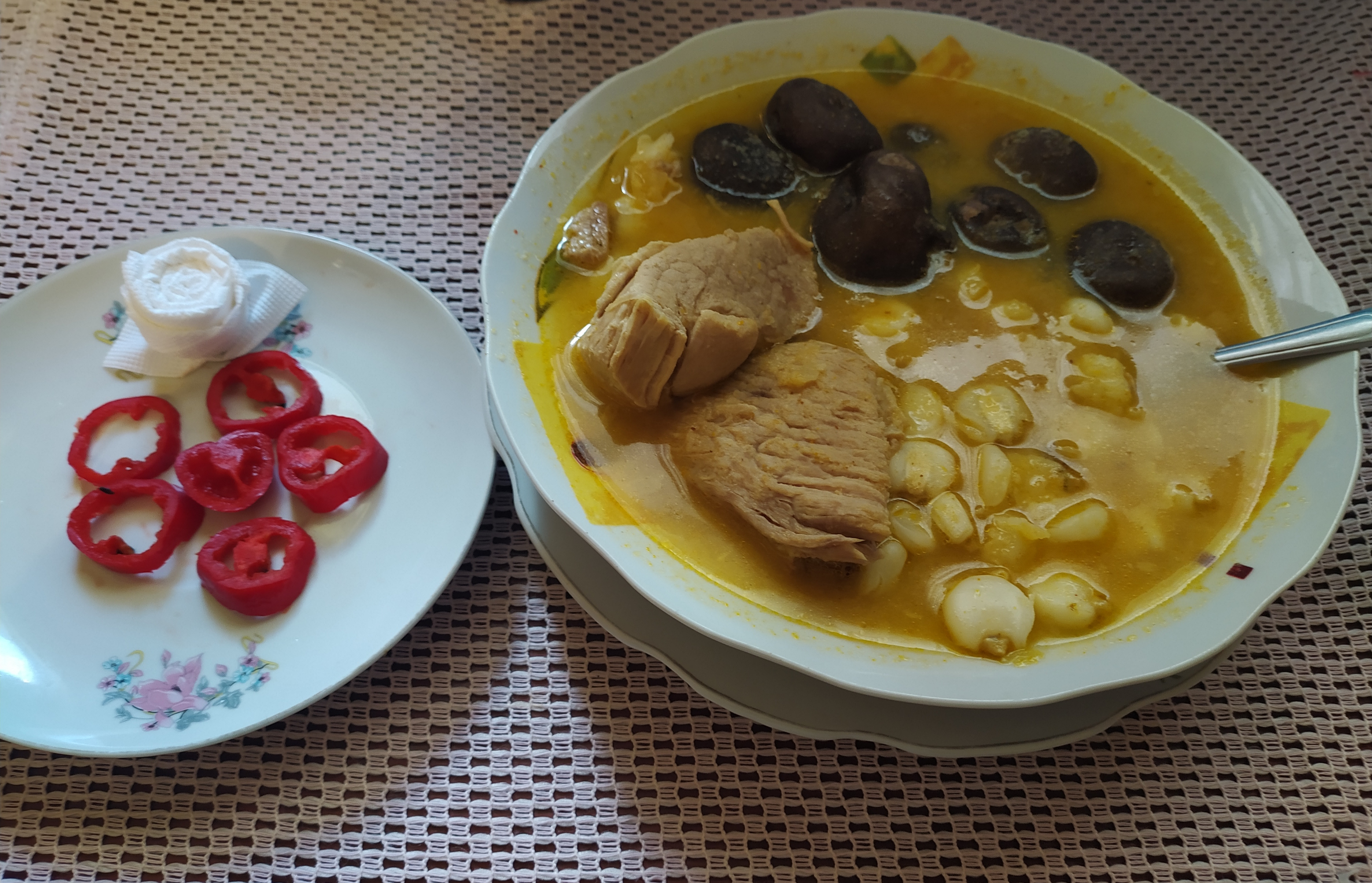
Fricasé de Cerdo

Fricasé is a traditional soup in Bolivian cuisine prepared with pork, pork ribs or chicken, hominy, chuño (a freeze-dried potato product) or potatoes, onion, garlic, salt, pepper and spices. It is sometimes consumed as a hangover food, as having a theoretical potential for easing or alleviating symptoms associated with the hangover.

Fricasé is a common soup in Bolivia, and is often sold and consumed in the morning. It is a spicy soup that is typically prepared using large chunks of meat, and chuno potatoes are typically used in the Altiplano region of Bolivia. The aji pepper is sometimes used as an ingredient, and bread crumbs are sometimes used to thicken the soup.

== See also ==
- List of chicken dishes
- List of pork dishes
- Pozole
