= Trancapecho =

Bolivian sandwich

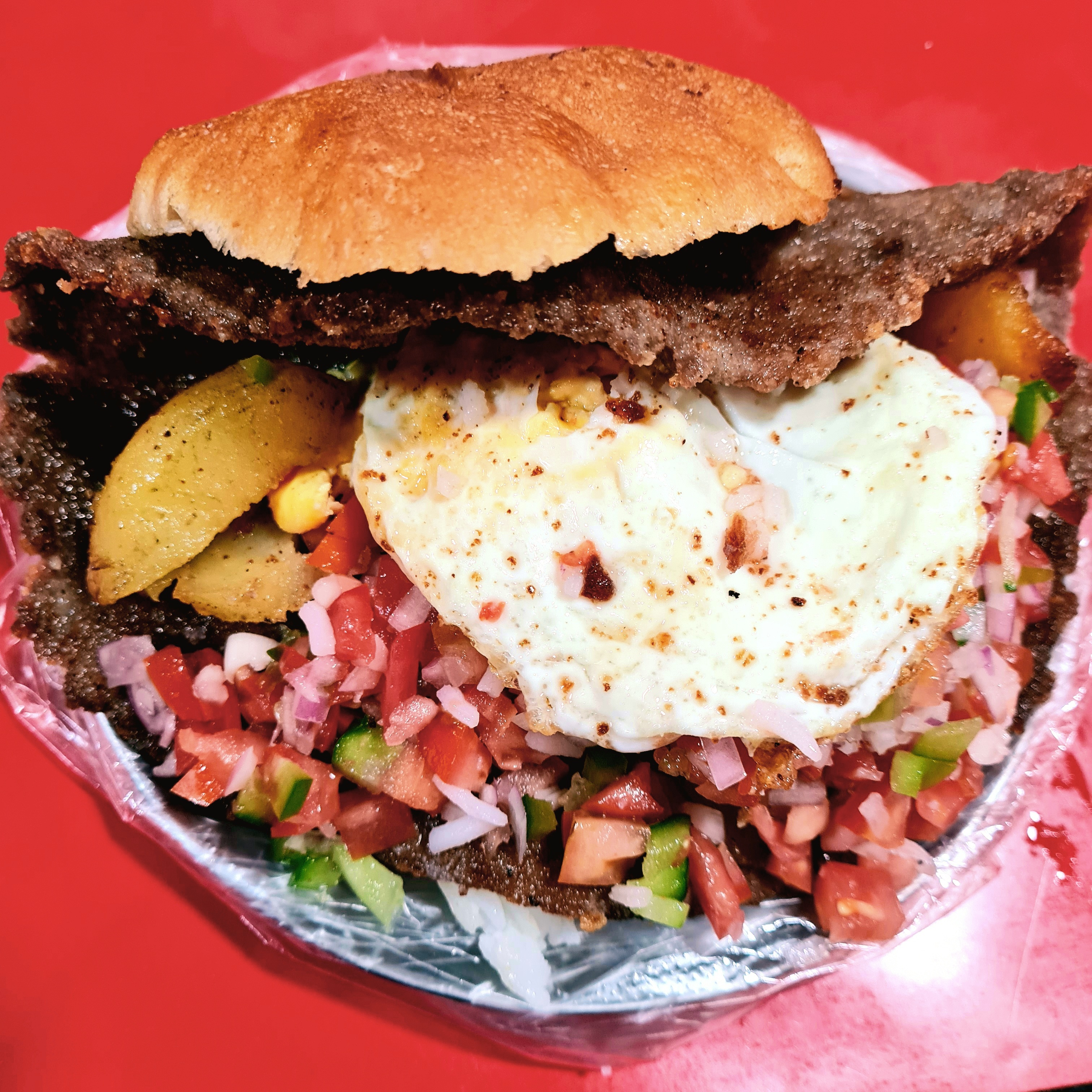
Trancapecho

Trancapecho is a sandwich served in Cochabamba, Bolivia. It comes from a dish called "silpancho", which differs from the traditional silpancho. All ingredients, including the rice, join to a bread tortilla, also the typical preparation in this city. In Cochabamba, this sandwich is found in areas such as markets and areas near San Paul's Catholic University. Ingredients: slice of breaded meat, fried potatoes, a fried egg, rice, and salad (tomatoes, onions, and locotos) between two slices of bread.

== See also ==
- Bolivian cuisine
- List of sandwiches
