= Pozole =

Mexican hominy and meat soup

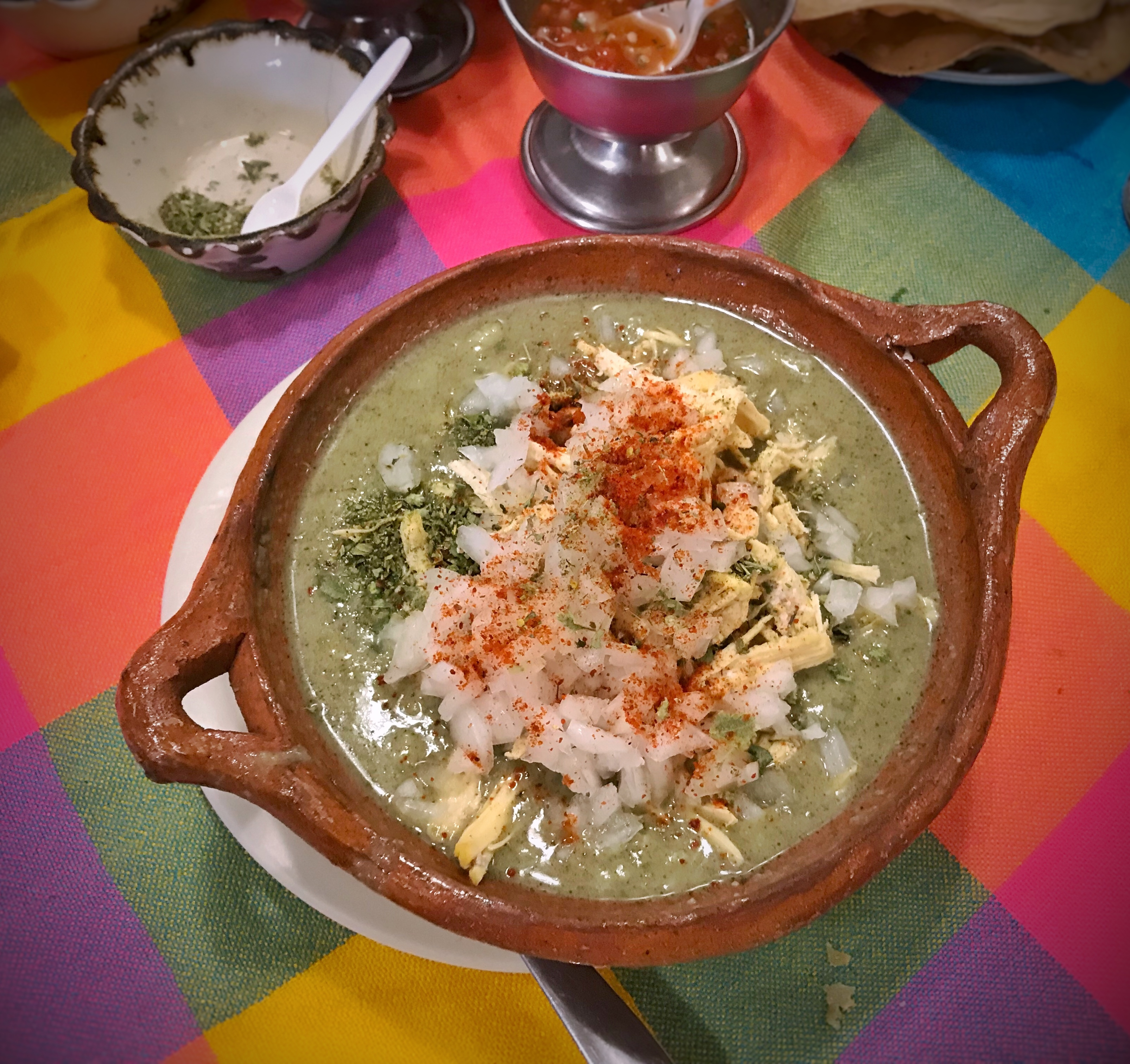
- Pozole verde at a restaurant in Mexico City (2018)
- Type: Soup
- Place of origin: Mexico
- Region or state: Central Mexico
- Created by: Nahuas
- Serving temperature: Hot
- Main ingredients: Hominy, meat (usually pork or chicken), chile peppers, seasonings
- Variations: Blanco, Verde, Rojo

Pozole (Spanish pronunciation: [po'sole]; from Nahuatl languages: pozolli) is a traditional soup or stew from Mexican cuisine. It is made from hominy with meat (typically chicken or pork), and can be seasoned and garnished with shredded lettuce or cabbage, chili peppers, onion, garlic, radishes, avocado, salsa or limes. Known in Mesoamerica since the pre-Columbian era, the stew is common across Mexico and neighboring countries, served both as a day-to-day meal and as a festive dish.

== Description ==
Pozole can be prepared in many ways, but all variations include a base of cooked hominy in broth. The broth is most commonly made with chicken or pork, but vegetarian preparations exist. When the broth is meat-based, pieces of the meat used to make the broth are usually served in the final dish; vegetarian versions substitute beans for the meat.

The three main types of pozole are blanco (white), verde (green), and rojo (red). Pozole blanco—"white pozole"—is the preparation without any additional green or red sauce. Pozole verde—"green pozole"—adds a rich salsa verde based on green ingredients, possibly including tomatillos, epazote, cilantro, green chiles (typically jalapeños or serranos), or pepitas. Pozole rojo—"red pozole"—is similar, but using a salsa roja made from one or more dried or smoked red chiles, such as guajillo, piquin, or ancho, and usually tomato.

Pozole is commonly served accompanied by a wide variety of toppings, particularly raw vegetables. Common toppings include chopped onion, shredded cabbage, sliced radish, avocado, limes, oregano, tostadas, chicharrón, and chiles.

== Regional customs ==
Pozole is also considered a festive dish. In Mexico and in New Mexico, pozole is typically served on New Year's Eve to celebrate the new year. Pozole is frequently served as a celebratory dish throughout Mexico and in Hispanic communities outside Mexico. Other occasions for serving pozole include Mexican Independence Day, birthdays, Christmas, and other holidays.

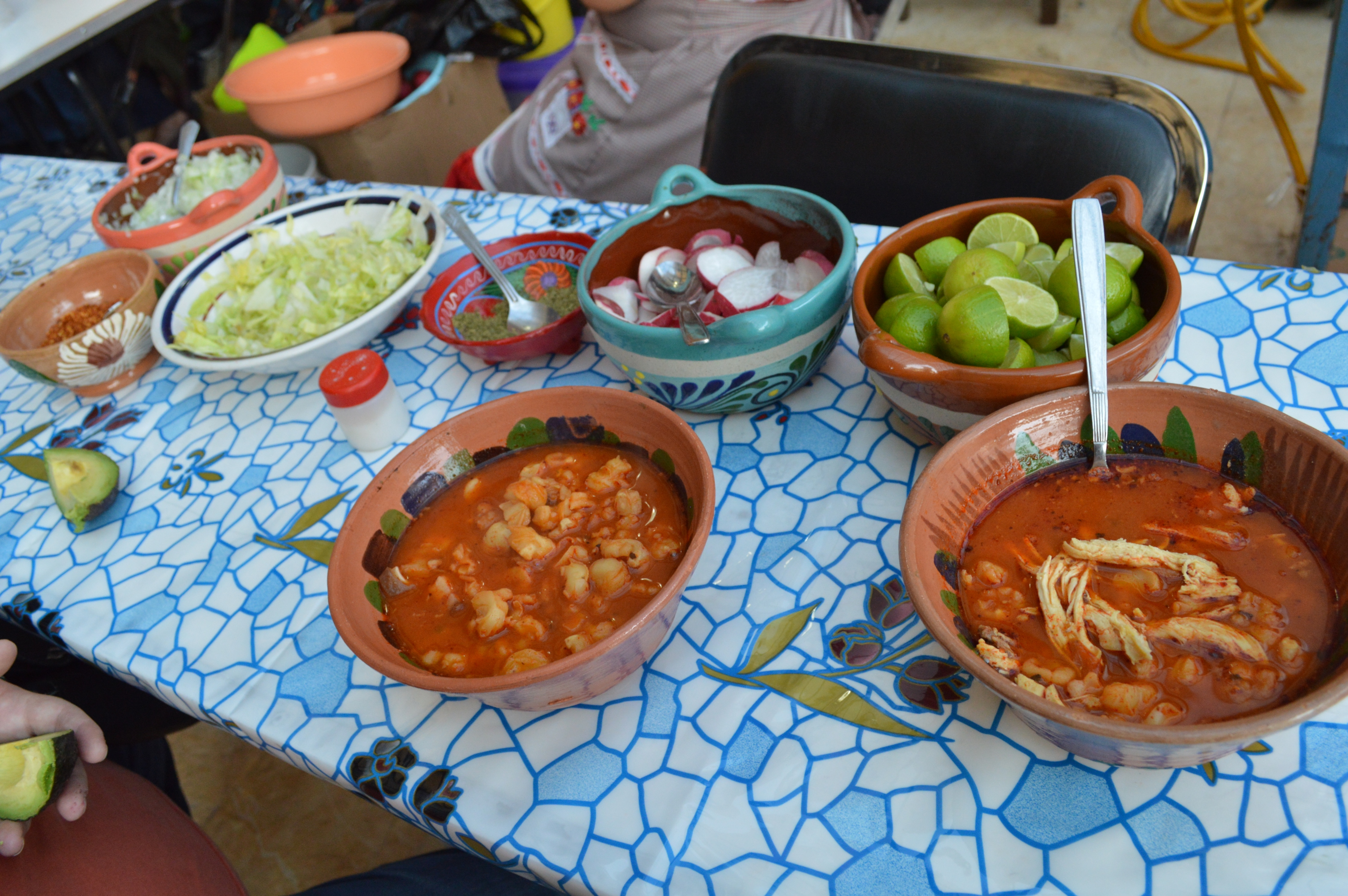
Red pozole with common accompaniments (including lime, shredded lettuce, and sliced radish) (Mexico City, 2015)

Pozole is a typical dish in various states, such as Nayarit, Sinaloa, Michoacán, Guerrero, Zacatecas, Jalisco, and Morelos. Pozole is served in Mexican restaurants worldwide. It is also popular in the cuisine of New Mexico where it is known as posole, and is a common dish among the Puebloan Indigenous peoples residing along the Rio Grande.

In the Southwestern United States, a type of field corn (posole corn) is used that differs from hominy. It is considered to be more flavorful and has a firmer texture than hominy, which tends to be softer and mushier. The Hopi people make a variety called noquivi (Hopi: nöqkwivi), using lamb or mutton rather than the traditional pork. It is often made from dried blue corn posole kernels; green chiles and juniper berries (instead of bay leaves) are added to the stew. This variety of posole is also prepared by the Puebloan people of New Mexico.

== History ==
This drawing from page 22 of the Codex Magliabechiano depicts pozole.

Pozole was mentioned in the 16th century Florentine Codex by Bernardino de Sahagún. Since maize was a sacred plant for the Aztecs and other inhabitants of Mesoamerica, pozole was made to be consumed on special occasions.

== Gallery ==
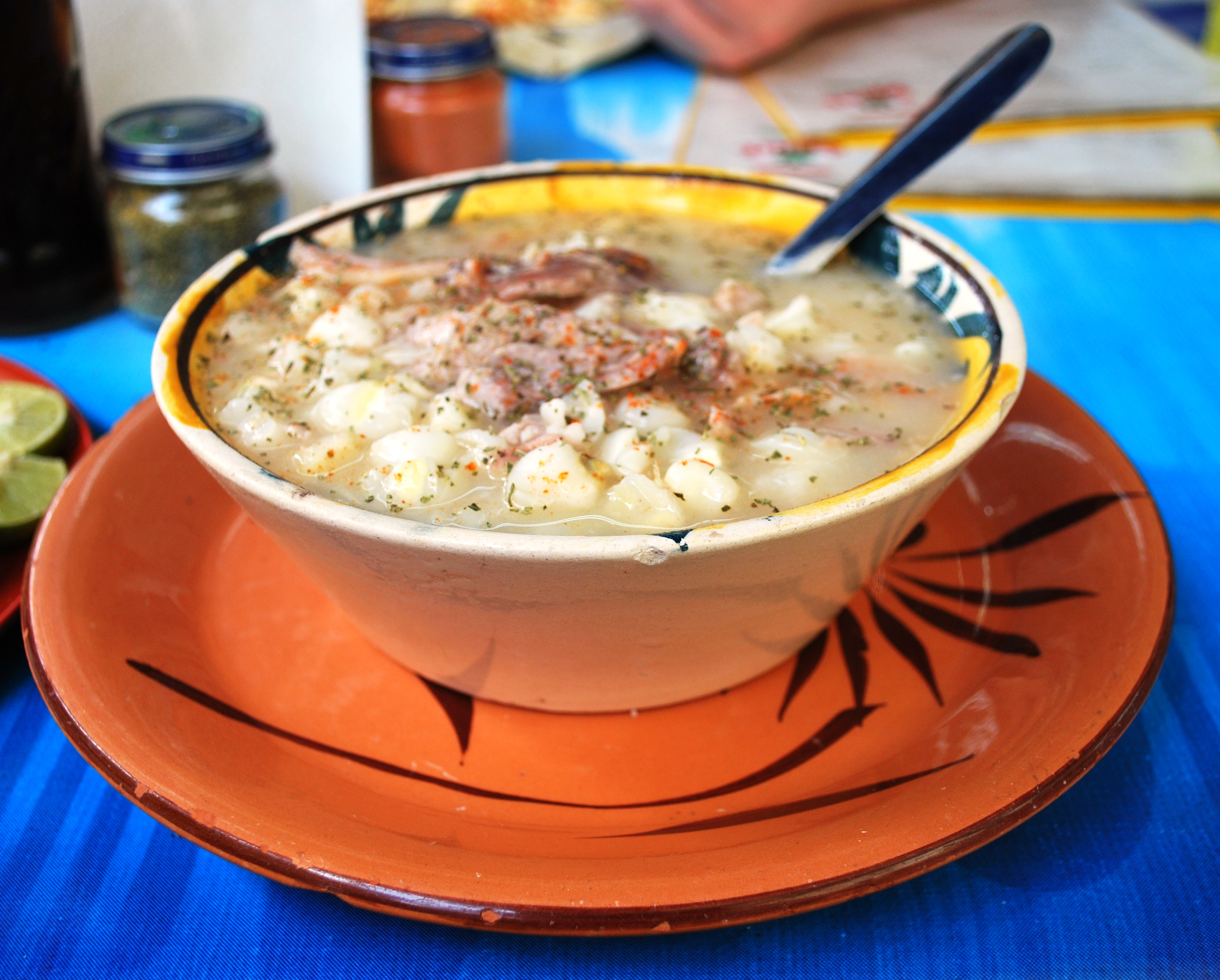
White pozole

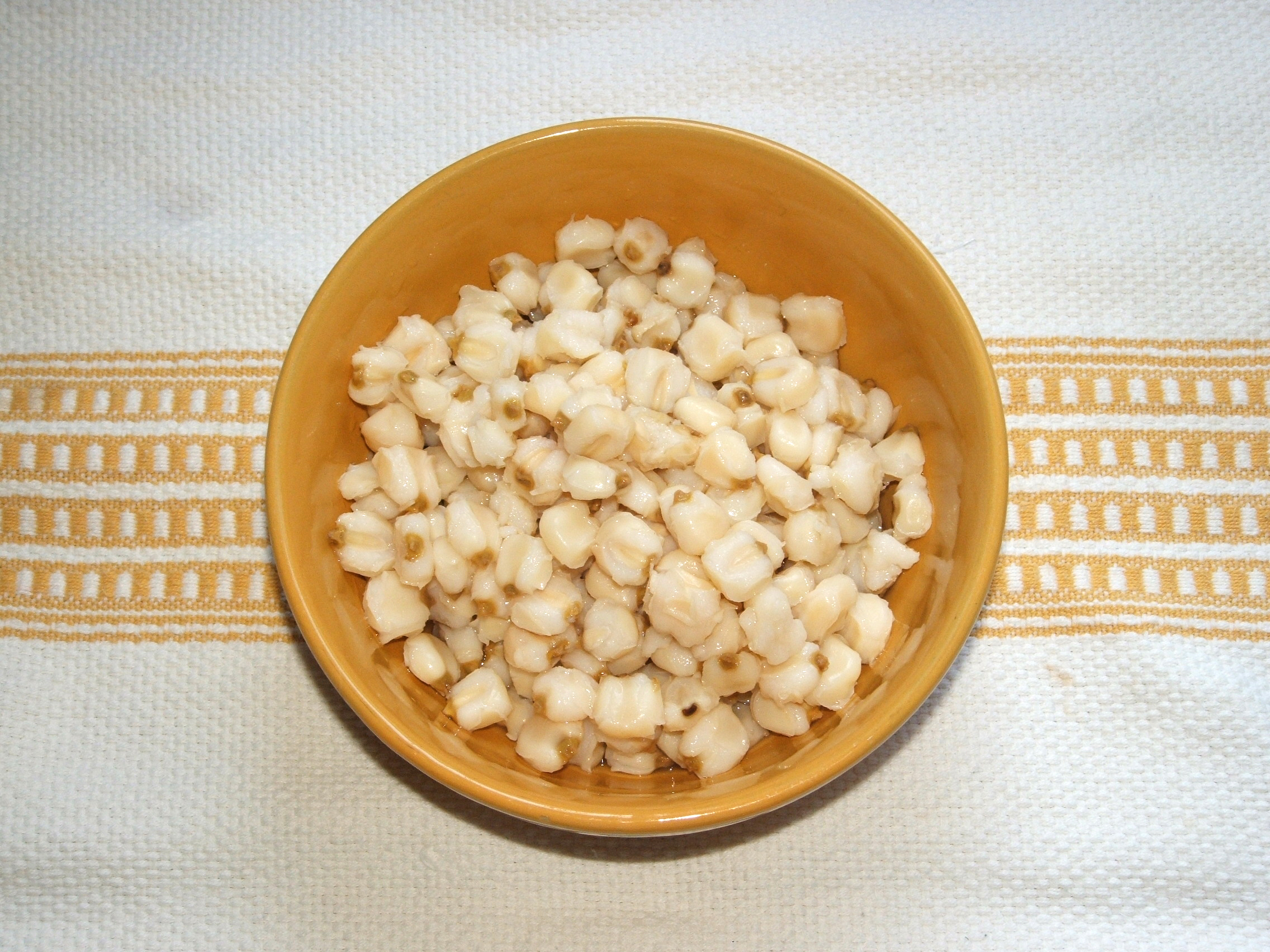
Cooked hominy

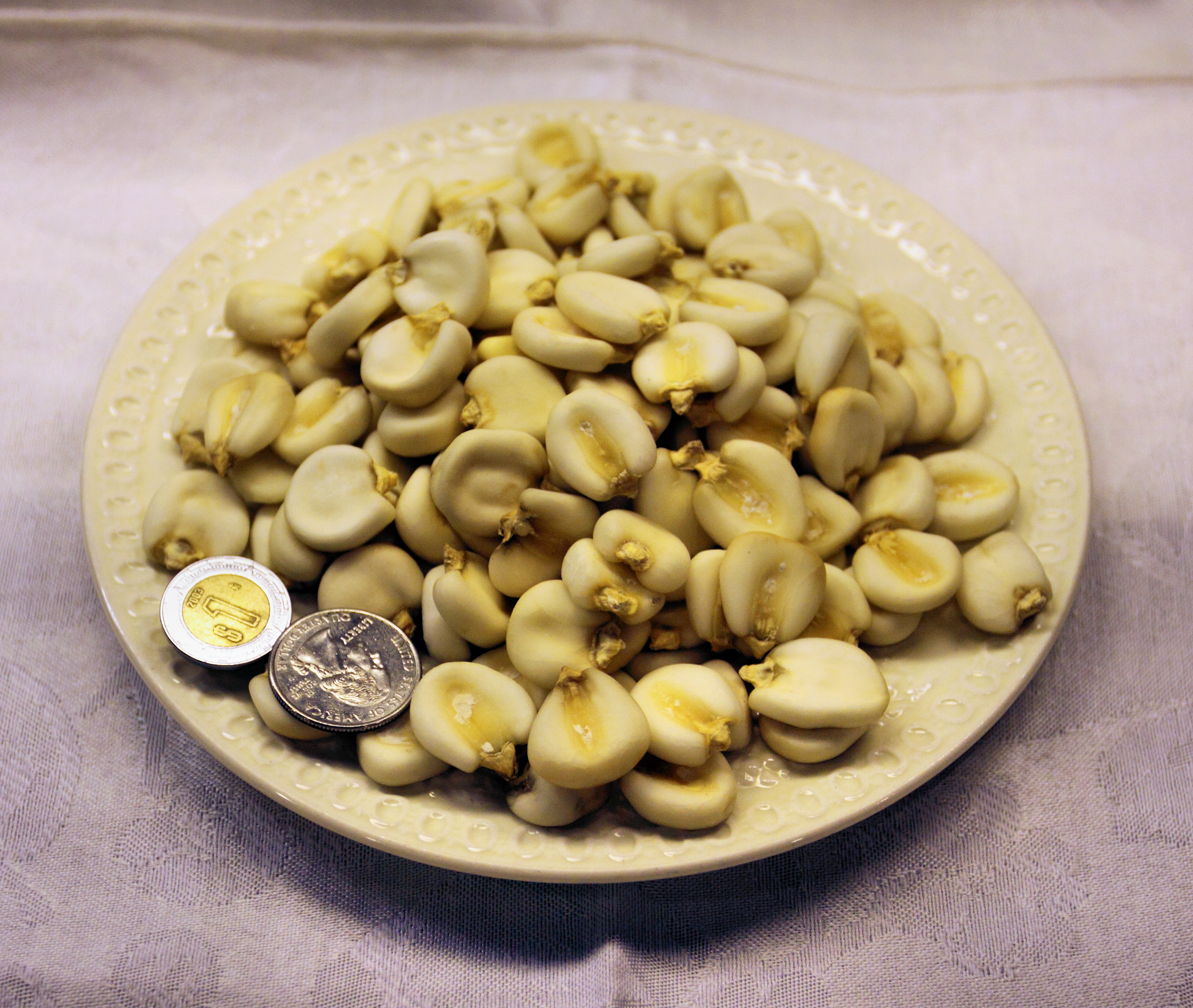
Dried hominy can be used for pozole, but it must be soaked and cooked.

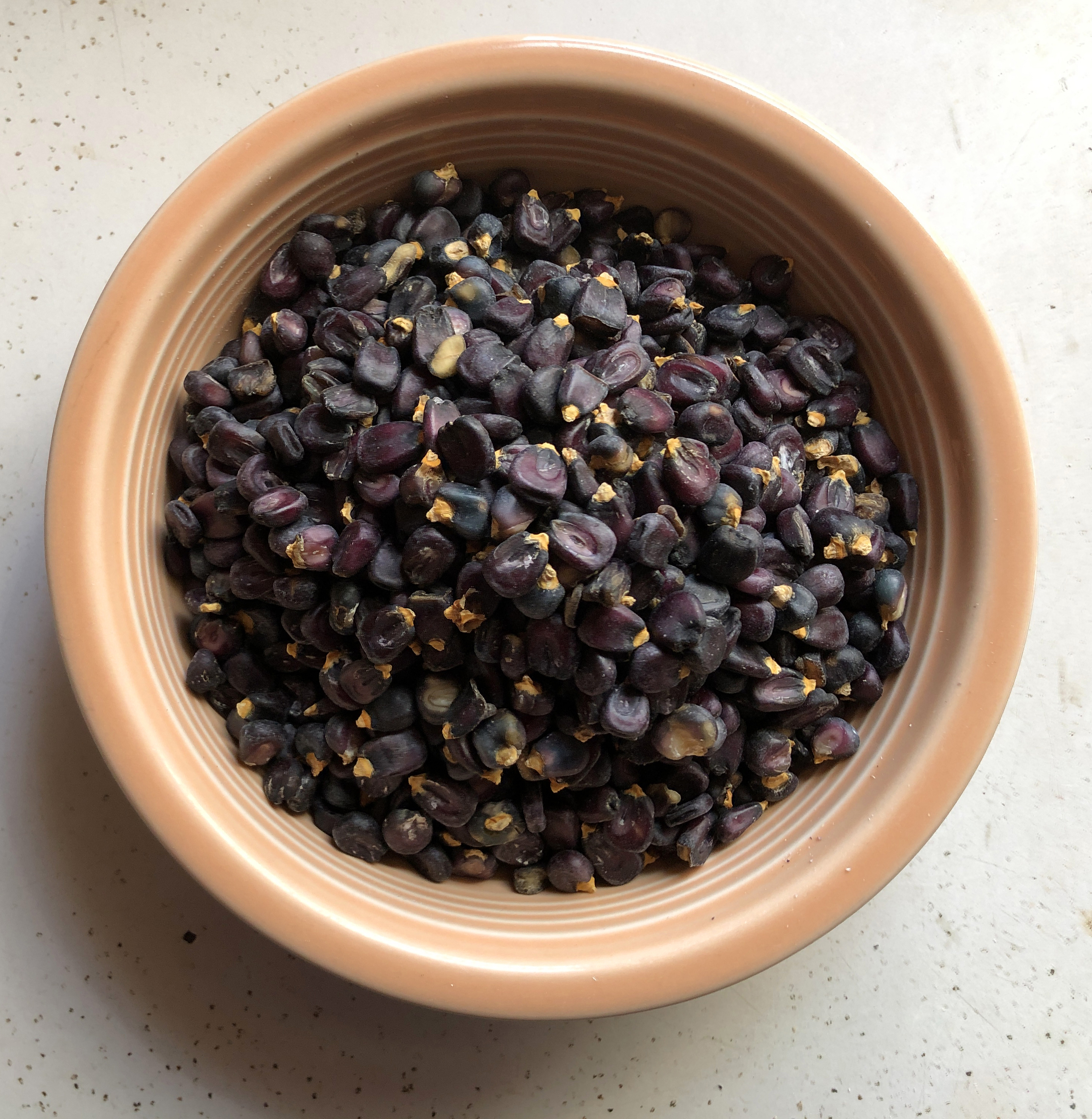
Dried New Mexican blue posole field corn

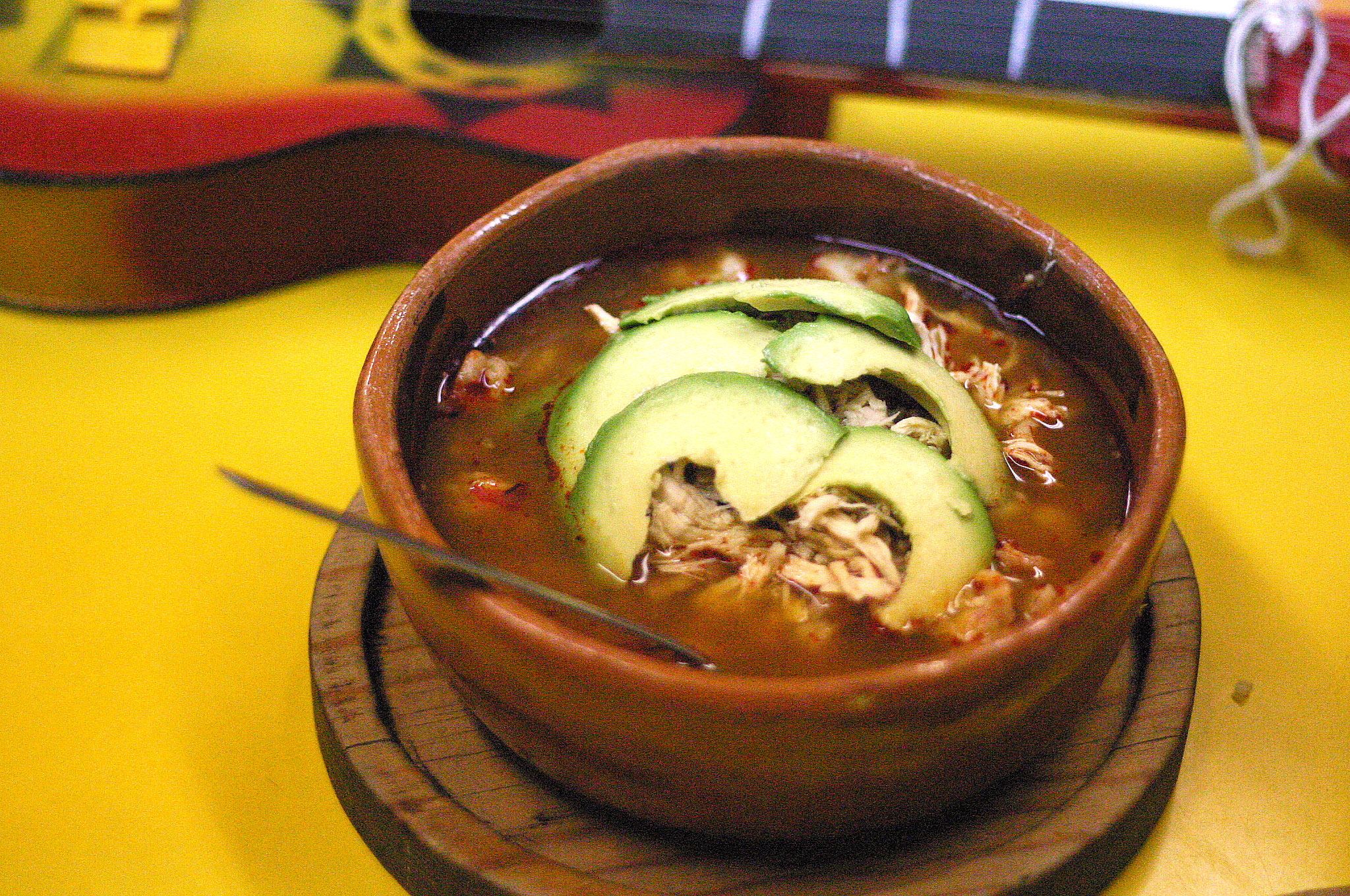
Pozole topped with sliced avocado

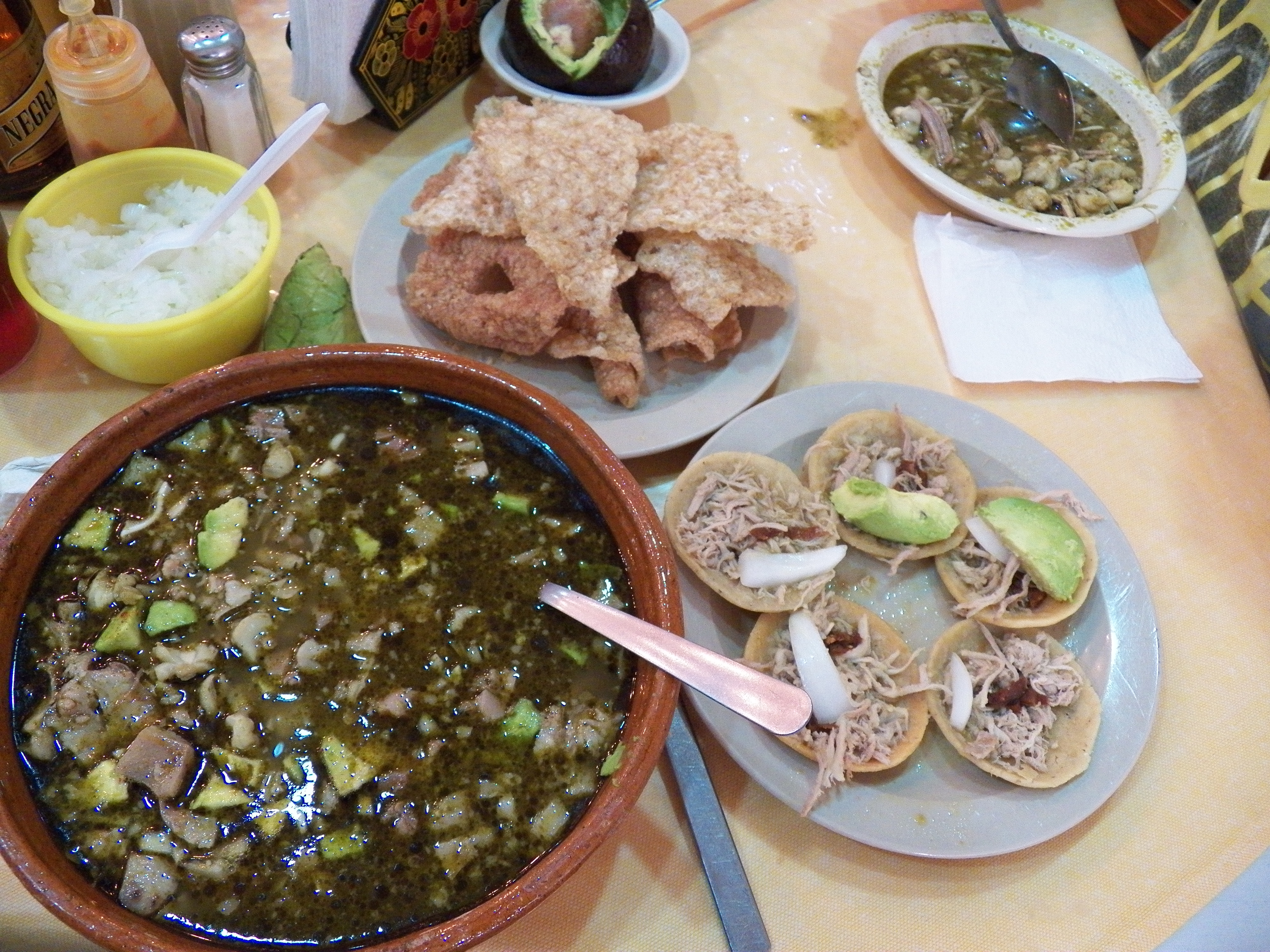
Green pozole, cooked in Guerrero State fashion

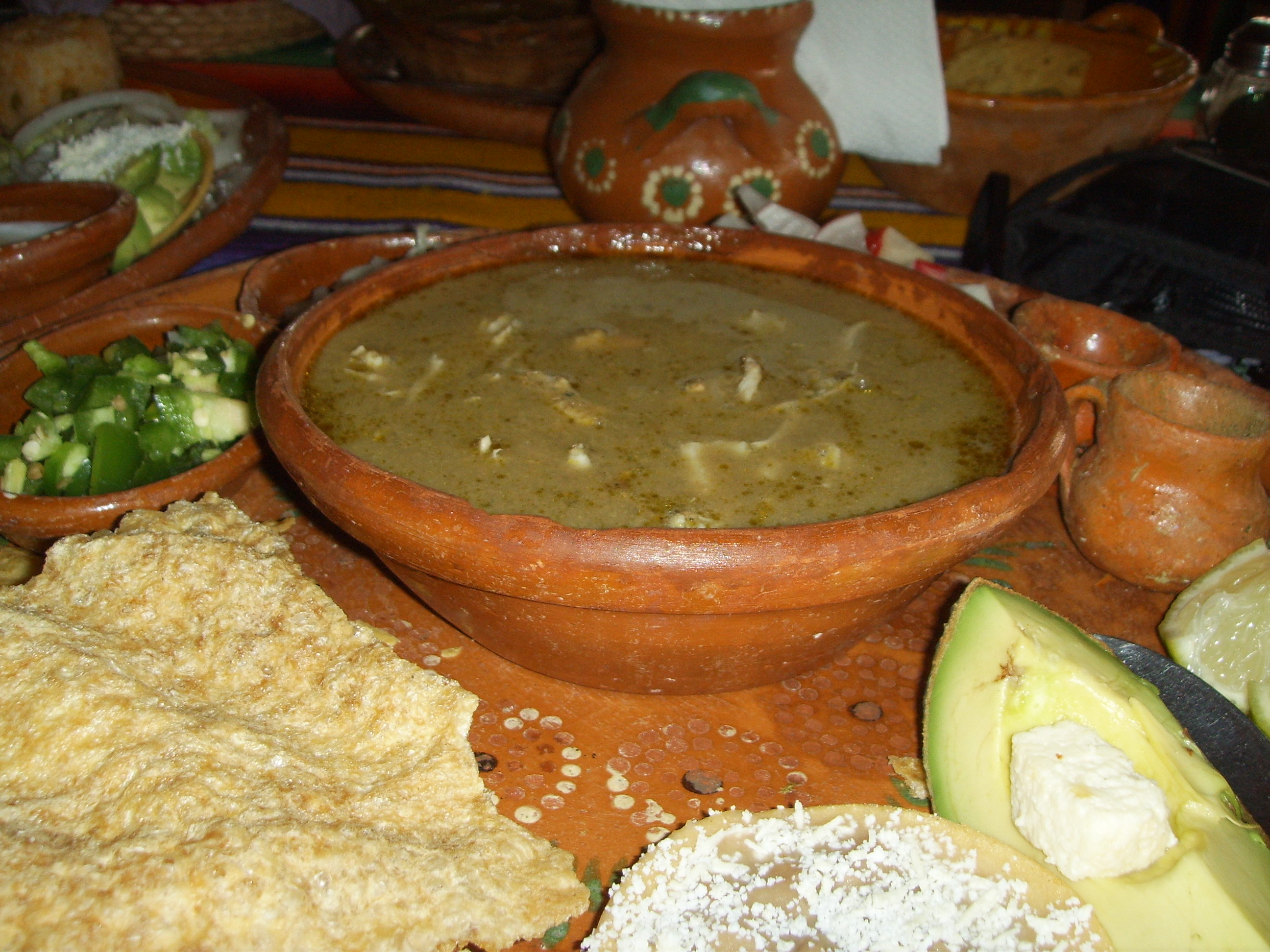
Green pozole, with condiments, served in Zihuatanejo (Guerrero)

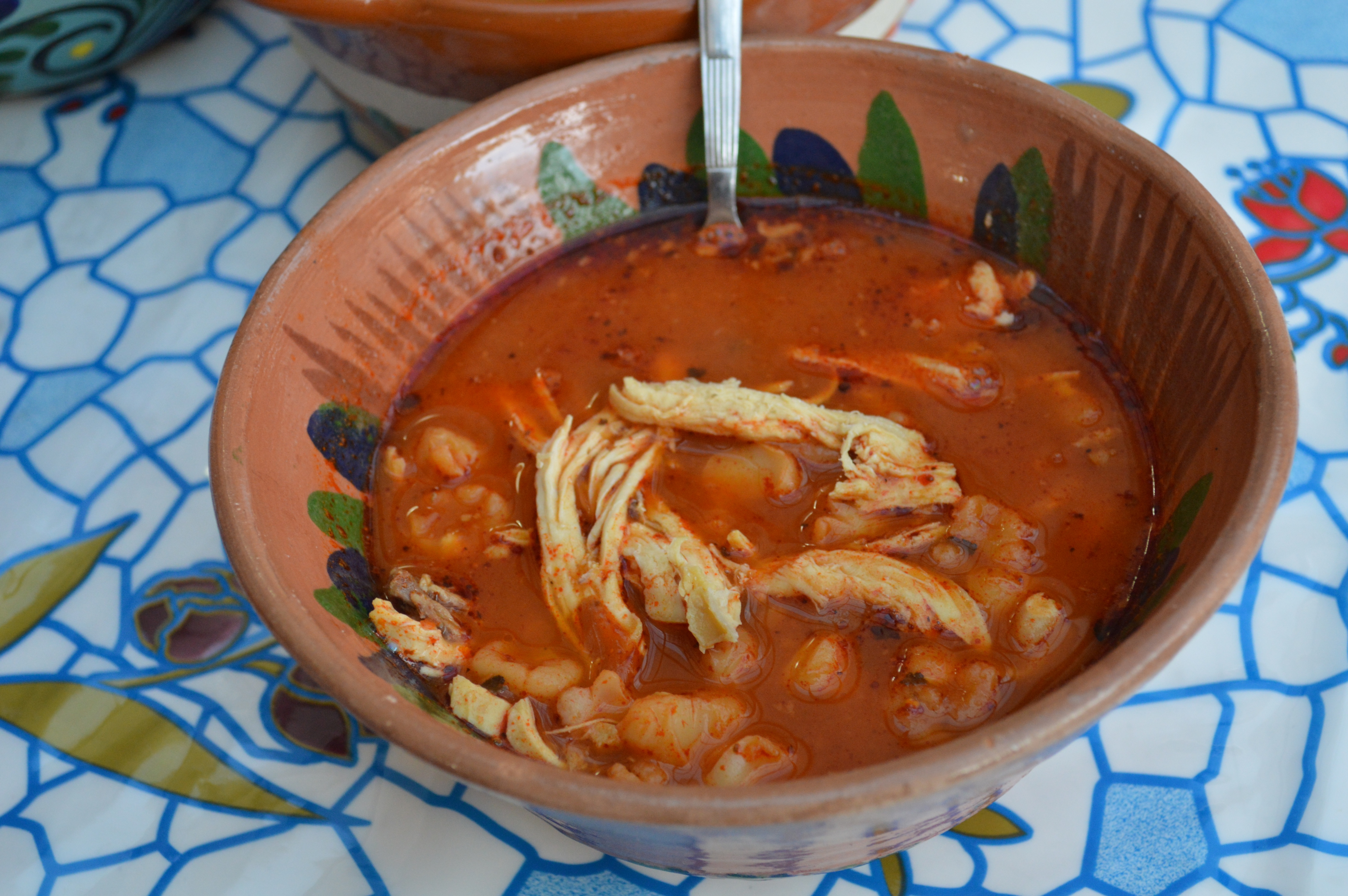
Red pozole, served in Mexico City

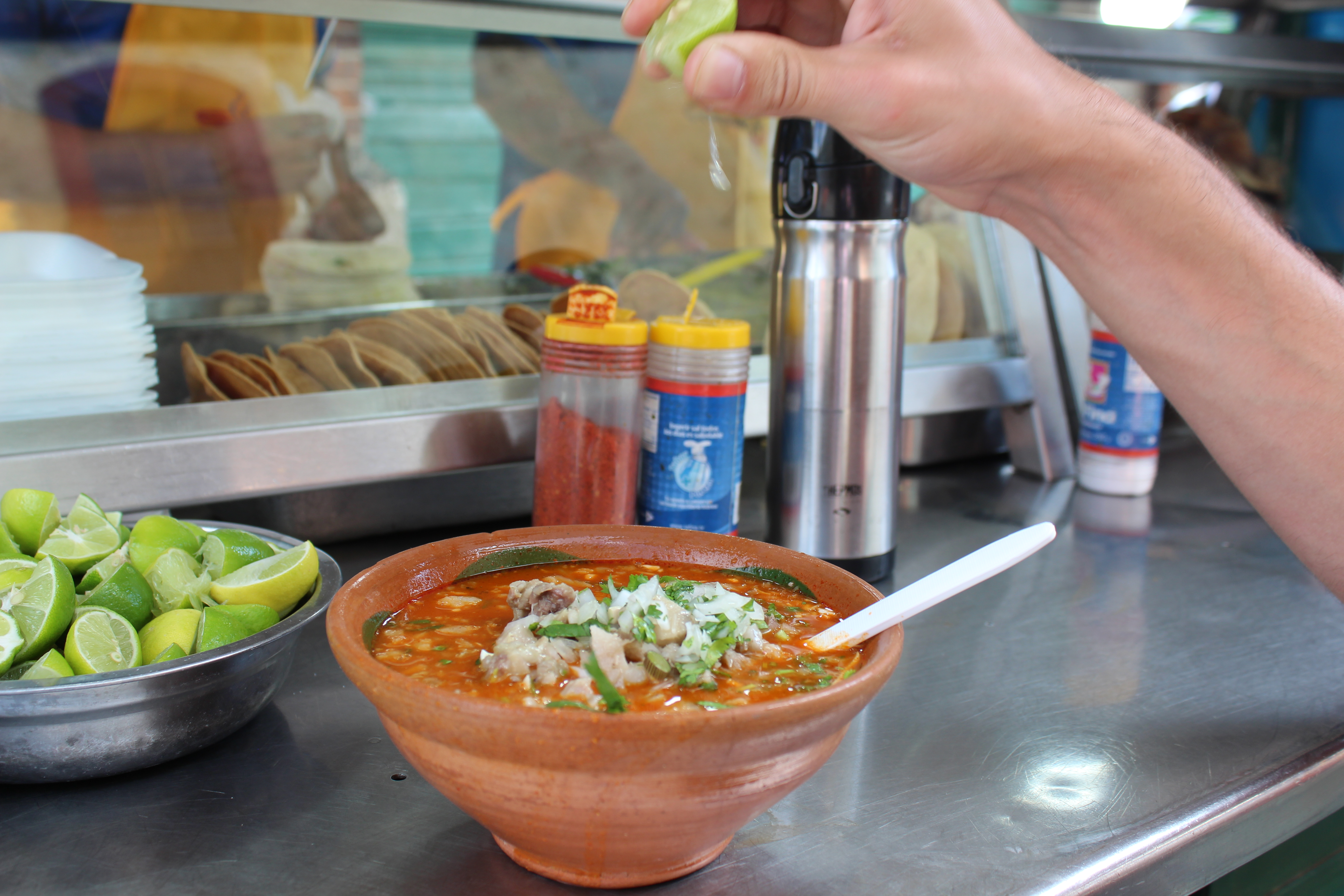
Red pozole, served in Oaxaca de Juárez

== See also ==
- Fricasé
- List of maize dishes
- List of Mexican dishes
- List of soups
- List of stews
- Menudo (soup) – a similar dish made with tripe
