= Hair of the dog =

Colloquial expression

"Hair of the dog", short for "hair of the dog that bit you", is a colloquial expression in the English language predominantly used to refer to alcohol that is consumed as a hangover remedy (with the aim of lessening the effects of a hangover). Many other languages have their own phrase to describe the same concept. The idea may have some basis in science in the difference between ethanol and methanol metabolism.

== Etymology ==
The expression originally referred to a method of treatment for a rabid dog bite by placing hair from the dog in the bite wound. Ebenezer Cobham Brewer writes in the Dictionary of Phrase and Fable (1898): "In Scotland it is a popular belief that a few hairs of the dog that bit you applied to the wound will prevent evil consequences. Applied to drinks, it means, if overnight you have indulged too freely, take a glass of the same wine within 24 hours to soothe the nerves. 'If this dog do you bite, soon as out of your bed, take a hair of the tail the next day.'" He also cites two apocryphal poems containing the phrase, one of which is attributed to Aristophanes. It is possible that the phrase was used to justify an existing practice, as the idea of "like cures like" (Latin: similia similibus curantur) dates back at least to the time of Hippocrates. The idea was also postulated by Pliny the Elder, who wrote "When a person has been bitten by a mad dog, he may be preserved from hydrophobia by applying the ashes of a dog's head to the wound." Likewise he claimed one could "insert in the wound ashes of hairs from the tail of the dog that inflicted the bite." This idea exists today as the basic postulate of classical homeopathy.

An early example of modern usage (poil de ce chien) can be found in Rabelais' 16th-century pentalogy Gargantua and Pantagruel, literally translated by Motteux in the late 17th century.

In the 1930s cocktails known as Corpse Revivers were served in hotels.

== In other languages ==
=== Europe ===
The phrase also exists in Hungarian, where the literal translation to English is "(You may cure) the dog's bite with its fur", but has evolved into a short phrase ("kutyaharapást szőrével") that is used frequently in other contexts when one is trying to express that the solution to a problem is more of the problem.

Among the Irish and Mexicans, the phrase "The Cure" (curarse la cruda in Spanish) is often used instead of "hair of the dog". It is used, often sarcastically, in the question "Going for a Cure?". In Portuguese, people speak of "a rebound" (uma rebatida), meaning the recoil of the hangover).

In some Slavic languages (Polish, Bosnian, Bulgarian, Croatian, Serbian, Slovenian, and Russian), hair of the dog is called "a wedge" (klin), mirroring the concept of dislodging a stuck wedge with another one; hence the popular Polish phrase "[to dislodge] a wedge [with] a wedge" – [wybijać] klin klinem – which is used figuratively both with regard to alcohol and in other contexts. In Bulgarian, the phrase is Клин клин избива (using the "wedge" metaphor common in other Slavic languages). The proper Russian term is опохмелка (opohmelka, "after being drunk"), which indicates a process of drinking to decrease effects of drinking the day before. In Estonia, the phrase used is peaparandus, which literally translated is "head-repair".

A similar usage is encountered in Romanian, in the phrase Cui pe cui se scoate ("A nail (fastener) pulls out a nail"); in Italian, in the phrase Chiodo scaccia chiodo; in Spanish, in the phrase Un clavo saca otro clavo ("A nail pulls out another nail"). In all three cases, the English translation is "a nail dislodges a nail", though these phrases are not exclusively used to refer to the hangover cure.

In German, drinking alcohol the next morning to relieve the symptoms is sometimes described as "having a counter-beer" (ein Konterbier trinken). In Austria people talk about having a "repair-beer" (Reparatur-Seidl).

The Dutch have also coined the portmanteaux reparadler and reparipa, referring to Radler and IPA as repair beverages. The term "Morning-afterpils" is also used ("pils" being one of the most popular types of beer in the Netherlands).

In Norwegian, it is usually called repareringspils, meaning a "beer to repair". In Czech, it is called vyprošťovák ("extricator"). In Swedish, drinking alcohol to relieve a hangover is called having an återställare, which translates roughly to "restorer". In Danish, a beer the day after drinking is called a reparationsbajer, which translates to "repair beer". There is also a saying: "One must rise at the tree where one fell". Similarly, in Dutch, the term reparatiebier is frequently used, which also translates to "repair beer".

In Finnish, consuming alcohol the next day is called tasoittava ("smoothener", "equalizer"), loiventava ("leveller") or korjaussarja ("a repair kit"). Also the phrase Sillä se lähtee millä tulikin that translates to "What caused it, will also cure it", describes the same concept.

In French, soigner le mal par le mal ("cure evil with evil") refers to the ancient belief of fitting a disease with the same origins and is said in case of a hangover as you drink again.

In Icelandic, a hangover cure is called Afréttari, translating to "a straightener", which plays upon the idea that if you are feeling hungover, the first drink will "straighten you out" or lift you back up to your normal state.

=== The Americas ===
In Colombia, the same expression is used: pelo del mismo perro ("hair of the same dog"). In Costa Rica (Central America), the dog is replaced with a pig, as in "hair of the same pig" (pelos de la misma chancha in Central America). In Puerto Rico, the relevant expression is matar al ratón, or "to kill the mouse".

=== Asia ===
The earliest known reference to the phrase "hair of the dog" in connection with drunkenness is found in a text from ancient Ugarit dating from the mid to late second millennium BC, in which the god ʾIlu becomes hungover after a drinking binge. The text includes a recipe for a salve to be applied to the forehead, which consists of "hairs of a dog" and parts of an unknown plant mixed with olive oil.

In Korea, alcohol (typically soju) drunk in the morning to relieve hangovers is called haejangsul (해장술), which literally translates as "a drink that relieves the bowels". In China, alcohol drunk to relieve a hangover is called huíhúnjiǔ (回魂酒), which literally translates as "the drink that brings back your soul". In Japan, the equivalent phrase is mukaezake (迎え酒), which can be literally translated as "alcohol for facing (greeting) the next day."

=== Africa ===
In Cape Afrikaans, drinking alcohol to cure a hangover (babbelas) is called kopskiet, or "shot to the head". In Tanzania, the equivalent Swahili phrase used is kuzimua, which means "assist to wake up after a coma". The phrase also exists in (Sheng) Swahili Slang: in Kenya, taking alcohol to relieve a hangover is called kutoa lock, translating to "removing the lock".

== Scientific background ==
There are at least two hypotheses as to how "hair of the dog" works. In the first, hangovers are viewed as the first stage of alcohol withdrawal, which is then alleviated by further alcohol intake. Although "...Low [ethanol] doses may effectively prevent alcohol withdrawal syndrome in surgical patients", this idea is questionable as the signs and symptoms of hangover and alcohol withdrawal are very different.

In the second, hangovers are partly attributed to methanol metabolism. Levels of methanol, present as a congener in alcohol, have been correlated with severity of hangover and methanol metabolism to the highly toxic formate via formaldehyde coincides with the rate of appearance of hangover symptoms. As both ethanol and methanol are metabolized by alcohol dehydrogenase – and this enzyme has a greater binding affinity for ethanol than for methanol – drinking more of the former effectively prevents (or delays) the metabolism of the latter.
