= Salteña =

Bolivian meat pastry

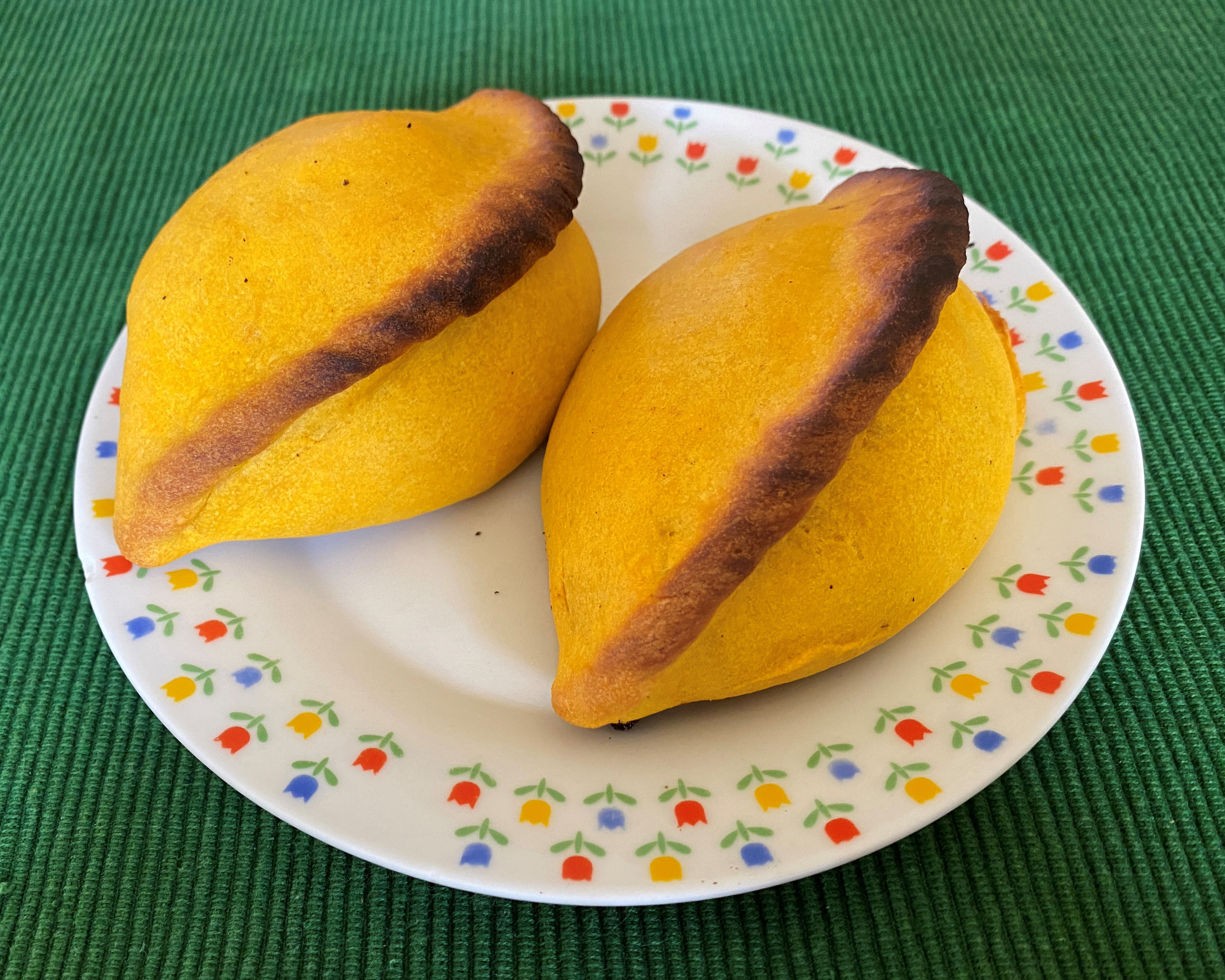
- Two salteñas on a plate
- Type: Empanada
- Place of origin: Bolivia
- Main ingredients: Beef, pork or chicken

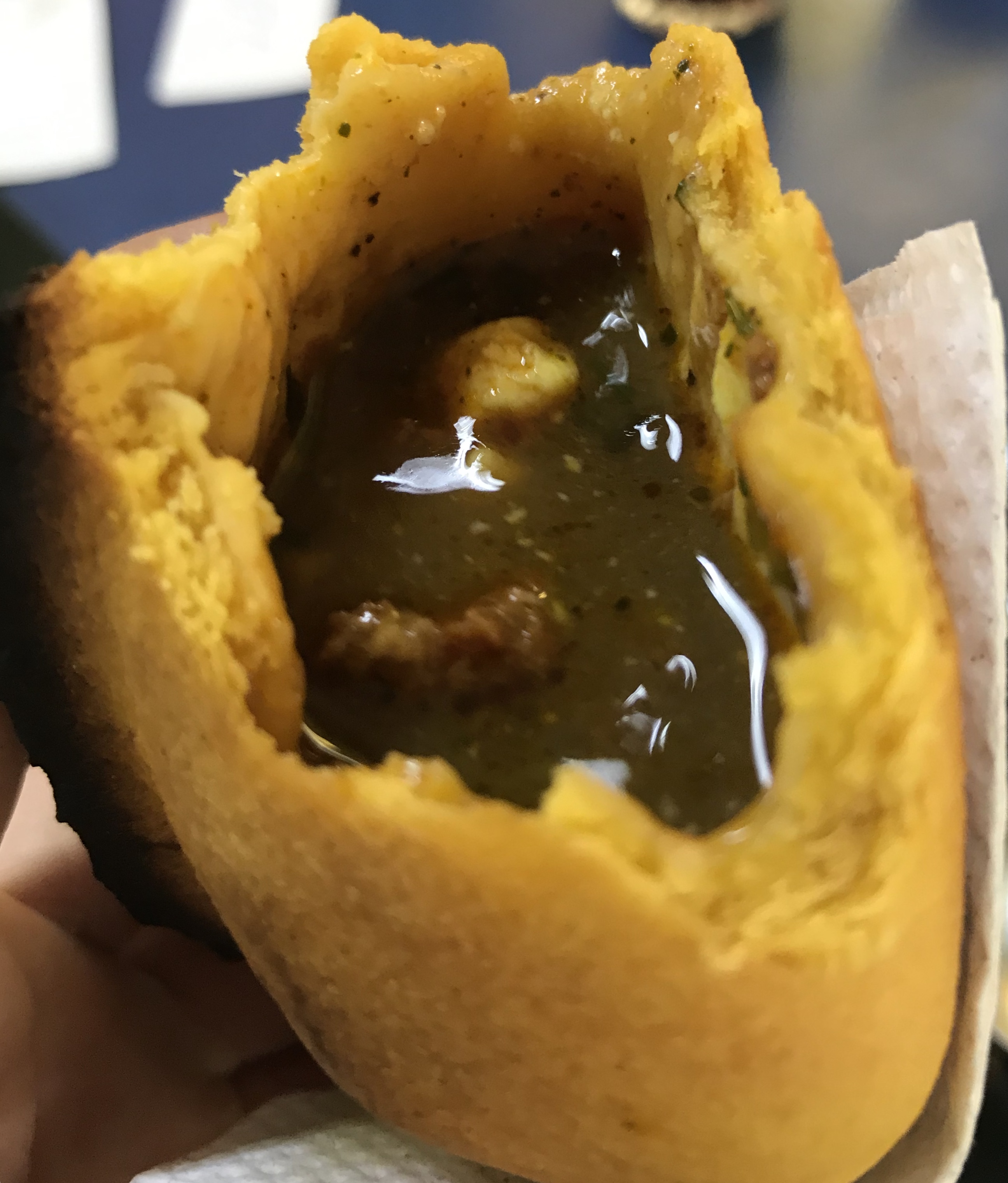
Inside of a salteña, featuring its sweet, mildly spicy sauce

A salteña is a Bolivian type of baked empanada, a type of turnover. Salteñas are savory pastries filled with beef, pork or chicken mixed in a sweet, slightly spicy sauce containing ají, potatoes and sometimes egg. Vegetarian salteñas are sometimes available at certain restaurants. Salteñas are filled with a juicy gelatin-based stew that is solid when prepared, but melts when they are baked; the pastry is hard and sweet, not like other empanadas.

Typically salteñas can be found in any town or city throughout the country, but each area has its variations; Cochabamba and Sucre claim to have the best version of this snack, and many will go out of their way to try the variation from Potosí. In La Paz and Santa Cruz de la Sierra, it is a tradition to enjoy salteñas as a mid-morning snack especially on Sundays, although vendors often start selling salteñas very early in the morning. The pastries are sold anywhere from 7 am to noon; most vendors sell out by mid-morning.

== History ==
Empanadas spread throughout almost all of Latin America during the Spanish colonization.

In Potosí, a modified version of this dish emerged around the 16th century possibly as a result of the cold weather. Broth and regional spices such as chili and potato were added. It became a traditional recipe in Potosí and later throughout Bolivia.

The version that Leonora de Flores created the salteña appears in the novel Potosí 1600 (2002) by Ramón Rocha Monroy. In an interview with the author, he said that he was inspired by the story of Leonora de Flores, whose children were dying from the cold in Potosí. However, the version that she invented the salteña, as featured in his work, was his own invention. The writer lamented the use of literary works, which are heavily fictional, as sources for historical facts.

For this reason, we only refer to Doña Josepha de Escurrechea, whose 1776 recipe book was found and authenticated by researcher Beatriz Rossells Montalvo.

=== Josepha de Escurrechea ===
The concept of empanada includes a thin flour dough filled with various products, generally those available and preferred by each region, and depending on needs, meat, fish, vegetables, and sweets.

Its best-known origin is the Arab world, but some variations also come from other European countries. It is a sandwich made with dough or bread filled with other ingredients, used especially for travel, such as shepherd's pie and other empanadas from England, at least in its early days.

The existence of empanadas and quite similar cakes (the latter a type of calzone, today's covered pizza) has long been documented as widespread foods in Medieval Europe until the 18th century, and they also appear in the book by Doña Josepha de Escurrechea.

In the different regions of Spain, the empanada continues to be part of the cuisine, with its own unique variations. These include the Galician empanadas, which have retained the large size of times past (similar to Doña Josepha's recipes); the Mallorcan empanadas, filled with vegetables; and a version from almost 300 years ago, found in Madrid bakeries, which used to be called "beef empanada." Since the 18th century, the "veal needle" or "meat needle" is an example of these transformations. It is made with puff pastry and stewed minced beef.

There is no doubt that the Spanish brought the empanada to America. From there, the empanada exists in Latin America, in almost every country, also with its own variations.

The recipe books of Spanish royal chefs were taken seriously by the elites in Spanish America, and therefore, recipes for tortas and empanadas abound, as is the case in the Recetario de doña Josepha de Escurrechea (Potosí, 1776), which includes pastelillos and empanadas, as well as flamenco empanadas (the Spanish Empire had provinces in Flanders).

This is the only colonial recipe book found in Bolivia and the entire region. And in it, the empanadas occupy a notable space. Potosí was once the richest and most important city in the Americas; the nobility enjoyed a high standard of living, and food was no exception.

In these recipes, the various meat or fish fillings, with sweet additions, are mentioned. And the cooking method, baked or fried.

The undeniable contribution of the Potosí hand to the recipes are potatoes and Ají, American ingredients not previously used in European cuisine.

Doña Josepha mentions both ingredients in other dishes that are becoming Americanized in her recipe book. This is in addition to the use of meat and the mention of the rolled-up dough.

Given these specifically established uses, this origin—the only existing document—makes it clear that it was in this city where the preparation of Salteñas began and consolidated, already with the essential addition of potatoes and Ají.

=== Juana Manuela Gorriti ===
The presence of Argentine families in this historical context lent itself to the creation of a legend in La Paz, without any documentary basis, pointing to Mrs. Juana Manuela Gorriti as "the inventor of the salteña" along with her compatriots. The fact is that families from Salta, mainly settled in La Paz, in the 1830s, made these dishes as a way of supporting themselves and surely left some influence. From there, the idea arose that they had introduced empanadas to Bolivia.

In reality, "Eclectic Cuisine" is a compilation of recipes from the countries where she lived (Bolivia and Peru, as well as Argentina), of which (212), without exception, were sent by friends and acquaintances. In the prologue, Gorriti says:

She, only she, (the woman) knows how to invent those exquisite things that make the table a delight, (she then refers to the advice given to a princess) to keep her husband by her side: "Hold him by the mouth." I, alas! I never thought of such a truth. Eager for other regions, I threw myself into books (she mentions several classic authors) without considering that those illustrious geniuses were such, because (...) they all had, at their sides, hardworking and self-sacrificing women who pampered them and fortified their minds with succulent morsels, the fruit of the science most appropriate to women. My friends, to whom, repentant, I confessed, did not accept my mea culpa, except on the condition that I make it public in a book. And, as good and merciful as they were beautiful, they have given me precious materials for this purpose, enriching them even further with the enchanting grace of their words.

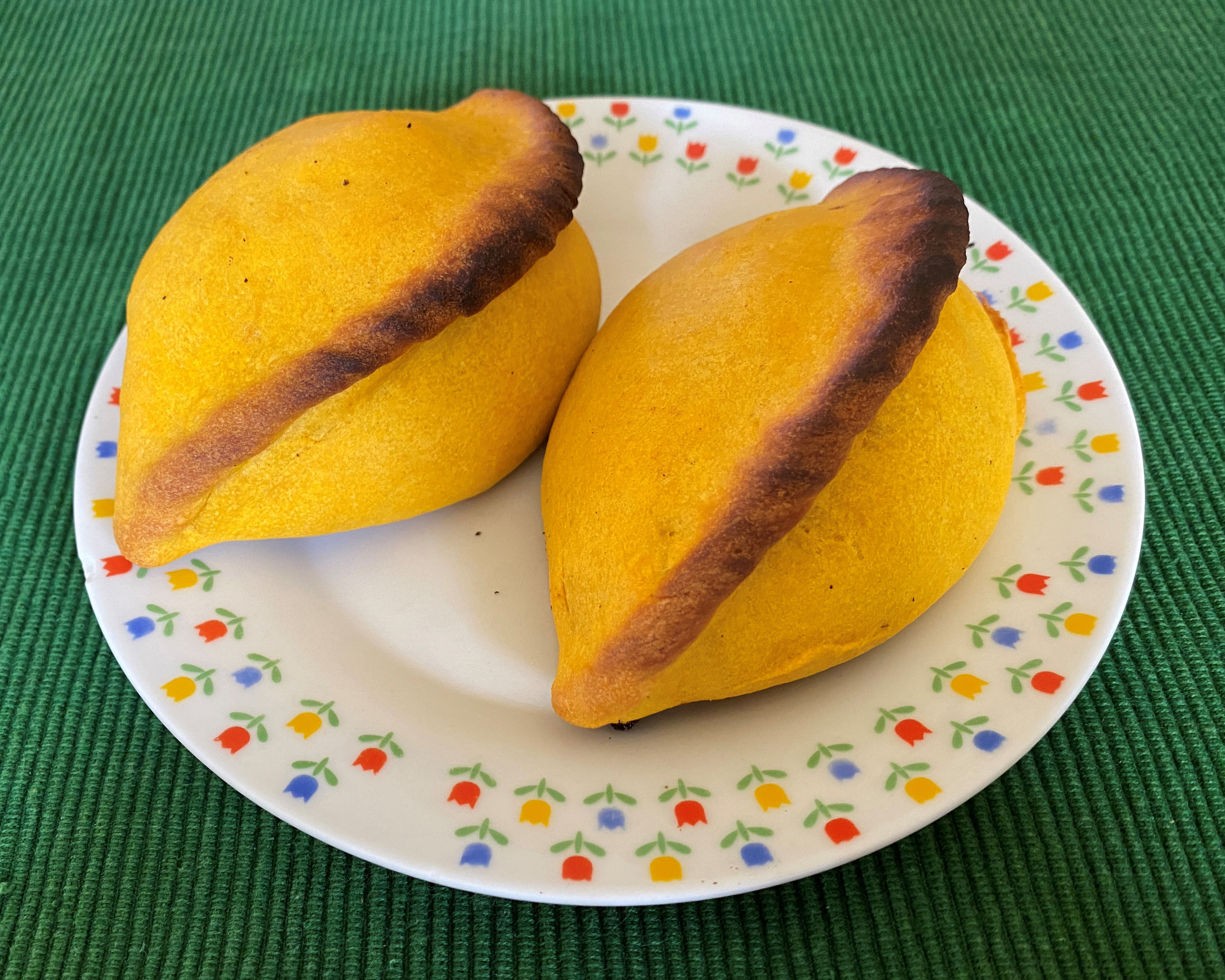
Salteñas de carne

The confession, in which today we can find a certain ironic tone, does not detract one iota from the value of the free and transgressive woman that Gorriti was, as well as a brilliant intellectual.

Instead, it helps to clarify a less-than-serious version of the story being reproduced.

The history of gastronomy, based on critical research, has become a highly advanced field of knowledge in many countries, thanks to the rise of this global industry that serves as a fundamental element of tourism, along with the emergence of great chefs, top-level culinary schools, and millions of cookbooks sold. Gorriti's cookbook contained these recipes:

The first, called "emparededados a la rosarina" (Rosario-style sandwiches), sent from Rosario, suggests using slices of bread soaked in milk. The filling is deboned chicken with pieces of ham, plus pepper, flour, and ground garlic, all fried in butter, and placed between the fried slices "like a cold cut."

The second, called "empanada fiambre" (a cold cut empanada), comes from Arequipa. The recipe indicates how to prepare the dough. The only filling is slices of ham and a layer of pitted black olives. The sandwiches are baked.

The last recipe is called "empanaditas a la coquetuela." It uses puff pastry cut into squares. The filling is a mince seasoned with pepper, cumin, fried white onion, a clove of garlic, almonds, and raisins.

=== Manuel Camilo Crespo ===
The historical continuity of the empanada can be seen in two recipes by Manuel Camilo Crespo from the mid-19th century in La Paz, one of them called "empanadas en caldo."

While none of the three recipes in Gorriti's book, from Argentina, contain ají or potatoes (the specific and essential components of the Bolivian empanada).

Furthermore, the empanadas in Gorriti's cookbook have nothing to do with Bolivian empanadas.

=== Recipe consolidation ===
The Bolivian empanada became widely established with the recipe book by Sofía Urquidi (Sucre, 1917), which contains no fewer than eight recipes for broth empanadas (three of them with ají), as they were called in Sucre until the 1970s, confirming the nature of the Bolivian empanada.

== Origin of the name ==
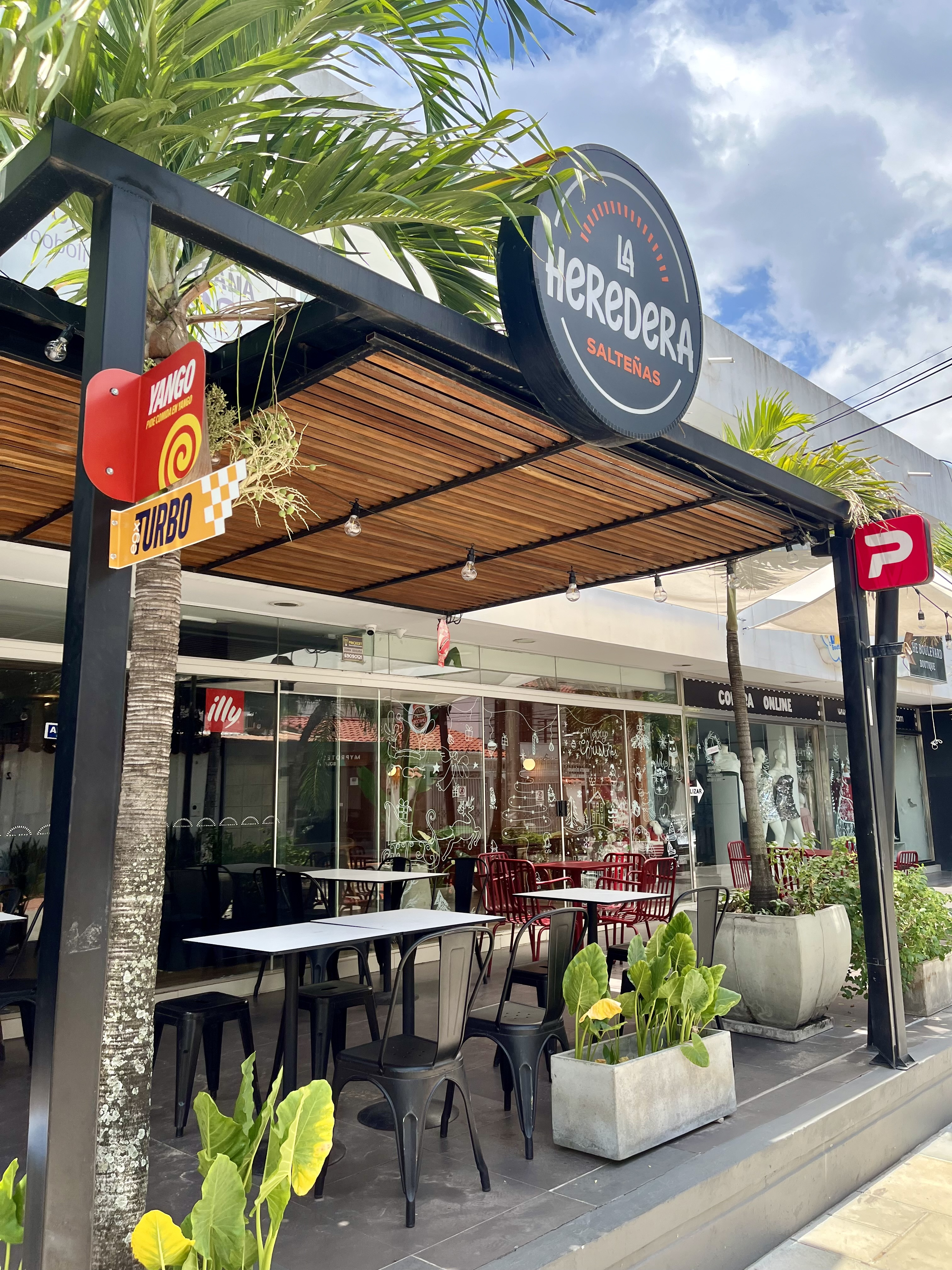
Salteñería in Santa Cruz de la Sierra.

The name 'salteña' refers to the place of origin of one of its famous cooks, Juana Manuela Gorriti, born in Salta province, Argentina.

Historian Antonio Paredes Candia has investigated the origin of this:

At the beginning of the 19th century, Mrs. Gorriti, who would later become the wife of President Manuel Isidoro Belzu, had to flee into exile with her family during the government of Juan Manuel de Rosas, settling in the city of Potosí, in Bolivia.

For many years the Gorriti family was marked by extreme poverty.

Out of desperation, she began preparing "soupy empanadas."

The sale of these products became very popular around the same time as Manuela, who was nicknamed "la salteña," referring to her place of origin.

Paredes Candia mentions that parents would tell their children: "Go and get an empanada from la salteña." As time passed, many forgot Manuela Gorriti's name, but the nickname "las salteñas" (the salteñas) stuck. Today it can be found in a large number of businesses throughout Bolivia and has been so widely accepted that it has reached the international market.

== Variations ==
=== Brazil ===
The salteña is popular in the Brazilian states of Mato Grosso do Sul, Mato Grosso, Rondônia, and Acre, a former Brazilian territory that was part of Bolivia until 1903, where it is known as a saltenha. Other names for the pastry include empanada caldosa, empanada da saltenha, pastelzinho recheado, pastel assado, and empanada boliviana. The saltenha is especially popular in Corumbá, a city in Mato Grosso do Sul that borders Bolivia, where the Ardaya family of Bolivian descent opened the city's first saltenharia (place where saltenhas are sold) in 1978 on the corner of Rua Sete de Setembro and Delamare. Saltenhas have been sold in Rio Branco, the capital of Acre, since at least 1979 when the Cantinho Lanche do Pastor was opened by Pastor Mugramy, who is of Syrian and Bolivian descent. The store is still open as of 2021 and is operated by his children and grandchildren.

Today, saltenhas can be found alongside other Brazilian salgadinhos in dining establishments throughout the country.

== See also ==
- Bolivian cuisine
- Pasty
- Xiaolongbao – another dumpling with a gelatin-based liquid filling
