= Bolivian cuisine =

Culinary traditions of Bolivia

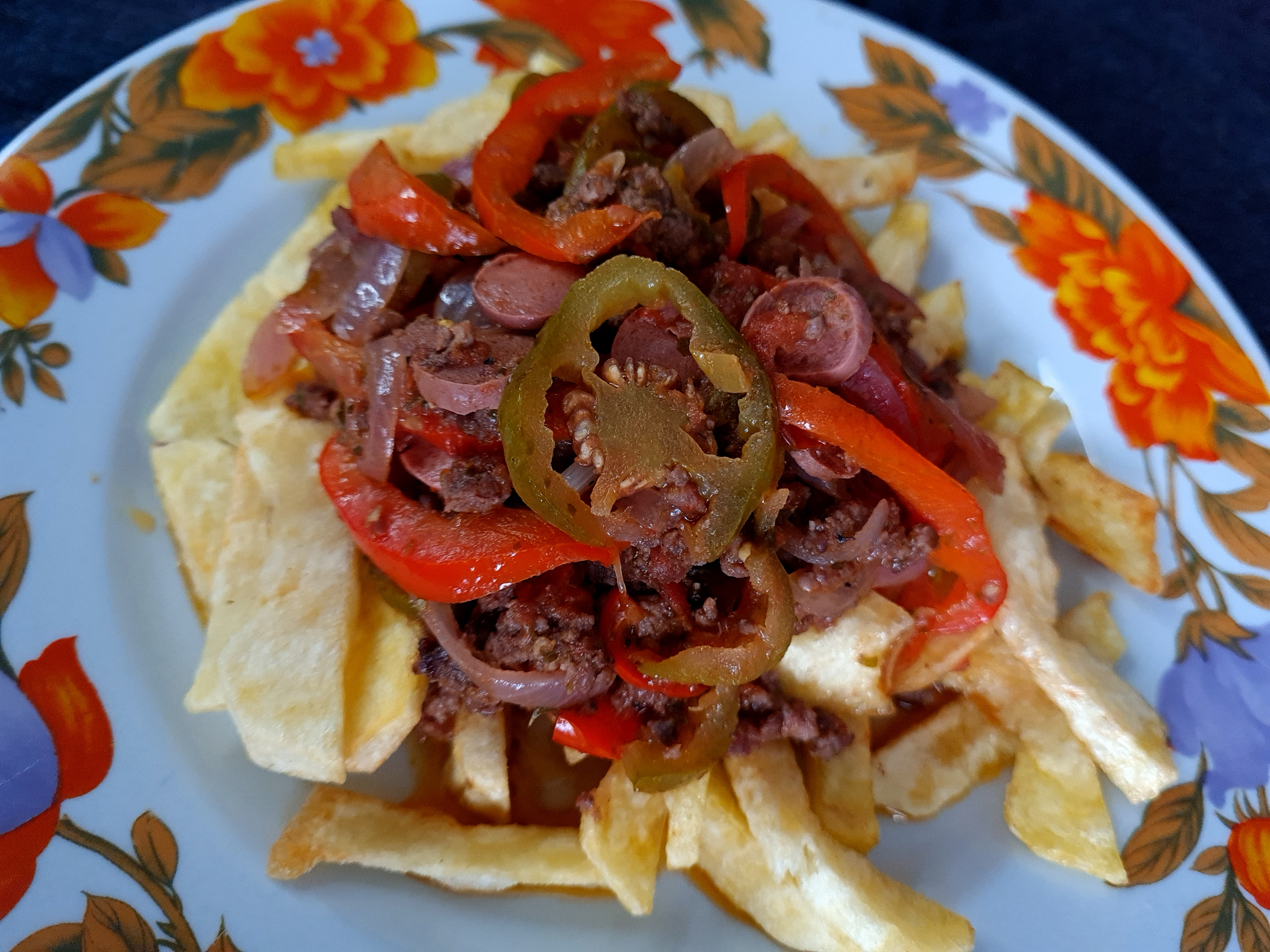
Pique macho, one of the main Bolivian dishes.

Bolivian cuisine is the indigenous cuisine of Bolivia from the Aymara and Inca cuisine traditions, among other Andean and Amazonian groups. Later influences stemmed from Spaniards, Germans, Italians, French, and Arabs Asians due to the arrival of conquistadors and immigrants from those countries. The traditional staples of Bolivian cuisine are corn, potatoes, quinoa and beans. These ingredients have been combined with a number of staples brought by the Spanish, such as rice, wheat, beef, and pork.

Bolivian cuisine differs by geographical locations. In Western Bolivia in the Altiplano, due to the high, cold climate, cuisine tends to use spices, whereas in the lowlands of Bolivia in the more Amazonian regions, dishes consist of products abundant in the region: fruits, vegetables, fish and yuca.

== Influences ==
Bolivian cuisine has been influenced by the Inca cuisine, Aymara cuisine, Spanish cuisine, and to a lesser extent the cuisines of other neighboring countries, like Argentina and Paraguay. European immigration to Bolivia is not as common when compared with other Latin American countries, and while German, Italian, Basque and other cuisines have influenced the cuisine of Bolivia, Spanish cuisine remains the primary influence.

== Foods of Bolivia ==
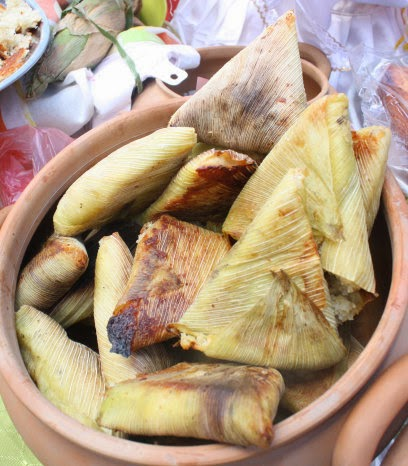
Bolivian tamales

Foods

- Arroz con queso
- Charque
- Ají of noodles
- Saice
- Fricasé
- Pique macho (beef, sausages, onions, peppers, egg and fries topped with sauce)
- Salteñas
- Sopa de maní
- Silpancho

Sauces

- Ají
- Llajwa

Drinks

- Singani
- Yungueño
- Mocochinchi

=== Sweets ===
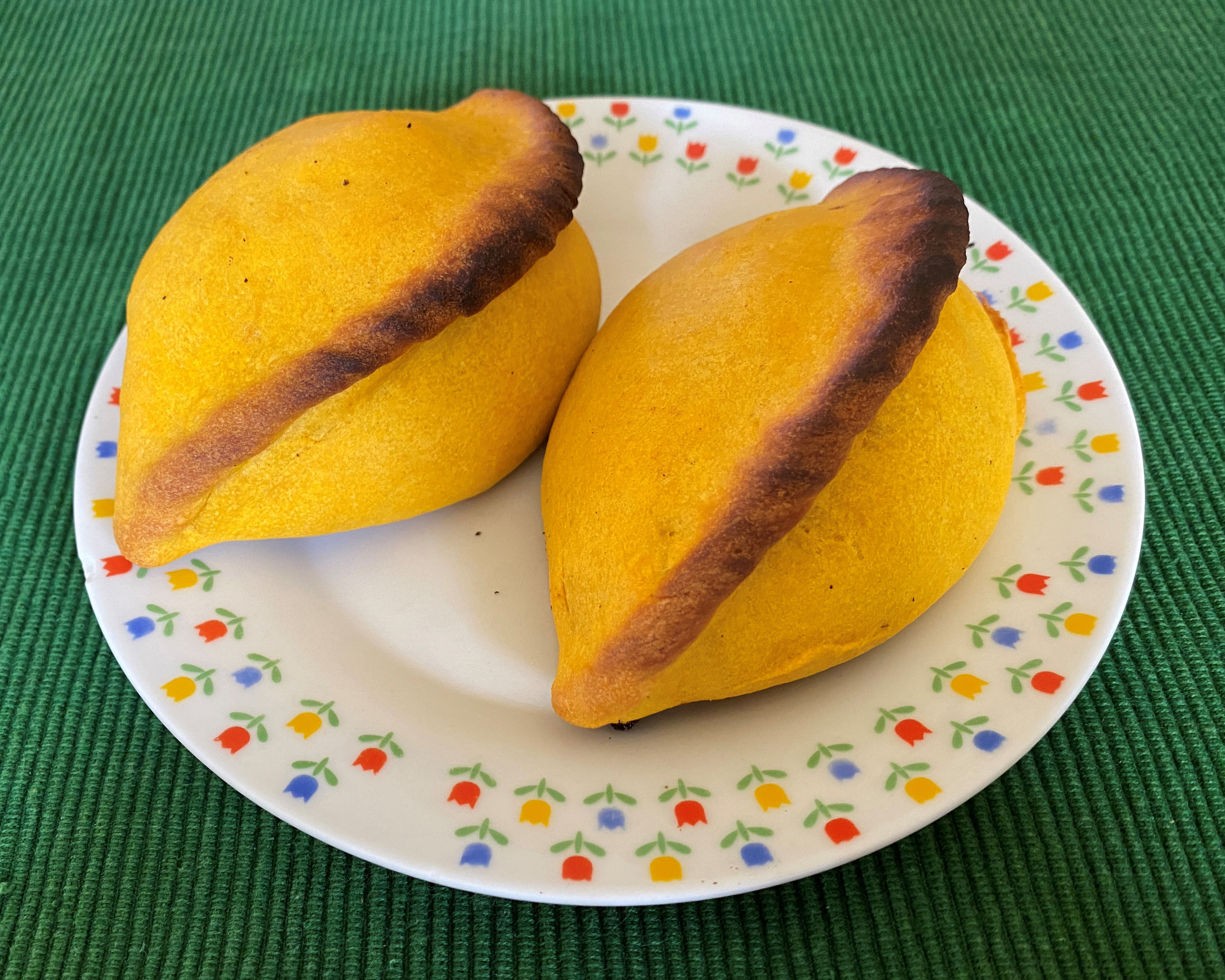
Bolivian salteñas

Sweets in Bolivia use typical sweeteners like honey and sugarcane. Manjar blanco is a common ingredient used as a filling in place of dulche de leche for regional variations of traditional desserts like alfajores. Sweet fruits like bananas, guava, coconut, passion fruit, and raisins are commonly used, especially coconut which features in numerous dessert preparations like cocadas, budín de coco (coconut pudding) and pastelitos.

Some local fruits like the achacha come from the Amazon, while others still are native to the Andes. Known as "custard apple" in English, the cherimoya fruit, believed to be native to the Andes, is commonly used to make ice cream and other sweets. Mark Twain once described the cherimoya as "the most delicious fruit known to men".

Helado de canela is a type of sorbet flavored with cinnamon. Tawa-Tawas are fritter sweetened with miel de caña.

Bunuelos are fried sweet fritters commonly eaten for breakfast with a sweetened beverage called api made with morocho corn, cinnamon, milk and sugar. Another breakfast food is the Andean fruit tamarillo, a common ingredient for compotes, marmalades and assorted desserts.

== Meal structure ==
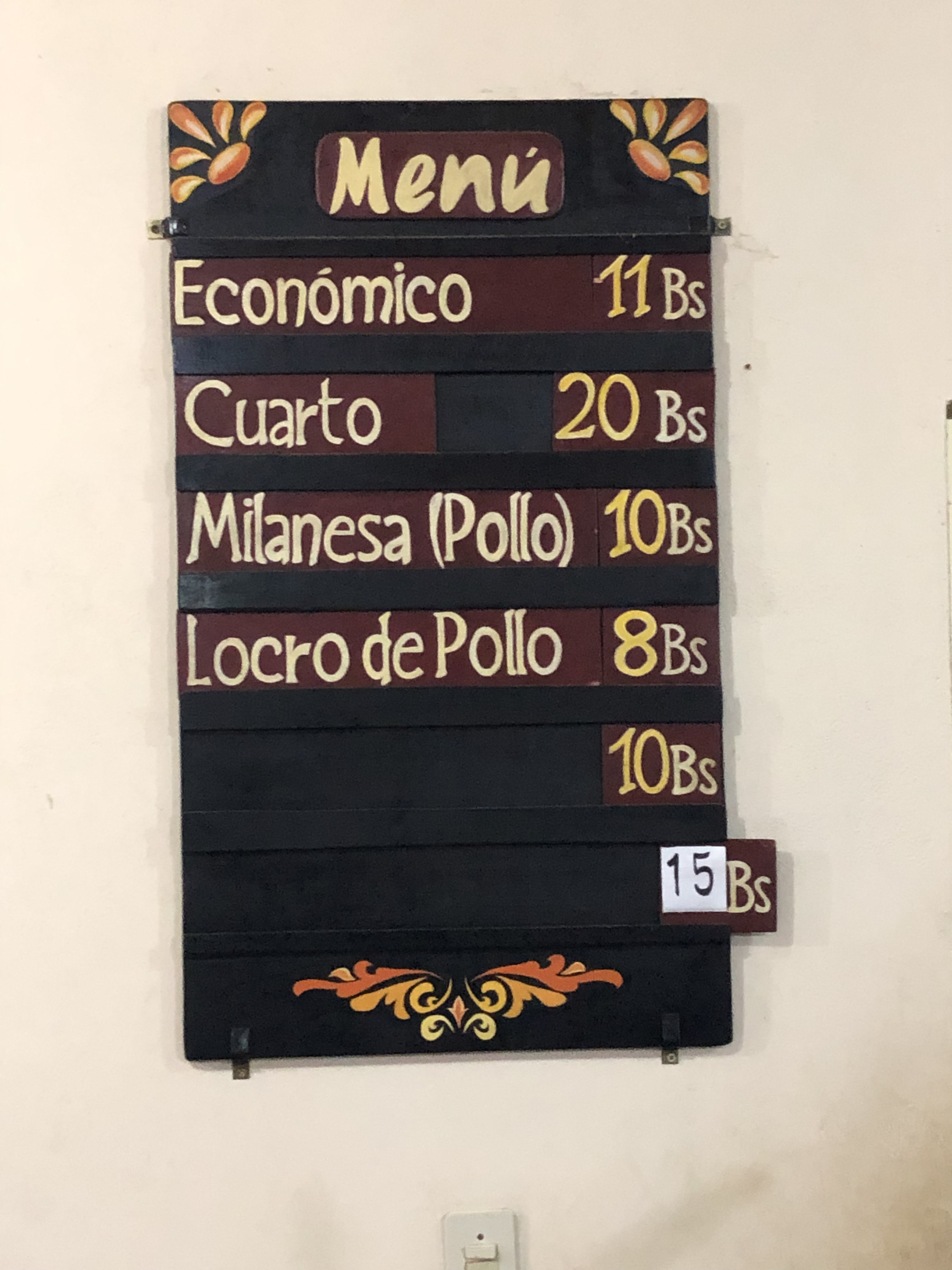
Menu in a typical Bolivian inexpensive restaurant: Económico, Cuarto, Milanesa de Pollo and Locro de Pollo

=== Breakfast (desayuno) ===
Although a Bolivian breakfast can be very rich, most Bolivians start their day simply with a black coffee (cafe tinto) and a piece of bread. A typical Bolivian breakfast is a piece of bread, often a marraqueta, paired with butter and jam.

=== Lunch (almuerzo) ===
Almuerzo is the most important meal of the Bolivian day, so much so that daily life tends to revolve around it. Long lunches are traditional throughout the country, so businesses and shops often close between the hours of 12 and 2 pm, so that the workers have time to return home for lunch. A typical Bolivian lunch would consist of several courses, including a soup, a main course of meat, rice, and potatoes, then a dessert and coffee. Lunch is taken at a leisurely pace and is traditionally followed by a nap, the oft-cited siesta.

=== Tea (té) ===
Bolivians observe an afternoon tea break similar to those in England. Usually the tea breaks take place around 4 and 5 pm at salones de té (tearooms). These tearooms often double as bakeries so that tea and pastries are enjoyed together. Cups of black tea are usually taken with biscuits such as galletas Maria or more traditional humintas. Often, Bolivians drink coca or herb tea when not having black tea.

=== Dinner (cena) ===
Dinner is a lighter, much more informal affair than lunch; it typically takes place at 8 pm or later. It is common to end the day with a traditional Bolivian soup.

== See also ==
- Andean cuisine
- Latin American cuisine
- Bolivian wine
