= Silpancho =

Bolivian rice and meat dish

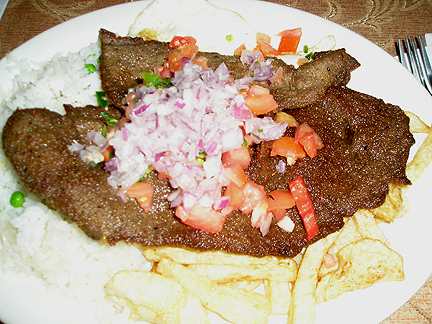

Silpancho (original Quechua word: Sillp'anchu) is a popular Bolivian food from the city of Cochabamba. When prepared properly, this tends to be a large and fulfilling meal with a diversity of carbohydrates and fats. It consists of a base layer of rice, usually white, followed by a layer of boiled and sliced potatoes. Next, a thin layer of breaded, pounded meat is followed by a layer of chopped tomato. In addition, onion, beet and parsley are mixed together and topped with either one or two fried eggs.

Variants including dicing and cooking the meat over the rice cooked instead of remaining in steak form. Another variant is to place pico de gallo on top of the eggs instead of parsley, onion and beets. Another variant marinates the meat using ingredients including soy sauce.

Silpancho can be found in a type of sandwich called "Trancapecho", containing all the ingredients (even rice).

== See also ==
- Milanesa
