= Hominy =

Food item consisting of dried nixtamalized corn

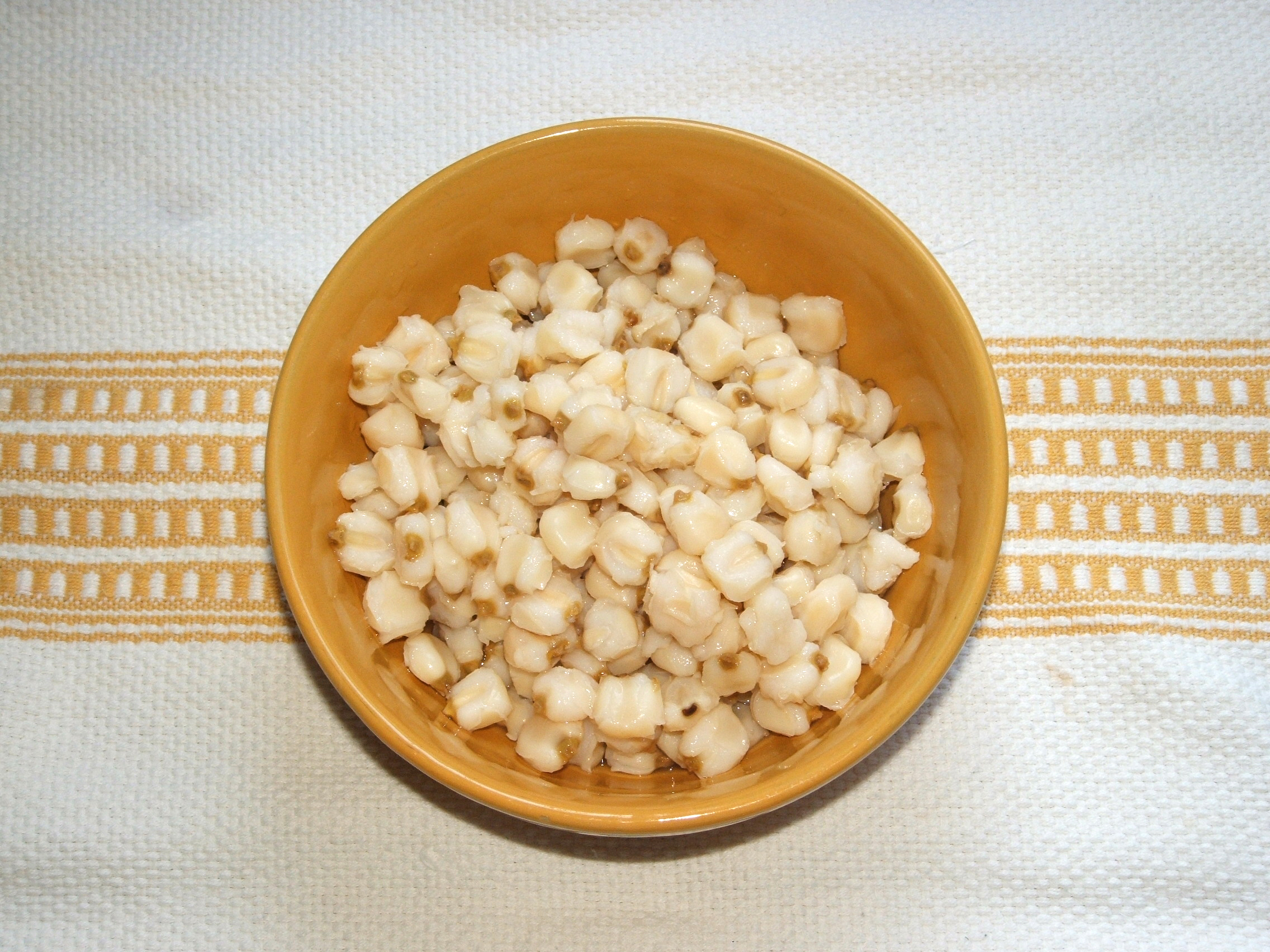
- A bowl of cooked hominy
- Place of origin: Mesoamerica
- Region or state: Americas
- Ingredients generally used: Dried maize (corn) kernels, water, alkali

Hominy (/ˈhɒmɪni/) is a Mesoamerican food produced from dried maize (corn) kernels treated with an alkali, in a process called nixtamalization (nextamalli is the Nahuatl word for "hominy"). "Lye hominy" is hominy made with lye. The word "hominy" comes from the Powhatan -homen, literally, "that treated (in the way specified)."

== History ==
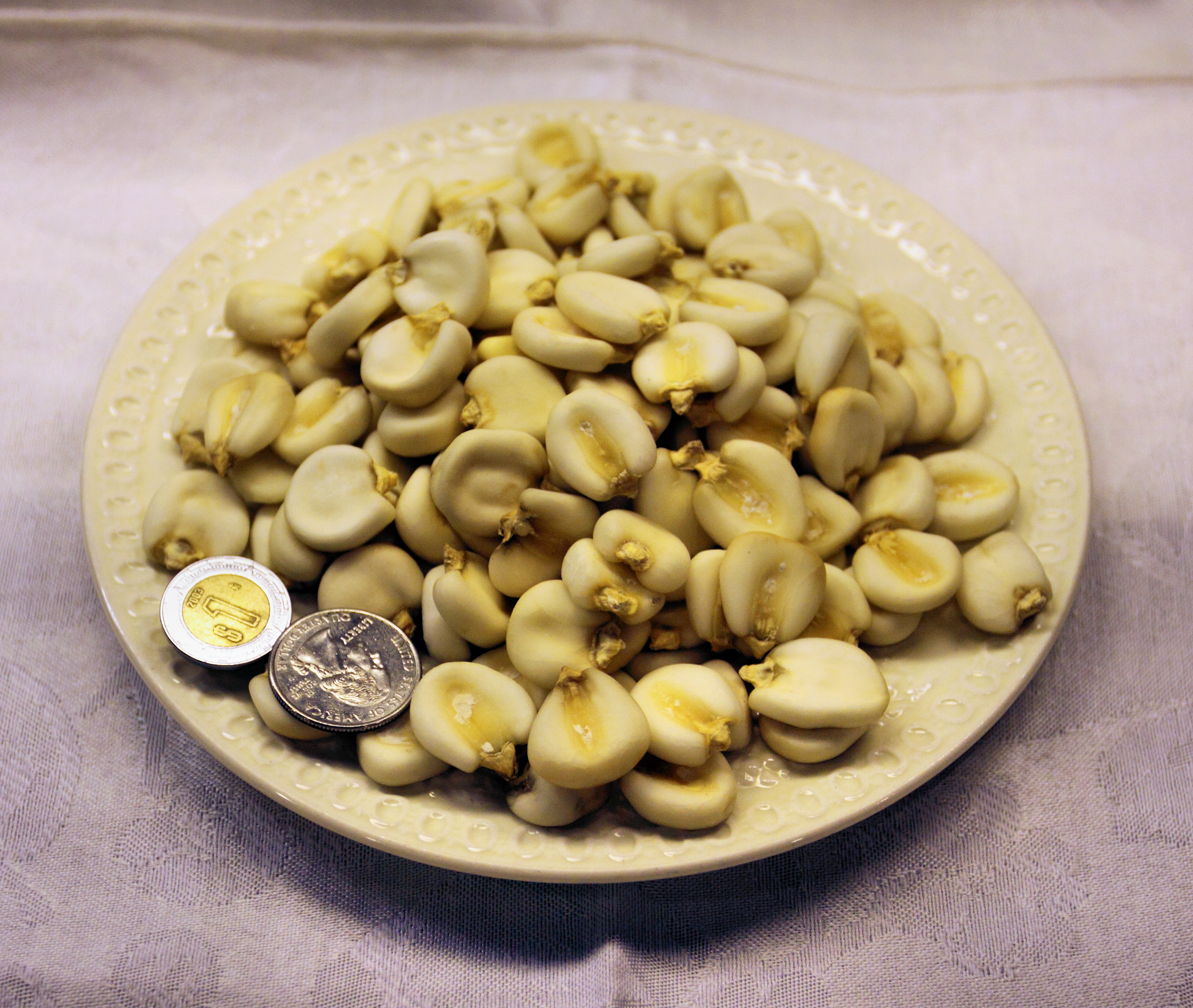
Dried (uncooked form of) hominy. US quarter and Mexican one-peso coins pictured for scale.

The process of nixtamalization has been fundamental to Mesoamerican cuisine since ancient times. The lime used to treat the maize can be obtained from several different materials. Among the Lacandon Maya who inhabited the tropical lowland regions of eastern Chiapas, the caustic powder was obtained by toasting freshwater shells over a fire for several hours. In the highland areas of Chiapas and throughout much of the Yucatán Peninsula, Belize River valley and Petén Basin, limestone was used to make slaked lime for steeping the shelled kernels. The Maya used nixtamal to produce beers that more resembled chicha than pulque. When bacteria were introduced to nixtamal it created a type of sourdough.

The process of nixtamalization spread from Mesoamerica northwards through various indigenous tribes of North America. European settlers first encountered the dish in eastern North America, with the word hominy being an anglicization of the Powhatan word rokahamĕn.

== Production ==
To make hominy, mature dry field corn (maize) is treated by cold-water leaching and cooking the grain in a dilute solution of lye or lime. The alkaline solution dissolves hemicellulose, the major adhesive component of the grain's cell walls, which loosens the hulls from the kernels and softens the corn. Also, soaking the corn in lye or lime kills the seed's germ, which keeps it from sprouting while in storage. Finally, in addition to providing a source of dietary calcium, the lye or lime reacts with the corn so that the nutrient niacin can be assimilated by the digestive tract. People consume hominy in intact kernels or grind it into sand-sized particles for grits or into flour.

In Mexican cuisine, hominy is finely ground to make masa (Spanish for dough). Fresh masa that has been dried and powdered is called masa seca or masa harina. Some of the corn oil breaks down into emulsifying agents (monoglycerides and diglycerides) and facilitates bonding the corn proteins to each other. The divalent calcium in lime acts as a cross-linking agent for protein and polysaccharide acidic side chains. Cornmeal from untreated ground corn cannot form a dough with the addition of water, but the chemical changes in masa (a.k.a. masa nixtamalera) make dough formation possible, for tortillas and other food.

== Recipes ==
In Mexican cuisine, people cook masa nixtamalera with water to make a thick, gruel-like beverage called atole. When they make it with chocolate and sugar, it becomes atole de chocolate. Adding anise and piloncillo to this mix creates champurrado, a popular breakfast drink.

The English term hominy derives from the Powhatan language word for prepared maize (cf. Chickahominy). Many other Indigenous American cultures have also made hominy and integrated it into their diets. The Cherokee, for example, made hominy grits by soaking corn in a weak lye solution produced by leaching hardwood ash with water and then beating it with a kanona (ᎧᏃᎾ), or corn beater. They used grits to make a traditional hominy soup (gvnohenv amagii ᎬᏃᎮᏅ ᎠᎹᎩᎢ) that they let ferment (gvwi sida amagii ᎬᏫ ᏏᏓ ᎠᎹᎩᎢ), cornbread, dumplings (digunvi ᏗᎫᏅᎢ), or, in post-contact times, fried with bacon and green onions.

Hominy recipes include pozole (a Mexican stew of hominy and pork, chicken, or other meat), hominy bread, hominy chili, hog 'n' hominy, casseroles and fried dishes. In Latin America there is a variety of dishes referred to as mote. Hominy can be ground coarsely for grits, or into a fine mash dough (masa) used extensively in Latin American cuisine. Many islands in the West Indies, notably Jamaica, also use hominy (known as cornmeal or polenta, though different from Italian polenta) to make a sort of porridge with corn starch or flour to thicken the mixture and condensed milk, vanilla, and nutmeg. In the Philippines, hominy (made from a local waxy corn cultivar Tagalog: lagkitan) is the main component of dessert binatog.

Rockihominy, a popular trail food in the 19th and early 20th centuries, is dried corn, roasted to a golden brown, then ground to a very coarse meal, almost like hominy grits. Hominy is also used as animal feed.

== Nutrition ==
Hominy, white, canned
Nutritional value per 100 g (3.5 oz)
- Energy: 301 kJ (72 kcal)
- Carbohydrates: 14.3 g
- Sugars: 1.51 g
- Dietary fiber: 2.5 g
- Fat: 0.88 g
- Protein: 1.48 g
Vitamins and minerals
Vitamins	Quantity %DV^{†}
Thiamine (B1)	0% 0.003 mg
Riboflavin (B2)	0% 0.006 mg
Niacin (B3)	0% 0.033 mg
Pantothenic acid (B5)	3% 0.154 mg
Folate (B9)	0% 1 μg
Choline	1% 3.1 mg
Vitamin C	0% 0.3 mg
Minerals	Quantity %DV^{†}
Calcium	1% 10 mg
Copper	3% 0.03 mg
Iron	3% 0.62 mg
Magnesium	4% 16 mg
Manganese	3% 0.07 mg
Phosphorus	3% 35 mg
Potassium	1% 35 mg
Zinc	10% 1.05 mg
- Other constituents: Quantity
- Water: 82.5 g
- Link to USDA Database entry
- ^{†}Percentages estimated using US recommendations for adults, except for potassium, which is estimated based on expert recommendation from the National Academies.

Canned hominy (drained) is composed of 83% water, 14% carbohydrates, 1% protein, and 1% fat (table). In a 100-gram serving, hominy provides 72 calories and is a good source (10–19% of the Daily Value) of zinc. Hominy also supplies dietary fiber. Other nutrients are in low amounts (table).

== See also ==
- Arepa
- Binatog
- List of maize dishes
- Locro
- Pinole
- Popcorn
- Pozole
- Sagamite
