= Plaza de San Francisco =

Plaza de San Francisco (Saint Francis Square) may refer to:

- Plaza San Francisco, La Paz, Bolivia
- Plaza de San Francisco, Quito, Ecuador
- Plaza de San Francisco, Seville, Spain
- Plaza de San Francisco de Asís, Havana, Cuba
