= Santuario Reale della Beata Vergine delle Grazie =

Shrine in Racconigi, Italy

Coordinates: 44°46′06″N 7°40′16″E

The Santuario Reale della Beata Vergine delle Grazie, or Royal Sanctuary of the Blessed Virgin of the Graces, is a Neoclassical-style, Roman Catholic church in Racconigi, Province of Cuneo, region of Piedmont, Italy.

== History ==
A convent of the Carmelite order was located near the banks of the Maira River in 1493, at the site of an apparition of the Virgin Mary that putatively healed a deaf-mute boy. This church was razed during the Napoleonic era. Tradition held that the church housed a copy of the painting of Mary of the Graces by St Luke. In 1835, the neighbourhood of Macra was afflicted with an epidemic of cholera. The painting above was taken to the chapel of St Michael. The plague passed, and the Piedmontese royal family held a service to thank the Virgin for her intervention in stemming the epidemic.

The next year, King Charles Albert of Sardinia patronized the erection of a new church, consecrated in August 1838. The design was by Ernesto Melano, and the structure was referred to as the Small Pantheon (Piccolo Pantheon) reflecting the influence of the Roman temple. The interiors house the following works:

- San Michele painted by Pietro Ayres
- Blessed Umberto III of Savoy painted by Francesco Gonin
- Icon of Mary of the Graces
- Main altar, marble, by Giuseppe Gaggini
- Tombs of the cadet branch of the House of Savoy, the Savoy-Villafranca are buried here.
