= Elssa Paredes =

Bolivian journalist and researcher (1918–2013)

- Born: Elssa Paredes Candia; 20 December 1918; La Paz, Bolivia
- Died: 13 December 2013 (aged 94); La Paz, Bolivia
- Education: Higher University of San Andrés
- Occupations: Journalist; researcher
- Parents: Manuel Rigoberto Paredes Iturri; Haydée Candia Torrico
- Relatives: Paredes family

Elssa Paredes Candia (Note: This name uses Spanish naming customs: the first or paternal surname is Paredes, the second or maternal family name is Candia, and, for married women, the optional marital name is de Salazar.) (20 December 1918 – 13 December 2013) was a Bolivian researcher and multifaceted journalist, promoter of women's organizations, and doll collector.

== Biography ==
=== Early years ===
Elssa Paredes was born in La Paz on 20 December 1918. Her father was the writer Rigoberto Paredes Iturri and her mother was Haydée Candia Torrico. Her siblings were Orestes, Mercedes, and the well-known Antonio Paredes Candia and Rigoberto Paredes Candia. Along with her family, Elssa spent her childhood in the northern area of the city of La Paz, more precisely in a house on Calle Sucre and Junín, in which her parents passed on to the children their passion for art and culture.

She attended the Juana Azurduy de Padilla primary school, Liceo de Señoritas Venezuela secondary school, and the Ayacucho National College. She was admitted to the Higher University of San Andrés and graduated with the title of dental surgeon. She also studied law, politics, journalism, library science, and craft design.

=== Professional life ===
Paredes was the first president of the University Women's Union (Unión Femenina Universitaria; UFU), founded on 14 September 1938, the same year in which she was elected president of the La Paz Student Center of Dentistry. It was the first time that a woman held this position. She was also a delegate of the Faculty of Dentistry to the Local University Federation (Federación Universitaria Local; FUL). On 3 August 1942 she founded, together with others, the University Women's Association of La Paz, of which she was a member for dentistry. From 1958 to 1959, she was president of this association, and managed conferences attended by women professionals.

Paredes was the first vice president of the Pro-School Committee of Journalism, founded on 2 September 1957. She was a member, vice president (1958), and president (1962 and 1963) of the Ladies Committee of the Lions Club of La Paz. In 1958 she founded and was the first president of the Confederation of National Women's Institutions (Confederación de Nacional de Instituciones Femeninas; CONIF). She was a board member of the Women's Center for Hispanic Culture (1959), as well as a member, vice president (1959), and president (1960) of the Ladies Conference of Saint Vincent de Paul. She was on the boards of the Pan American Round Table (1959) and the National Association of Mothers (1960).

In 1960, Paredes founded and was the first president of the National Council of Women of Bolivia. In her administration she created a literacy plan for adult women. She also founded the international institution of Orientation and Protection of Young People. She was a member of La Peña de Escritores y Artistas de La Paz, and secretary of the Committee of the Bolivian Red Cross. In 1971 she founded the Renewal Association of National Studies.

Paredes represented Bolivia at the sixth congress of the Panamerican Medical Women's Alliance in Miami (1958), at the World Health Congress in Little Rock, Arkansas (1958), at the Seminar on the Participation of Women in Public Life in Bogotá (1959), in the meetings of the Organization for Works of Orientation and Protection of Young People in Lima (1959), Buenos Aires (1960), and Rome (1964). She was also part of the 75th anniversary of the International Council of Women in Washington (1963). she was also invited to the Philippines (1979) and Thailand (1981) to present the thesis "Integration of the Peasant Woman".

At the national level, Paredes was part of the Consultative Council of the Honorable City Hall during the administration of mayor Armando Escobar (1975), was elected councilor for La Paz, and was president of the Honorable City Council of La Paz (1986–1987). She was also awarded the Gold Medal granted by the Bolivian Association of Economists "for her noble and well-deserved work in favor of the institution" (1989) and the Prócer Pedro Domingo Murillo Gold Medal in the Palmas de Oro level for her work as president of the Municipal Council (1985–1986).

As a journalist, Paredes taught folklore and culture classes in various cities in the United States. She contributed to journals in Bolivia, Panama, Mexico, Spain, Peru, and Argentina. She worked as a correspondent for La Patria in the city of Oruro and founded the women's magazine Superación. She was the president of Nuestra Revista, a publication which disseminated women's aspirations and called for respect for women's rights.

About Paredes, the professor José María Gutierrez said:

Mrs. Elssa Paredes de Salazar followed courses of Law and Dentistry at the University of La Paz, managing to crown her brilliant studies with the university degree of Surgeon-dentist in National Provision. She studied Political and Social Sciences only to expand her vast culture without being seduced by the hard work of the professional, taking advantage of his intellectual skills at the service of society to vigorously promote institutions of social assistance and dissemination of women's culture, work in which she has undoubtedly achieved full success. However, Dr. Paredes de Salazar has taken special care not only to analyze issues related to the family and society, but has studied historical and legal problems of undeniable importance, demonstrating their capacity and illustration.

== Personal life ==
On 14 March 1943, Elssa Paredes married the United Nations diplomat Hugo Salazar Salmón. Thereafter, she adopted her husband's surname and was renamed Elssa Paredes de Salazar. The couple had four children: Fernando, Jenny, Havier, and Roxana. The latter now runs the Elssa Paredes de Salazar Museum, displaying dolls with typical costumes from Bolivia and the world.

== Works ==
- Presencia de nuestro pueblo
- Diccionario biográfico de la mujer boliviana (1965)
- La mujer y su época (1972)
- Malinche (1998)

== Elssa Paredes de Salazar Museum of Dolls ==
Elssa's penchant for dolls began when she was eight years old. At that time, her mother gave her two dolls: one made by hand, dressed in traditional attire of the Altiplano, and another of European manufacture, made of porcelain. Elssa collected dolls from that moment until the end of her life. Her passion led her to collect more than 800 dolls, although she did not acquire all of them; some were given to her, especially by friends and her husband, who was a diplomat and was constantly traveling. She also created several of them with her own hands and even made them clothes. Currently, her collection is exhibited in the museum in La Paz that bears her name.
