= Antonio Paredes Candia =

Bolivian writers and researchers of Bolivia

José Antonio Paredes Candia (10 July 1924 – 12 December 2004) was a Bolivian writer, folklorist, and researcher who authored over one hundred books on the Bolivian culture. He was widely regarded as an important figure in the preservation and dissemination of Bolivia's cultural identity. His work is characterized by a focus on Bolivian traditions, customs, and folklore.

He is buried in the courtyard of the Museo de Arte Antonio Paredes Candia, a museum in El Alto, Bolivia, named after him.

== Biography ==
=== Early life ===
José Antonio Paredes Candia was born on 10 July 1924, in La Paz, Bolivia. He was the son of Bolivian historian Manuel Rigoberto Paredes Iturri and Haydee Candia Torrico.

He grew up in a home at the intersection of Sucre and Junín in the north of La Paz and had four siblings, including the journalist Elsa Paredes de Salazar.

He attended the Felix Reyes Ortiz High School, where he studied with Raúl Salmón de la Barra, who would later become a pioneer in Bolivian folk theater.

=== Youth ===
At the age of 20, Candia enlisted in the Bolivian military, serving for nearly two years in the "Abaroa Regiment," based in La Paz. His military experience provided him with direct exposure to the realities of everyday life in Bolivia, which later influenced his work and perspective as a writer and researcher.

He had a strong inclination toward teaching, which led him to travel extensively across the country. During the 1940s and 1950s, he would bring bundles of books to teach in several regions of highland mining centers and the south of the country. To accommodate his students' needs, he developed a very simple linguistic style that he used in his books. Candia was aware that his books were written not for the country's intellectual elite, but for lay people who did not read on a regular basis. In one of his reflections, he stated:

I thought and knew that I had to deliver the book into the hands of our people, and that was my goal. For me, the writer is just another laborer in society, not a privileged being who sits on an altar of mud. The writer, more than any other, should convey his thoughts, somehow guiding society. I think there lies the success of my tales for children, because without political propaganda they convey the problems that we should be aware of and the ones we should try to fix.

During his youth, Candia created and toured with a puppet theater, bringing cultural experiences to isolated regions of Bolivia. With puppets, boxes of books, and a few personal belongings, he undertook efforts to promote education and culture in areas with limited access to such resources. During this time, he became affectionately known as "Tío Antonio" (Uncle Antonio), often described as a kind of "Amauta" (a wise teacher figure) bringing literature and learning to forgotten villages.

=== Adulthood ===
As an adult, Candia discovered that Bolivians had an interest in knowing more about their writers, but did not have the means to access them. Because of this, Candia founded the "Street Fair of Popular Culture", during which he went out to sell books on the street. This broke with the image of the bourgeois intellectual writer, making Candia appear a poet of the people. Several writers joined these famous fairs, which are now held permanently in the city of La Paz in a passage called Maria Nunez del Prado.

Candia's dedication to research made him one of Bolivia's most widely read writers, with a bibliography of more than 100 books. He wrote about Bolivian customs, traditions, legends, crafts, and stories, as well as specific investigations. He eschewed sponsorships, grants, and foreign aid, choosing instead to work independently. Candia received several honours, including distinctions from the National Congress of Bolivia, the Order of Marcelo Quiroga Santa Cruz, the Medal of Cultural Merit from the Bolivian government. Candia has schools that are named for him.

In the last years of his life, Candia donated his private art collection to the city of El Alto. The collection was estimated to be worth half a million dollars in Bolivian artworks, sculptures, and archaeological pieces.

== Personal life and Death ==
Candia never married, but adopted the son of a childhood friend, whom he met at his father's ranch.

Museo de Arte Antonio Paredes Candia.

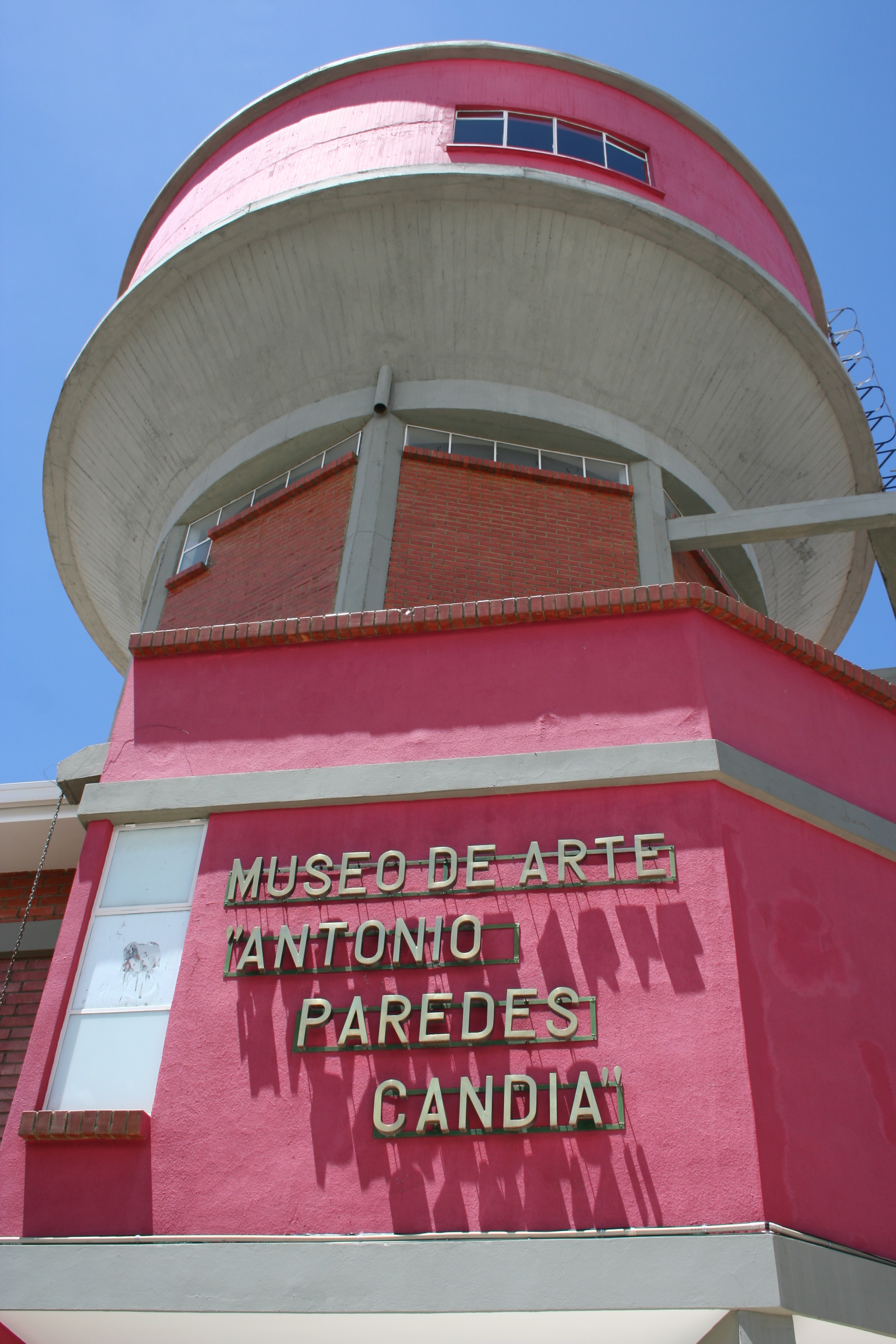
Closeup of the Museo de Arte Antonio Paredes Candia

In 2004, Candia was diagnosed with liver cancer. After being informed that he had not much longer to live, he was taken to a room at the hotel of his younger brother Rigoberto to spend what would be his last weeks. Many people gathered at the hotel to visit him daily. Before his death he was named Doctor Honoris Causa by the Franz Tamayo University of the city of La Paz, followed by several other awards from the authorities of the city.

Candia died on December 12, 2004, in an apartment at the Hotel Victoria located on Sucre Street in the city of La Paz. The apartment was built on the same site as the house in which Candia was born. Candia, who remained lucid until his last seconds, gave precise instructions on the protocol to be followed at his funeral. Among these instructions, he asked to be buried at the gates at the entrance of the museum, in between two layers of lime. On his grave was erected a statue of Candia in his characteristic long coat, scarf, and umbrella, along with the inscription "Dust to dust".

== Legacy ==
Candia's books remain among the most widely read in Bolivia. His books for children are part of the national curriculum in elementary schools. However, nearly 80 percent of his work has fallen out of print.

The people of El Alto constructed a monument to the memory of Candia at the entrance to Ciudad Satélite.

== Selected works ==
- Literatura folklórica
- Los pájaros en los cuentos de nuestro folklore
- El folklore escrito en la ciudad de La Paz
- Folklore en el valle de Cochabamba: el sombrero
- Folklore en el valle de Cochabamba: dos fiestas populares
- Todos santos en Cochabamba
- Comercio popular en la ciudad de La Paz
- Fiestas populares de la ciudad de La Paz
- Folklore de la Hacienda Mollepampa
- Bibliografía del folklore boliviano
- La danza folklórica en Bolivia
- Antología de tradiciones y leyendas. Tomos I, II, III, IV, V
- Artesanías e industrias populares de Bolivia
- Juegos, juguetes y divertimentos del folklore boliviano
- La trágica vida de Ismael Sotomayor y Mogrovejo
- Brujerías, tradiciones y leyendas de Bolivia. Tomo I, II, III, IV, V
- Selección de teatro boliviano para niños
- Vocablos aymaras en el habla popular paceña
- Diccionario mitológico de Bolivia
- Cuentos populares bolivianos
- Adivinanzas de doble sentido
- Adivinanzas bolivianas para niños
- Refranes, frases y expresiones populares de Bolivia
- Fiestas de Bolivia. Tomo I y II
- El apodo en Bolivia
- Voces de trabajo, invocaciones y juramentos populares
- El sexo en el folklore boliviano
- Costumbres matrimoniales indígenas
- De la tradición paceña
- El Zambo salvito
- Kjuchi cuentos
- Once anécdotas del libertador
- Cuentos bolivianos para niños
- Poesía popular boliviana (de la tradición oral)
- Las mejores tradiciones y leyendas de Bolivia
- Folklore de Potosí
- Tradiciones orureñas
- El folklore en la ciudad de La Paz. Dos fiestas populares: el carnaval y la navidad
- Cuadernos del folklore boliviano
- Cuentos de curas
- Otros cuentos de curas
- Anécdotas bolivianas
- Penúltimas anécdotas bolivianas
- Las Alacitas (fiesta popular de la ciudad de La Paz)
- La comida popular boliviana
- Aventuras de dos niños
- Teatro boliviano para niños
- Cuentos de maravilla para niños (de almas, duendes y aparecidos)
- Ellos no tenían zapatos
- Los hijos de la Correista
- El Rutuchi (una costumbre Antigua)
- La historia de Gumercindo
- El molino quemado
- La chola boliviana
- Otras anécdotas bolivianas
- Últimas anécdotas bolivianas
- Leyendas de Bolivia
- Tradiciones de Bolivia
- Brujerías de Bolivia
- Estribillos populares de carácter político
- Literatura oral del Beni
- Diccionario del saber popular. Tomos I y II
- Isolda (la historia de una perrita)
- Doña Fily
- Las muchas caras de mi ciudad
- La bellísima Elena
- El castigo
- Bandoleros, salteadores y raterillos
- De rameras, burdeles y proxenetas
- Juegos tradicionales bolivianos
- La serenata y el adorado pasacalle
- "De profundis clamavi"
- Algunos aperos populares en la vida campesina
- Anécdotas de gobernantes y gobernados
- Letreros, murales y graffitis
- El banquete: su historia y tradición en Bolivia
- Folklore y tradición referente al mundo animal
- Folklorización del cuento Español en la cultura popular boliviana
- Teatro de Guiñol
- Gastronomía nacional y literatura
- La muru imilla
- Mis cuentos para niños
- Tukusiwa o la muerte
- Folklore de Cochabamba
- Lenguaje mímico
- Quehaceres femeninos
