= National Museum of Archaeology =

National Museum of Archaeology or National Archaeology Museum may refer to:

- National Museum of Archaeology, Albania
- National Museum of Archaeology, Bolivia
- National Museum of Archeology, France
- National Museum of Archaeology, Malta
- National Museum of Archaeology, Peru
- National Museum of Archaeology, Poland
- National Archaeology Museum, Portugal

== See also ==
- Museo Nacional de Arqueología y Etnología, Guatemala
- Museo Nacional de Arqueología Antropología e Historia del Perú
- National Archaeological Museum (disambiguation)
