= List of museums in Bolivia =

This is a list of museums in Bolivia.

== Museums in La Paz ==
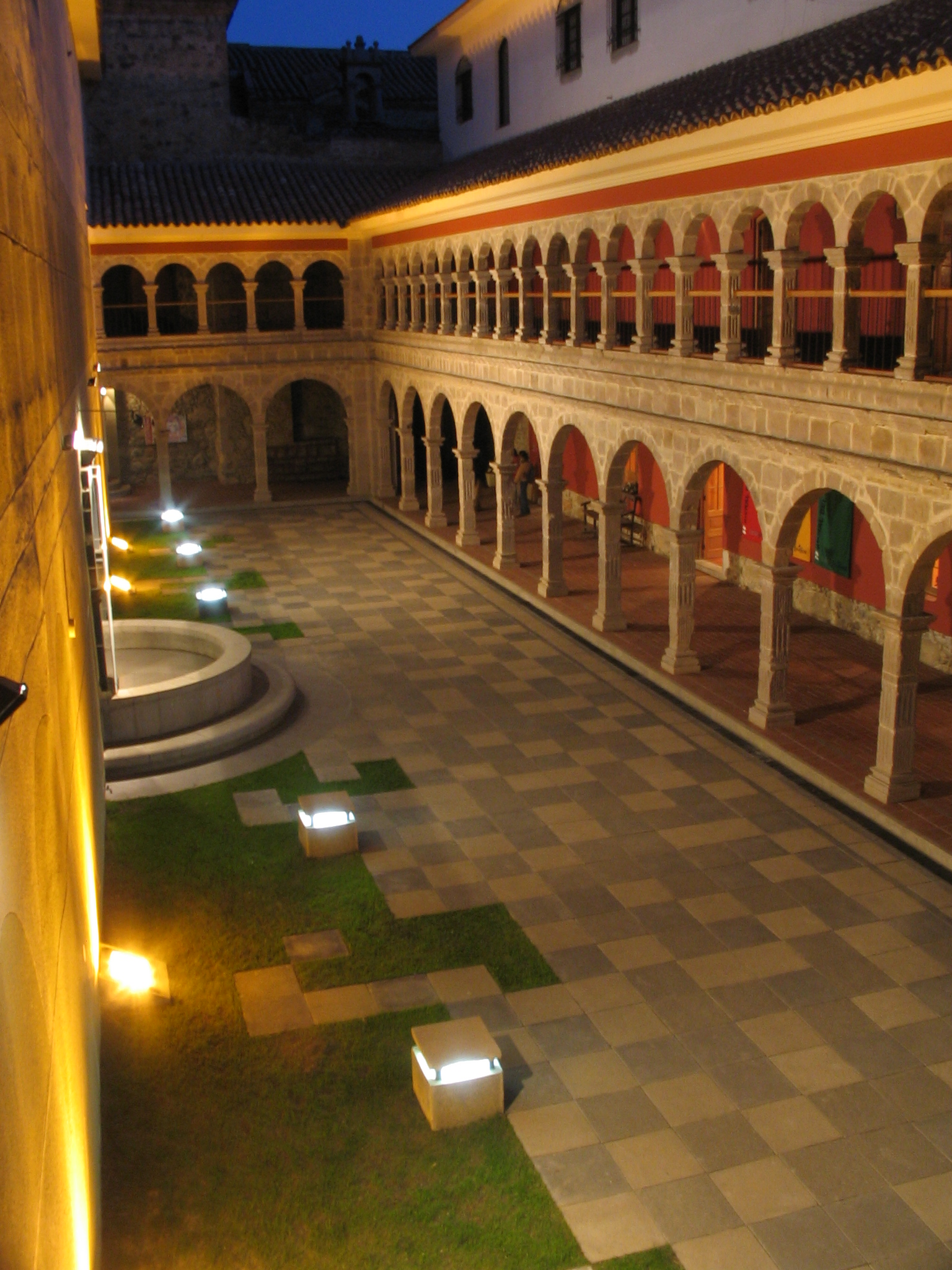
Museo San Francisco Cultural Center

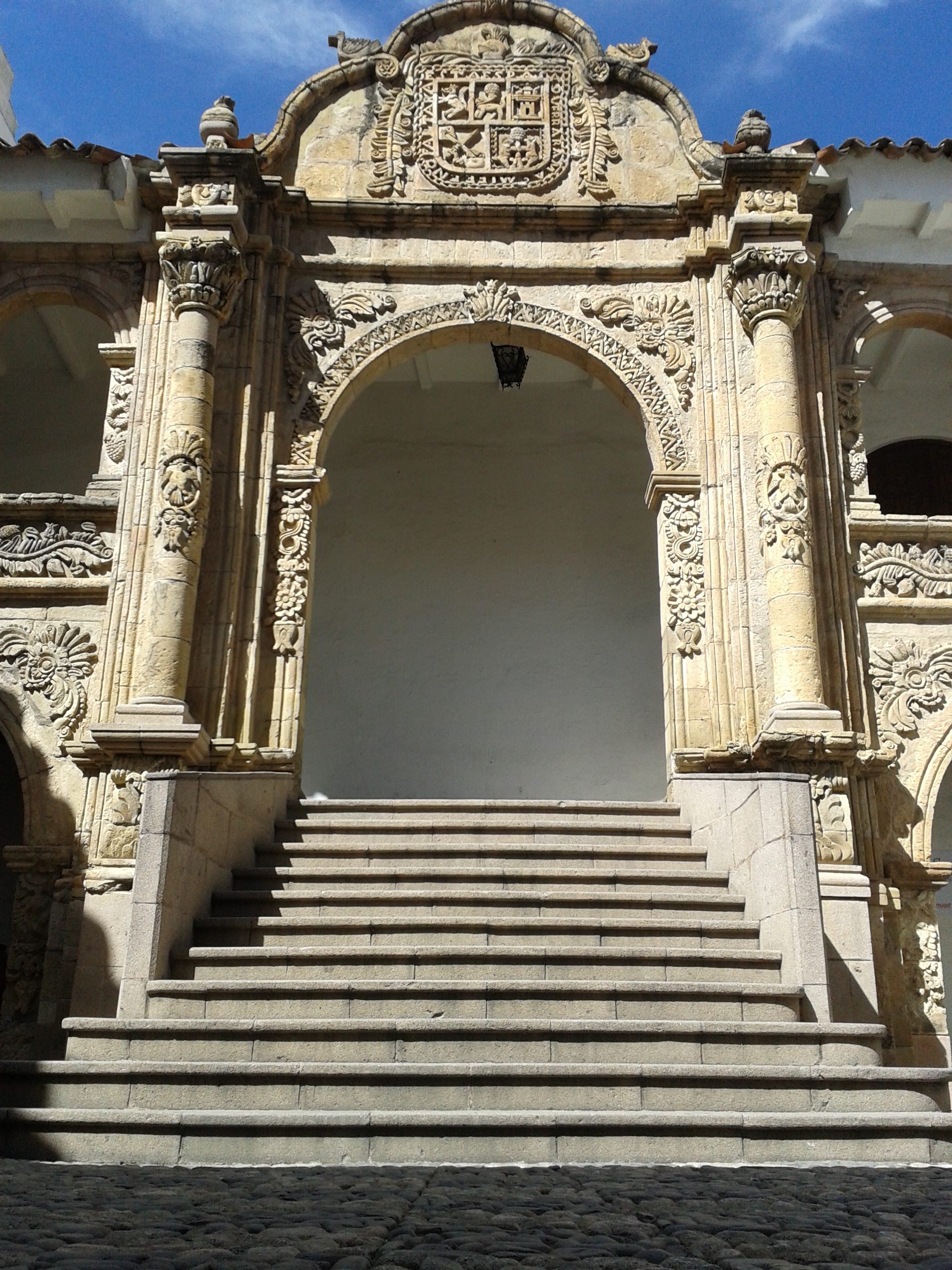
National Museum of Ethnography and Folklore

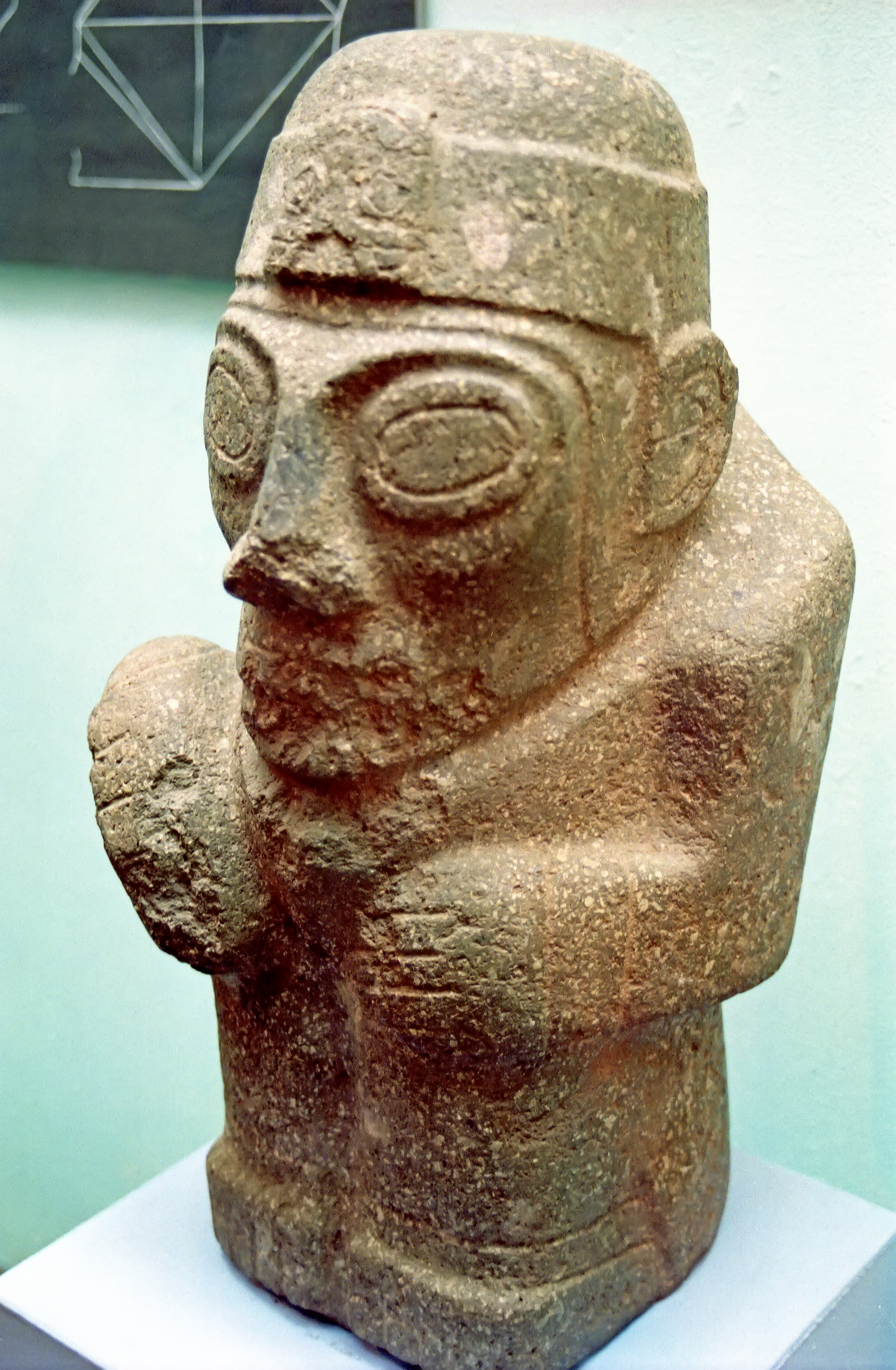
Object in the National Museum of Archaeology

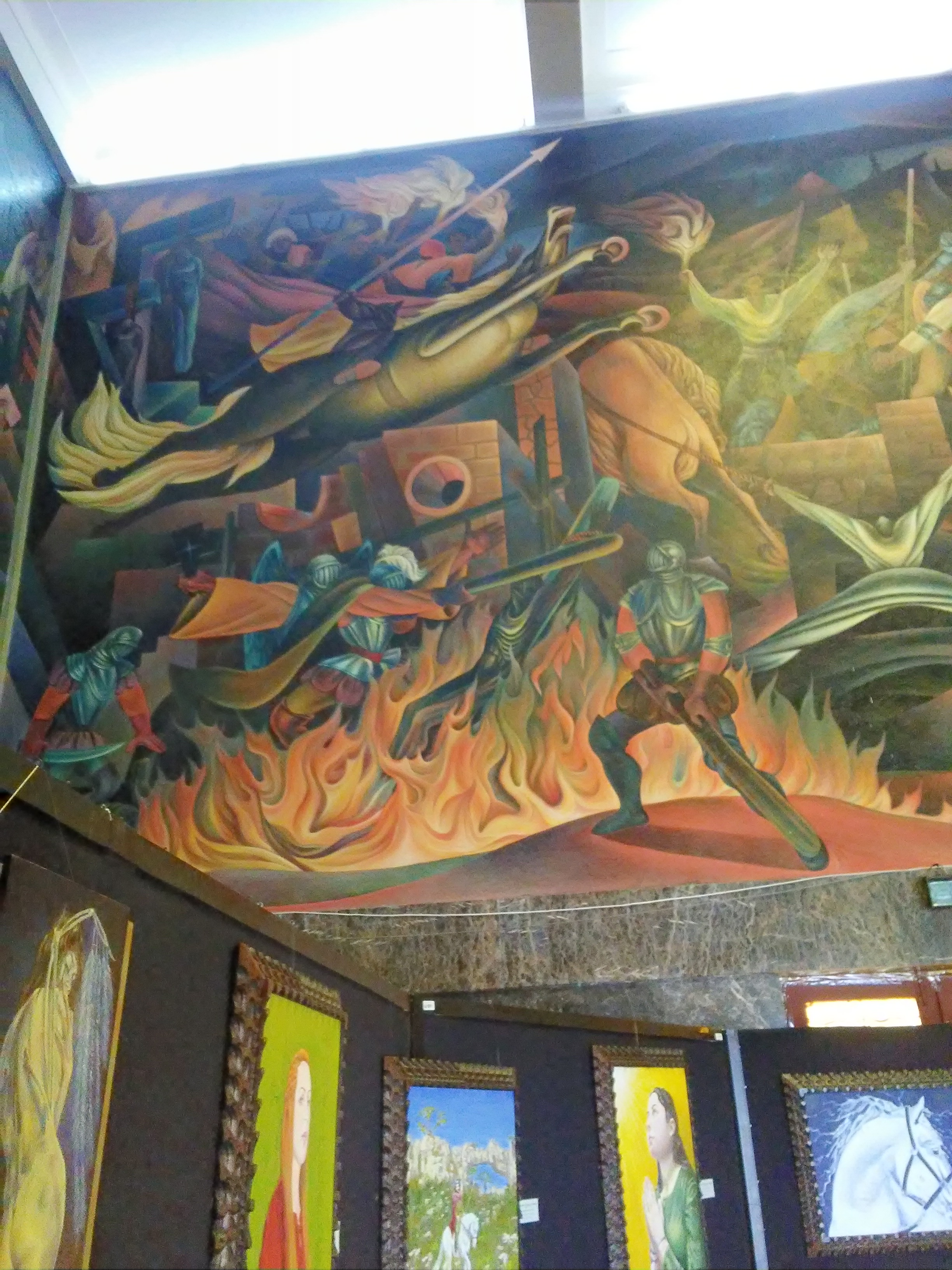
Mural in the Museo de la Revolución Nacional

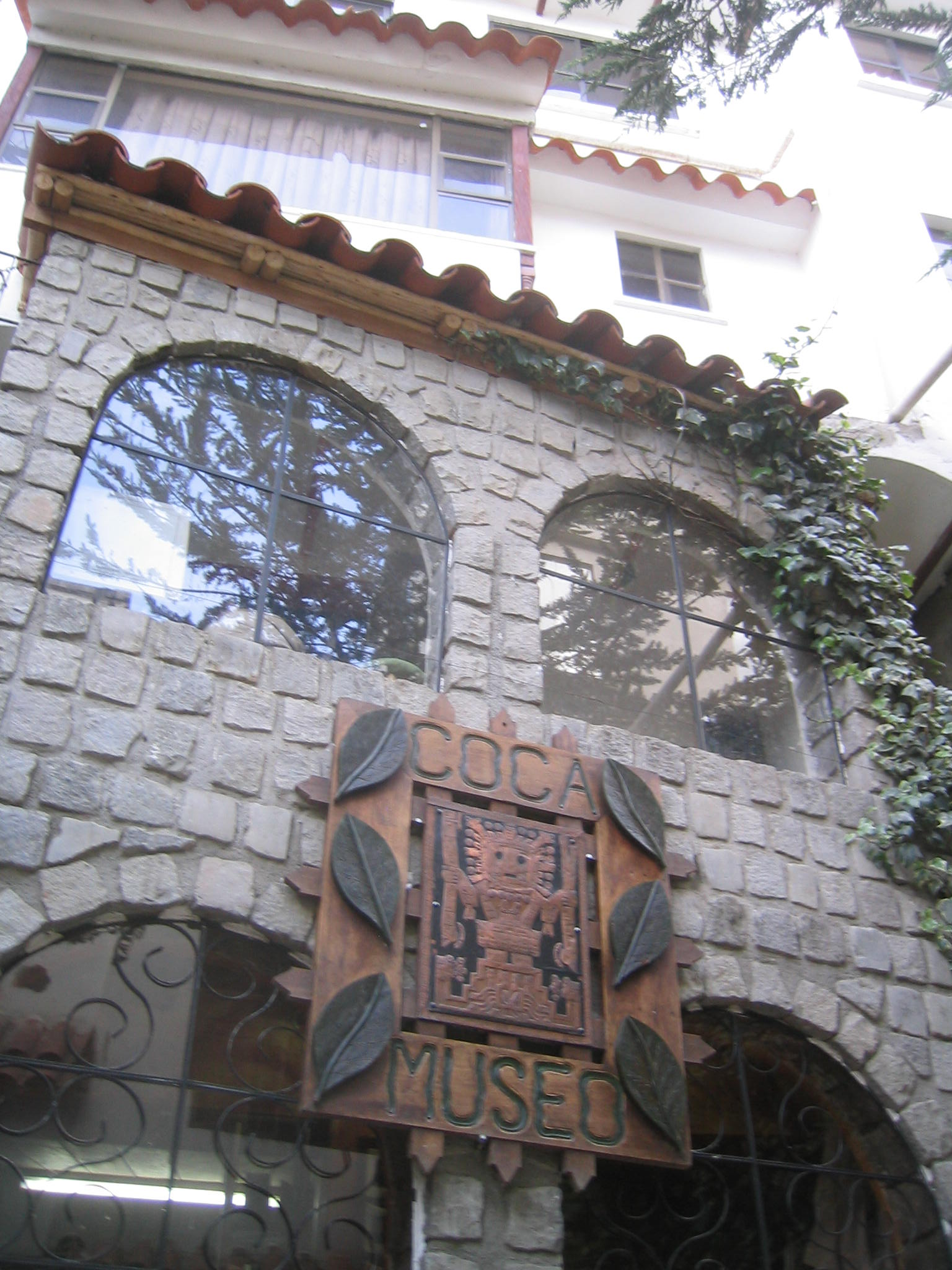
Coca Museum
- National Museum of Archaeology
- National Museum of Ethnography and Folklore
- Museo del Litoral Boliviano
- Museo de la Revolución Nacional
- Museo Tambo Quirquincho
- Casa de Murillo, La Paz
- Museo San Francisco Cultural Center
- National Museum of Art, Bolivia
- Museum of Musical instruments
- Natural History Museum of Bolivia
- Coca Museum
- Museo de Metales Preciosos (Museo del Oro)
- Museo Costumbrista Juan de Vargas
- Bolivian Drink Museum

== Museums in Sucre ==
- House of Liberty Museum
- Military Historical Museum of the Nation
- Enthography and Folklore Museum
- Museum of Indigenous art ASUR
- Para Ti Chocolate Museum

== Museums in Cochabamba ==
- Museo Arqueologico de la Universidad (UMSS)
- Museo & Convento de Santa Teresa
- Casona de Mayorazgo (Lifestyle Museum & Heritage Mansion)
- Museo Villa Albina

== Museums in other cities ==
- National Mint of Bolivia, Potosí (Casa de la Moneda de Bolivia)
- Tiwanaku Site Museum
- Art Museum of Antonio Paredes Candia, El Alto
- Museo del Litoral (Museo de la Guerra del Pacífico)
- Democratic and Cultural Revolution Museum, Orinoca
- Bolivian Air Force Museum, El Alto
- Machacamarca Railway Museum, Machacamarca (Oruro) (Museo Ferroviario Machacamarca)

== See also ==
- List of archives in Bolivia
- List of museums by country
- Spanish Wikipedia
