= Ignacia Zeballos Taborga =

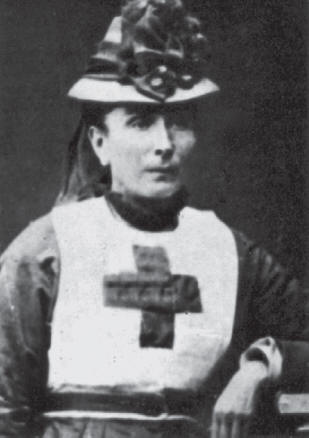
- Born: 27 June 1831; La Enconada, Santa Cruz, Bolivia
- Died: 5 September 1904 (aged 73); La Paz, Bolivia
- Occupations: seamstress, grocer, military nurse

Ignacia Zeballos Taborga (27 June 1831 – 5 September 1904) was a Bolivian seamstress and grocer who enlisted in the Army during the War of the Pacific. After serving ten months in the regular army, she transferred to the Army Ambulance service, a precursor to the Bolivian Red Cross. She earned the distinction as the "Mother of the Bolivian Soldier" for her care of the wounded and was honored as the Meritorious Heroine of the Homeland. Numerous monuments and awards throughout the country are named in her honor.

== Early life ==
Ignacia Zeballos Taborga was born on 27 June 1831 in La Enconada, (now known as Warnes, in the Santa Cruz Department), Bolivia to Antonia Taborga and Pedro Zeballos. She was one of three siblings, having a brother, Daniel and a sister, Matilde and was twice widowed, giving birth to a daughter by her second husband, Blan (or Blanco).

== Career ==
After the death of her second husband, Zeballos moved to La Paz, where she worked as a seamstress. In 1876, during the coups d'état led by Hilarión Daza to oust President Tomás Frías, she participated in the burning of Palacio Quemado and then fled to the Bolivian coast, where she established a grocery. At the onset of the War of the Pacific, she was living in Puno with her daughter, but returned to La Paz after Chilean invasion of the Port of Antofagasta in 1879. In La Paz, she learned of the government's instruction to collect armaments and ammunition to defend the country. Wearing the uniform of her deceased husband, Zeballos joined the Colorados Battalion of the Eastern Rifles (Spanish: Rifleros del Oriente) of Velasco Squadron and rode on horseback with the troops to Tacna.

Participating in the Battle of Tacna, and the excursions at Ite and Moquegua, Zeballos served in the Army for ten months, helping the camp followers—known as rabonas, who provided nursing services, carried arms and munitions for soldiers, and gathered intelligence which could assist the military—and soldiers, for whom she served as a rifle loader. After ten months of serving with no pay, General Eliodoro Camacho awarded pay of thirty bolivianos (Bs) to Zeballos and when he promoted her to the Ambulances of the Army (Spanish: Ambulancias del Ejército) her pay increased to thirty-two Bs. per month. She was one of the first nurses to wear the emblem of the Red Cross into battle. In September 1880, having served for eighteen months, Zeballos wrote a letter to President Narciso Campero begging leave to return to Puno to check on her young daughter and asking for her back pay.

Her service was distinguished by her care of the wounded, but also her attention to caring for the children of the rabonas. She also wandered the battlefield after the combatants had ceased fighting looking for the wounded to protect them from the Chilean forces who routinely reviewed the fallen looking to slit the throats of any survivors. When the war ended, the Bolivian National Convention of 1880 declared Zeballos as the Meritorious Heroine of the Homeland (Spanish: Heroína Benemérita de la Patria), bestowed upon her the honorific title of Colonel of Health, and awarded her a gold medal with a lifetime pension of forty Bs. per month.

== Death and legacy ==
Zeballos died on 5 September 1904 in La Paz and was buried with military honors in the Pantheon of Nobles of La Paz. In 1948, President Enrique Hertzog named the National School of Nurses in her honor. In 1982, her remains were re-interred at a monument dedicated in her honor near Warnes, located at a northern roundabout on the highway to Montero. When the transfer of her remains was approved, the Bolivian Armed Forced declared her to be the "Mother of the Bolivian Soldier". In 2016 the government of Yapacaní created an award for the highest distinction of merit in health service or research which bears her name.
