= Giuseppe Gaggini =

Italian sculptor

The subject of this article is different to sculptor Giuseppe Gagini of Palermo, Sicily, who died in 1610

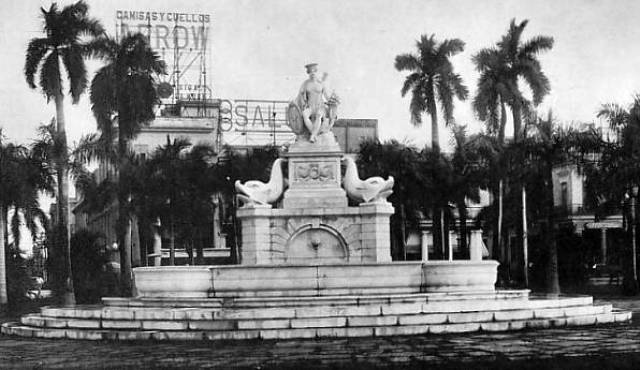
Fuente de la India. Havana, Cuba. 1837

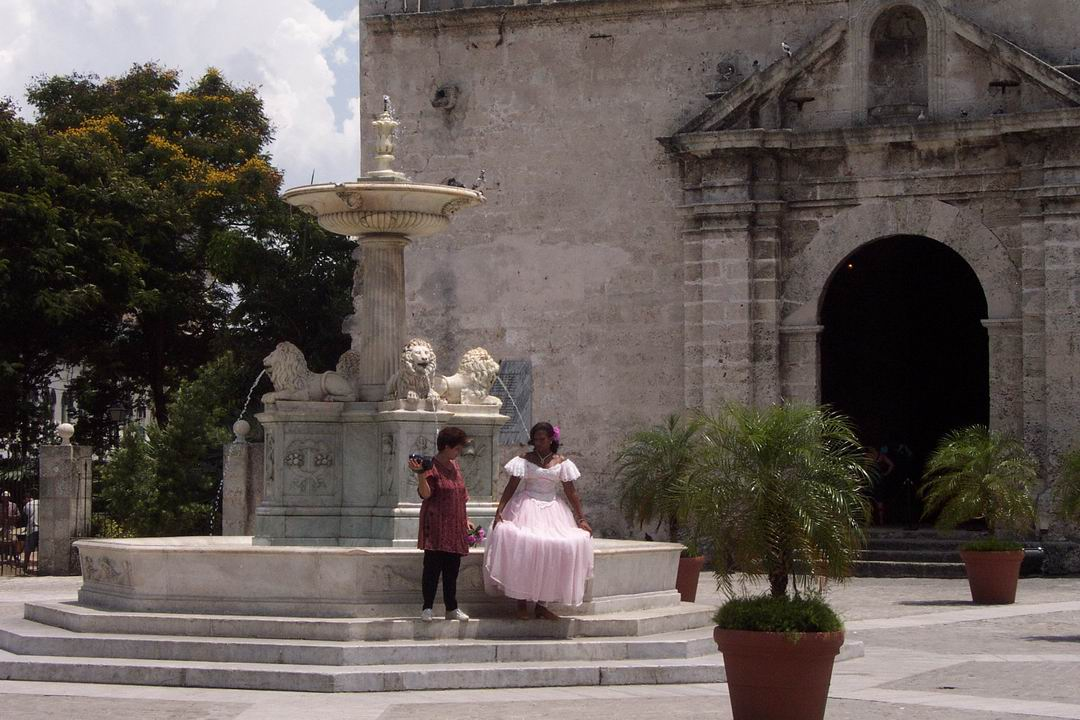
Fuente de los Leones, in Plaza de San Francisco of Havana was built by Italian sculptor Giuseppe Gaggini, was installed in 1836, the photo of 2003

Giuseppe Gaggini (Genoa, April 25, 1791 – May 1, 1867) was an Italian sculptor.

== Biography ==
He gained a stipend from the Ligurian government to study in Rome. There he was influenced by the Neoclassical sculptors Canova and Thorvaldsen. He returned to Genoa, where he was appointed professor of sculpture at the Academy. Subsequently, Charles Albert of Savoy lured him to Turin with a grant of knighthood and a position as professor of sculpture in the Accademia Albertina.

In Genoa, he completed the statues of Angels in the Duomo; made a nautical statue for public decoration, and the bas-relief for the monument to Christopher Columbus. he also completed the monument to the Balduino family for the Camposanto of Genoa.

In Piedmont, he completed a bas-relief of the Triumph of Paolo Emilio for the Castle of Racconigi; a statue of Vittorio Emanuele I; a monument to Prince Tommaso for the Sindone Chapel; a monument to Marchese Felice di San Tommaso; a marble altar for the Santuario Reale della Beata Vergine delle Grazie; and a burial monument for the Solei family in the Camposanto of Turin.
