= National Archaeological Museum =

National Archaeological Museum may refer to:

- National Archaeological Museum of Korçë, Albania
- National Archaeological Museum, Bulgaria
- National Archaeological Museum, France
- National Archaeological Museum, Athens, Greece
- National Archaeological Museum, Cagliari, Italy
- National Archaeological Museum, Florence, Italy
- National Archaeological Museum, Naples, Italy
- National Archaeological Museum of Paestum, Italy
- National Archaeological Museum, Madrid, Spain

== See also ==
- Museo Nazionale della Magna Grecia (National Archaeological Museum of Magna Græcia), Reggio Calabria, Italy
- National Museum of Archaeology (disambiguation), includes uses of "National Archaeology Museum"
