= Coca Museum =

Museum in La Paz, Bolivia

Coordinates: 16.4977°S 68.1382°W

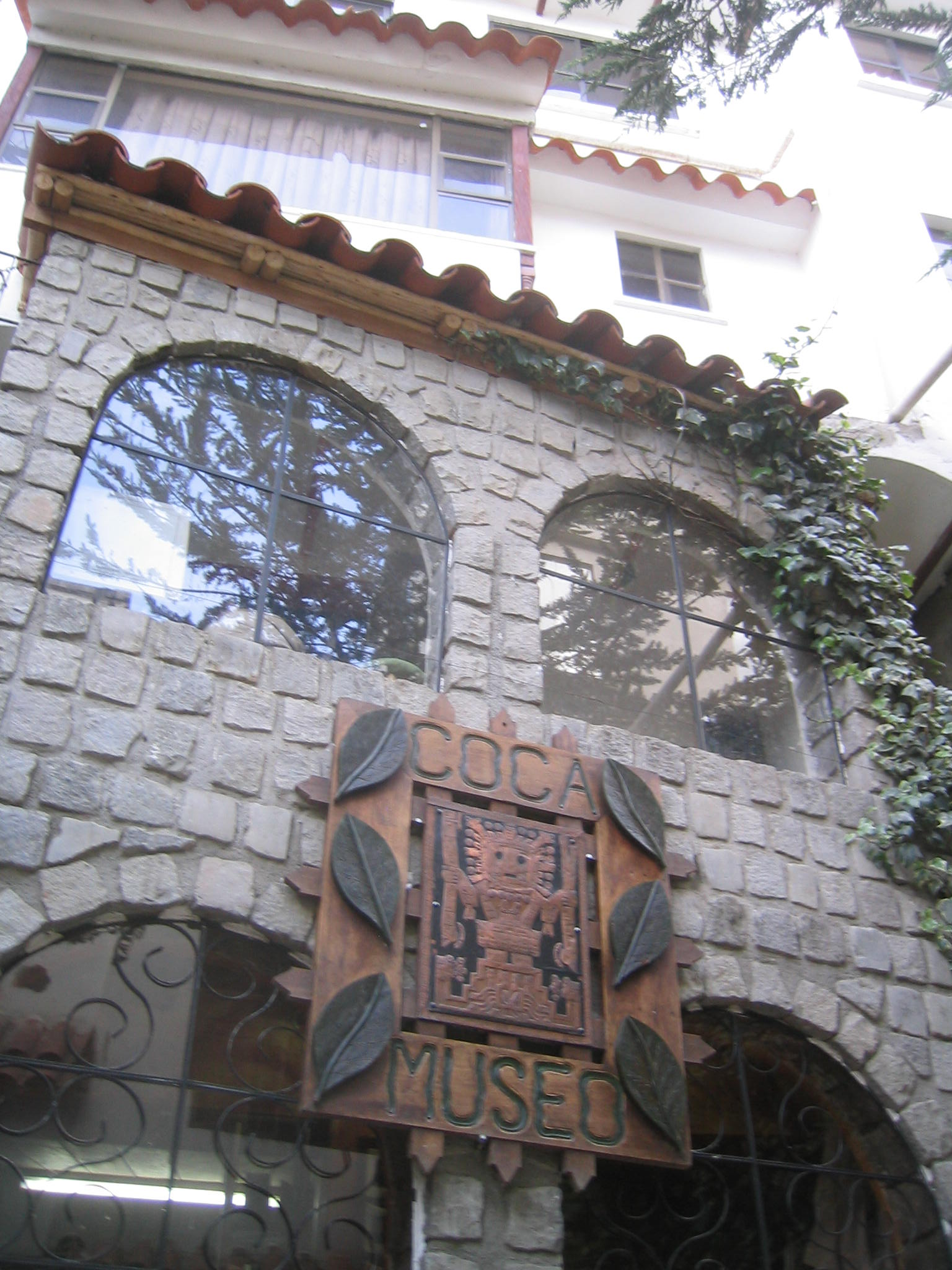
The Coca Museum, Bolivia.

The Coca Museum (in Spanish, Museo de la Coca) is a museum located on Calle Linares in La Paz, Bolivia. It covers the history of the coca plant from the Andean region and related drug cocaine. The museum is associated with the International Coca Research Institute (ICORI), which is based in Amsterdam, with both having been founded in 1996 by renowned Bolivian scientist Jorge Hurtado.

== Collections ==
The museum displays a history of the coca leaf, teaching visitors about its variety of uses. While it is known primarily to most as the ingredient used in cocaine, it also plays a key role in Andean religious ceremonies, is known to have healing properties, and has been used by soft drink companies and in the pharmaceutical industry. The museum also teaches about the chemical breakdown of the plant, the variety of species available, and how the plant is used to make cocaine. The museum is in part a traditional museum, but also houses a replica cocaine lab. The museum features several interactive exhibits, including allowing visitors the opportunity to chew coca leaves, and a shop and cafe which give the opportunity to purchase coca tea, and coca distilled alcohol. The museum tells the story of how coca and cocaine production evolved into a widescale problematic industry in the United States, and addresses the social and political issues surrounding legal coca production in Bolivia. Museum founder Hurtado died in 2021.

== See also ==
- List of museums in Bolivia
