= List of archives in Bolivia =

This is list of archives in Bolivia.

== Archives in Bolivia ==
- National Archive and Library of Bolivia
- Archivo Central de la Prefectura del Departamento de Santa Cruz
- Archivo de la Ciudad de la Paz
- Archivo del Instituto Nacional de Estadistica
- Archivo del Instituto Nacional de Reforma Agraria
- Archivo Franciscano de Tarija

== See also ==
- List of archives
- List of museums in Bolivia
- Culture of Bolivia
