= Basilica of San Francisco, La Paz =

Church in La Paz, Bolivia

Basilica of San Francisco
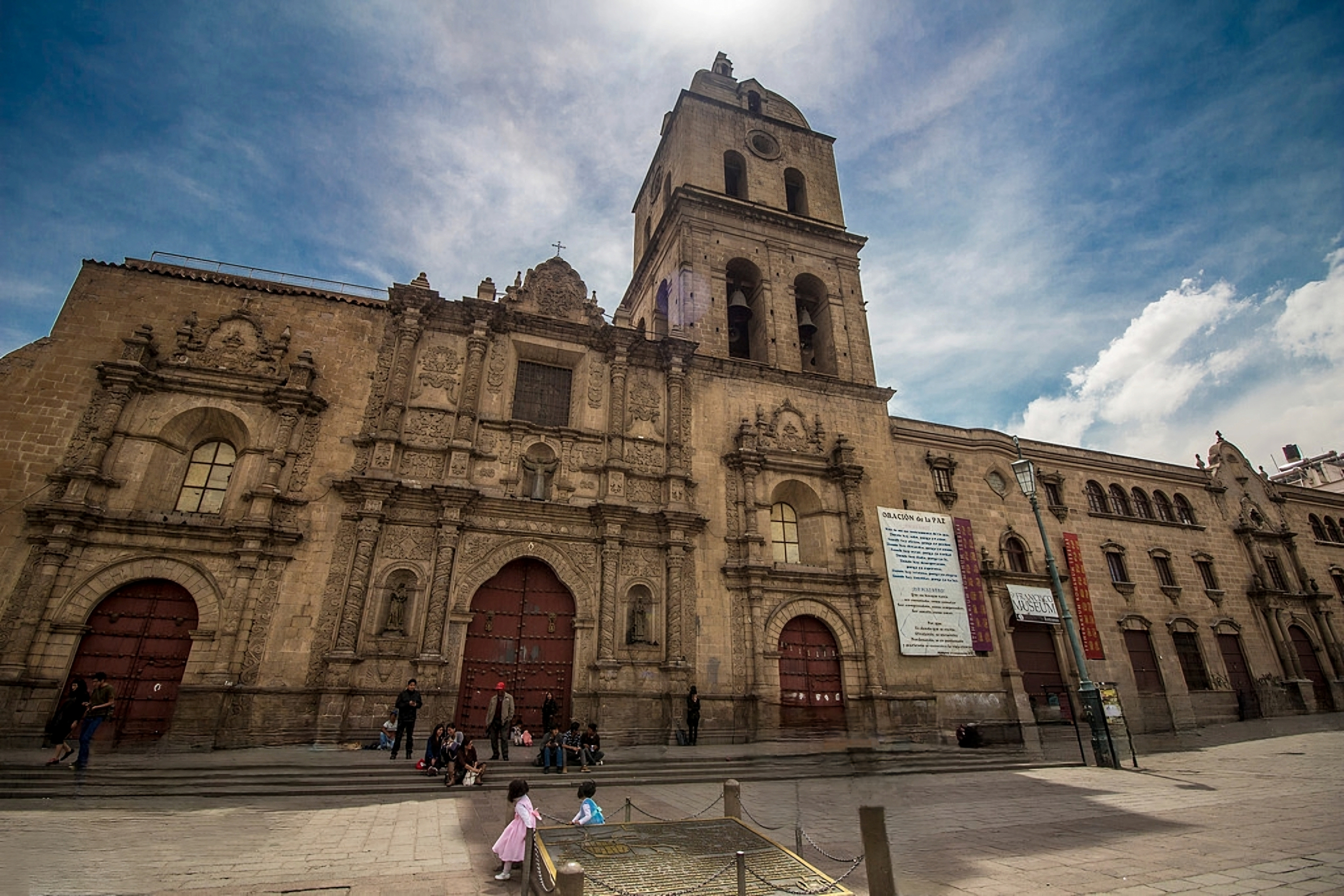
- Basilica of San Francisco
- 16°29′47″S 68°08′14″W
- Location: La Paz, Bolivia
- Country: Bolivia
- Denomination: Catholic Church
- Website: www.museosanfranciscobolivia.com

History
- Founded: 1549
- Dedication: Francis of Assisi

Architecture
- Architectural type: Andean Baroque
- Groundbreaking: 1743
- Completed: 1885

Administration
- Division: Archdiocese of La Paz

The Basilica of San Francisco in the city of La Paz, Bolivia, is a Catholic church under the advocation of Francis of Assisi. It is located in the center of the city, in the square that bears its name, Plaza San Francisco.

The building was built between 1743 and 1772 but its tower was built in the end of the 19th century.

== History ==
It was built between the sixteenth and eighteenth centuries in the so-called Andean Baroque style. Milestones in its history include:

- In 1548, the Convent of San Francisco was founded along the Choqueyapu River by Fray Francisco de Morales.
- In August 1549 the construction of the first Church of San Francisco began, which was concluded in 1581.
- Between 1608 and 1612 the first church collapsed as a result of a snowfall of considerable proportions.
- Between 1743 and 1744 the construction of the present church began.
- In 1753, the closure and the roof of the church's dome were completed.
- On April 23, 1758, it was consecrated.
- In 1790, the carved façade is finished.
- In 1885, the construction of its single tower began.
- In 1948, it was declared a minor basilica.
- Between 1950 and 1960, part of the convent was demolished.
- Since 1965, the church houses a museum.

== Sources ==
- ÁLVAREZ LÓPEZ, Rolando. CRONOLOGÍA de SEPTIEMBRE y OCTUBRE de 2010. Rev. Fuent. Cong., oct. 2010, vol.4, no.10, p. 76-80. ISSN 1997-4485. Consulted in www.revistasbolivianas.org.bo, in June, 2013.
- Iglesias mostrarán su patrimonio arquitectónico en la “Noche Blanca”, published in El Diario, October, 19 of 2012, consulted in www.eldiario.net, in June, 2013.
- Centro cultural Museo San Francisco, Official Web Site https://web.archive.org/web/20140102073422/http://www.museosanfranciscobolivia.com/

== Image gallery ==
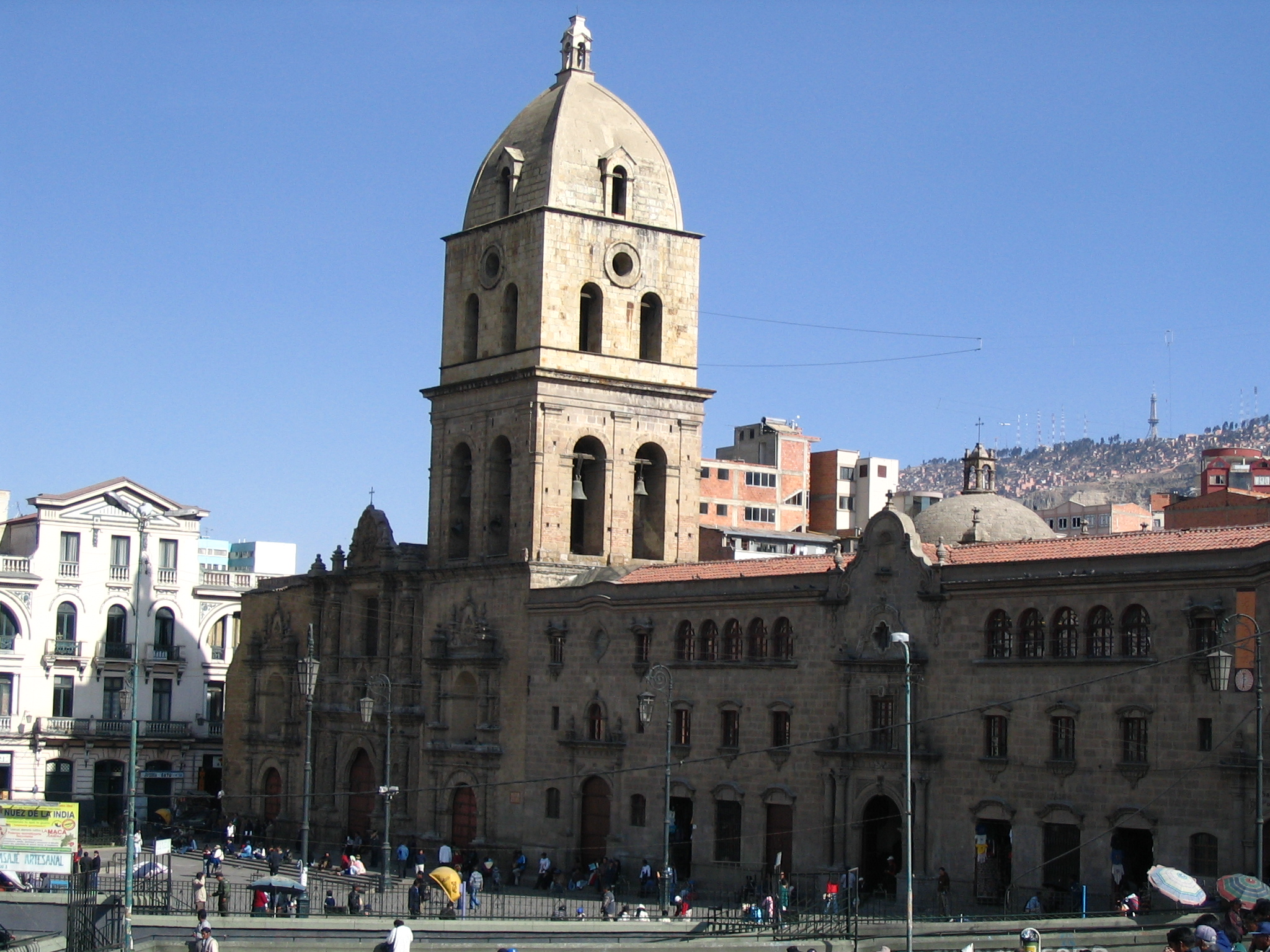
The façade.

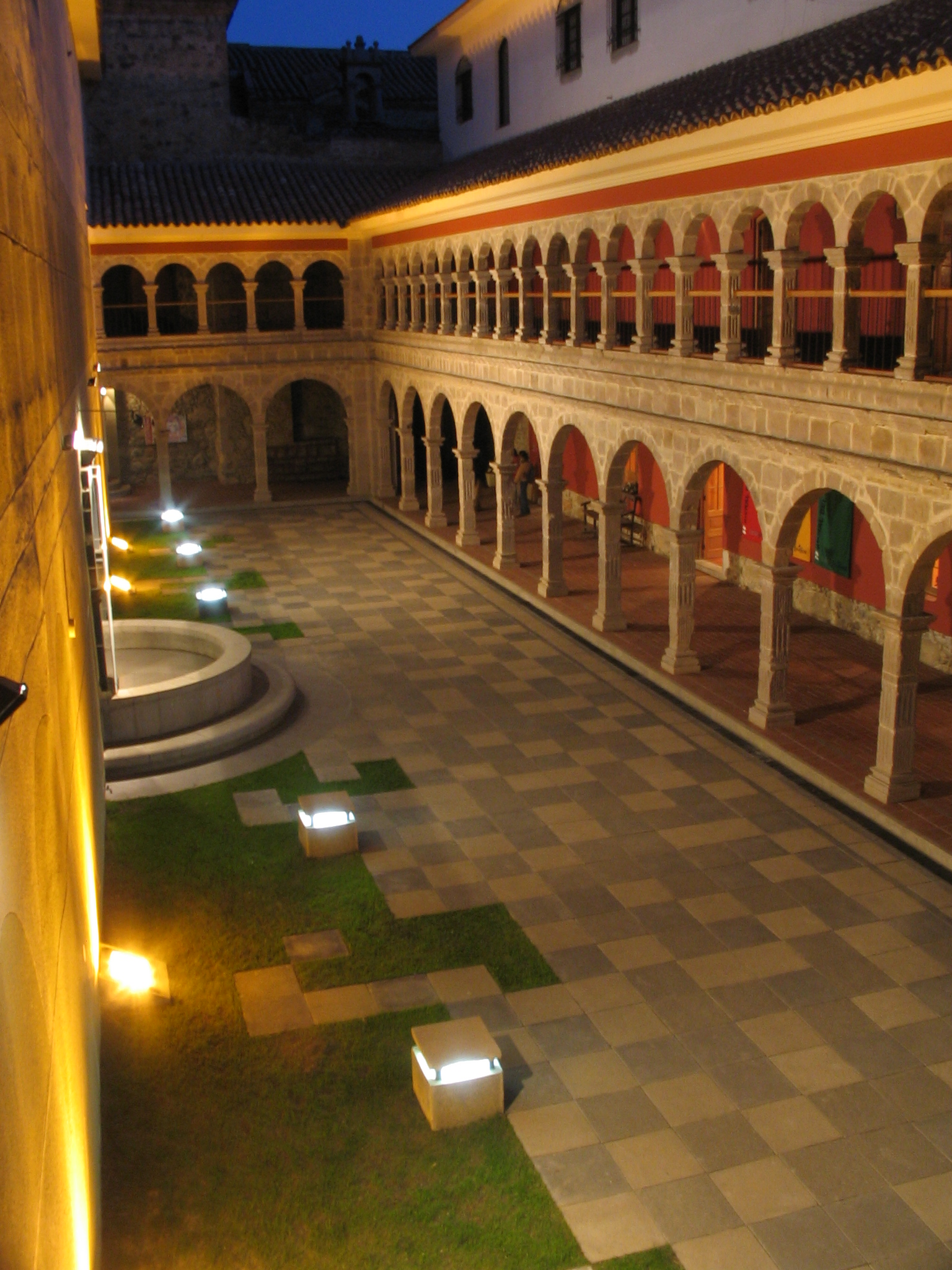
The cloister.

== See also ==
- Museo San Francisco Cultural Center
