= Museo San Francisco Cultural Center =

Cultural institution located in La Paz city, Bolivia

Coordinates: 16°29′46.413″S 68°8′12.67″W

Centro Cultural Museo San Francisco
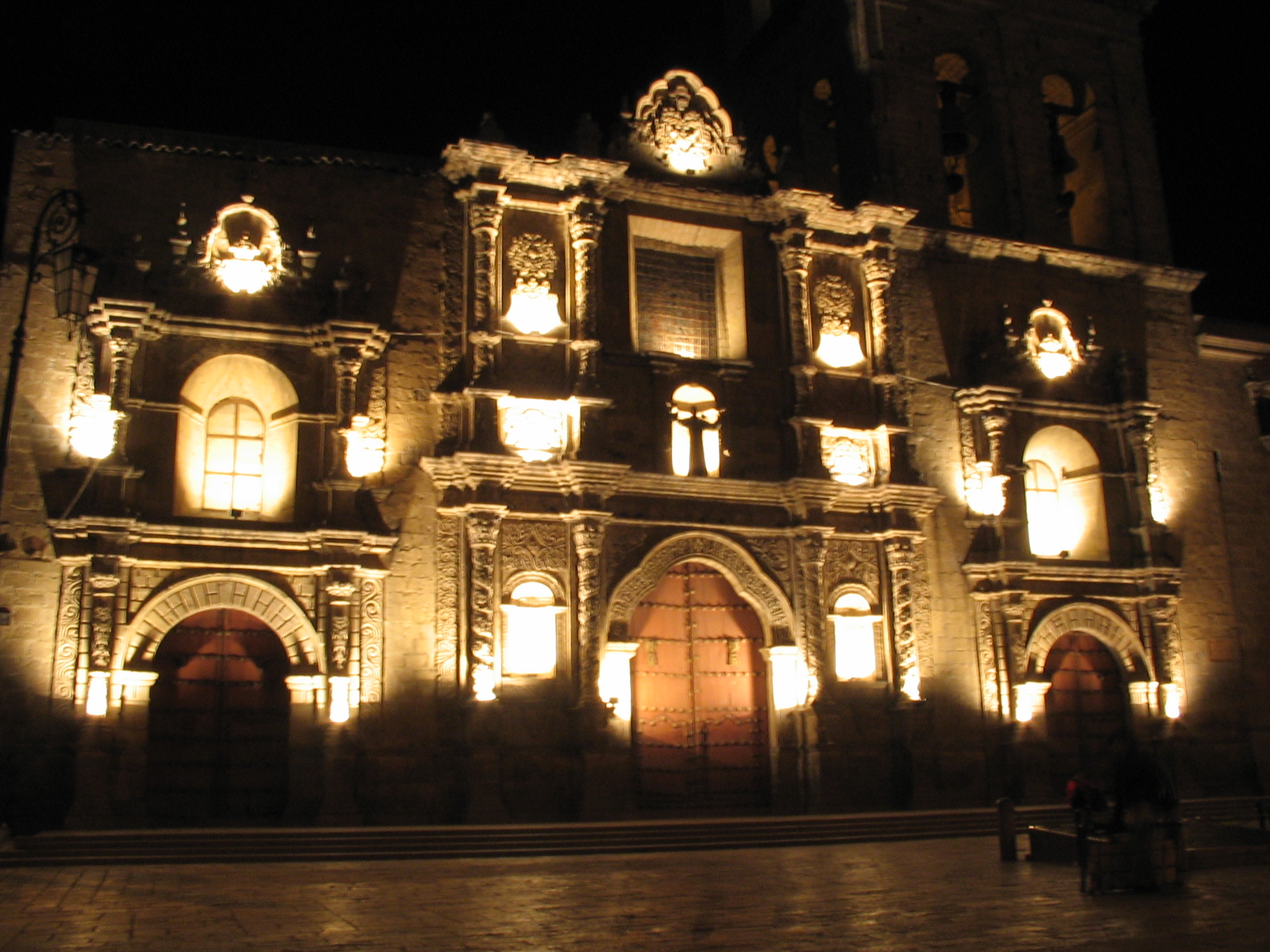
- Established: 1953
- Location: Plaza San Francisco Nº 501, La Paz, Bolivia
- Director: José Luis Ríos Cambeses
- Website: www.museosanfranciscobolivia.com/

The Museo San Francisco Cultural Center is a cultural institution located in La Paz city, Bolivia. It was established with the aim of preserving and conserving the arts and memories related to events and historic moments of the city of La Paz in Bolivia, because the history of the convent and the Basilica of San Francisco that houses the museum is closely related to the history of this city.

== History ==
The old Franciscan convent was founded one year after the founding of the city of La Paz in the year of 1549 by the friars Francisco Morales and Francisco de Alcocer in invocation to Nuestra Señora de Los Ángeles (Our Lady of the Angels).

Built between 1549 and 1581, the original construction suffered a crash between 1608 and 1612. the Franciscans initially built a temple of adobe and straw in 1548, to subsequently build the complex that currently makes up the Museum. The building at the banks of the Choqueyapu river gave rise to the so-called Barrio de los Indios (Indian district) which was divided by the river of the main town square and the area occupied by the settlers.

The construction of the current Basilica of San Francisco was performed between 1743 and 1744, ending completely in 1753 with the closure and the transept dome roofing.

Between 1965 and 2005, were different restauracioines to the building, enabling part of the convent as a museum, some authors back the opening of the Museum until October 1948.

Since the 1970s, the convent was abandoned due to lack of maintenance and the progressive deterioration which made it uninhabitable. In 1988 is stepped in the front of the Basilica, carved in stone in the 18th century and also different works to the interior of the temple were.

In 1987 was obtained financing for the elaboration of a project the recovery the architectural complex, through the creation of a private restoration Center and the Museum of sacred art which did not materialized. Finally, in 1992, at the initiative of the Franciscan order began again the restoration work of the convent of San Francisco with the idea of turning it into a cultural center and museum. due to that the building then had already been declared as national monument, the authorization of the Deputy Minister of Culture of Bolivia was required to carry out the project.

Works were developed by phases between 1993 and June 2005, managing to recover among others spaces of the convent and the ancient cloister at two levels, such as current Museum's exhibit halls, also enabled the main cloister, on ground floor and the choir of the basilica, among other architectural environments.

== Collections ==
The main arts are religious paintings from indigenous people, refined examples of the so-called baroque mestizo style:

- CORONACIÓN DE ESPINAS (paint, 17th century): Jesus sitting with bare torso carrying a crown of thorns, while he receives a cane as scepter. The man crowning Jesus is a Spanish soldier, because in the past the indigenous identified him as Jesus.
- LA CRUCIFIXION (paint, 17th century): Painted by natives. In the picture Jesus is crucified by four nails, also included faces of people who were possibly the ones that retouched the paint.
- MILAGRO DE LAS MANZANAS (paint, 18th century): St. Francis watches a child who was revived by his intercession, coming out of a coffer and holding an apple. Through the door, a landscape with Flemish influence. Noteworthy are the use of intense color and the detailed ornamentation.
- VIRGEN DE POMATA (paint, 17th century): Virgin Mary and Child Jesus wear plumed crowns, evoking pre-Hispanic Andean royalty. The Virgin is surrounded by wreaths of flowers and holds a rosary in her hand.
- MURALS: A hall and the wine cellar were decorated with murals, painted in the 17th and 18th centuries. The ornamental drawings of trees, flowers, leaves and birds, as well as flower vases and parrots were painted directly on the stucco, mixing natural pigments with egg and glue as binding agents. The adobe wall was covered with a mixture of lime and sand on top of which a fine layer of plaster was applied.

== See also ==
Basilica of San Francisco
