= Pietro Ayres =

Italian painter (1794–1878)

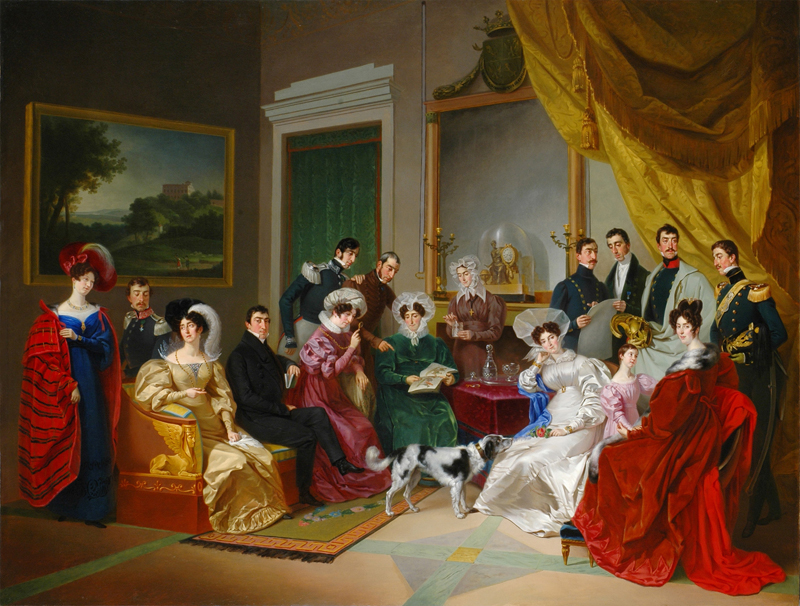
The La Marmora Family, 1828

Pietro Ayres (November 9, 1794 – June 11, 1878) was an Italian painter, mostly of portraits in Piedmont.

As a young man, he left in 1812 to fight for the Napoleonic armies in their disastrous entry into Russia. Upon the restoration of the House of Savoy, he exiled himself to Rome for 14 years. He then briefly traveled to Savigliano, and then to Turin. In 1830, he painted the portrait of Count Galeani Napione, which gained him an appointment as a court portraitist. He painted various members of the royal family, as well as portraits of Marchese Filippo Asinari, Giuseppe Barbaroux, Filippo Morozzo, Count Bogino, Marchese d'Ormea. He also painted a Hagar in Desert and altarpieces for churches in Turin, Savigliano, Racconigi, and Alessandria. He also painted the ceiling and medallions and curtain of the Teatro Sociale. He also created an album of the costumes and arms of the Royal army of Charles Albert, titled Armeria antica e Moderna di S. M Carlo Alberto. He died in Turin.
