= Plaza de San Francisco de Asís =

Public square in Havana, Cuba

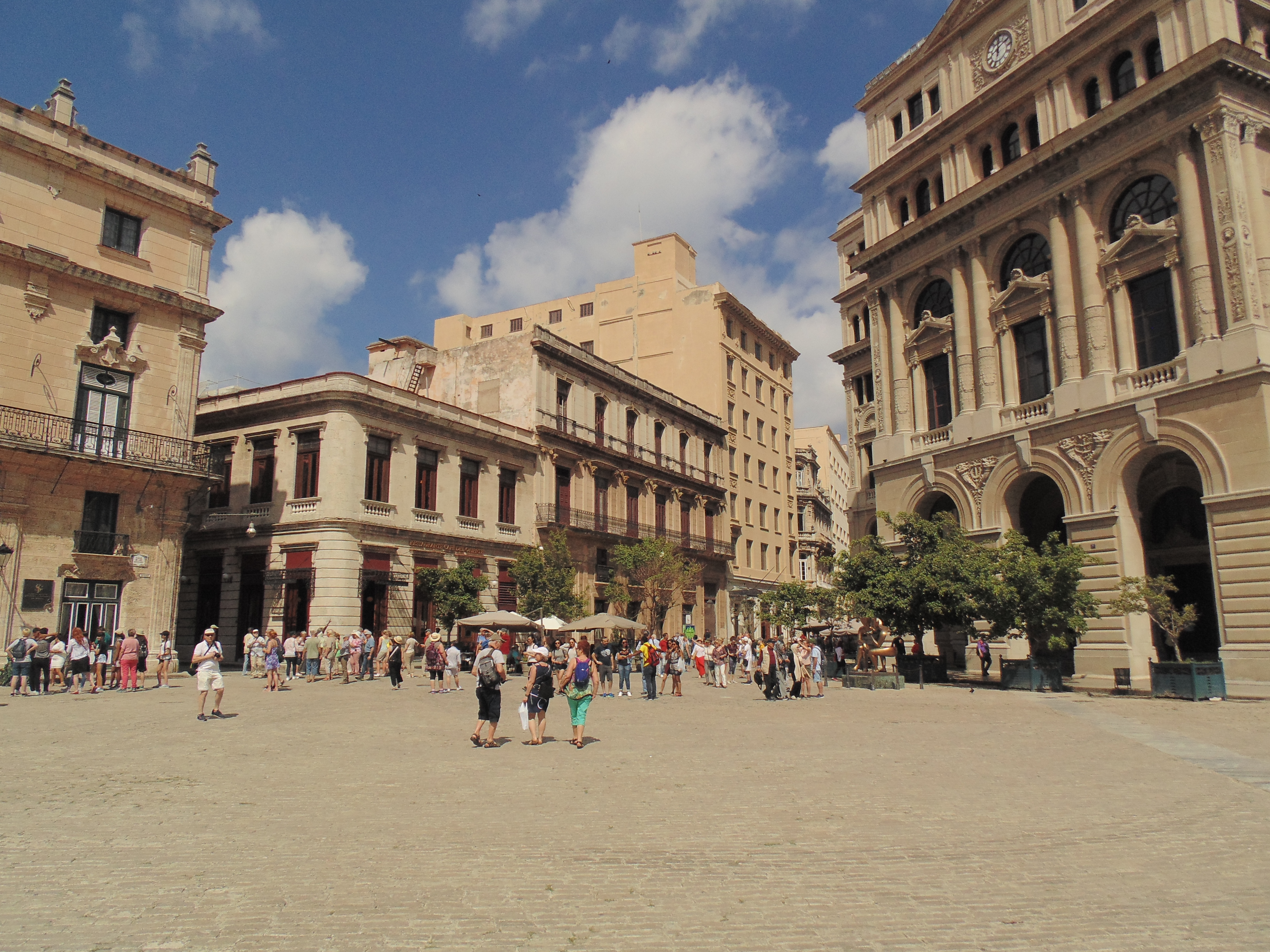
The north side of the Plaza de San Francisco de Asís. The Lonja del Comercio is the rightmost building.

Plaza de San Francisco de Asís (Saint Francis of Assisi Square) is a public square in the district of Old Havana, Havana, Cuba.

== History ==
Founded on 2 June 1628, this plaza is one of the oldest squares in Havana. It is named after the nearby Convento de San Francisco de Asís, a Franciscan convent built between 1575 and 1591. A market was historically held in this square, which was eventually moved to the Plaza Vieja as the monks from the church complained of the noise.

The Lonja del Comercio building on the north side of the square opened in 1909. The iconic Fuente de los Leones, built by Italian sculptor Giuseppe Gaggini, was installed in 1836.

In 1761, José Martín Félix de Arrate, Mayor of Havana, considered the Plaza to be the best place in the city. Both the city hall (casas capitulares), police house, jailhouse and customs office faced the Plaza at the time.

== Present Day ==
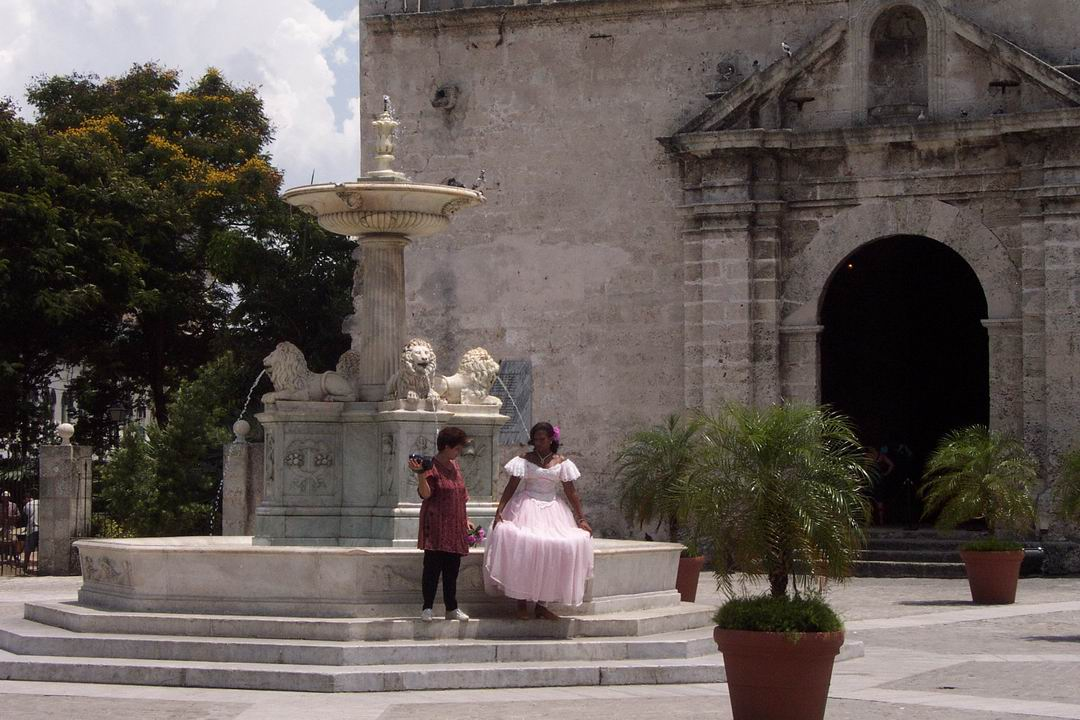
Fuente de los Leones, photo of 2003

Plaza de San Francisco de Asís and adjacent buildings such as the Lonja del Comercio underwent a restoration in the 1990s. In current times, it is a tourism hub with numerous restaurants. It is in close proximity to the Sierra Maestra cruise ship terminal.
