= Art Museum of Antonio Paredes Candia =

Coordinates: 16.5197°S 68.1514°W

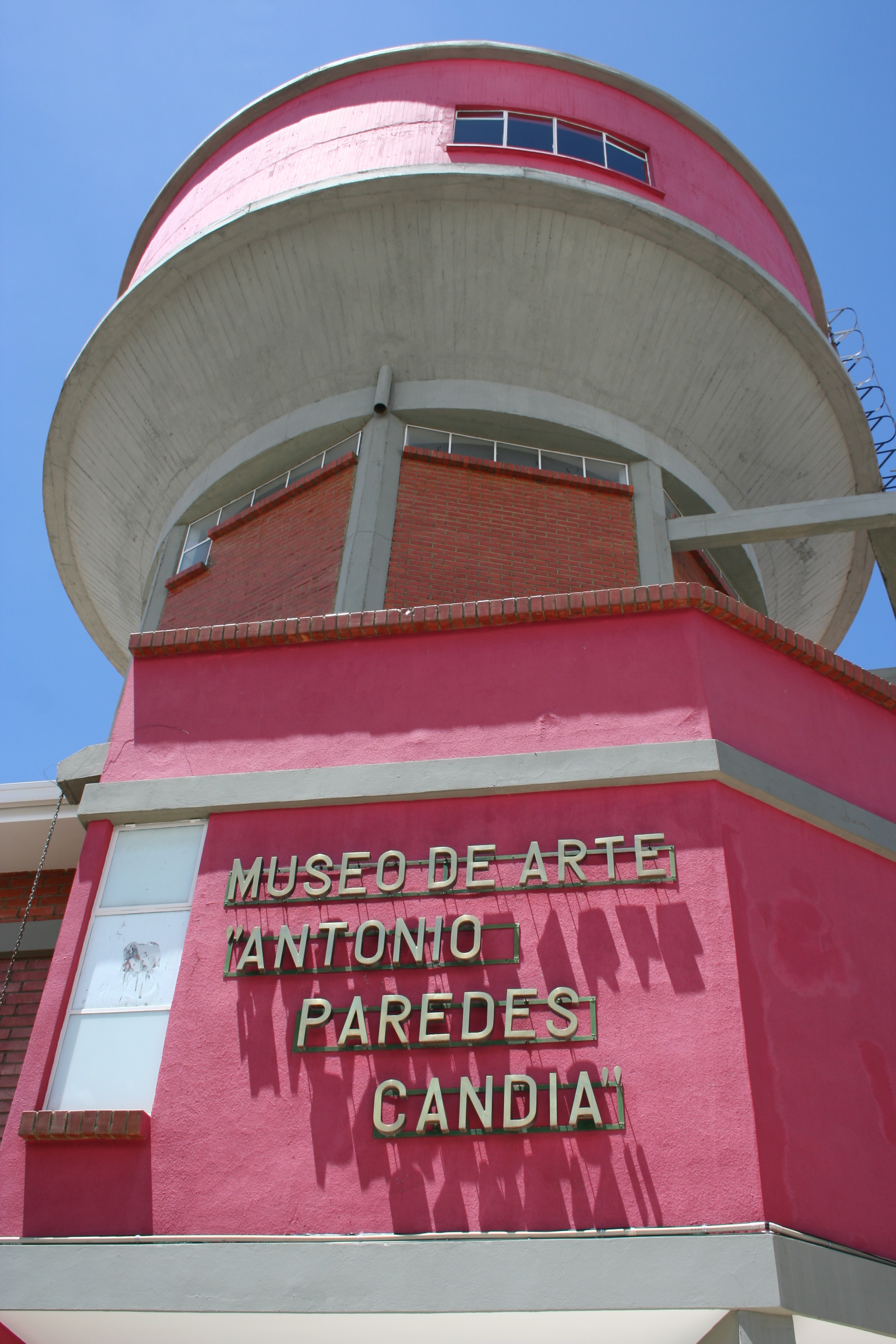
Façade of the museum

The Art Museum of Antonio Paredes Candia (Museo de Arte Antonio Paredes Candia) is a museum in El Alto, Bolivia. It holds more than 500 works of art, and 11000 books.

== See also ==
- List of museums in Bolivia
