= Bolivian Red Cross =

Bolivian humanitarian organization

- Cruz Roja Boliviana
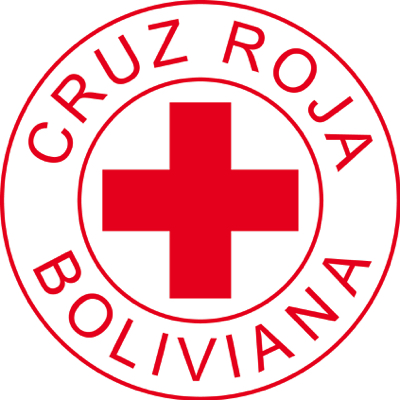
- Formation: 15 May 1917; 108 years ago
- Founder: Juan Manuel Balcázar
- Purpose: Humanitarian aid
- Headquarters: La Paz, Bolivia
- Region served: Bolivia
- Parent organization: International Federation of Red Cross and Red Crescent Societies
- Website: cruzrojaboliviana.org.bo

The Bolivian Red Cross (Spanish: Cruz Roja Boliviana; CRB) is the national Red Cross society for Bolivia. It is the designated affiliate of the International Federation of Red Cross and Red Crescent Societies and the International Red Cross and Red Crescent Movement. It was founded in La Paz by Juan Manuel Balcázar on 15 May 1917.

== Background ==
The Ambulances of the Army (Spanish: Ambulancias del Ejército) were established as a result of the War of the Pacific (1879–1884), when a call was put forth for midwives to organize supplies and help attend the wounded of the war. On 20 January 1879, nine nuns from the Sisters of Charity of Saint Anne in Italy arrived in Tacna. Among the first volunteers were Ignacia Zeballos Taborga.

Tomás Frías, the minister plenipotentiary to Spain, initiated the organization of the Red Cross of Bolivia on 16 October 1879, and agreed to have it adhere to the Geneva Convention of 1864. Zenón Dalence was placed in charge of the service and drafted regulations for the establishment of field hospitals. Dalence commissioned Vicenta Paredes Mier as inspector of the field kitchen and named Rosaura Rodríguez as official cook. Andrea Bilbao was the first nurse to wear the emblem of the Red Cross into battle, but Zeballos, who has been named "the mother of soldiers", was the initiator of red cross nursing.

== Foundation ==
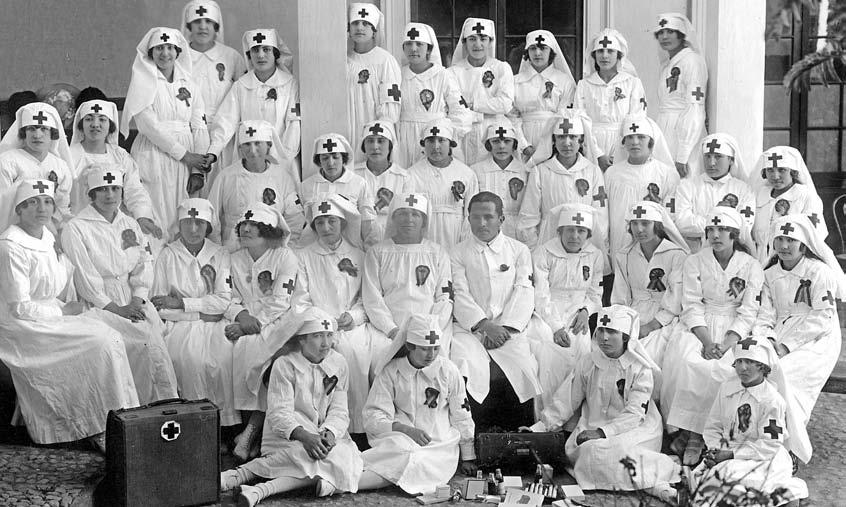
Balcázar with nurses of the Red Cross

The Bolivian Red Cross was officially established on 15 May 1917 by a group of teachers from the Lyceum Venezuela in La Paz under the leadership of Juan Manuel Balcázar. It was formed as a volunteer organization to collaborate with the Bolivian Army and Public Health Service.

Balcázar drew up the by-laws of the organization. Its statutes reflect a will to provide voluntary health services, public charity, and collaborate with military health. They were approved by the government on 30 October 1918. Balcázar directed the Bolivian Red Cross for a short time. During time period, the Red Cross Nurses School was founded, whose operation was approved by the government on 21 February. 1918. The title of Lady of the Red Cross was also created. One of the first students of the first aid courses was María Josefa Saavedra, who attended them at Balcázar's request.

The organization was recognized by the International Committee of the Red Cross on 10 January 1923. It was admitted as the fiftieth national society of the International Federation of Red Cross and Red Crescent Societies on 22 January 1923. In 1963 the Bolivian Red Cross received the highest national distinction when it was awarded the Order of the Condor of the Andes by the government.
