= National Museum of Archaeology, Bolivia =

Archaeological museum in Bolivia

National Museum of Archaeology (Bolivia)
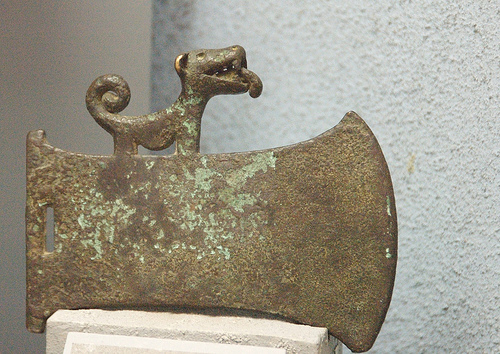
- Exhibit of an axe head with animal decoration in Bolivia's National Museum of Archaeology

- Location of National Museum of Archaeology (Bolivia) in La Paz
- Established: Original in 1864, in new form in January 1960
- Location: La Paz Bolivia
- Coordinates: 16.50°S 68.15°W
- Type: Archaeological and Anthropological
- Director: Max Portugal Ortiz Secretaria General.
- Curator: Julio Cesar Velasquez Alquizaleth.
- Website: www.bolivian.com/arqueologia/mna.html

The National Museum of Archaeology of Bolivia (Spanish: Museo Nacional de Arqueología de Bolivia) is the national archaeology museum of Bolivia. It is located in the capital of La Paz, two blocks east of the Prado. Operated by the National Institute of Archaeology, a specialized agency of the Deputy Minister of Culture, it is said to be the most prominent museum in Bolivia. The museum represents the cultural antecedents of the Bolivian people from the pre-Columbian era. There are displays of carved sculptures, as well as ceramic and painted objects in stone and metals.

== History ==
Archbishop José Manuel Indaburo, considered to be the father figure of archaeology in Bolivia, was instrumental in establishing the museum with collections of archaeological, ethnographic and natural science antiquaries. In June 1846, in the presence of General José Ballivián, a small collection was started in a room in the Municipal Theatre. The theatre was located on Calle Genaro Sanjinés in La Paz and named the "Public Museum"; Dr. Manuel Cordova was its first director.

In 1919, the multidisciplinary "National Museum" was opened at the Tiwanaku Palace on a lease basis. By an executive order of 22 May 1922, President Bautista Saavedra authorized purchasing the building to house the museum. It continued as a multidisciplinary museum until early 1959. Dr. Carlos Ponce Sanginés who held the post of Director of the Center for Archaeological Research in Tiwanaku, campaigned and got it reopened on January 31, 1960 as the National Museum of Archaeology.

== Collections ==
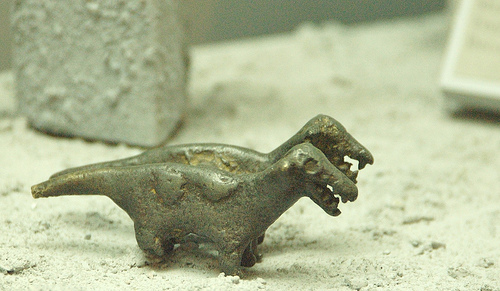
Exhibit of Pre-Columbian beasts made of gold in Bolivia's National Museum of Archaeology.

The national museum is part of the National Institute of Archaeology under the administrative jurisdiction of the Deputy Minister of Culture. It has more than 50,000 archaeological items which were found through research and excavation work. It represents the cultures of the eastern plains and of the western mountainous region. The cultural development of the Bolivian people, as it evolved over the past several centuries, is represented.

The exhibits on display in the permanent exhibition consist of valuable artifacts of Tiwanaku, Chiripa, Mollo, Inca and eastern Bolivian cultures. It also houses the collections of Bishop Indaburu and Colonel Diez de Medina, in addition to items from recent archaeological excavations. The exhibits reflect the heritage that evolved over several centuries. These include sculpture, paintings, music and dancing, representing a fusion of Indian and European cultures.

A high relief carving on display is made of black stone and has a geometric design. It belongs to the Chinpa culture (about 1500 BC), and was taken from the Traco Peninsula in Los Andes Province. Bronze Inca figures, mummies and a monolith, which belonged to the Tiwanaku and Inca cultures, are also on display. Tiwanaku (which is predated to the Inca period) is the Pre-Columbian archaeological site in western Bolivia, which is traced to early 1500 BC. Other exhibits include Pre-Columbian period animals.

== See also ==
- List of museums in Bolivia
