= Plaza San Francisco =

Plaza in La Paz, Bolivia

Coordinates: 16.4959°S 68.1371°W

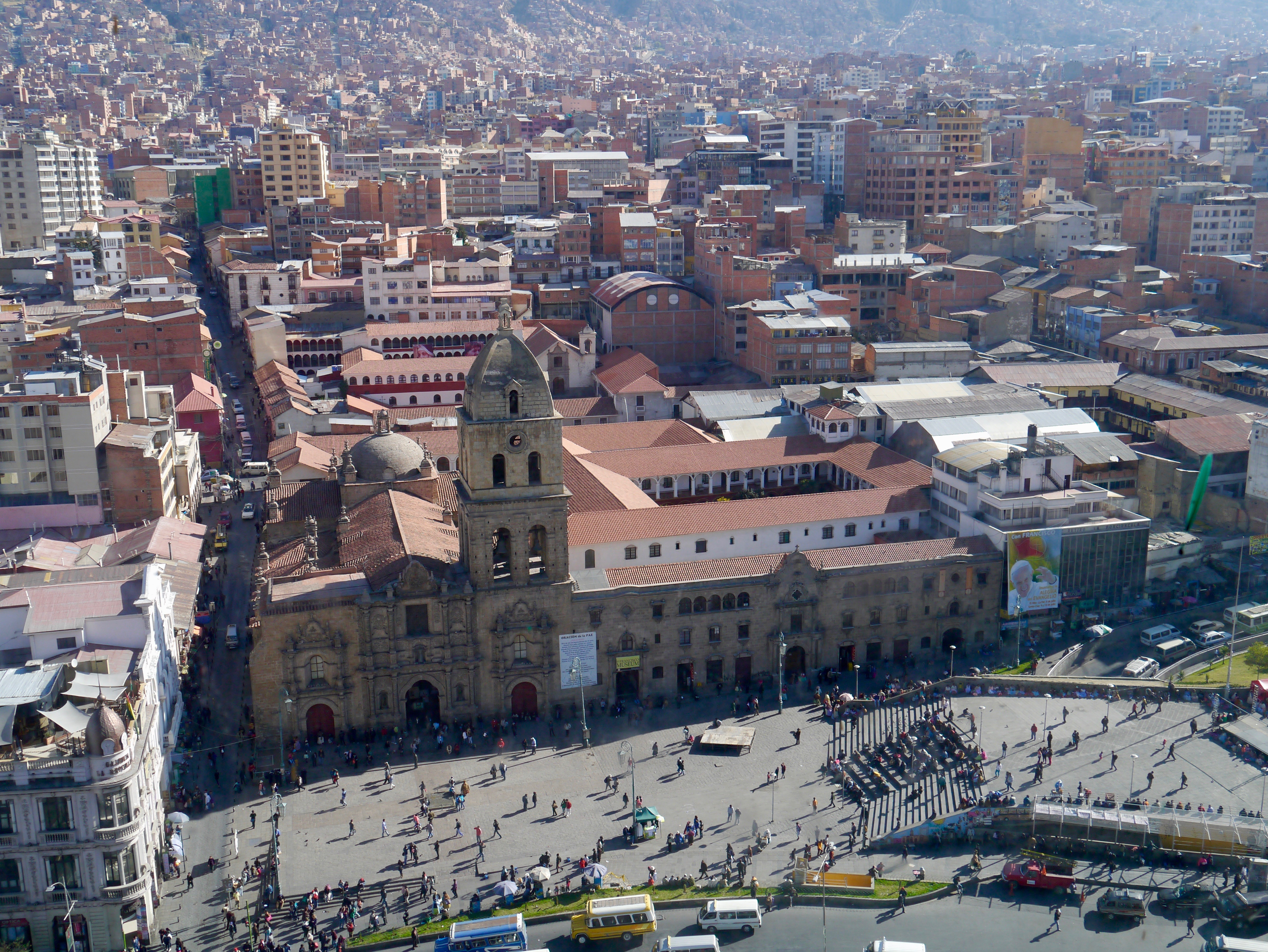
View of the Plaza San Francisco and the San Francisco Cathedral set within central La Paz, Bolivia.

Plaza San Francisco is a major urban plaza in the city of La Paz, Bolivia, and a frequent location for political gatherings and protests. It is located in front of the Basilica of San Francisco (from which it takes its name) as well as the Lanza Market and the headquarters of the La Paz Factory Worker's Departmental Union Federation. The plaza was enlarged to 6,163 square meters in 2011. It was designated the city's Plaza Mayor, although this title had been used in the past for the Plaza Murillo. Together with the 1,140-square-meter Plaza Fabril constructed at the same time in front of the Factory Worker's Federation, it constitutes the largest open public space in urban La Paz.

It is located in the old town, and bordered on the north by Perez Velasco street, which is a short segment of La Paz's main artery. Perez Velasco roughly follows the route of the now-culverted Choqueyapu River.

== History ==
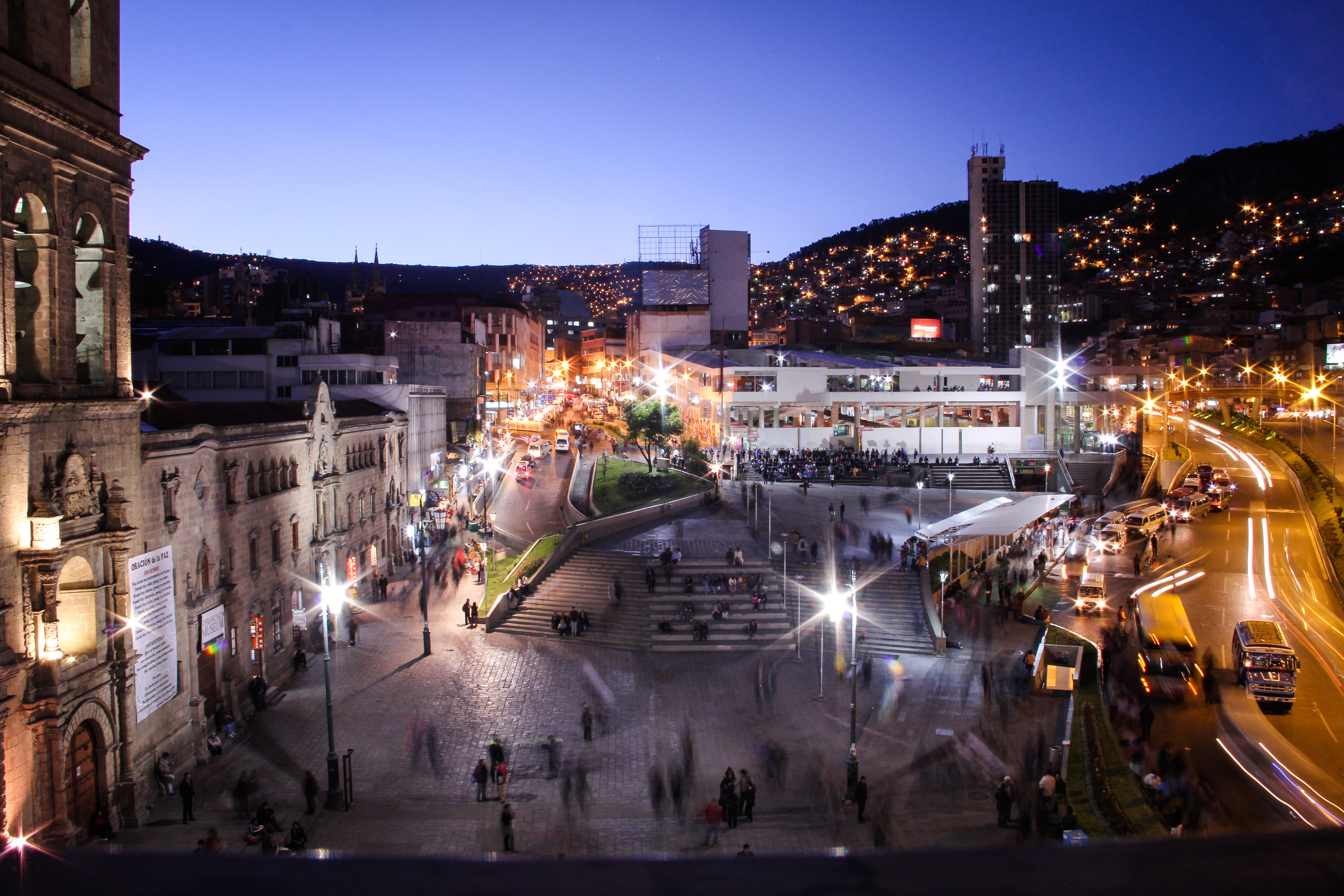
Plaza San Francisco in La Paz, Bolivia, in evening.

The plaza has long been a politically important space. It was a strategic location during the three-day April insurrection that won the 1952 Revolution. Following the dictatorship years of 1971–82, elected president Hernán Siles Suazo came to the Plaza first upon returning from exile. In the 2003 Gas War, the plaza was the central gathering place for crowds opposing the privatization of Bolivia's gas resources and demanding the resignation of President Gonzalo Sánchez de Lozada.
