= Joint Agricultural Weather Facility =

The Joint Agricultural Weather Facility (JAWF), created in 1978, is a cooperative effort between USDA's World Agricultural Outlook Board and the National Oceanic and Atmospheric Administration of the U.S. Department of Commerce to collect, on an ongoing basis, global weather data and agricultural information to determine the impact of weather conditions on crop and livestock production. JAWF reports are followed closely not only by producers but also by commodity traders.
