= World Agricultural Supply and Demand Estimates =

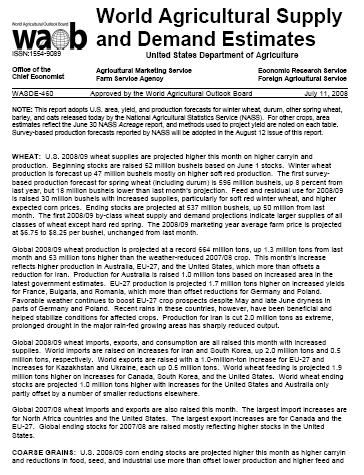
- Discipline: Agriculture
- Language: English
- Edited by: World Agricultural Outlook Board

Publication details
- History: 1973–present
- Publisher: United States Department of Agriculture (United States)
- Frequency: Monthly
- License: Public domain

Standard abbreviations
- ISO 4: World Agric. Supply Demand Estim.

Indexing
- ISSN: 1554-9089

Links
- Journal homepage; Latest version (PDF); Latest version (Text file); Online access

The World Agricultural Supply and Demand Estimates (WASDE) is a monthly report published by the United States Department of Agriculture (USDA) providing a comprehensive forecast of supply and demand for major crops (global and United States) and livestock (U.S. only). The report provides an analysis of the fundamental conditions of the agricultural international markets for the use of farmers, governments, and other market participants.

The WASDE report is compiled using information from several statistical reports produced by the USDA and other government agencies. It is widely considered the benchmark to which all other private and public agricultural forecasts are compared.

The recent releases of the WASDE report provide forecasts covering:

- Crops (U.S. and global), including wheat, rice, corn, sorghum, barley, oats, soybeans, cotton, and sugar.
- Livestock (U.S. only), including meat animals, poultry, and dairy.

The WASDE report is generally released between the 8th and 12th of each month at 12:00 noon Eastern Time. It is available in electronic form (as a PDF or text file) and can be downloaded from the USDA website from the time of release. Subscription to the report can be made through the Albert R. Mann Library for delivery by e-mail shortly after release on the Internet. As a work of the United States government, the WASDE reports are released into the public domain in accordance with U.S. copyright law, 17 U.S.C. § 105.

== History ==
Predecessor publications date back to the 19th century. In 1893, the USDA Division of Statistics published Production and distribution of the principal agricultural products of the world, a miscellaneous report representing several months of work in compiling the first overview of the production of major crops around the world. Subsequent such reports appeared irregularly, and evolved by the 1960s into commodity-oriented circulars published at regular intervals by USDA agencies.

The first direct predecessor of the WASDE report was released on September 17, 1973, as the Agricultural Supply and Demand Estimates. It was initially focused on supply, demand, and trade in the United States. On October 14, 1980, the report was released for the first time as the World Agricultural Supply and Demand Estimates, and it was the first report to provide categorized estimates for the world, the US, total foreign, major importers, and major exporters. Estimates for individual countries were first included in the report released on January 11, 1985.

== See also ==
- United States Department of Agriculture
- Agriculture in the United States
