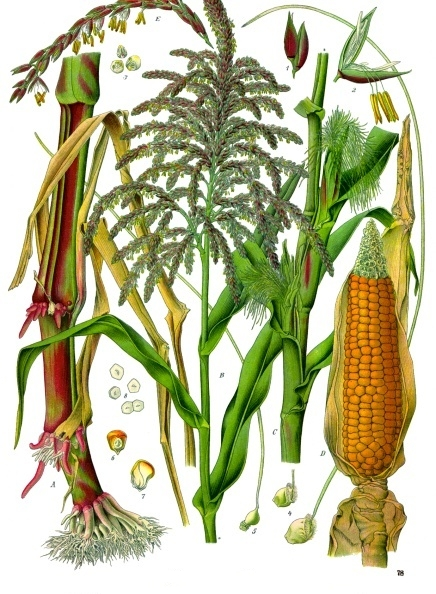
- Includes male and female flowers

Conservation status
- Least Concern (IUCN 3.1)

Scientific classification
- Kingdom: Plantae
- Clade: Tracheophytes
- Clade: Angiosperms
- Clade: Monocots
- Clade: Commelinids
- Order: Poales
- Family: Poaceae
- Subfamily: Panicoideae
- Genus: Zea
- Species: Z. mays

Binomial name
- Zea mays L.

= Maize =

Species of grass cultivated as a food crop

Maize (US: /ˈmeɪz/; Zea mays), also known as corn, is a tall stout grass that produces cereal grain. The leafy stalk of the plant gives rise to male inflorescences or tassels which produce pollen, and female inflorescences called ears. The ears yield grain, known as kernels or seeds. In modern commercial varieties, these are usually yellow or white; other varieties can be of many colors. Maize was domesticated by indigenous peoples in southern Mexico about 9,000 years ago from wild teosinte. Native Americans planted it alongside beans and squashes in the Three Sisters polyculture.

Maize relies on humans for its propagation. Since the Columbian exchange, it has become a staple food in many parts of the world, with the total production of maize surpassing that of wheat and rice. Much maize is used for animal feed, whether as grain (fodder) or as the whole plant, which can either be baled as forage or made into the more palatable silage. Sugar-rich varieties called sweet corn are grown for human consumption, while field corn varieties are used for animal feed, for uses such as cornmeal or masa, corn starch, corn syrup, pressing into corn oil, alcoholic beverages like bourbon whiskey, and as chemical feedstocks including ethanol and other biofuels.

Maize is cultivated throughout the world; a greater weight of maize is produced each year than any other grain. In 2020, world production was 1.1 billion tonnes. It is afflicted by many pests and diseases; two major insect pests, European corn borer and corn rootworms, have each caused annual losses of a billion dollars in the United States. Modern plant breeding has greatly increased output and qualities such as nutrition, drought tolerance, and tolerance of pests and diseases. Much maize is now genetically modified.

As a food, maize is used to make a wide variety of dishes including Mexican tortillas and tamales, Italian polenta, and American hominy grits. Maize protein is low in some essential amino acids, and the niacin it contains only becomes available if freed by alkali treatment. In pre-Columbian Mesoamerica, maize was deified as a maize god and depicted in sculptures.

== Description ==

Maize is a tall annual grass with a single stem, ranging in height from 1.2 to 4 m (4 to 13 ft). The long narrow leaves arise from the nodes or joints, alternately on opposite sides on the stalk. Maize is monoecious, with separate male and female flowers on the same plant. At the top of the stem is the tassel, an inflorescence of male flowers; their anthers release pollen, which is dispersed by wind. The female inflorescence, some way down the stem from the tassel, is first seen as a silk, a bundle of soft tubular hairs, one for the carpel in each female flower, which develops into a kernel (often called a seed. Botanically, as in all grasses, it is a fruit, fused with the seed coat to form a caryopsis) when it is pollinated. A whole female inflorescence develops into an ear or corncob, enveloped by multiple leafy layers or husks. The ear leaf is the leaf most closely associated with a particular developing ear. This leaf and those above it contribute over three quarters of the carbohydrate (starch) that fills the grain.

The grains are usually yellow or white in modern varieties; other varieties have orange, red, brown, blue, purple, or black grains. They are arranged in 8 to 32 rows around the cob; there can be up to 1200 grains on a large cob. Yellow maizes derive their color from carotenoids; red maizes are colored by anthocyanins and phlobaphenes; and orange and green varieties may contain combinations of these pigments.

Maize has short-day photoperiodism, meaning that it requires nights of a certain length to flower. Flowering further requires enough warm days above 10 °C (50 °F). The control of flowering is set genetically; the physiological mechanism involves the phytochrome system. Tropical cultivars can be problematic if grown in higher latitudes, as the longer days can make the plants grow tall instead of setting seed before winter comes. On the other hand, growing tall rapidly could be convenient for producing biofuel.

Immature maize shoots accumulate a powerful antibiotic substance, 2,4-dihydroxy-7-methoxy-1,4-benzoxazin-3-one (DIMBOA), which provides a measure of protection against a wide range of pests. Because of its shallow roots, maize is susceptible to droughts, intolerant of nutrient-deficient soils, and prone to being uprooted by severe winds.

The pollen is an allergen, but most of it falls within a few meters of the tassel and the risk is largely restricted to farm workers.

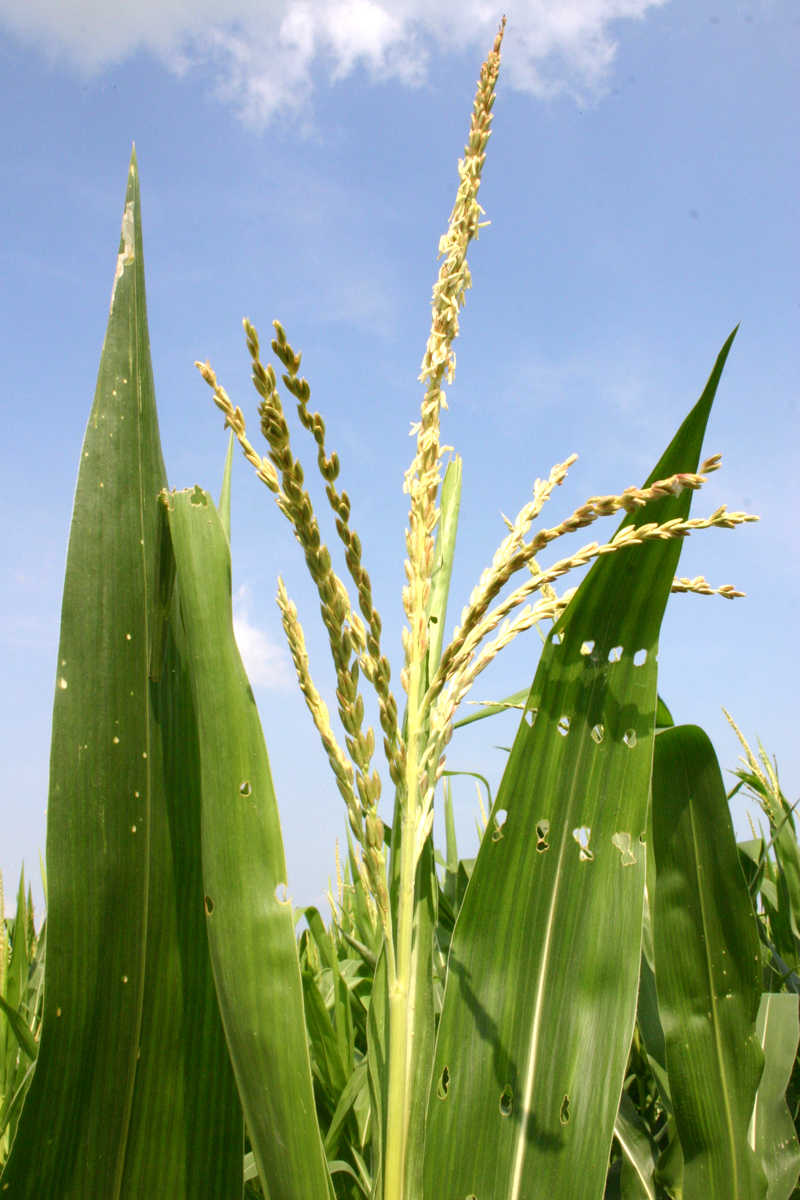
Many small male flowers make up the tassel.

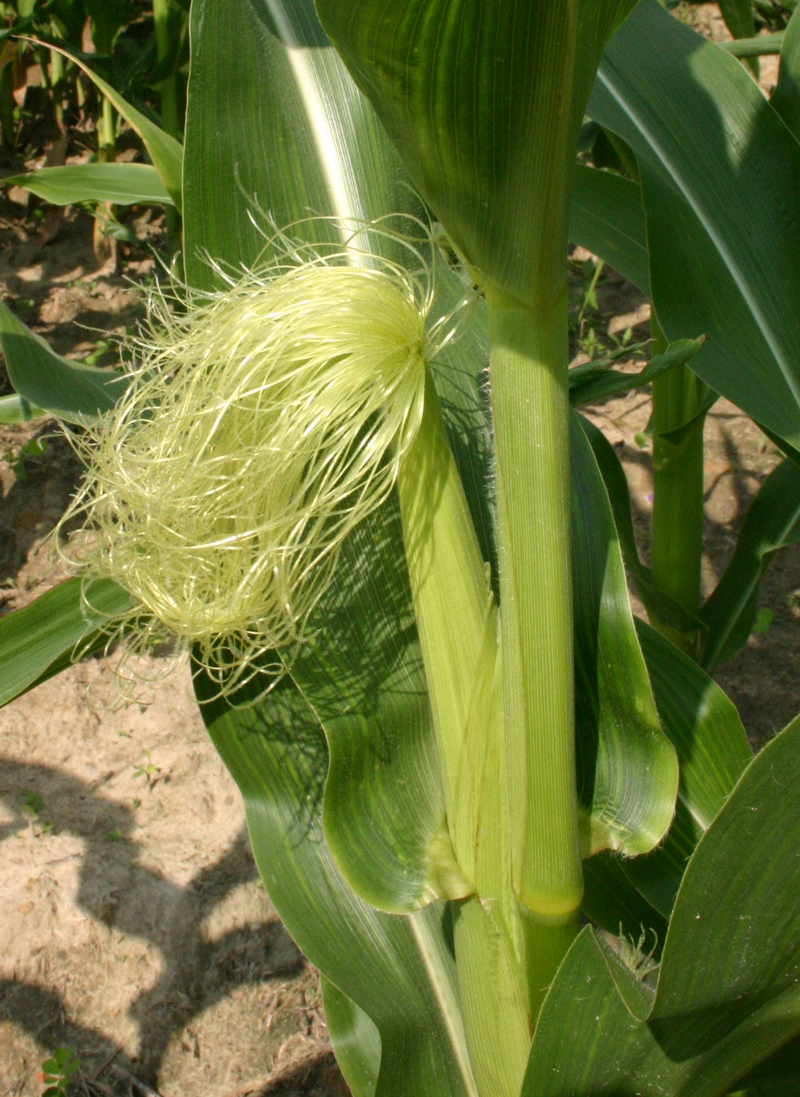
Female inflorescence, with young silk

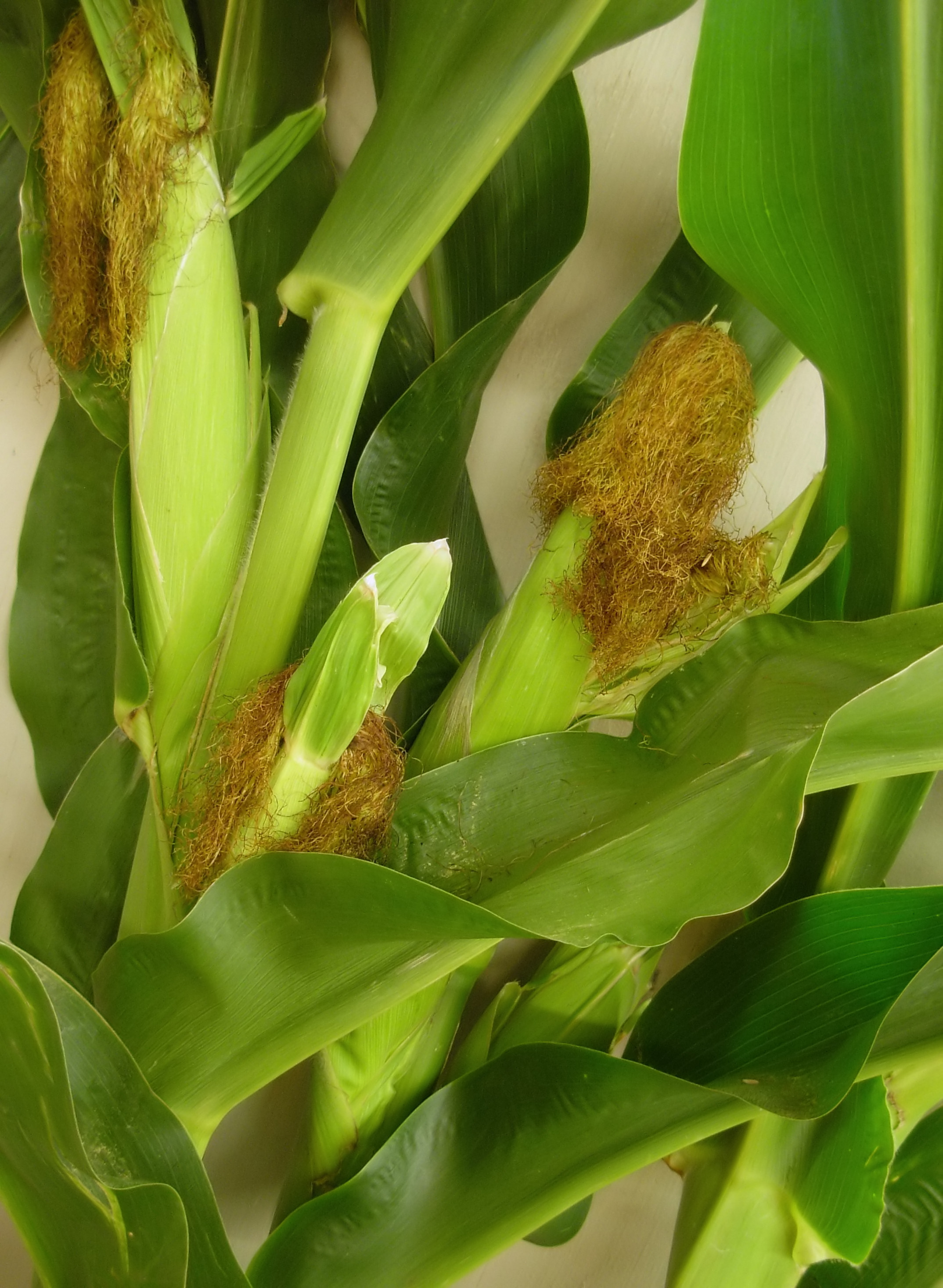
Stalks, ears and silk

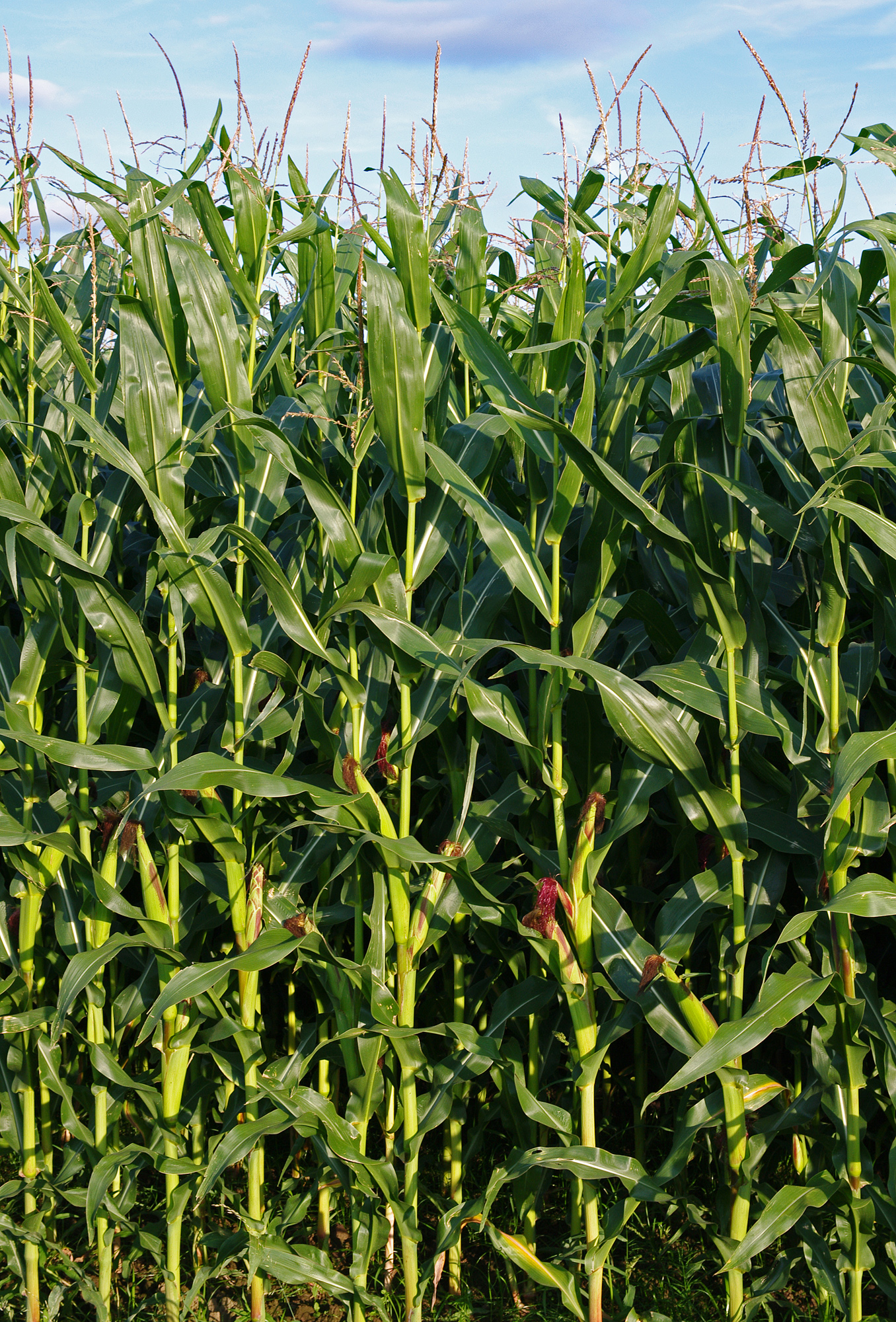
Full-grown maize plants

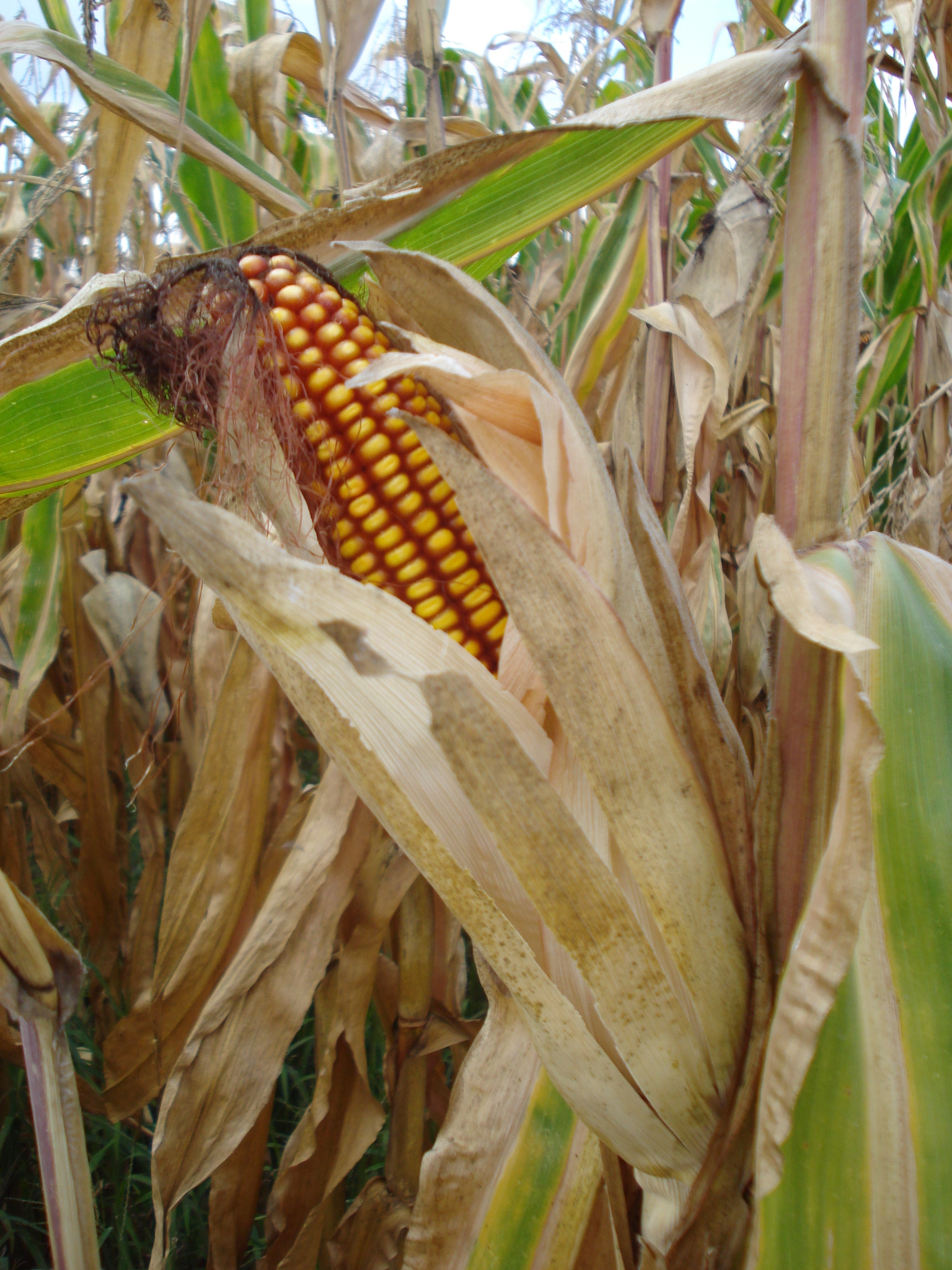
Mature maize ear on a stalk
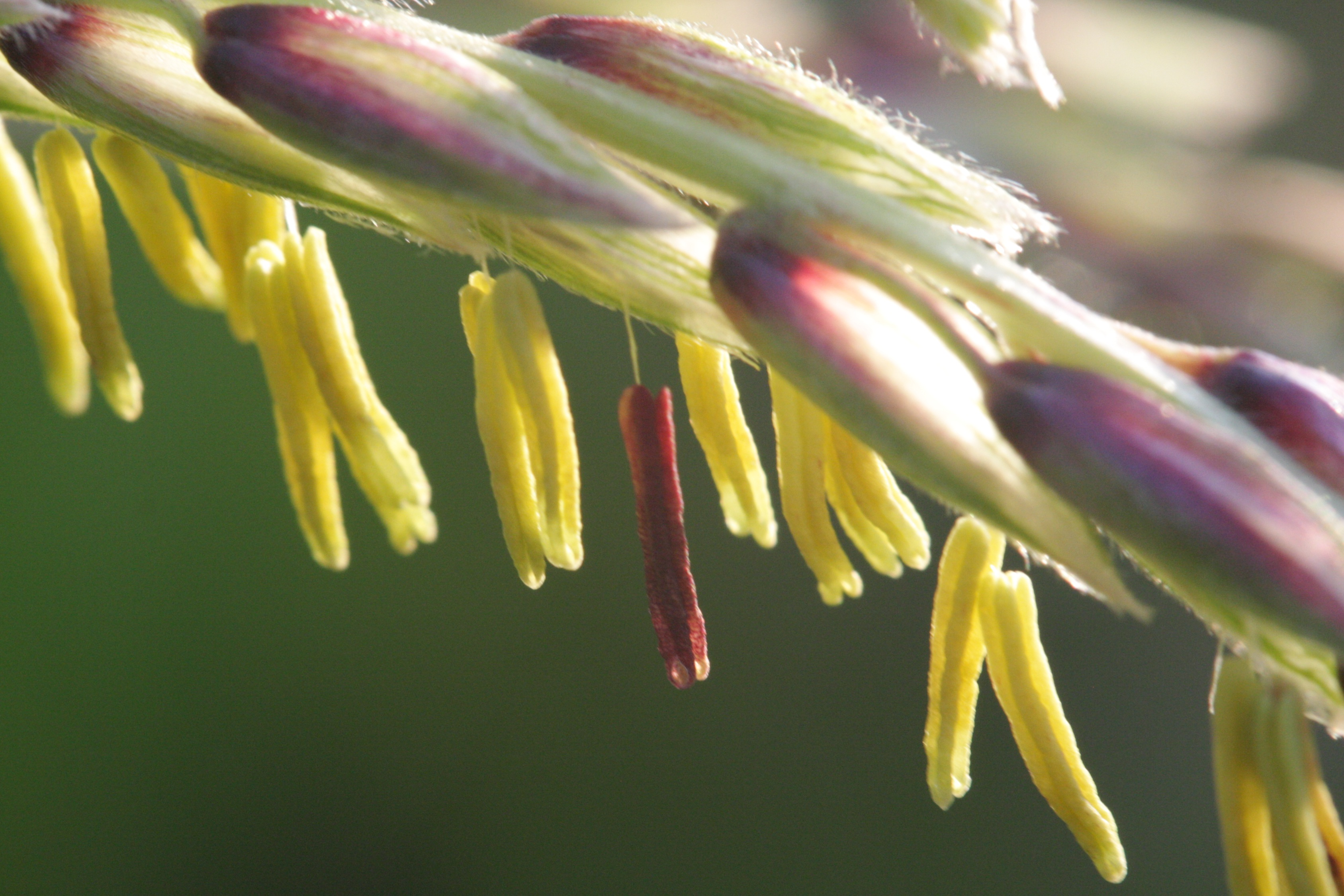
Male flowers

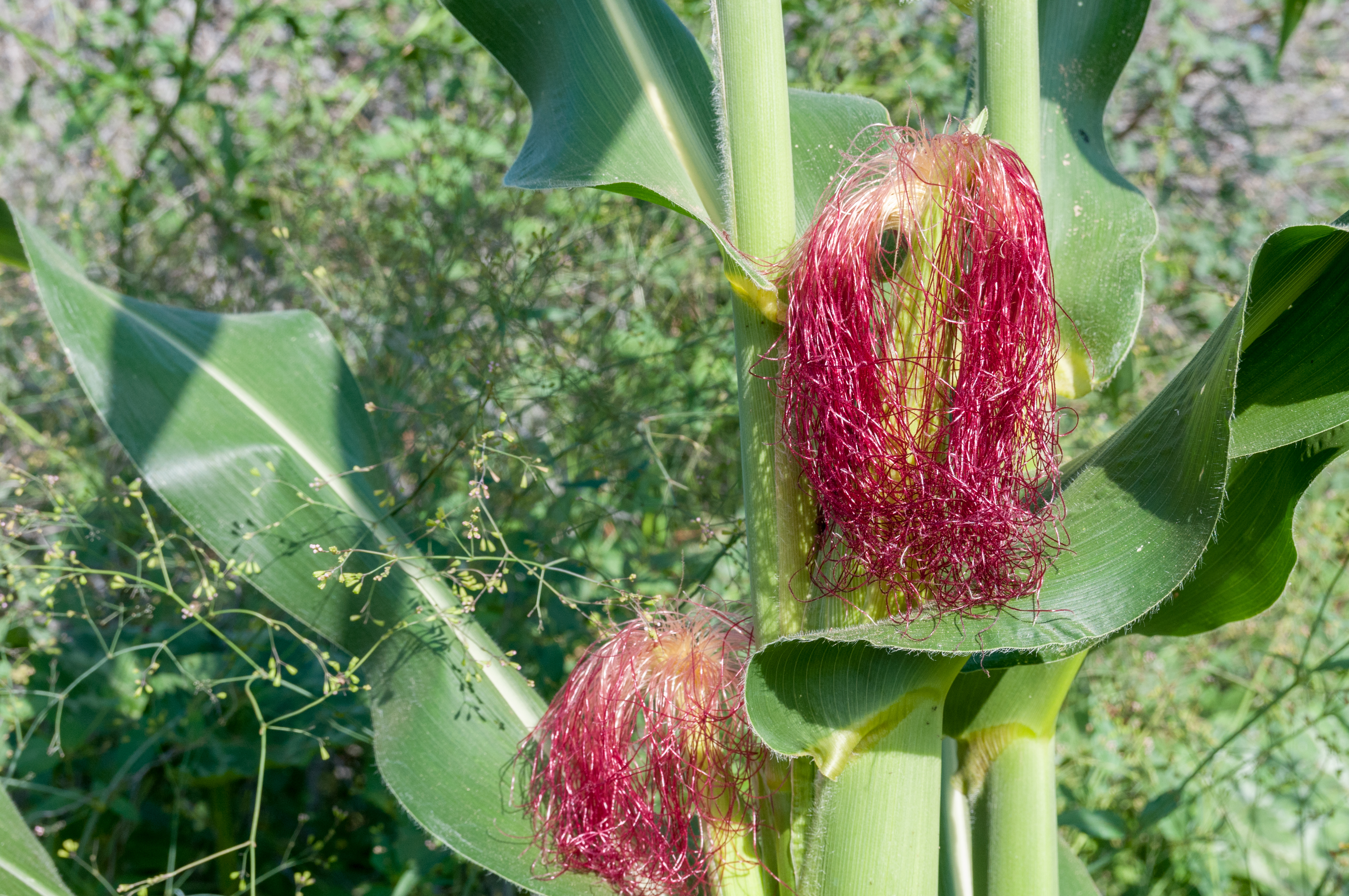
Mature silk

== Genetics ==
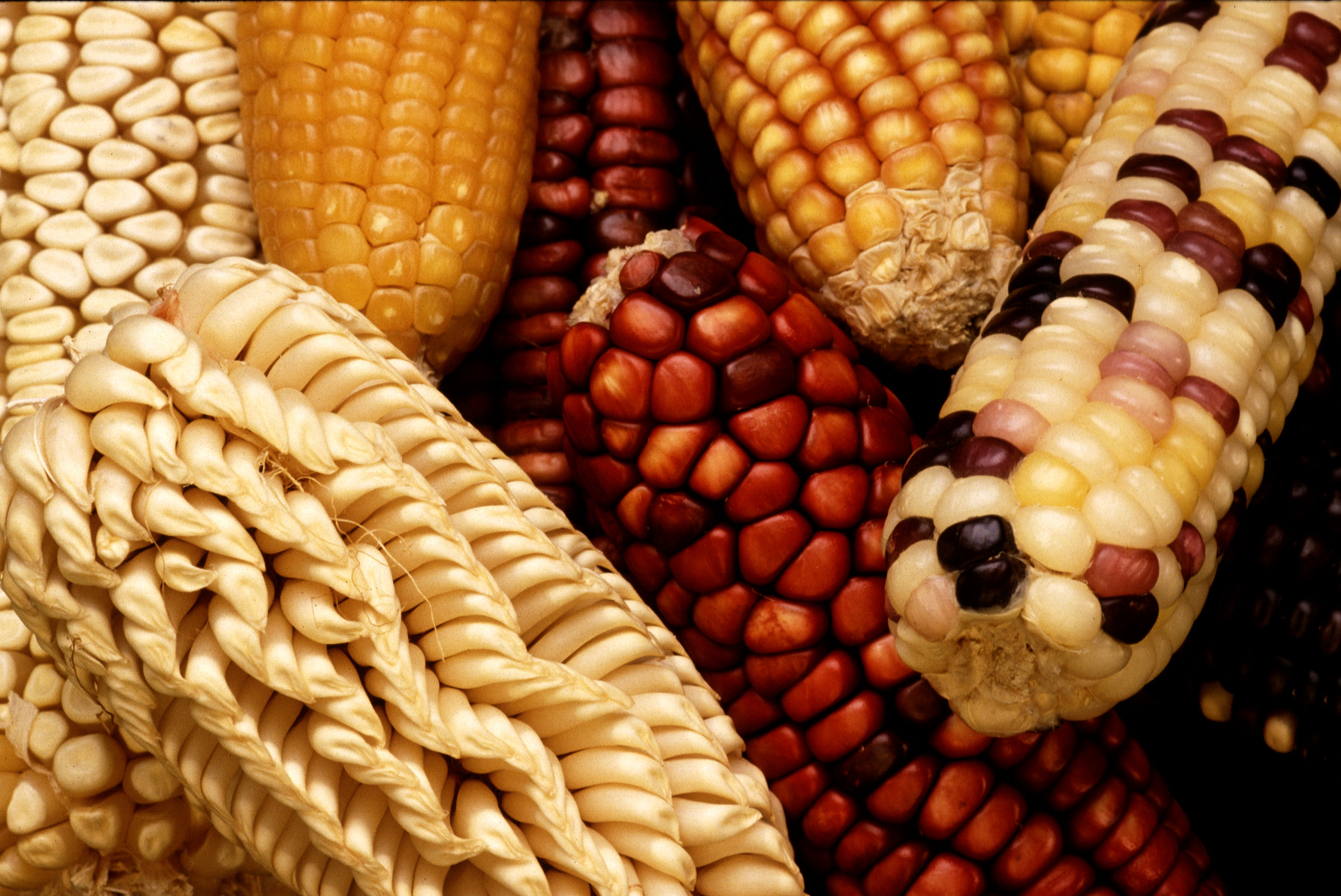
Exotic varieties are collected to add genetic diversity when selectively breeding new domestic strains.

Maize is diploid with 20 chromosomes. 83% of allelic variation within the genome derives from its teosinte ancestors, primarily due to the freedom of Zea species to outcross. Barbara McClintock used maize to validate her transposon theory of "jumping genes", for which she won the 1983 Nobel Prize in Physiology or Medicine. Maize remains an important model organism for genetics and developmental biology. The MADS-box motif is involved in the development of maize flowers.

The Maize Genetics and Genomics Database is funded by the United States Department of Agriculture (USDA) to support maize research. The International Maize and Wheat Improvement Center maintains a large collection of maize accessions tested and cataloged for insect resistance. In 2005, the U.S. National Science Foundation, the USDA, and the Department of Energy formed a consortium to sequence the maize genome. The resulting DNA sequence data was deposited immediately into GenBank, a public repository for genome-sequence data. Sequencing of the maize genome was completed in 2008. In 2009, the consortium published results of its sequencing effort. The genome, 85% of which is composed of transposons, contains 32,540 genes. Much of it has been duplicated and reshuffled by helitrons, a group of transposable elements within maize's DNA.

== Taxonomy ==
=== External phylogeny ===
The maize genus Zea is relatively closely related to sorghum, both being in the PACMAD clade of Old World grasses, and much more distantly to rice and wheat, which are in the other major group of grasses, the BOP clade. It is closely related to Tripsacum, gamagrass.

- (Part of Poaceae)
  - BOP clade
    - - various grasses e.g. fescue, ryegrass
      - - Hordeum (barley)
        - Triticum (wheat)
    - Oryza (rice)
  - PACMAD clade
    - Pennisetum (fountaingrasses)
    - - Sorghum (sorghum)
      - - Tripsacum (gamagrass)
        - Zea
          - Zea mays (maize)
          - other Zea species (teosintes)

=== Maize and teosinte ===
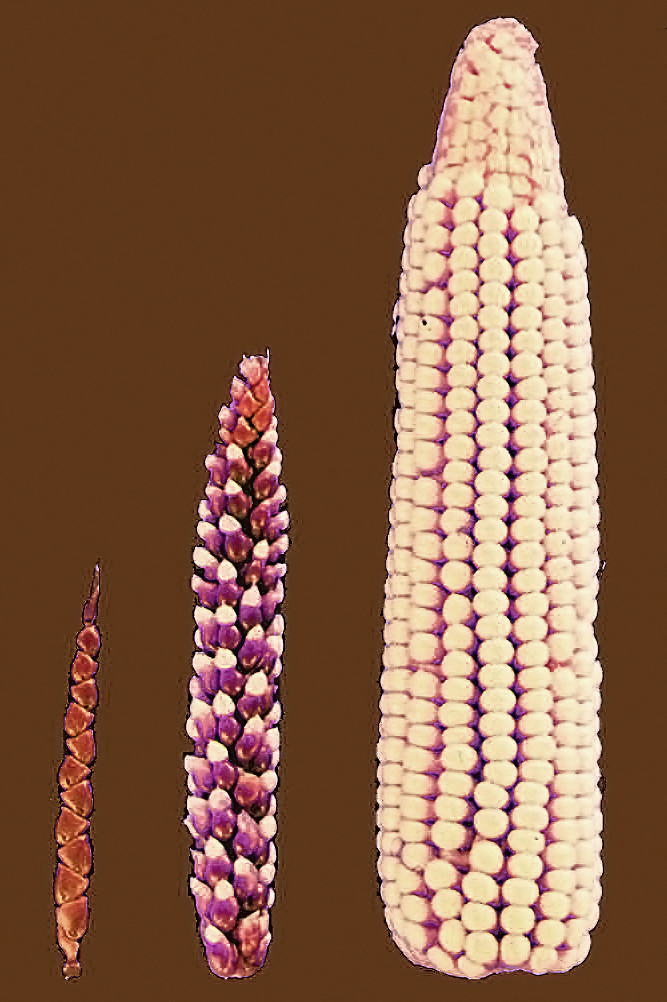
Teosinte (left), maize-teosinte hybrid (middle), maize (right)

Maize is the domesticated variant of the four species of teosintes, which are its crop wild relatives. Teosinte was likely used by hunter-gatherers because it added security to their food supply, being that it was adaptable to changes in climate and environment. The teosinte origin theory was proposed by the Russian botanist Nikolai Ivanovich Vavilov in 1931, and the American Nobel Prize-winner George Beadle in 1932. The two plants have dissimilar appearance, maize having a single tall stalk with multiple leaves and teosinte being a short, bushy plant. The difference between the two is largely controlled by differences in just two genes, called grassy tillers-1 (gt1, A0A317YEZ1) and teosinte branched-1 (tb1, Q93WI2). In the late 1930s, Paul Mangelsdorf suggested that domesticated maize was the result of a hybridization event between an unknown wild maize and a species of Tripsacum, a related genus; this has been refuted by modern genetic testing.

In 2004, John Doebley identified Balsas teosinte, Zea mays subsp. parviglumis, native to the Balsas River valley in Mexico's southwestern highlands, as the crop wild relative genetically most similar to modern maize. The middle part of the short Balsas River valley is the likely location of early domestication. Stone milling tools with maize residue have been found in an 8,700 year old layer of deposits in a cave not far from Iguala, Guerrero. Doebley and colleagues showed in 2002 that maize had been domesticated only once, about 9,000 years ago, and then spread throughout the Americas.

Maize pollen dated to 7,300 years ago from San Andres, Tabasco has been found on the Caribbean coast. A primitive corn was being grown in southern Mexico, Central America, and northern South America 7,000 years ago. Archaeological remains of early maize ears, found at Guila Naquitz Cave in the Oaxaca Valley, are roughly 6,250 years old; the oldest ears from caves near Tehuacan, Puebla, are 5,450 years old.

=== Spreading to the north ===
Around 4,500 years ago, maize began to spread to the north. Maize was first cultivated at several sites in New Mexico and Arizona about 4,100 years ago. During the first millennium AD, maize cultivation spread more widely in the areas north. In particular, the large-scale adoption of maize agriculture and consumption in eastern North America took place about A.D. 900. Native Americans cleared large forest and grassland areas for the new crop. The rise in maize cultivation 500 to 1,000 years ago in what is now the southeastern U.S. corresponded with a decline of freshwater mussels, which are very sensitive to environmental changes.

=== Names ===
The name maize derives from the Spanish form maíz of the Taíno mahis. The Swedish botanist Carl Linnaeus used the common name maize as the species epithet in Zea mays. The name maize is preferred in formal, scientific, and international usage as a common name because it refers specifically to this one grain, unlike corn, which has a complex variety of meanings that vary by context and geographic region. Most countries primarily use the term maize, and the name corn is used mainly in the U.S. and a handful of other English-speaking countries. In countries that primarily use the term maize, the word corn may denote any cereal crop, varying geographically with the local staple, such as wheat in England and oats in Scotland or Ireland. The usage of corn for maize started as a shortening of "Indian corn" in 18th-century North America.

The historian of food Betty Fussell writes in an article on the history of the word corn in North America that "[t]o say the word corn is to plunge into the tragi-farcical mistranslations of language and history". Similar to the British usage, the Spanish referred to maize as panizo, a generic term for cereal grains, as did Italians with the term polenta. The British later referred to maize as Turkey wheat, Turkey corn, or Indian corn; Fussell comments that "they meant not a place but a condition, a savage rather than a civilized grain".

International groups such as the Centre for Agriculture and Bioscience International consider maize the preferred common name. The word maize is used by the UN's Food and Agriculture Organization, and in the names of the International Maize and Wheat Improvement Center of Mexico, the Indian Institute of Maize Research, the Maize Association of Australia, the National Maize Association of Nigeria, the National Maize Association of Ghana, the Maize Trust of South Africa, and the Zimbabwe Seed Maize Association. In the United States, maize can be used interchangeably with the term corn.

== Cultivation ==
=== Pre-Columbian development ===
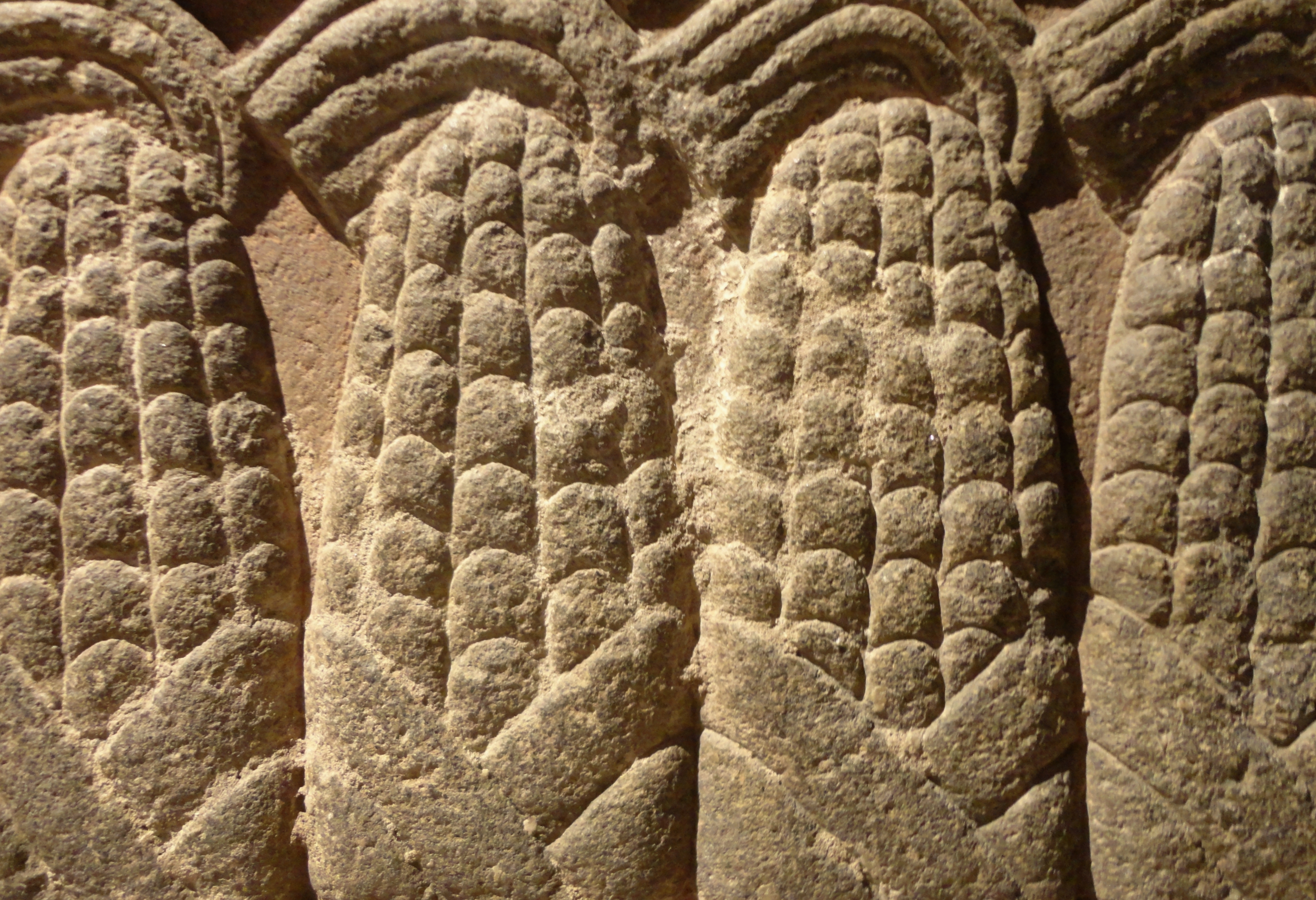
Ancient Mesoamerican relief sculpture of maize, National Museum of Anthropology of Mexico

Maize requires human intervention for its propagation. The kernels of its naturally-propagating teosinte ancestor fall off the cob on their own, while those of domesticated maize do not. All maize arose from a single domestication in southern Mexico about 9,000 years ago. The oldest surviving maize types are those of the Mexican highlands. Maize spread from this region to the lowlands and over the Americas along two major paths. The centre of domestication was most likely the Balsas River valley of south-central Mexico. Maize reached highland Ecuador at least 8000 years ago. It reached lower Central America by 7,600 years ago, and the valleys of the Colombian Andes between 7,000 and 6,000 years ago.

The earliest maize plants grew a single, small ear per plant. The Olmec and Maya cultivated maize in numerous varieties throughout Mesoamerica; they cooked, ground and processed it through nixtamalization. By 3000 years ago, maize was central to Olmec culture, including their calendar, language, and myths.

The Mapuche people of south-central Chile cultivated maize along with quinoa and potatoes in pre-Hispanic times. Before the expansion of the Inca Empire, maize was traded and transported as far south as 40° S in Melinquina, Lácar Department, Argentina, probably brought across the Andes from Chile.

=== Columbian exchange ===
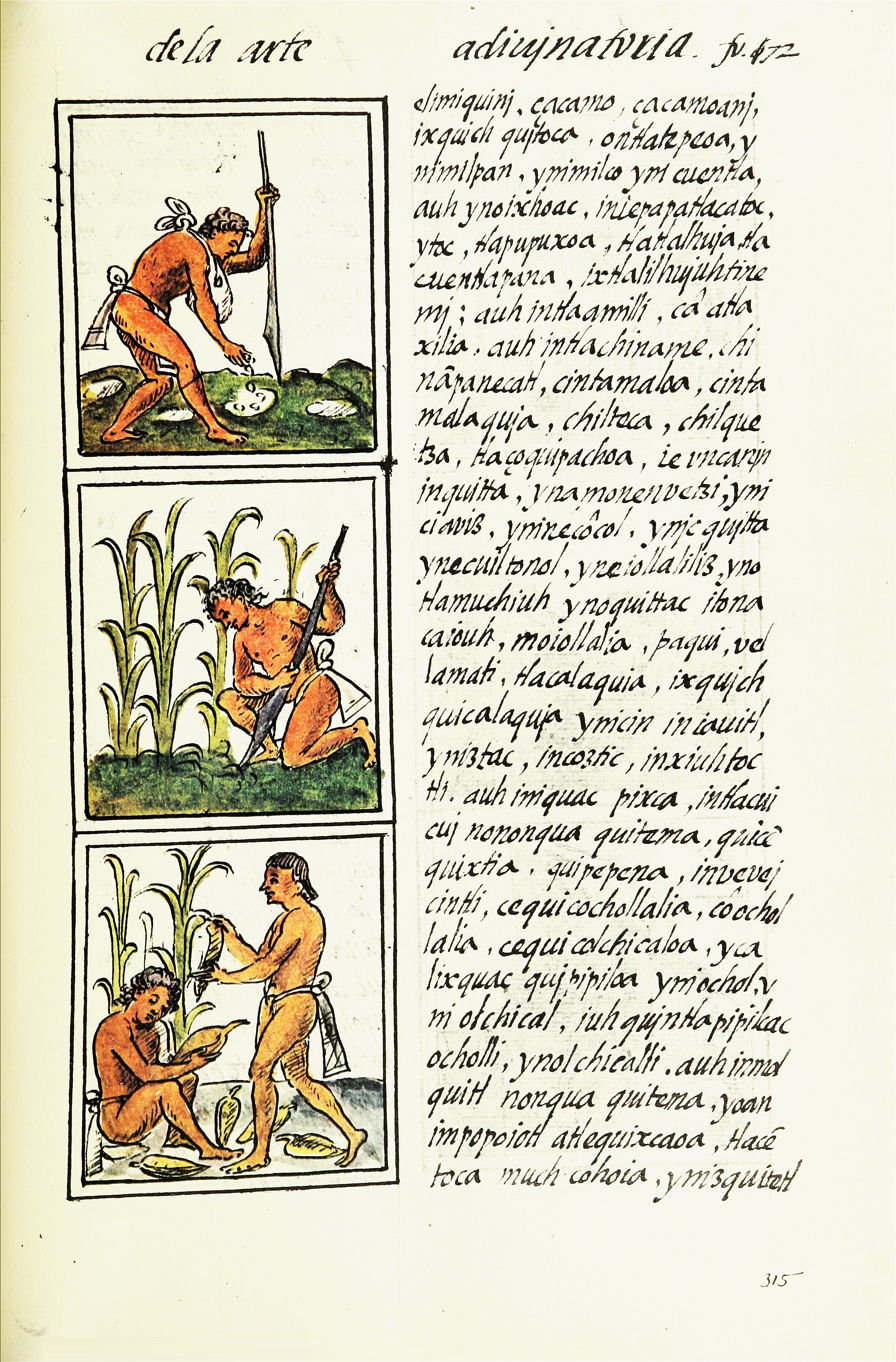
Cultivation of maize, illustrated in the 16th-century Florentine Codex

After the arrival of Europeans in 1492, Spanish settlers consumed maize, and explorers and traders carried it back to Europe. Spanish settlers much preferred wheat bread to maize. Maize flour could not be substituted for wheat for communion bread, since in Christian belief at that time only wheat could undergo transubstantiation and be transformed into the body of Christ.

Maize spread to the rest of the world because of its ability to grow in diverse climates. It was cultivated in Spain just a few decades after Columbus's voyages and then spread to Italy, West Africa, the Philippines and elsewhere. By the 17th century, it was a common peasant food in Southern Europe. By the 18th century, it was the chief food of the southern French and Italian peasantry, especially as polenta in Italy.

When maize was introduced into Western farming systems, it was welcomed for its productivity. However, a widespread problem of malnutrition soon arose wherever it had become a staple food. Indigenous Americans had learned to soak maize in alkali-water – made with ashes and lime – since at least 1200–1500 BC, creating the process of nixtamalization. They did this to liberate the corn hulls, but coincidentally it also liberated the B-vitamin niacin, the lack of which caused pellagra. Once alkali processing and dietary variety were understood and applied, pellagra disappeared in the developed world. The development of high-lysine maize and the promotion of a more balanced diet have contributed to its demise. Pellagra still exists in food-poor areas and refugee camps where people survive on donated maize.

=== Conventional breeding ===
Maize breeding in prehistory resulted in large plants producing large ears. Modern breeding began with individuals who selected highly productive varieties in their fields and then sold seed to other farmers. James L. Reid was one of the earliest and most successful, developing Reid's Yellow Dent in the 1860s. These early efforts were based on mass selection (a row of plants is grown from seeds of one parent), and the choosing of plants after pollination (which means that only the female parents are known). Later breeding efforts included ear to row selection (C. G. Hopkins c. 1896), hybrids made from selected inbred lines (G. H. Shull, 1909), and the highly successful double cross hybrids using four inbred lines (D. F. Jones c. 1918, 1922). University-supported breeding programs were especially important in developing and introducing modern hybrids.

Since the 1940s, the best strains of maize have been first-generation hybrids made from inbred strains that have been optimized for specific traits, such as yield, nutrition, drought, pest and disease tolerance. Both conventional cross-breeding and genetic engineering have succeeded in increasing output and reducing the need for cropland, pesticides, water and fertilizer. There is conflicting evidence to support the hypothesis that maize yield potential has increased over the past few decades. This suggests that changes in yield potential are associated with leaf angle, lodging resistance, tolerance of high plant density, disease/pest tolerance, and other agronomic traits rather than increase of yield potential per individual plant.

Certain varieties of maize have been bred to produce many ears; these are the source of the "baby corn" used as a vegetable in Asian cuisine. A fast-flowering variety named mini-maize was developed to aid scientific research, as multiple generations can be obtained in a single year. One strain called olotón has evolved a symbiotic relationship with nitrogen-fixing microbes, which provides the plant with 29%–82% of its nitrogen. The International Maize and Wheat Improvement Center (CIMMYT) operates a conventional breeding program to provide optimized strains. The program began in the 1980s. Hybrid seeds are distributed in Africa by its Drought Tolerant Maize for Africa project.

Tropical landraces remain an important and underused source of resistance alleles – both those for disease and for herbivores. Such alleles can then be introgressed into productive varieties. Rare alleles for this purpose were discovered by Dao and Sood, both in 2014. In 2018, Zerka Rashid of CIMMYT used its association mapping panel, developed for tropical drought tolerance traits. to find new genomic regions providing sorghum downy mildew resistance, and to further characterize known differentially methylated regions.

=== Genetic engineering ===
Genetically modified maize was one of the 26 genetically engineered food crops grown commercially in 2016. The vast majority of this is Bt maize. Genetically modified maize has been grown since 1997 in the United States and Canada; by 2016, 92% of the U.S. maize crop was genetically modified. As of 2011, herbicide-tolerant maize and insect-resistant maize varieties were each grown in over 20 countries.

In September 2000, up to $50 million worth of food products were recalled due to the presence of Starlink genetically modified corn, which had been approved only for animal consumption.

=== Growing ===
Because it is cold-intolerant, in the temperate zones maize must be planted in the spring. Its root system is generally shallow, so the plant is dependent on soil moisture. As a plant that uses C_{4} carbon fixation, maize is a considerably more water-efficient crop than plants that use C_{3} carbon fixation such as alfalfa and soybeans. Maize is most sensitive to drought at the time of silk emergence, when the flowers are ready for pollination. In the United States, a good harvest was traditionally predicted if the maize was "knee-high by the Fourth of July", although modern hybrids generally exceed this growth rate. Maize used for silage is harvested while the plant is green and the fruit immature. Sweet corn is harvested in the "milk stage", after pollination but before starch has formed, between late summer and early to mid-autumn. Field maize is left in the field until very late in the autumn to thoroughly dry the grain, and may, in fact, sometimes not be harvested until winter or even early spring. The importance of sufficient soil moisture is shown in many parts of Africa, where periodic drought regularly causes maize crop failure and consequent famine. Although it is grown mainly in wet, hot climates, it can thrive in cold, hot, dry or wet conditions, meaning that it is an extremely versatile crop.

Maize was planted by the Native Americans in small hills of soil, in the polyculture system called the Three Sisters. Maize provided support for beans; the beans provided nitrogen derived from nitrogen-fixing rhizobia bacteria which live on the roots of beans and other legumes; and squashes provided ground cover to stop weeds and inhibit evaporation by providing shade over the soil.

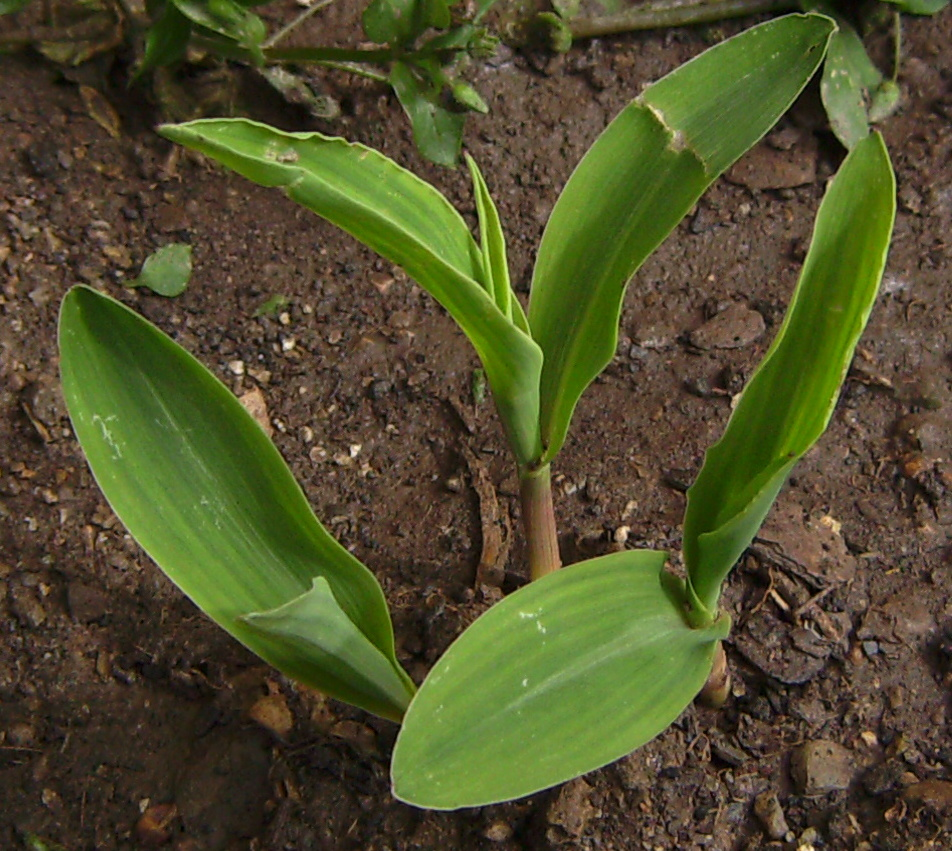
Seedlings three weeks after sowing

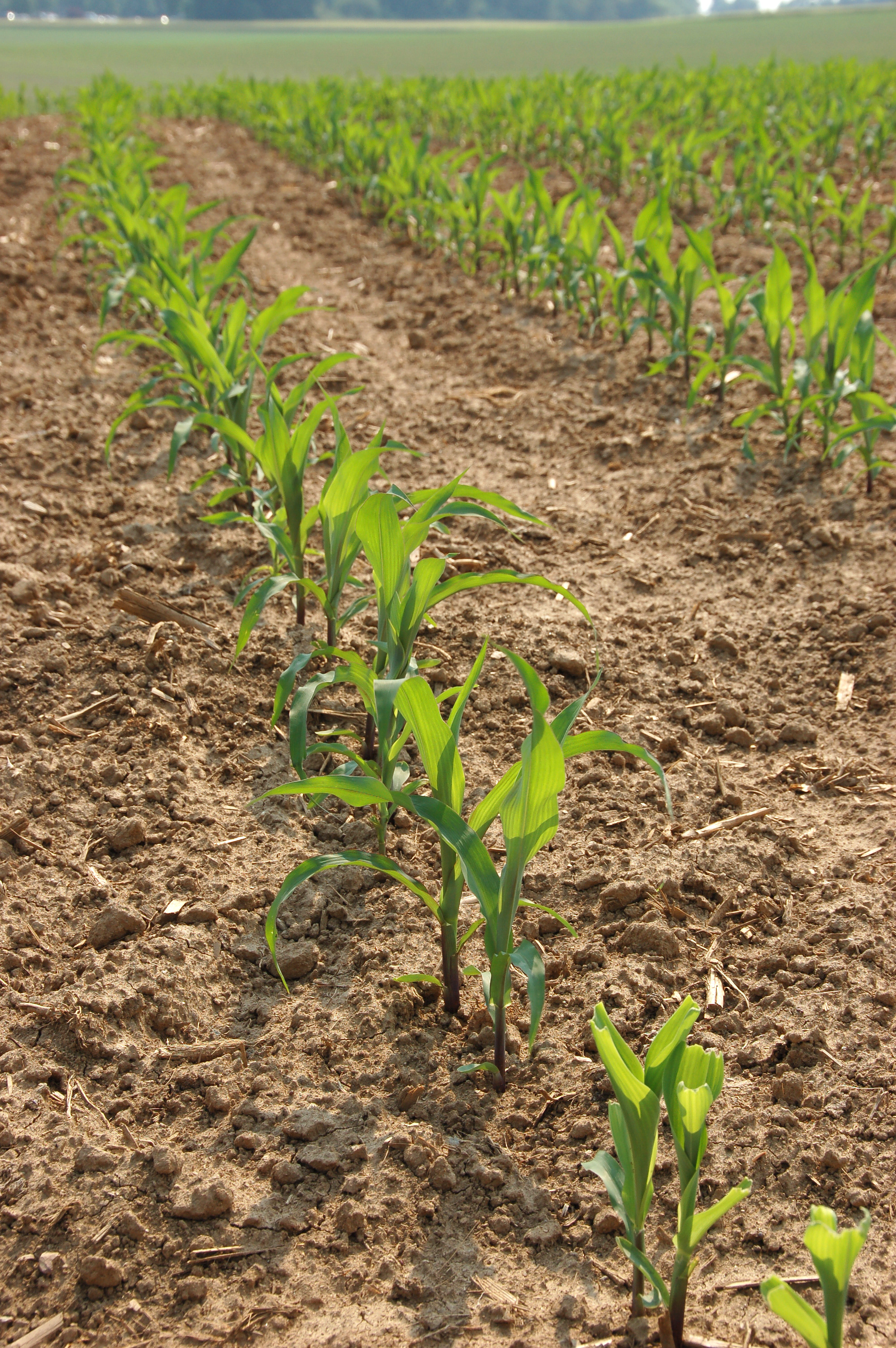
Young stalks

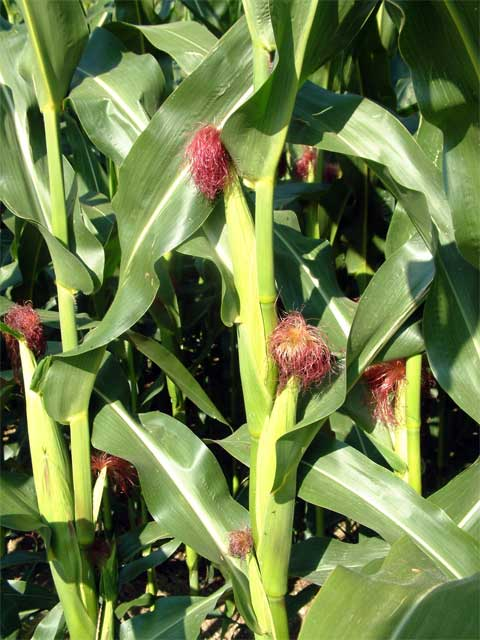
Mature plants showing ears

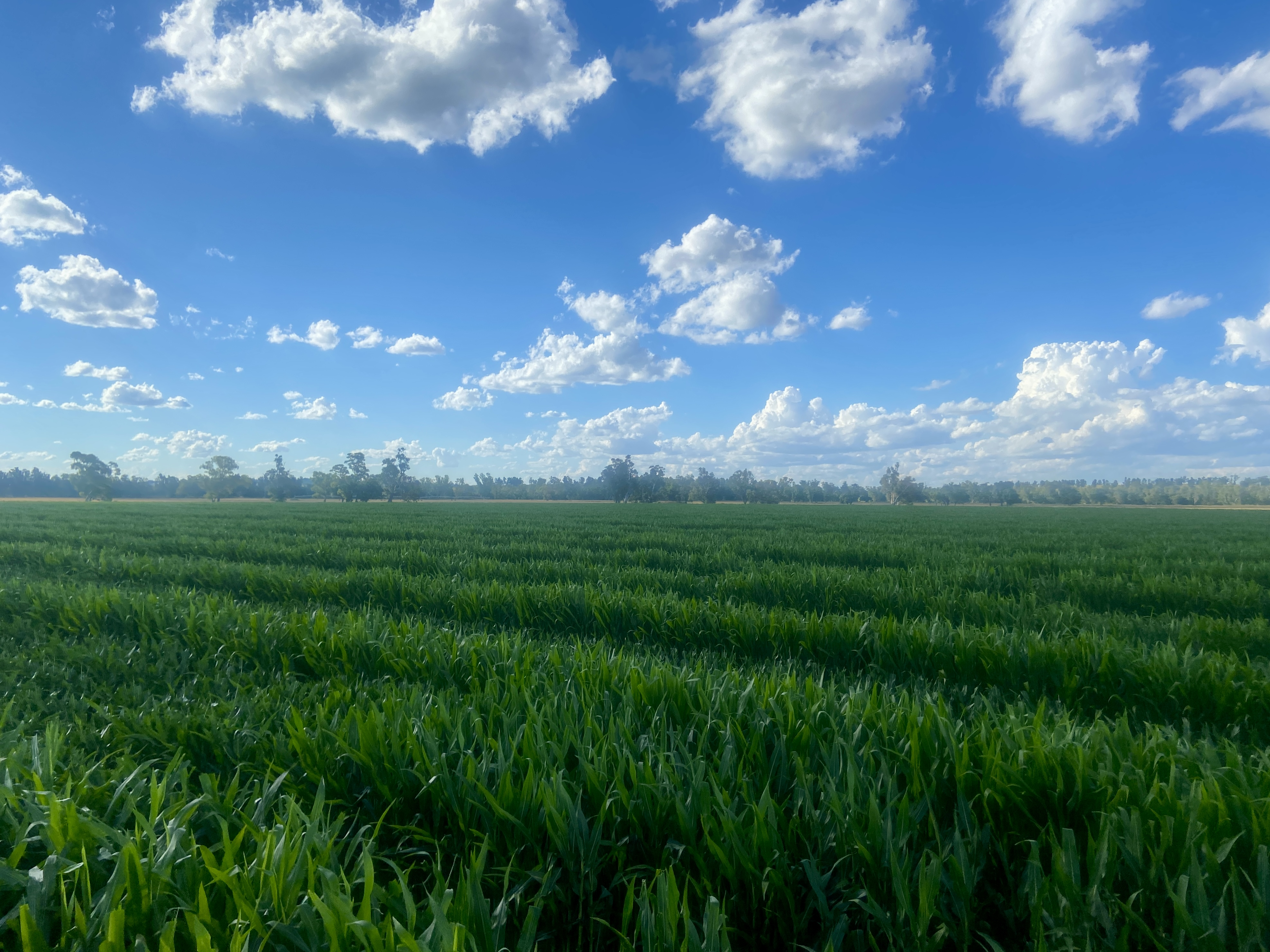
Established broadacre maize seed crop

=== Harvesting ===
Sweet corn, harvested earlier than maize grown for grain, grows to maturity in a period of from 60 to 100 days according to variety. An extended sweet corn harvest, picked at the milk stage, can be arranged either by planting a selection of varieties that ripen earlier and later, or by planting different areas at fortnightly intervals. Maize harvested as a grain crop can be kept in the field a relatively long time, even months, after the crop is ready to harvest; it can be harvested and stored in the husk leaves if kept dry.

According to the U.S. Department of Agriculture, in the four decades from 1855 to 1894 the amount of labor required to produce one bushel of maize declined from four hours and thirty four minutes to only forty-one minutes. Before 1940, most maize in North America was harvested by hand. This involved a large number of workers and associated social events (husking or shucking bees). From the 1850s onward, some machinery became available to partially mechanize the processes, such as one- and two-row mechanical pickers (picking the ear, leaving the stover) and corn binders, which are reaper-binders designed specifically for maize. The latter produce sheaves that can be shocked. By hand or mechanical picker, the entire ear is harvested, which requires a separate operation of a maize sheller to remove the kernels from the ear. Whole ears of maize were often stored in corn cribs, sufficient for some livestock feeding uses. Today corn cribs with whole ears, and corn binders, are less common because most modern farms harvest the grain from the field with a combine harvester and store it in bins. The combine with a corn head (with points and snap rolls instead of a reel) does not cut the stalk; it simply pulls the stalk down. The stalk continues downward and is crumpled into a mangled pile on the ground, where it usually is left to become organic matter for the soil. The ear of maize is too large to pass between slots in a plate as the snap rolls pull the stalk away, leaving only the ear and husk to enter the machinery. The combine separates the husk and the cob, keeping only the kernels.

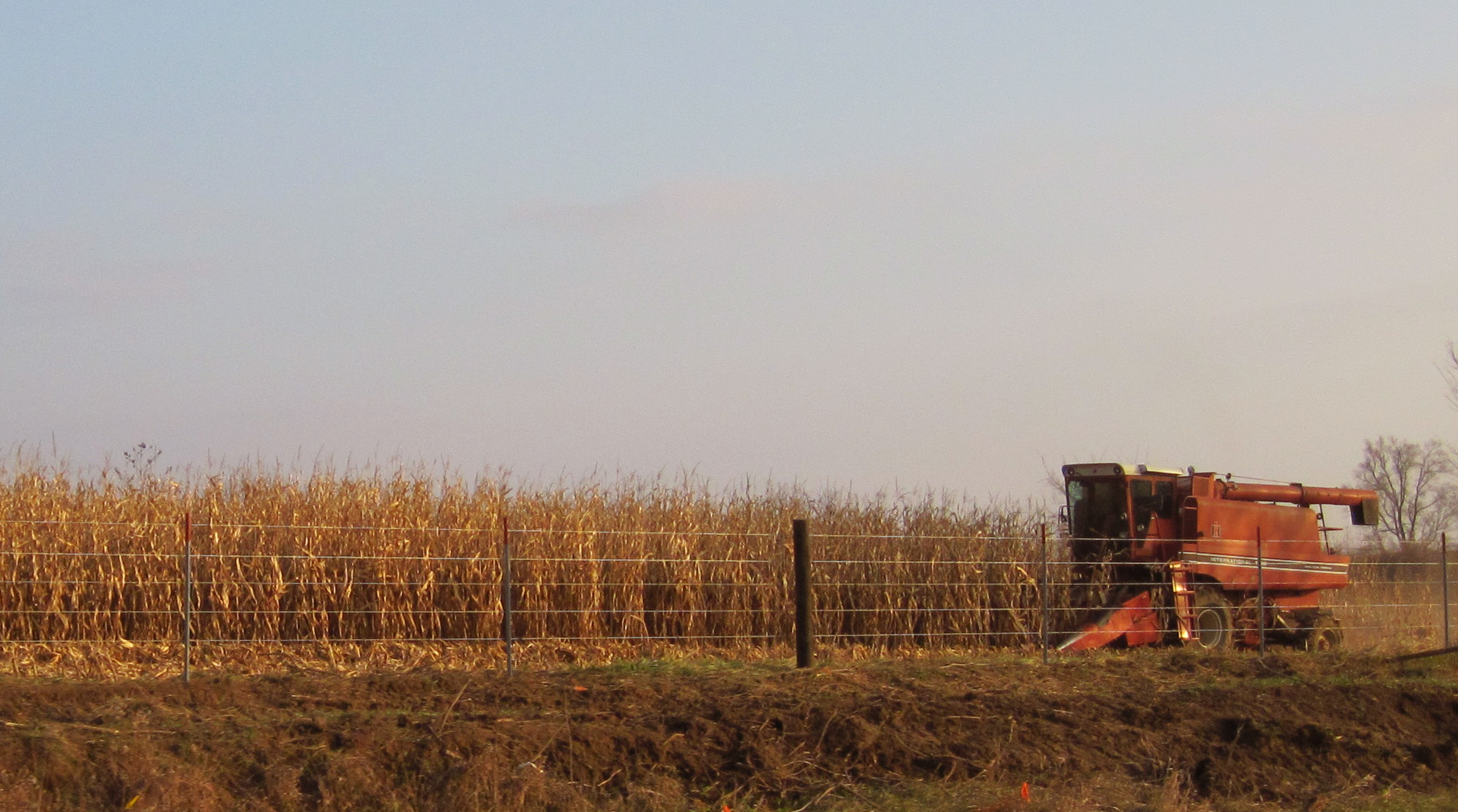
Harvesting maize, Iowa

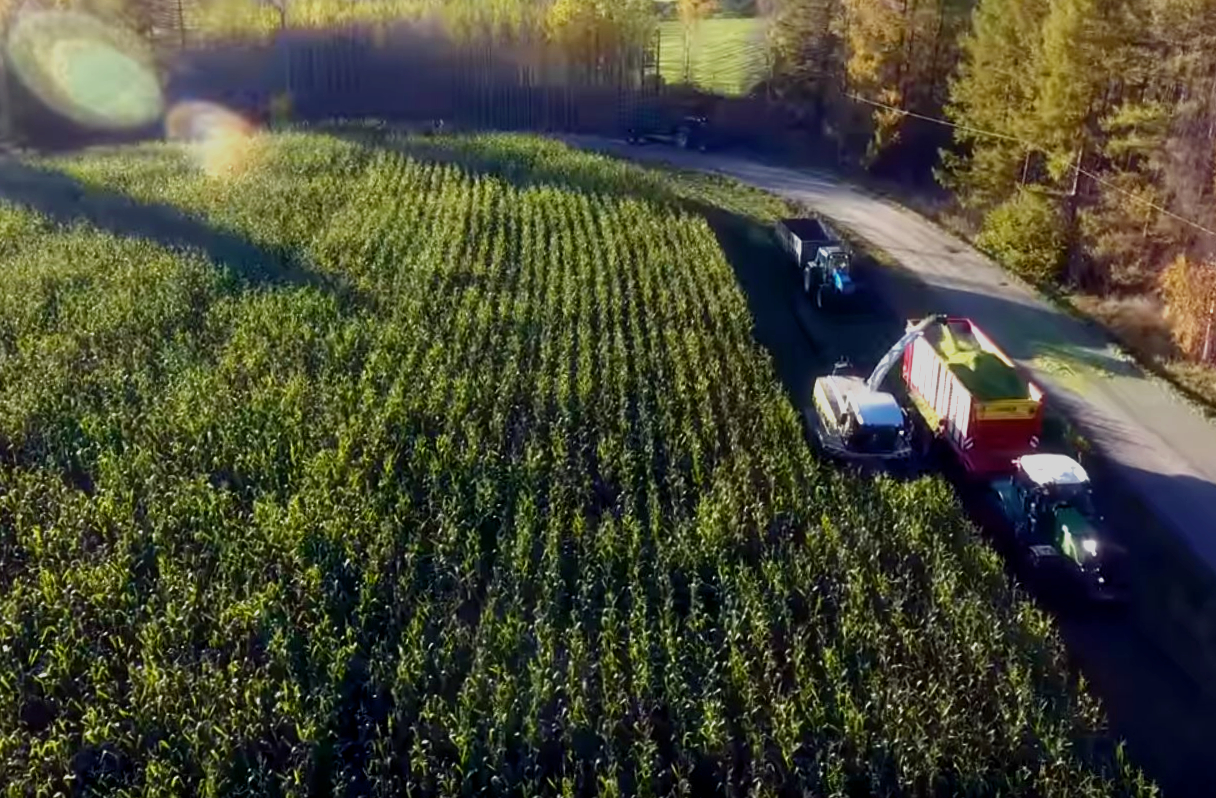
Harvesting maize, Finland

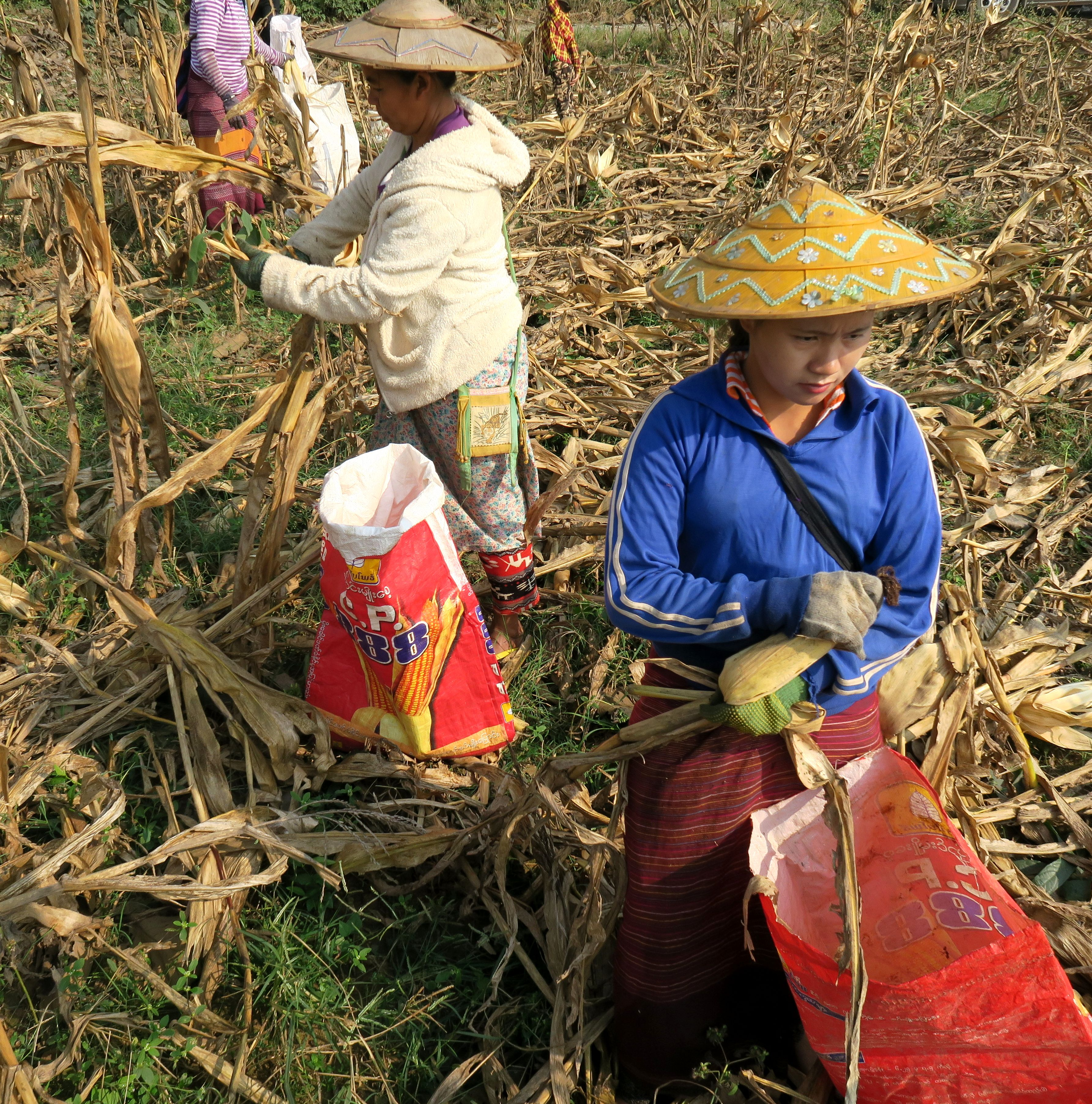
Hand-picking maize, Myanmar

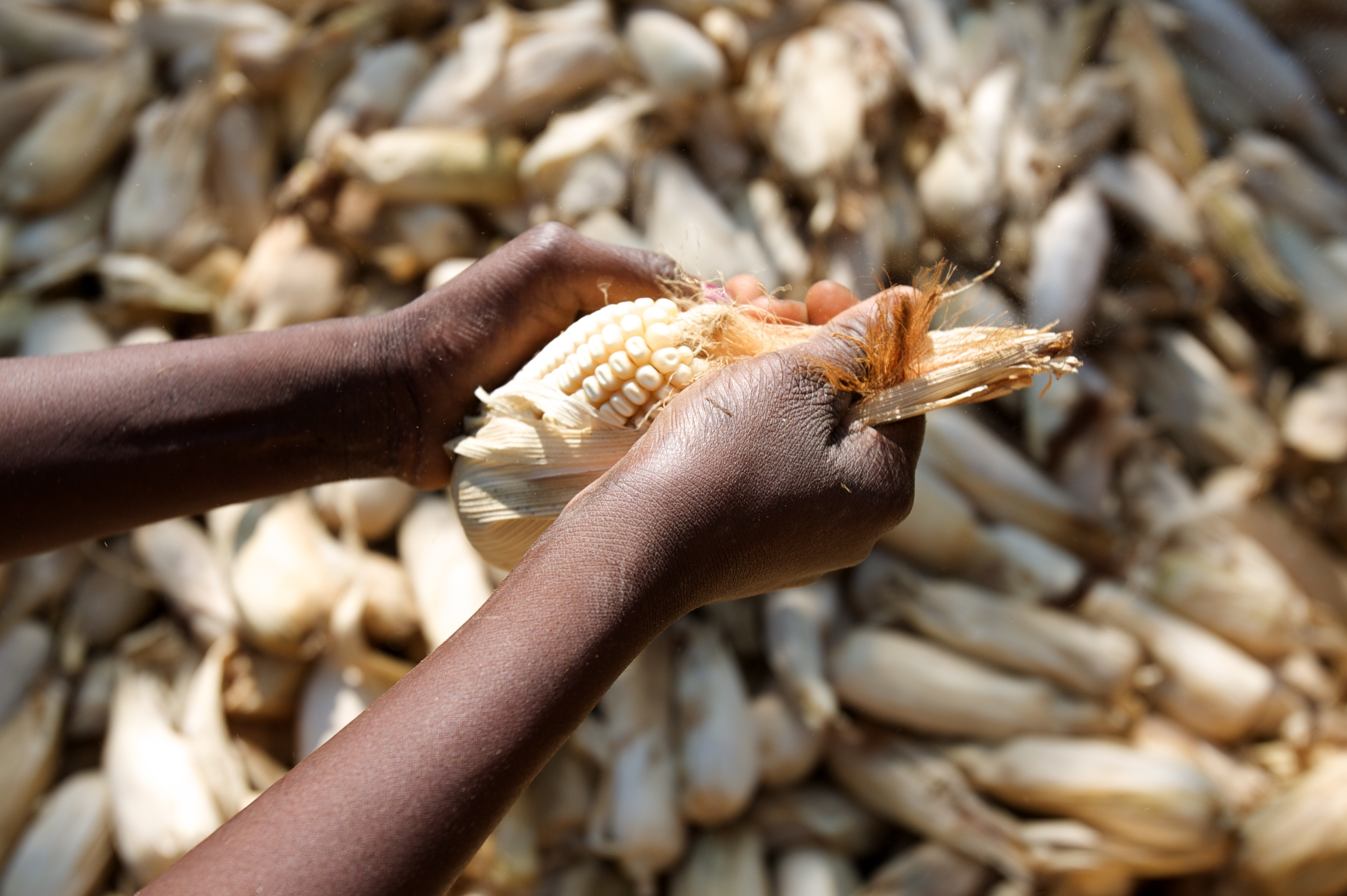
Dehusking maize by hand, Malawi

=== Grain storage ===
Drying is vital to prevent or at least reduce damage by mould fungi, which contaminate the grain with mycotoxins. Aspergillus and Fusarium spp. are the most common mycotoxin sources, and accordingly important in agriculture. If the moisture content of the harvested grain is too high, grain dryers are used to reduce the moisture content by blowing heated air through the grain. This can require large amounts of energy in the form of combustible gases (propane or natural gas) and electricity to power the blowers.

=== Production ===
Maize is widely cultivated throughout the world, and a greater weight of maize is produced each year than any other grain. In 2020, total world production was 1.16 billion tonnes, led by the U.S. with 31.0% of the total (table). China produced 22.4% of the global total.

In August 2026, corn futures reached their highest level since July 2023, with prices rising amid expectations of tighter U.S. supplies and strong global demand. The U.S. Department of Agriculture's August 2026 World Agricultural Supply and Demand Estimates report lowered its U.S. corn yield forecast to 180.7 bushels per acre.

Top maize producers
- in 2020

Numbers in million tonnes
- 1. United States: 360.3 (31%)
- 2. China: 260.7 (22.43%)
- 3. Brazil: 104 (8.95%)
- 4. Argentina: 58.4 (5.02%)
- 5. Ukraine: 30.3 (2.61%)
- 6. India: 30.2 (2.6%)
- 7. Mexico: 27.4 (2.36%)
- 8. Indonesia: 22.5 (1.94%)
- 9. South Africa: 15.3 (1.32%)
- 10. Russia: 13.9 (1.2%)
- World total: 1162.4

Maize production

Maize yield gap

Maize yields

Per capita production of maize corn

Production of maize (2023)

Maize (pink strip) is the second most widely produced primary crop, after sugarcane, and the first among grain crops.

=== Pests ===
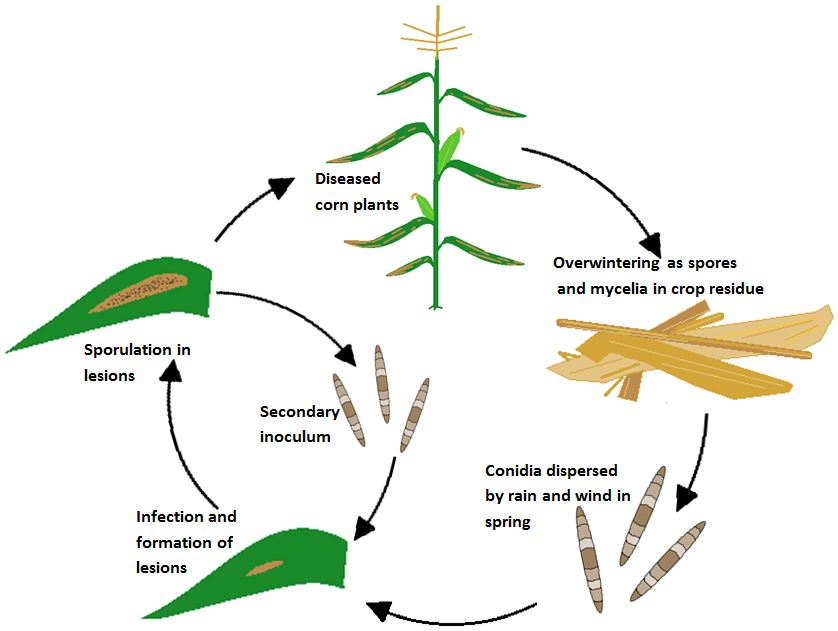
Disease cycle of Northern corn leaf blight

Many pests can affect maize growth and development, including invertebrates, weeds, and pathogens.

Maize is susceptible to a large number of fungal, bacterial, and viral plant diseases. Those of economic importance include diseases of the leaf, smuts such as corn smut, ear rots and stalk rots. Northern corn leaf blight damages maize throughout its range, whereas banded leaf and sheath blight is a problem in Asia. Some fungal diseases of maize produce potentially dangerous mycotoxins such as aflatoxin. In the United States, major diseases include tar spot, bacterial leaf streak, gray leaf spot, northern corn leaf blight, and Goss's wilt; in 2022, the most damaging disease was tar spot, which caused losses of 116.8 million bushels.

Maize sustains a billion dollars' worth of losses annually in the U.S. from each of two major insect pests, namely the European corn borer or ECB (Ostrinia nubilalis) and corn rootworms (Diabrotica spp) western corn rootworm, northern corn rootworm, and southern corn rootworm. Another serious pest is the fall armyworm (Spodoptera frugiperda). The maize weevil (Sitophilus zeamais) is a serious pest of stored grain. The Northern armyworm, Oriental armyworm or Rice ear-cutting caterpillar (Mythimna separata) is a major pest of maize in Asia.

Nematodes too are pests of maize. It is likely that every maize plant harbors some nematode parasites, and populations of Pratylenchus lesion nematodes in the roots can be "enormous". The effects on the plants include stunting, sometimes of whole fields, sometimes in patches, especially when there is also water stress and poor control of weeds.

Many plants, both monocots (grasses) such as Echinochloa crus-galli (barnyard grass) and dicots (forbs) such as Chenopodium and Amaranthus may compete with maize and reduce crop yields. Control may involve mechanical weed removal, flame weeding, or herbicides.

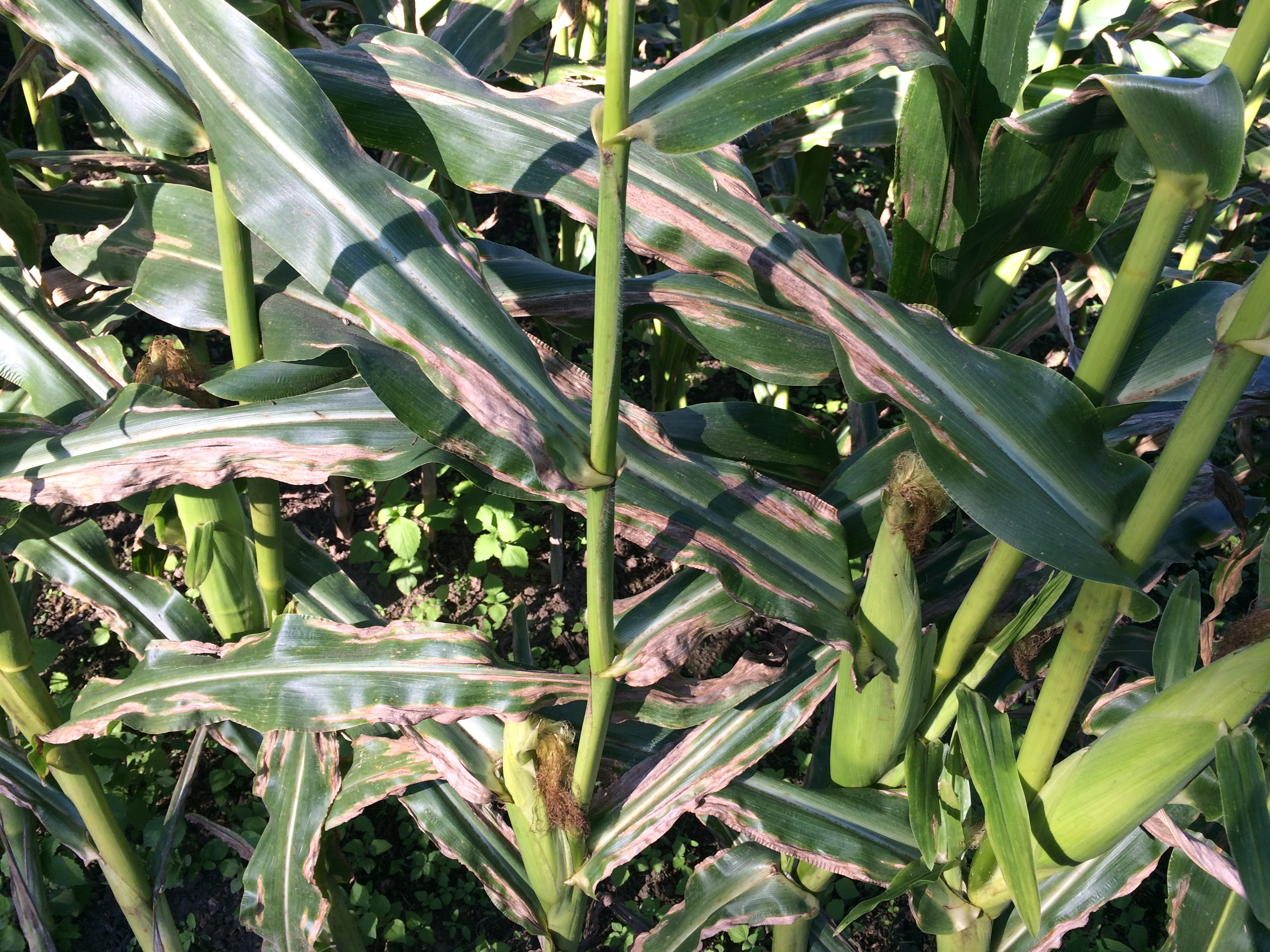
Northern corn leaf blight

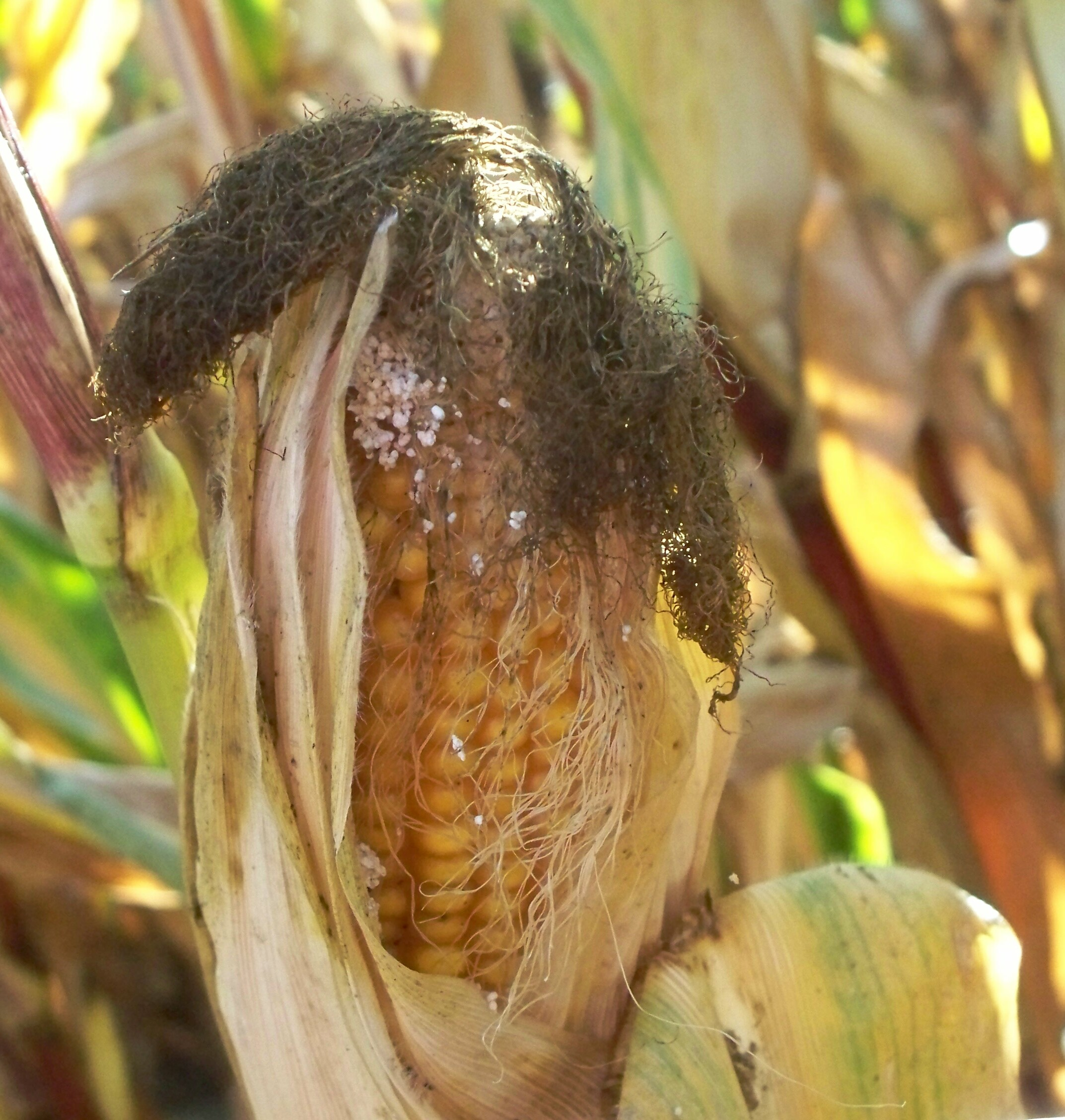
Corncob damage by European corn borer

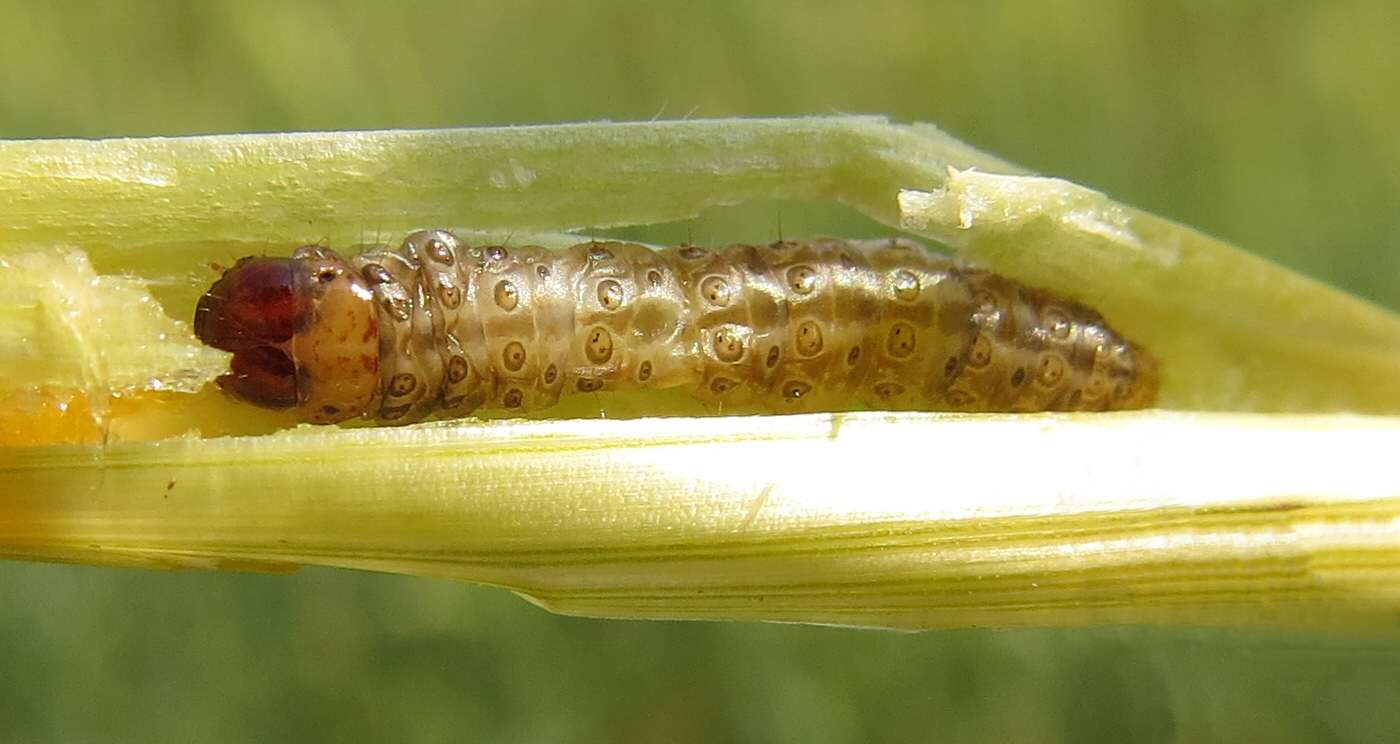
Caterpillar of European corn borer in maize

== Uses ==
=== Culinary ===
Maize and cornmeal (ground dried maize) constitute a staple food in many regions of the world. Maize is used to produce the food ingredient cornstarch. Maize starch can be hydrolyzed and enzymatically treated to produce high fructose corn syrup, a sweetener. Maize may be fermented and distilled to produce Bourbon whiskey. Corn oil is extracted from the germ of the grain.

In prehistoric times, Mesoamerican women used a metate quern to grind maize into cornmeal. Nursing mothers also used maize as a weaning gruel for their children. After ceramic vessels were invented, the Olmec people began to cook maize together with beans, improving the nutritional value of the staple meal. Although maize naturally contains niacin, an important nutrient, it is not bioavailable without the process of nixtamalization. The Maya used nixtamal meal to make porridges and tamales. Maize is a staple of Mexican cuisine. Masa (nixtamal) is the main ingredient for tortillas, atole and many other dishes of Central American cuisine. It is the main ingredient of corn tortilla, tamales, atole and the dishes based on these. The corn smut fungus, known as huitlacoche, which grows on maize, is a Mexican delicacy.

Coarse maize meal is made into a thick porridge in many cultures: from the polenta of Italy, the angu of Brazil, the mămăligă of Romania, to cornmeal mush in the U.S. (or hominy grits in the Southern U.S.) or the food called mieliepap in South Africa and sadza, nshima, ugali and other names in other parts of Africa. Introduced into Africa by the Portuguese in the 16th century, maize has become Africa's most important staple food crop.

Sweet corn, a genetic variety that is high in sugars and low in starch, is eaten in the unripe state as corn on the cob.

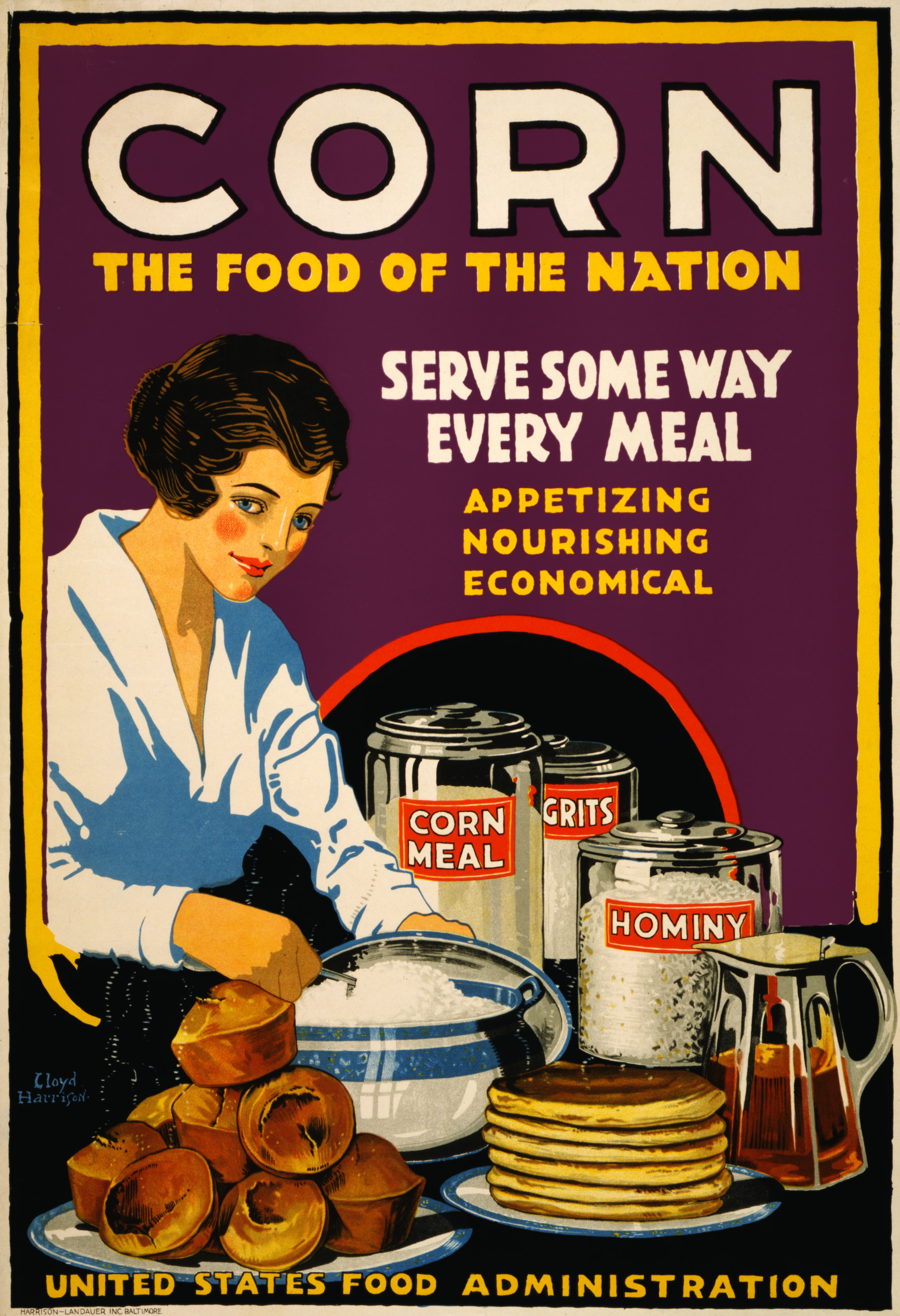
Poster of corn-based foods,
U.S. Food Administration, 1918

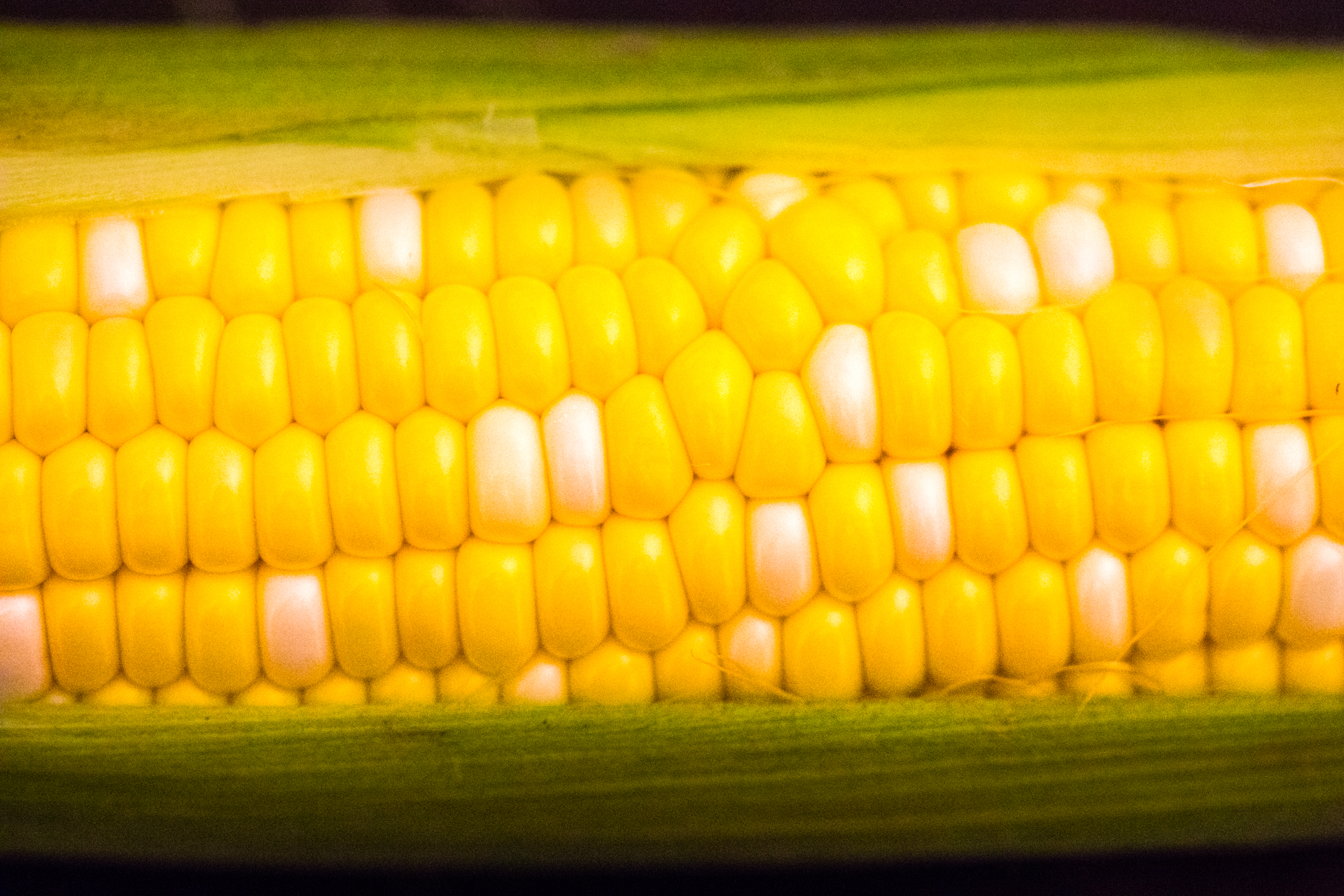
Semi-peeled corn on the cob

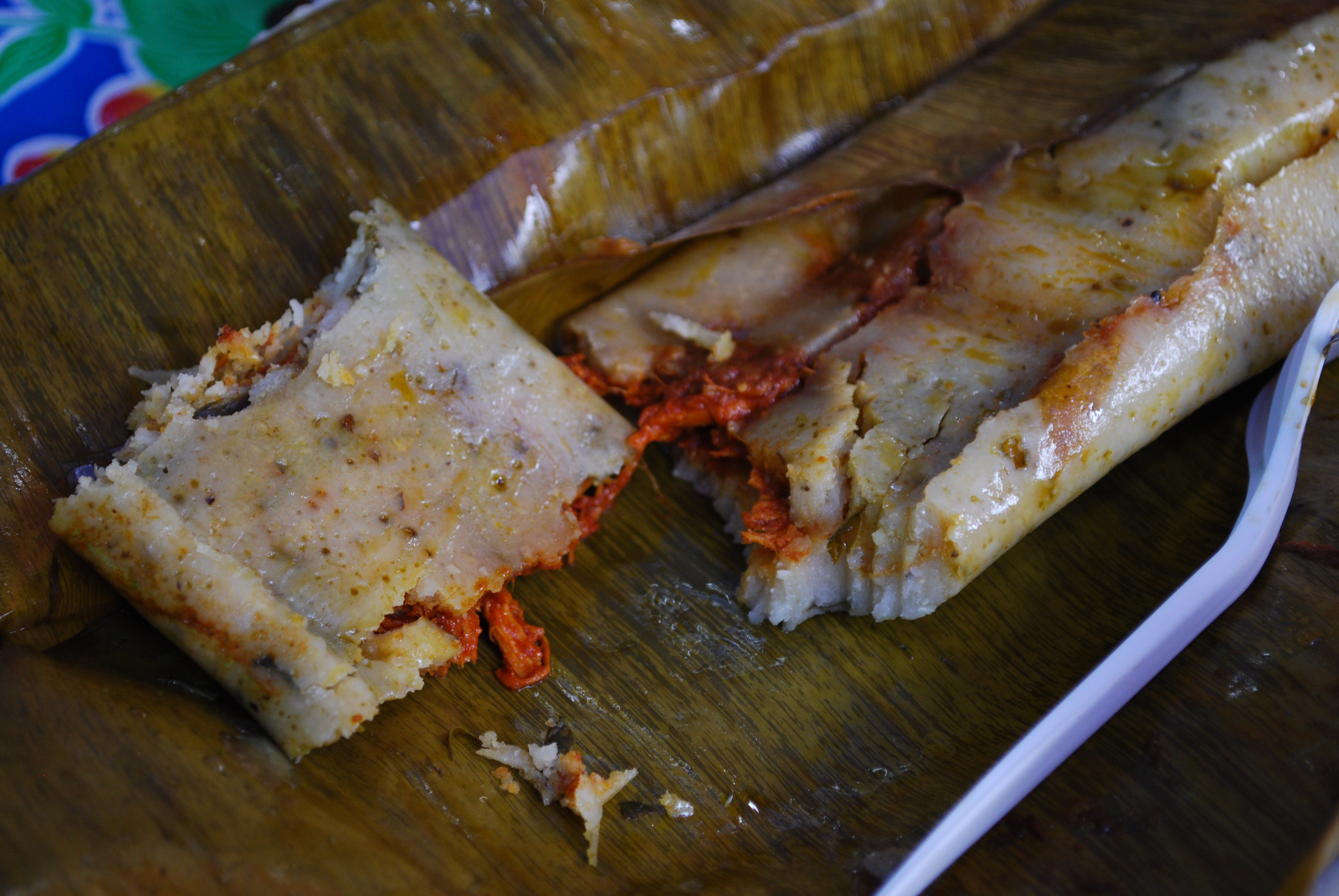
Mexican tamales

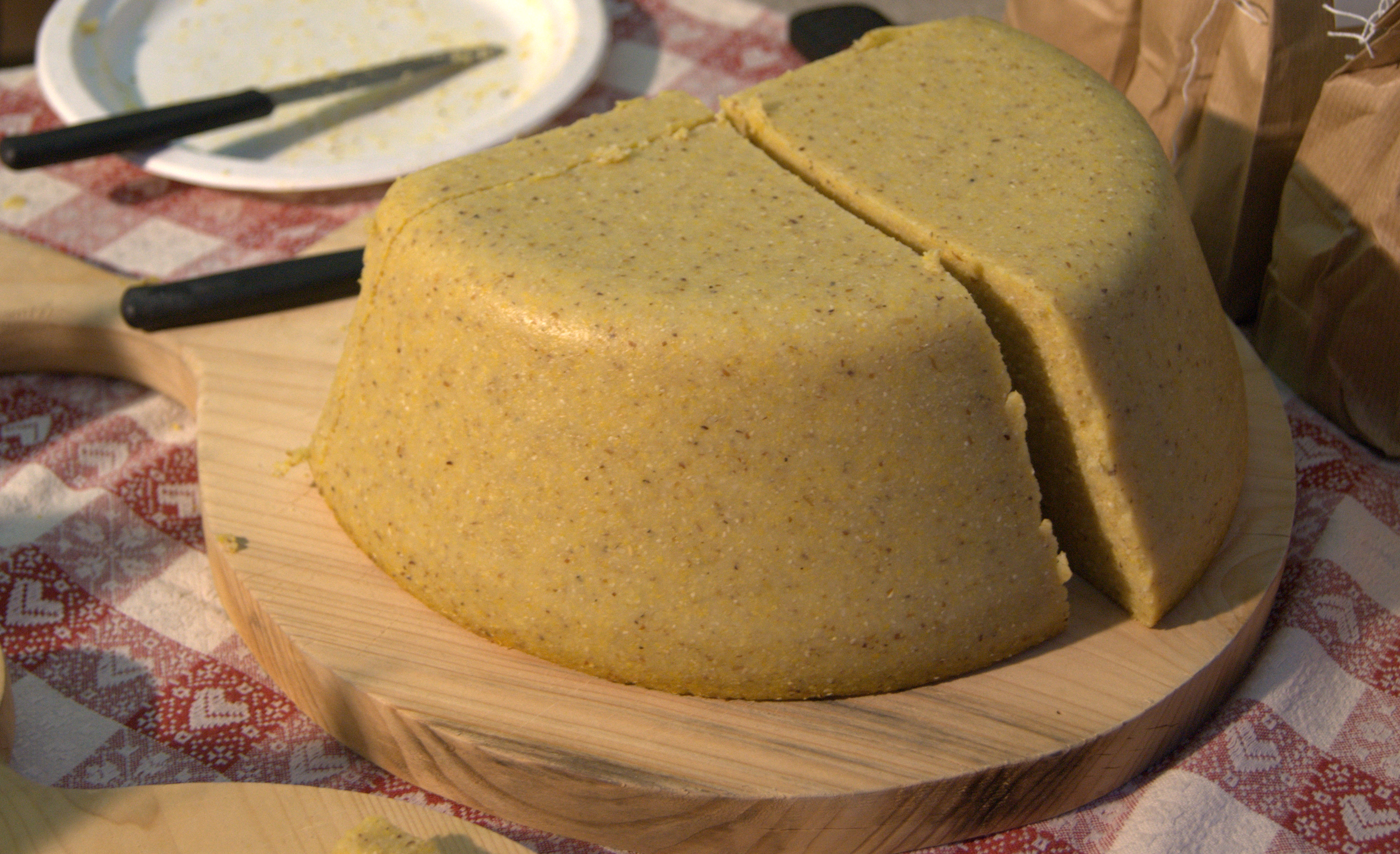
One way of serving Italian polenta

=== Nutritional value ===
Sweetcorn, yellow, raw (seeds only) _{Note: assuming freed niacin}
Nutritional value per 100 g (3.5 oz)
- Energy: 360 kJ (86 kcal)
- Carbohydrates: 18.7 g
- Starch: 5.7 g
- Sugars: 6.26 g
- Dietary fiber: 2 g
- Fat: 1.35 g
- Protein: 3.27 g
Amino acids
Tryptophan	0.023 g
Threonine	0.129 g
Isoleucine	0.129 g
Leucine	0.348 g
Lysine	0.137 g
Methionine	0.067 g
Cystine	0.026 g
Phenylalanine	0.150 g
Tyrosine	0.123 g
Valine	0.185 g
Arginine	0.131 g
Histidine	0.089 g
Alanine	0.295 g
Aspartic acid	0.244 g
Glutamic acid	0.636 g
Glycine	0.127 g
Proline	0.292 g
Serine	0.153 g
Vitamins and minerals
Vitamins	Quantity %DV^{†}
Vitamin A equiv. lutein zeaxanthin	1% 9 μg 644 μg
Thiamine (B1)	13% 0.155 mg
Riboflavin (B2)	4% 0.055 mg
Niacin (B3)	11% 1.77 mg
Pantothenic acid (B5)	14% 0.717 mg
Vitamin B6	5% 0.093 mg
Folate (B9)	11% 42 μg
Vitamin C	8% 6.8 mg
Minerals	Quantity %DV^{†}
Iron	3% 0.52 mg
Magnesium	9% 37 mg
Manganese	7% 0.163 mg
Phosphorus	7% 89 mg
Potassium	9% 270 mg
Zinc	4% 0.46 mg
- Other constituents: Quantity
- Water: 75.96 g
- Link to USDA Database entry One ear of medium size (6-3/4" to 7-1/2" long) maize has 90 grams of seeds.
- ^{†}Percentages estimated using US recommendations for adults, except for potassium, which is estimated based on expert recommendation from the National Academies.

Raw, yellow, sweet maize kernels are composed of 76% water, 19% carbohydrates, 3% protein, and 1% fat. In a 100-gram serving, maize kernels provide 86 calories and are a good source (10–19% of the Daily Value) of the B vitamins, thiamin, niacin (if freed), pantothenic acid (B5) and folate. Maize has suboptimal amounts of the essential amino acids tryptophan and lysine, which accounts for its lower status as a protein source. The proteins of beans and legumes complement those of maize.

=== Animal feed ===
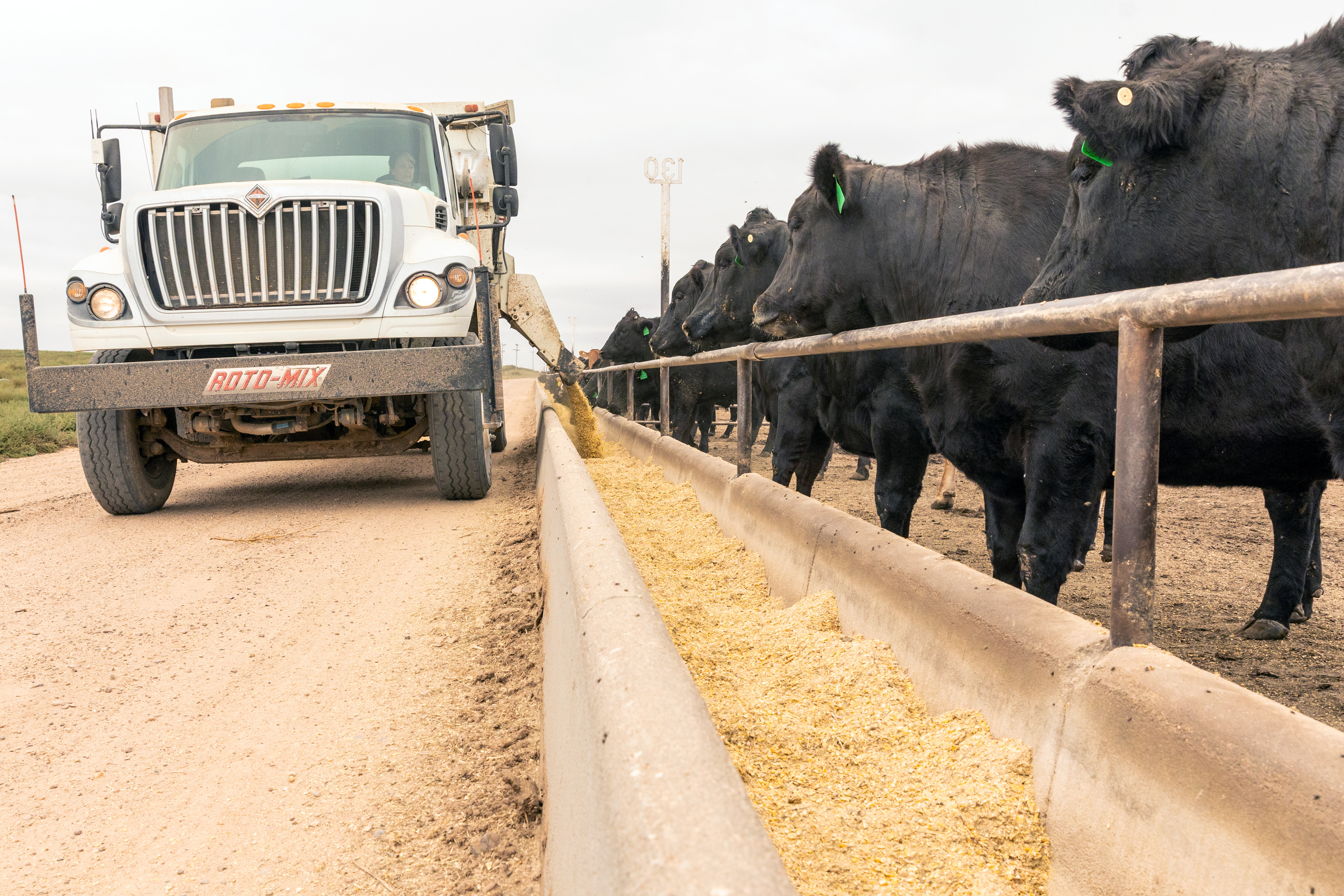
Cattle wait alongside a fence as a truck distributes a grain feed composed of maize by-products into troughs.

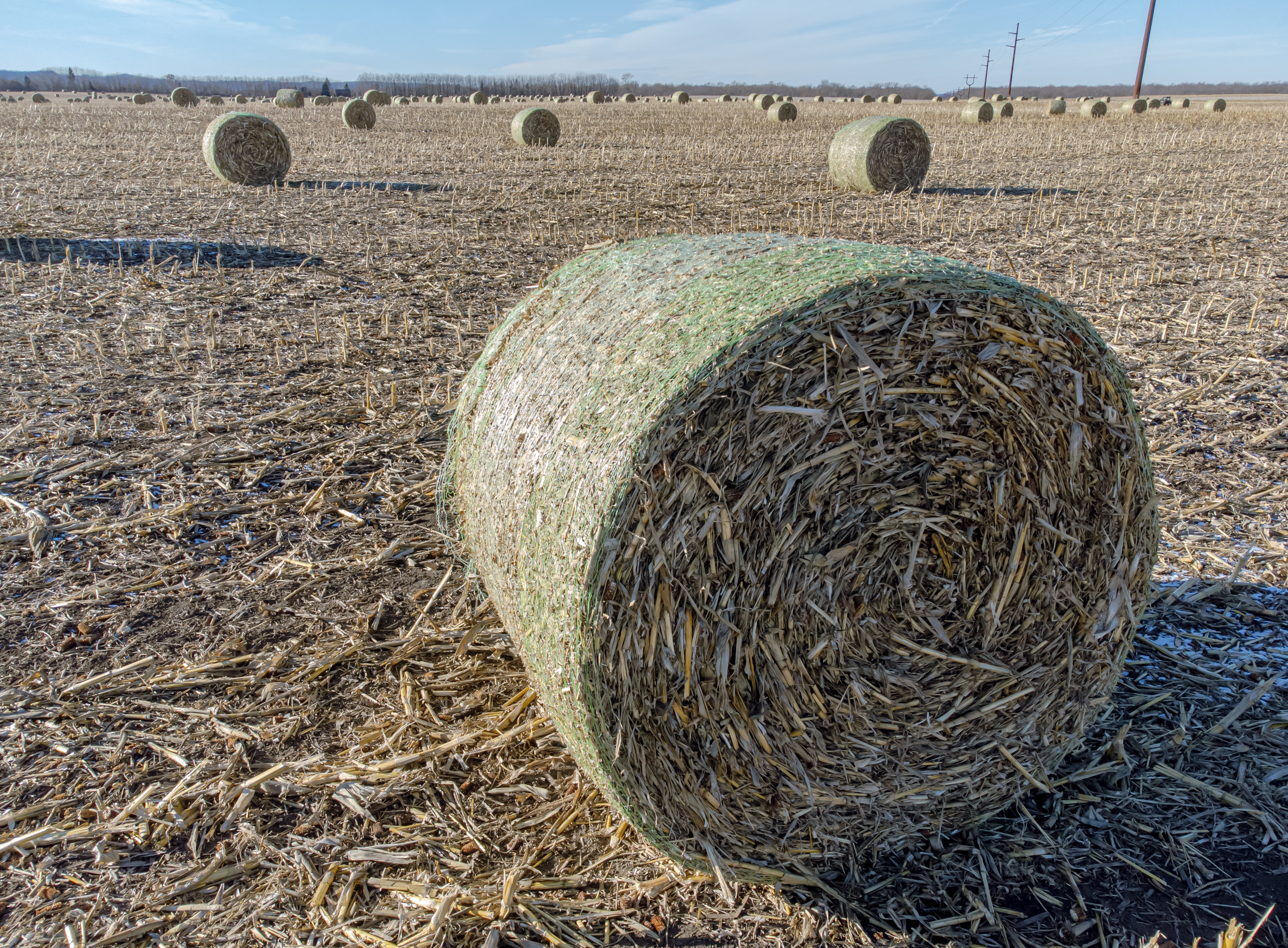
Baled cornstalks

Maize is a major source of animal feed. In the United States, feed is around 40% of total domestic maize use, and around 64% including exports of corn silage and dried distiller grains (ethanol coproducts). As a grain crop, the dried kernels are used as feed. They are often kept on the cob for storage in a corn crib, or they may be shelled off for storage in a grain bin. When the grain is used for feed, the rest of the plant (the corn stover) can be used later as fodder, bedding (litter), or soil conditioner. When the whole plant (grain plus stalks and leaves) is used for fodder, it is usually chopped and made into silage, as this is more digestible and more palatable to ruminants than the dried form. Traditionally, maize was gathered into shocks after harvesting, where it dried further. It could then be stored for months until fed to livestock. Silage can be made in silos or in silage wrappers. In the tropics, maize is harvested year-round and fed as green forage to the animals. Baled cornstalks offer an alternative to hay for animal feed, alongside direct grazing of maize grown for this purpose.

=== Chemicals ===
Starch from maize can be made into plastics, fabrics, adhesives, and many other chemical products. Corn steep liquor, a plentiful watery byproduct of maize wet milling process, is used in the biochemical industry and research as a culture medium to grow microorganisms.

=== Biofuel ===
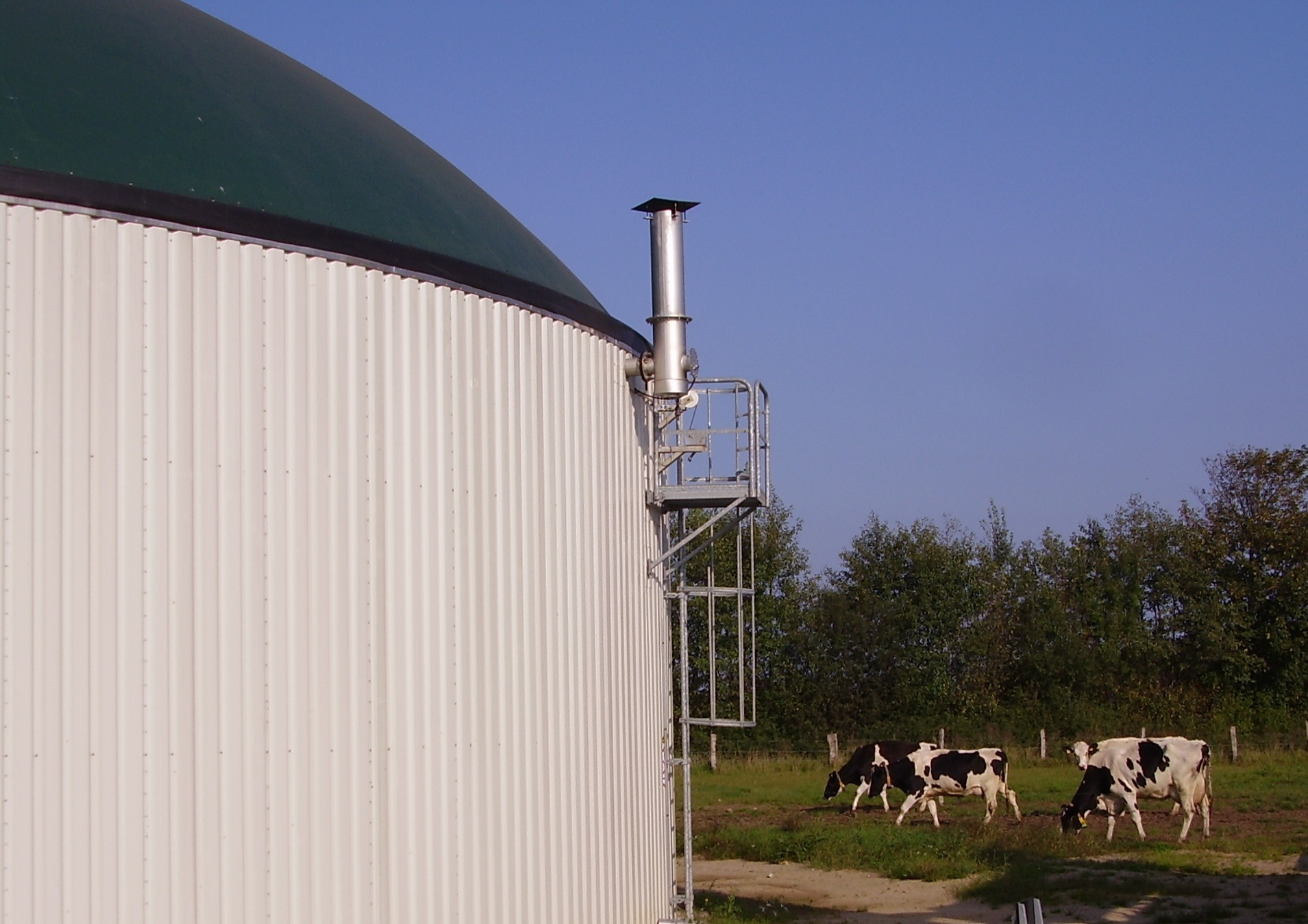
Farm-based maize silage digester near Neumünster, Germany, 2007, using whole maize plants, not just the grain. The green tarpaulin top cover is held up by the biogas stored in the digester.

Feed maize is being used for heating; specialized corn stoves (similar to wood stoves) use either feed maize or wood pellets to generate heat. Maize cobs can be used as a biomass fuel source. Home-heating furnaces which use maize kernels as a fuel have a large hopper that feeds the kernels into the fire. Maize is used as a feedstock for the production of ethanol fuel. The price of food is indirectly affected by the use of maize for biofuel production: such use increases the demand, and therefore the price of maize. A pioneering biomass gasification power plant in Strem, Burgenland, Austria, started operating in 2005. It would be possible to create diesel from the biogas by the Fischer Tropsch method.

== In human culture ==
In Mesoamerica, maize is seen as a vital force, deified as a maize god, usually female. In the U.S., maize ears are carved into column capitals in the U.S. Capitol building. The Corn Palace in Mitchell, South Dakota, uses cobs and ears of colored maize to implement a mural design that is recycled annually. The concrete Field of Corn sculpture in Dublin, Ohio depicts hundreds of ears of corn in a grassy field. A maize stalk with two ripe ears is depicted on the reverse of the Croatian 1 lipa coin, minted since 1993.

Maize kernels have sometimes denoted cowardice, as maize is fed to chickens, which symbolise cowards. In the months before the 1973 Chilean coup d'etat anti-Allende protestors threw maize at military barracks in a call to depose him.

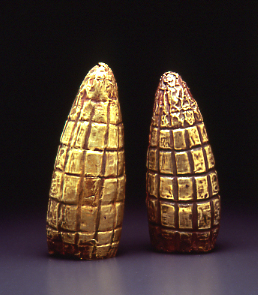
Maize sculpture, Moche culture, 300 AD, Larco Museum, Lima, Peru

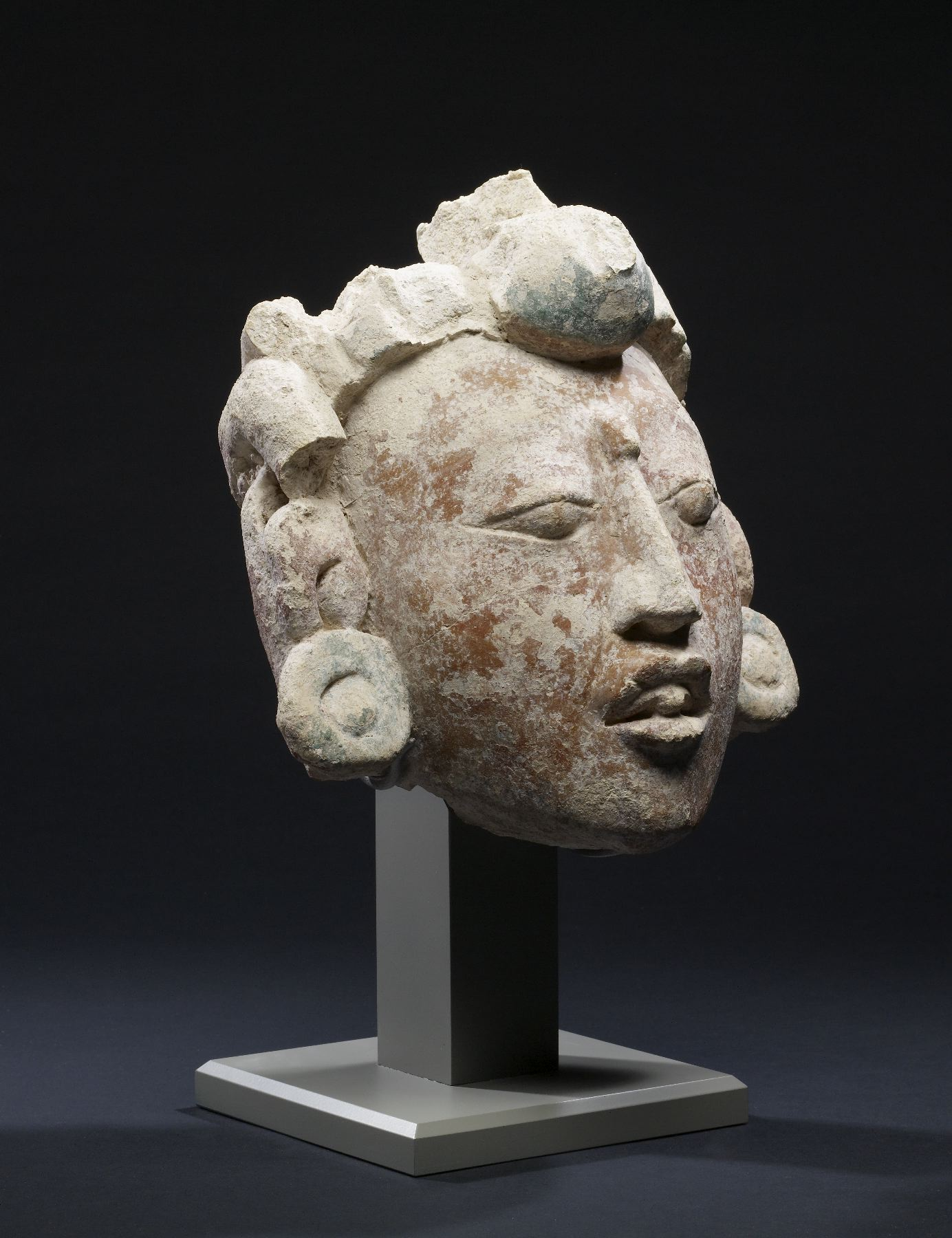
Stucco head of the Maya maize god from Campeche, Mexico, 550–850 AD

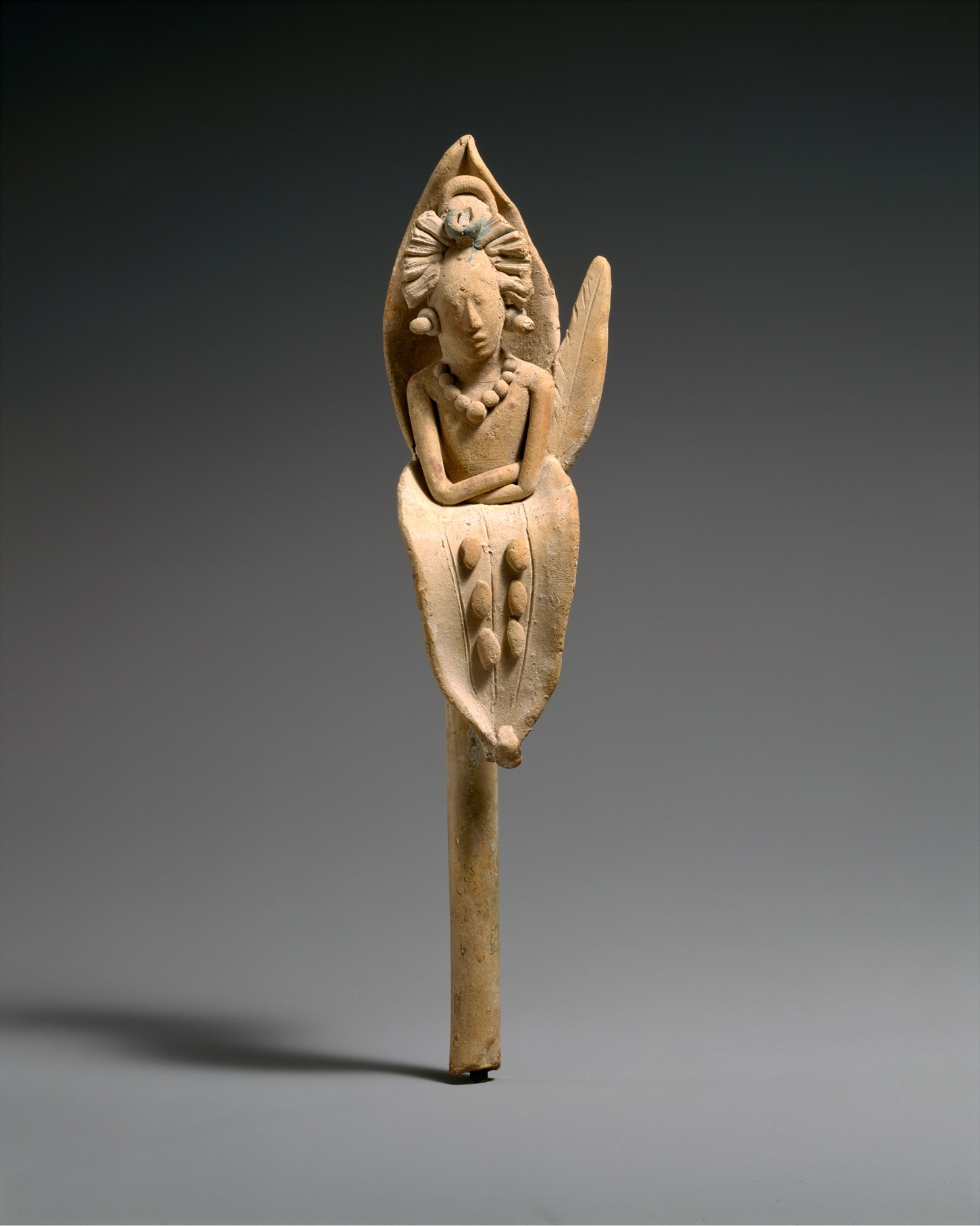
Jaina Island ceramic statuette of the young Maya maize god emerging from an ear of corn, 600–900 AD

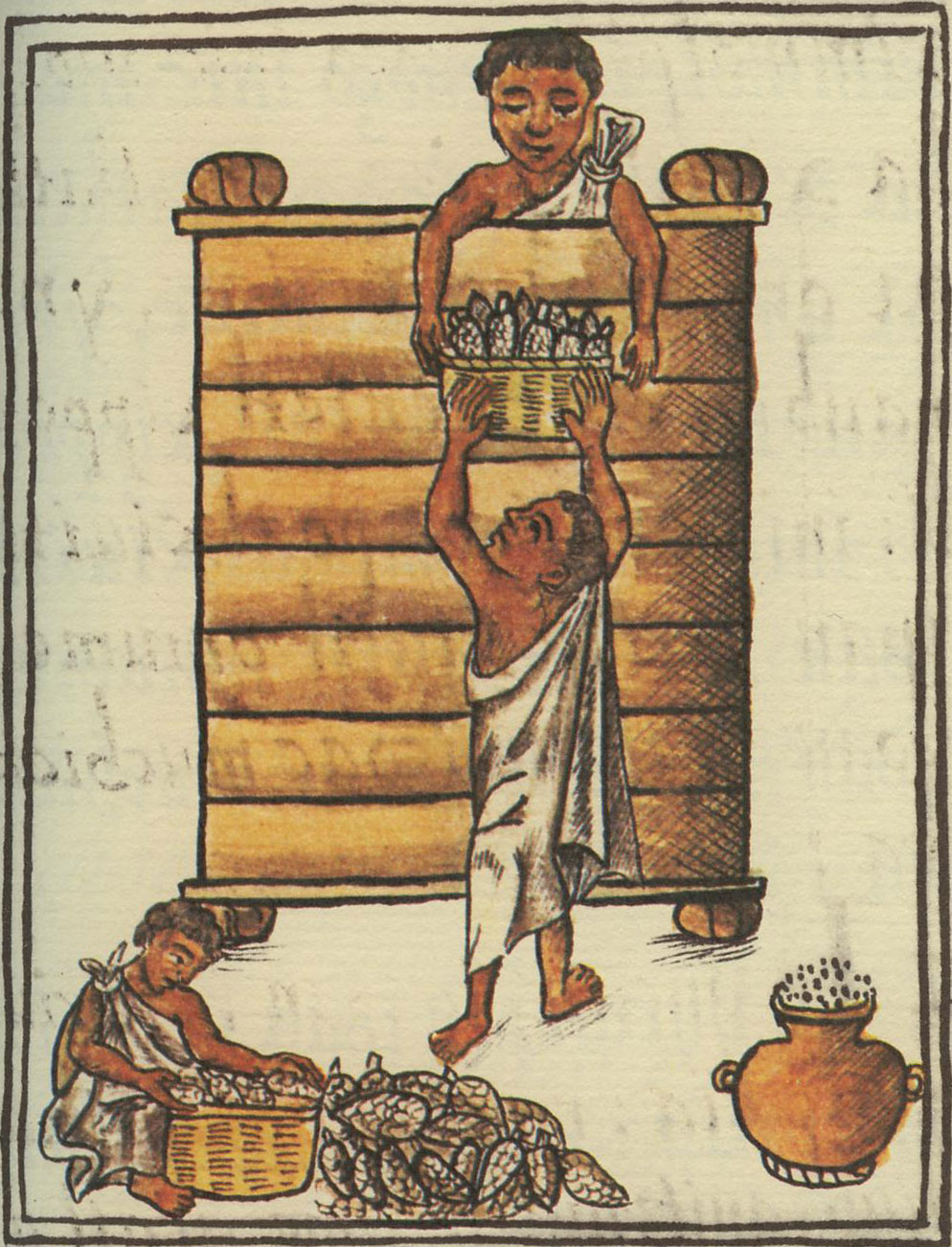
Aztecs storing maize,
Florentine Codex, 1540/1585

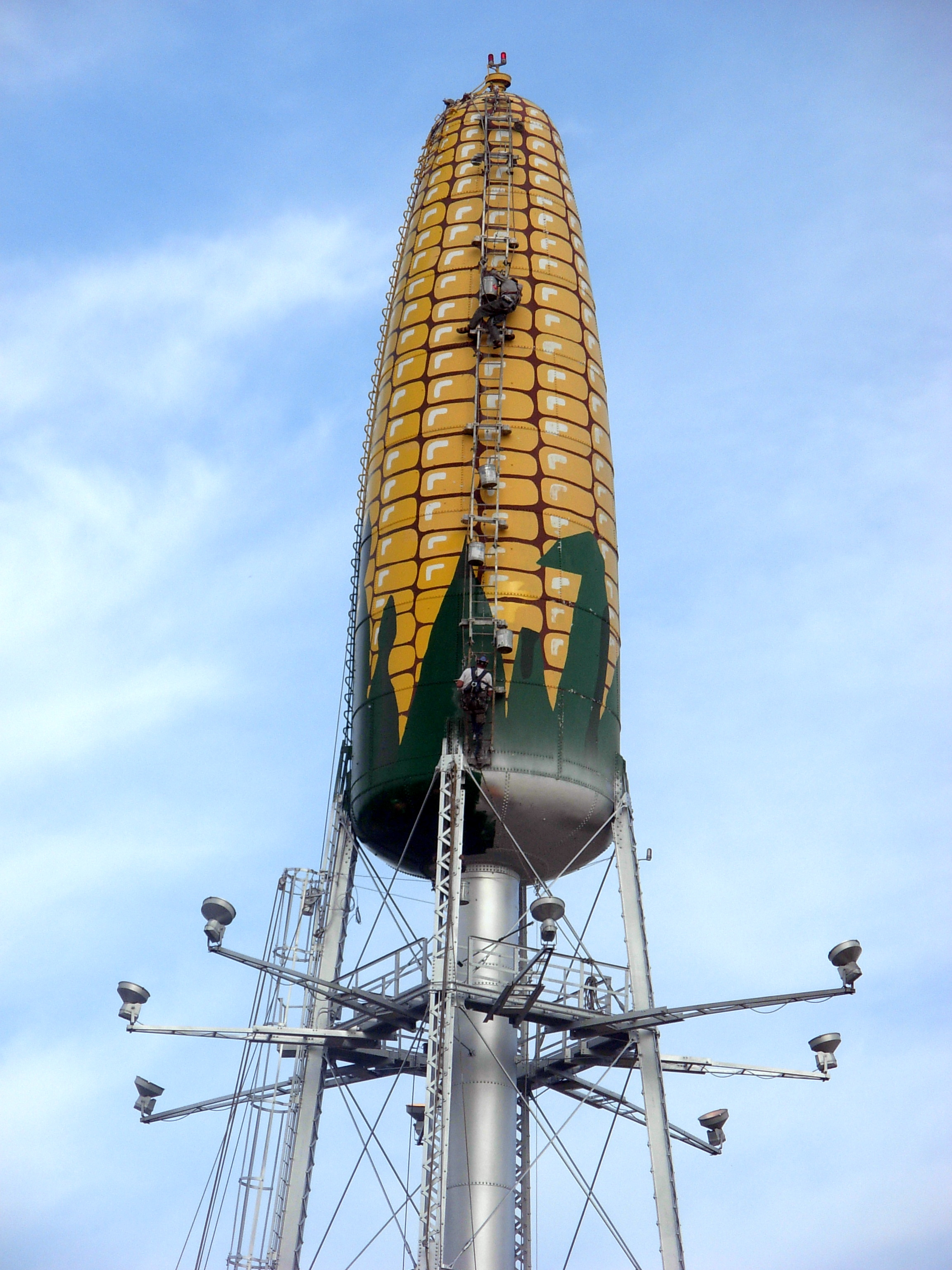
Water tower in Rochester, Minnesota being painted as an ear of maize, 2008

== See also ==
- Blue corn – Variety of maize
- Dent corn – Variety of corn
- Detasseling – Removing male flowers from corn plants
- Flint corn – Variety of maize
- Glass gem corn – Variety of maize
- Post-harvest losses (grains) – Ways in which grain losses can occur and ways of addressing problems
- Purple corn – Variety of flint maize
- Push–pull technology – Pest control strategy for maize and sorghum
- Zein – Proteins found in maize (corn)
