= World Agricultural Outlook Board =

The World Agricultural Outlook Board (WAOB), as part of the USDA's Office of the Chief Economist, coordinates the USDA's commodity forecasting program; monitors global weather and analyzes its impact on agriculture; and coordinates USDA's weather, climate and remote sensing work.
