= Blue corn =

Variety of maize

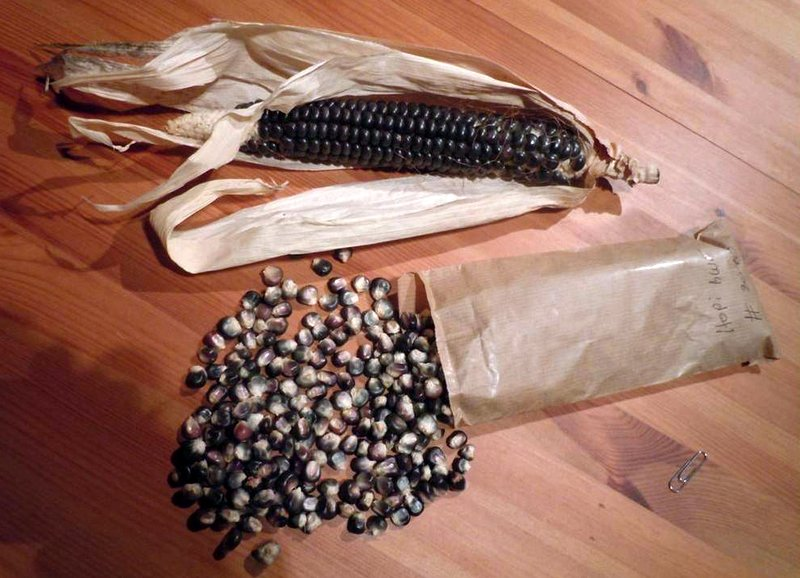
Hopi blue corn

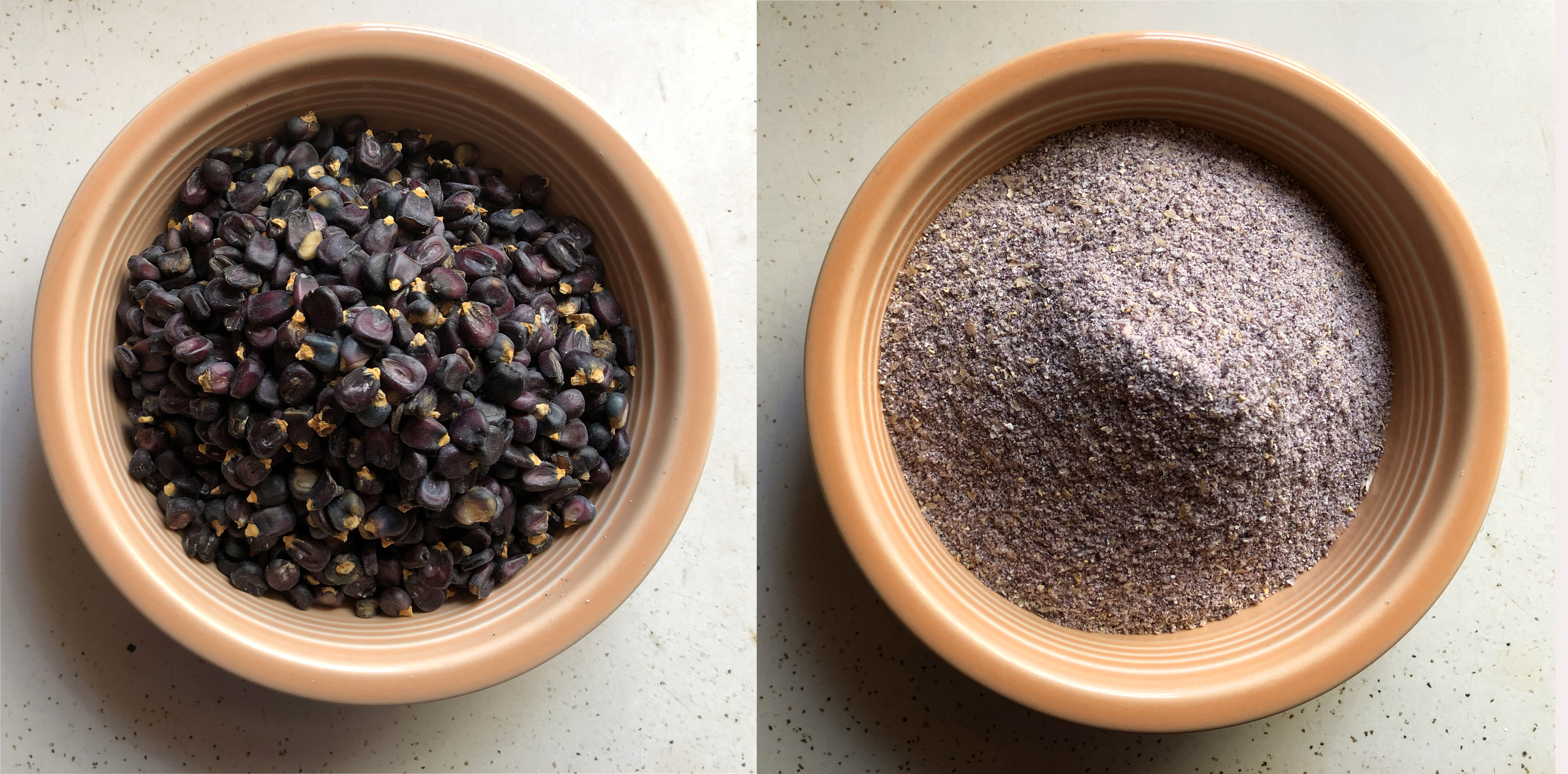
New Mexican blue corn for pozole (L) and roasted and ground (R)

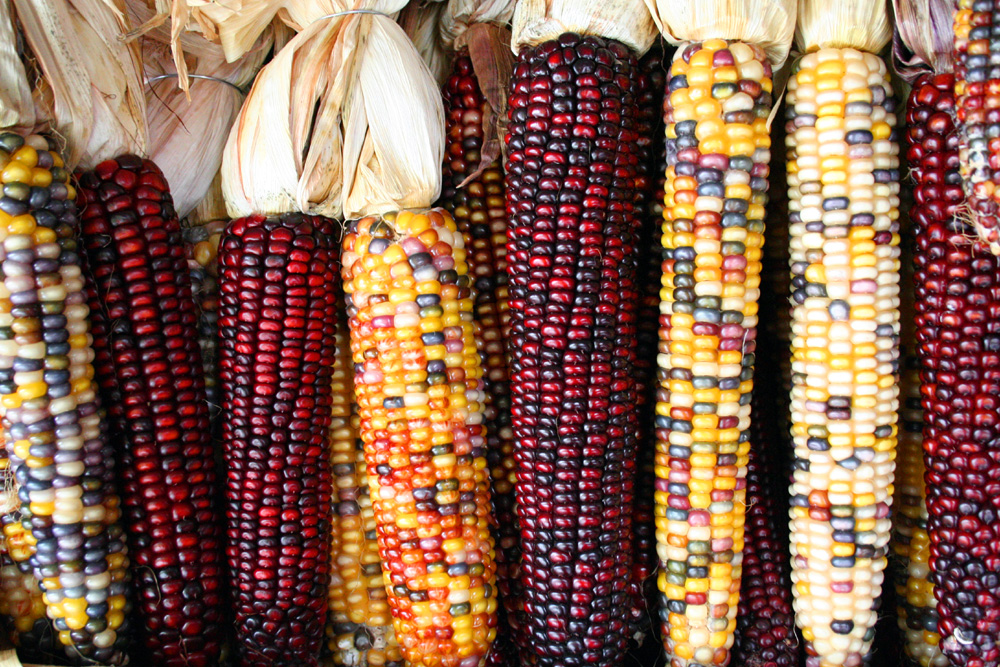
Ears of corn, including the dark blue corn variety

Blue corn (also known as Hopi maize, Yoeme Blue, Tarahumara Maiz Azul, and Rio Grande Blue) is a group of several closely related varieties of flint corn grown in Mexico, the Southwestern United States, and the Southeastern United States. It is one of the main types of corn used for the traditional Southern and Central Mexican food known as tlacoyo.

It was originally developed by the Hopi, the Pueblo peoples of the Rio Grande, and several Southeastern tribes, including the Cherokee. It remains an essential part of Hopi dishes like piki bread. Blue corn meal is a corn meal that is ground from whole blue corn and has a sweet flavor. It is also a staple of New Mexican cuisine used commonly to make tortillas.

Blue corn contains anthocyanins, which give the corn its blue color.

== Varieties ==
Five Hopi blue corn cultivars identified in the 1950s showed significant differences for several traits, such as plant height, kernel weight, width of kernel, and thickness of kernel. The different varieties have a color range from nearly black to blue-grey, with names derived from the "standard" blue (sakwaqa'o), hard blue (huruskwapu), and grey-blue (maasiqa'o).

The traditional Hopi blue corn varieties are extremely drought-tolerant, deep-rooted, and somewhat short plants, seldom exceeding 1.2–1.5 m (4–5 ft) in height. The Rio Grande pueblo blue corn varieties are taller, reaching 1.5–2.1 m (5–7 ft), higher yielding, and not as drought-tolerant as the Hopi varieties. Both varieties of blue corn prefer deep, sandy soils.

Other native varieties of blue corn include Yoeme Blue, a small kernel, short (0.9–1.2 m or 3–4 ft), bushy, and heat-tolerant low desert blue corn variety cultivated on the Salt River Pima Reservation in Arizona, and the Tarahumara northern Mexican variety Tarahumara Maiz Azul, cultivated in the high deserts bordering the Sierra Madre in Northern Mexico. Tarahumara Maiz Azul is widely used to make tortillas and tamales in Mexico, as well as tesgüino, a Tarahumaran corn beer.

A Cherokee heirloom variety of blue corn which originated from the Eastern Band of Cherokee Indians is called Cherokee White Eagle Corn and is distributed to Cherokee tribal members from the Cherokee Nation Seed Bank. It is a tall variety, reaching 1.5–2.1 m (5–7 ft), and is high yielding.

== Tortilla protein content ==
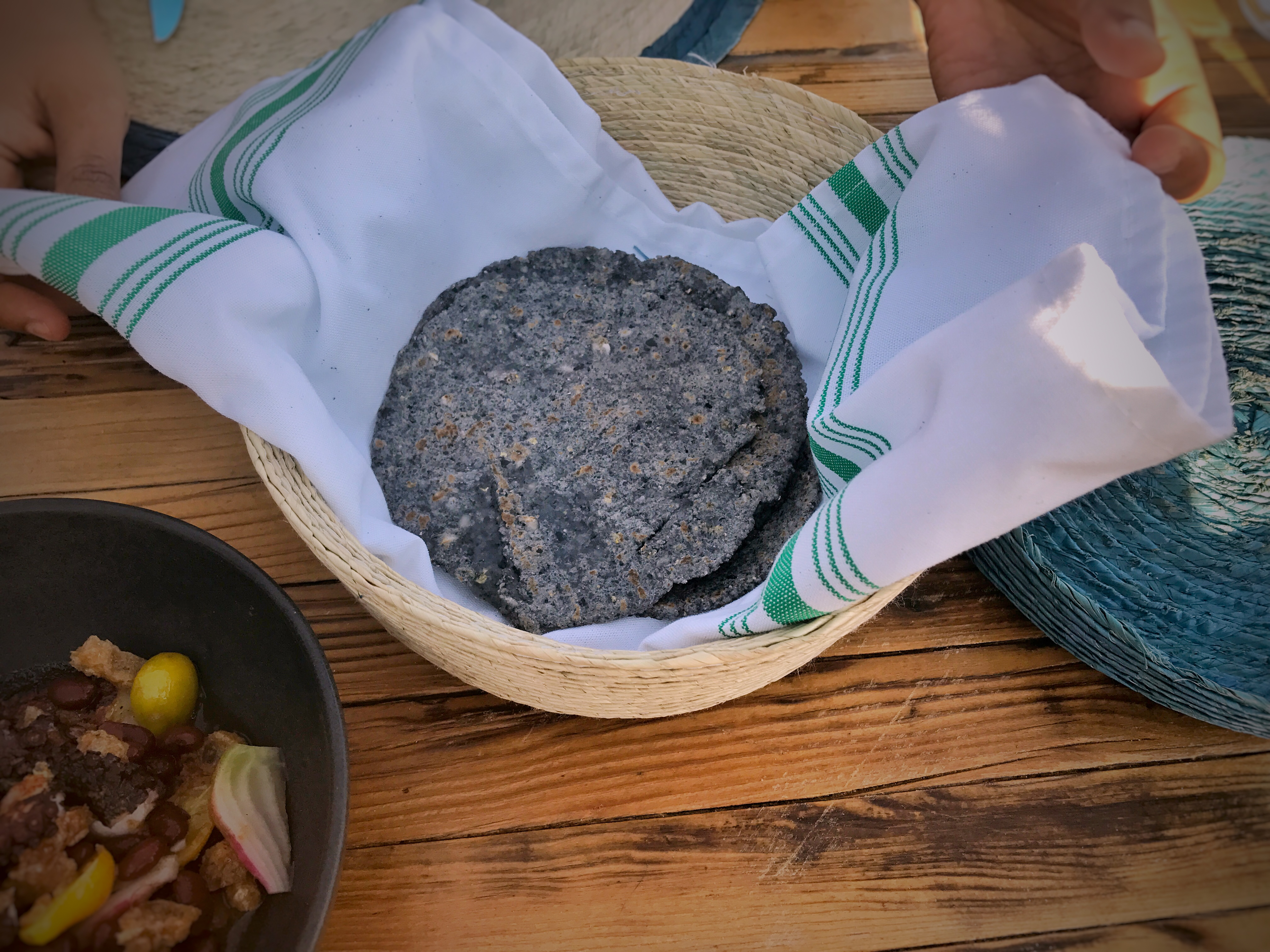
Handmade blue corn tortillas

In 100 grams of blue corn tortilla (Sakwavikaviki), the protein content is 7.8%, compared to 5.7% in yellow corn tortillas.

== Anthocyanins ==
Varieties of blue corn cultivated in the Southwestern United States vary in their respective contents of anthocyanins, the polyphenol pigment giving the corn its unique color. Anthocyanins having the highest contents are cyanidin 3-glucoside (most abundant), pelargonidin and peonidin 3-glucoside.

== Uses ==
=== Food ===
Aside from its use in traditional Southwestern dishes of tortillas and cereal, blue corn is used commercially in products such as blue corn chips and blue corn pancake mix.

=== Symbolic ===
The Hopi use corn in religious rituals, placing it in a framework of directional associations in which yellow corn is associated with the Northwest, blue corn with the Southwest, red corn with the Southeast, white corn with the Northeast, black corn with the Above, and all-colored corn with the Below.

== Gallery ==
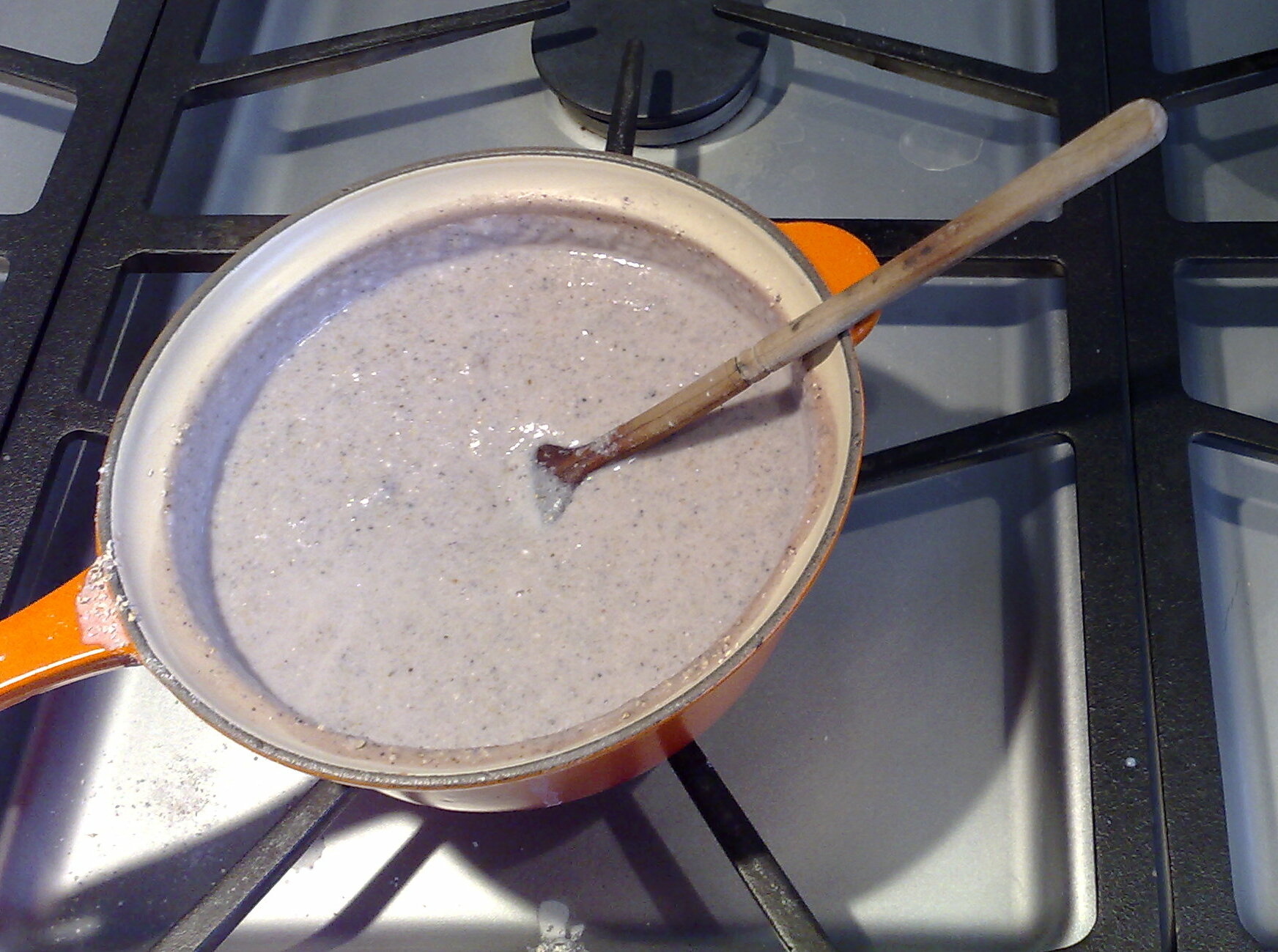
Blue corn atole porridge

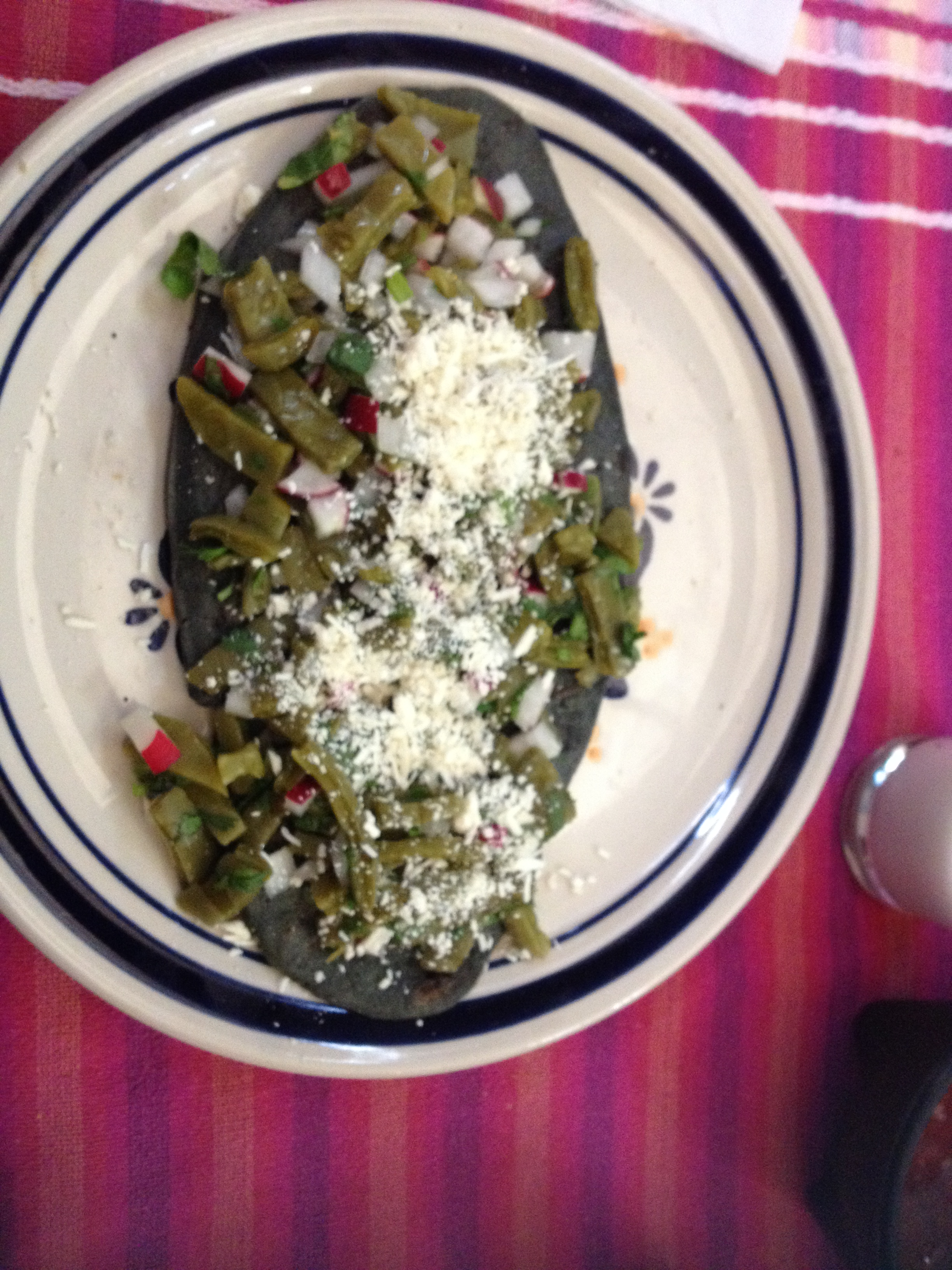
Tlacoyo, Mexican appetizer made of blue corn

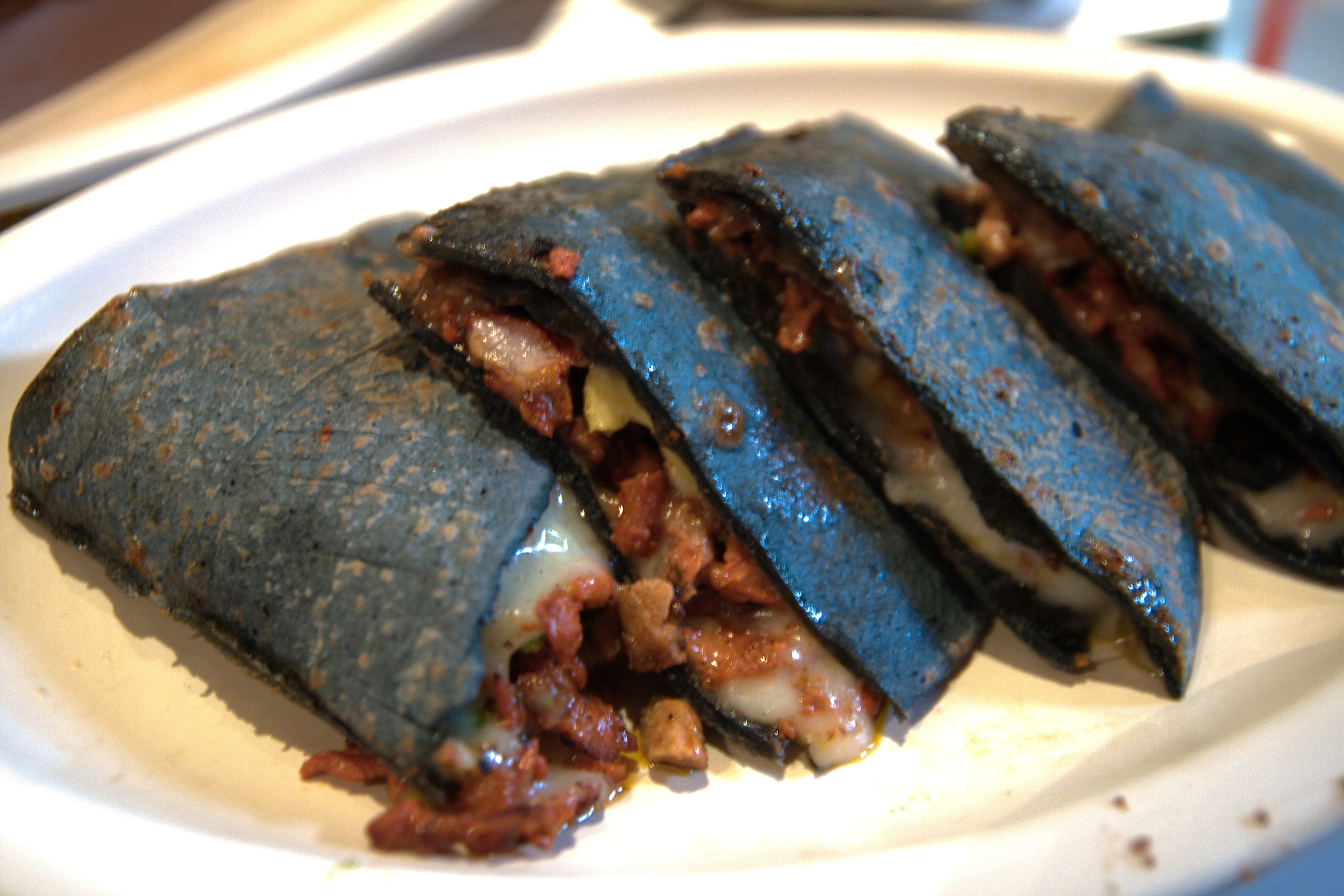
Blue corn quesadillas

== See also ==
- Flint corn
- Glass gem corn
- List of maize dishes
- Maize
- Purple corn
