= Prehistoric agriculture in the Southwestern United States =

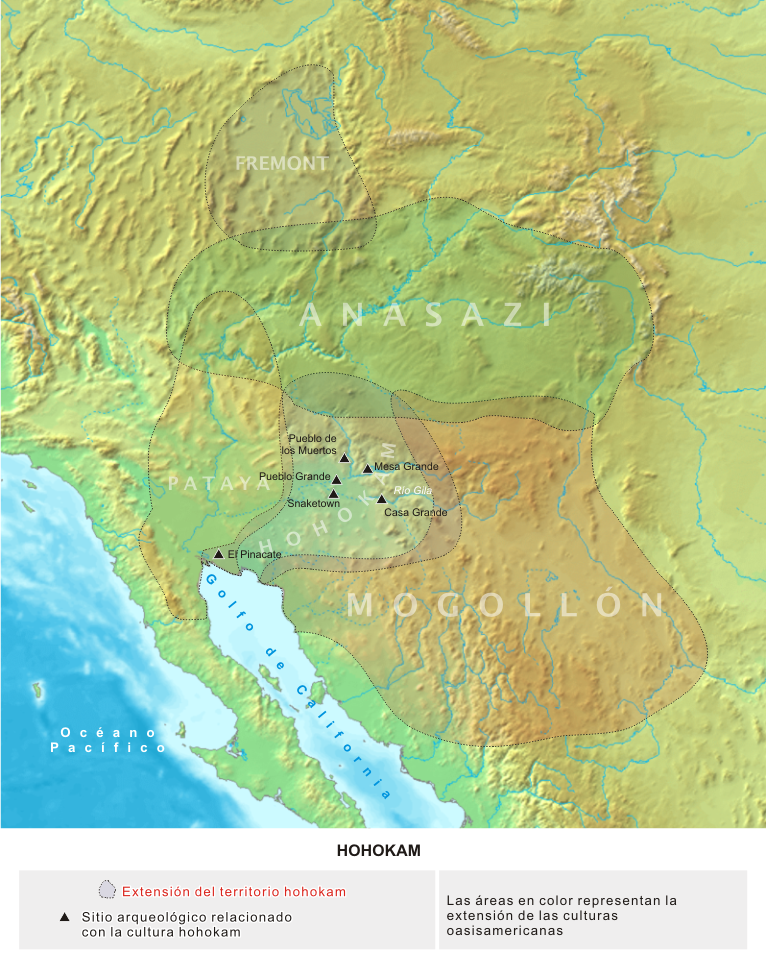
A map of the pre-historic cultures of the American Southwest ca 1200 CE. Several Hohokam settlements are shown

The agricultural practices of the Native Americans inhabiting the American Southwest, which includes the states of Arizona and New Mexico plus portions of surrounding states and neighboring Mexico, are influenced by the low levels of precipitation in the region. Irrigation and several techniques of water harvesting and conservation were essential for successful agriculture. To take advantage of limited water, the southwestern Native Americans utilized irrigation canals, terraces (trincheras), rock mulches, and floodplain cultivation. Success in agriculture enabled some Native Americans to live in communities that numbered in the thousands as compared to their former lives as hunter-gatherers in which their bands numbered only a few dozen.

Maize (corn), the dominant crop, was introduced from Mesoamerica and cultivated in the present-day Southwest U.S. by 2100 BCE at the latest. Non-migrant cultures based on farming developed afterwards, including the Hohokam, Mogollon, Ancestral Puebloans, and Patayan.

The environmental challenges of agriculture in the Southwest resulted in the demise or evolution of many once-successful agricultural societies, but they left behind impressive archeological evidence of their existence. Some agricultural cultures, such as the Pueblos of the United States and the Yaqui and Mayo of Mexico, were durable and survive into the 21st century.

== Earliest agriculture ==
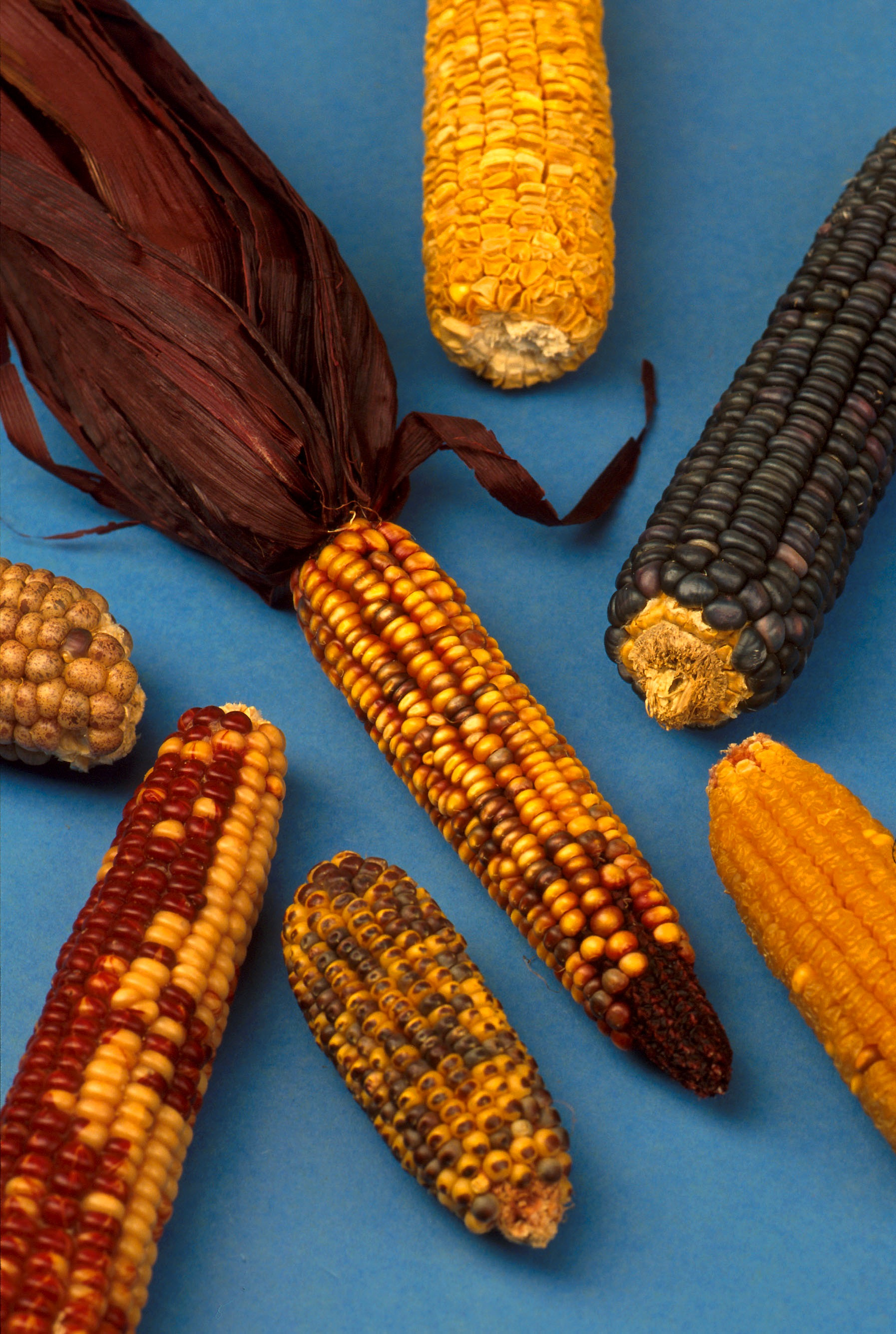
Varieties of maize

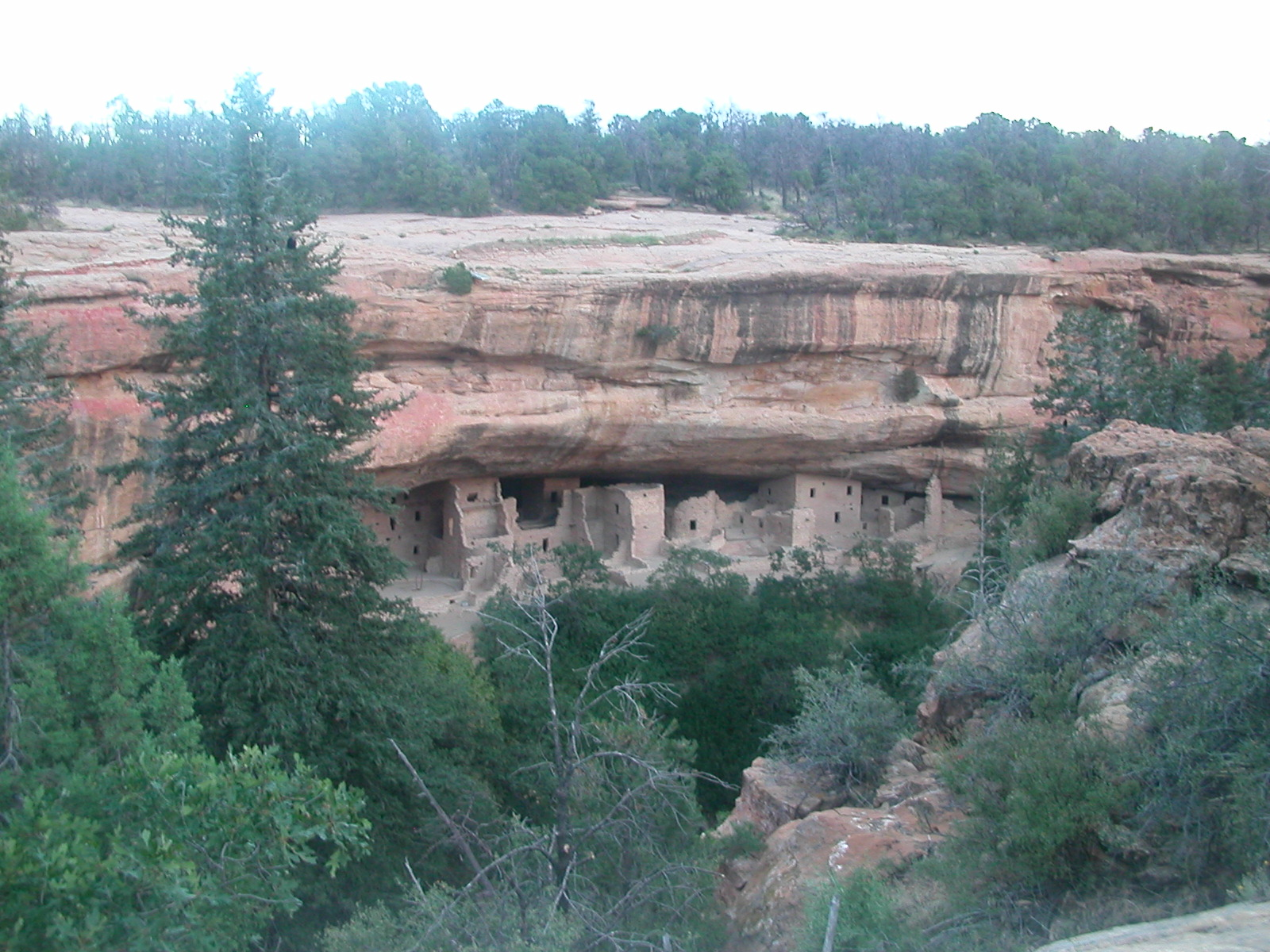
At Mesa Verde, the people lived below and farmed on top of the mesa, contending with both short growing seasons and frequent drought.

Indigenous people in the Southwest likely began domesticating local plants, such as native grasses and weedy annuals, over 5000 years ago. Later, Mesoamerican crops like squash and maize were introduced to the region between 3000 and 2000 BP. Other introduced crops, including amaranth, the common bean, and cotton, appeared between 800 BC and AD 300. As the lower America crops were introduced, the people developed agricultural practices to incorporate them into their economies, taking into account the climate and conditions of their land.

Geographer William E. Doolittle describes the diverse geography of the Southwest by categorizing its agricultural landscape into two types: "the floodplains of low-lying desert streams, with deep and fertile soils that are highly localized" and "upland slopes where rainfall may be sufficient but soils are thin and of poor quality". Despite the limitations of the land, Doolittle observed that agriculture was quite intensive for many early farmers, who modified the landscape with durable irrigation systems and check dams to support the growth of various cultivars. The prehistoric people of the Southwest developed various agricultural techniques and technologies to manage water retention for crop growth, including diverse field designs like runoff agroecosystems and terraces, lithic-mulch soils, and waffle gardens.

Among the crops introduced to the Southwest, maize emerged as the most important and widely grown. The earliest evidence of maize cultivation in the Southwest dates from about 2100 BCE. Small, primitive maize cobs have been found at five different sites in New Mexico and Arizona. These sites encompass a wide climatic range, from the Tucson basin in the Arizona desert, at an elevation of 700 m (2300 ft), to a rocky cave on the Colorado Plateau at 2200 m (7200 ft). This variation suggests that the primitive maize grown in these areas was already adapted for growth in both hot, dry climates and short growing seasons.

Maize reached the Southwest via an unknown route from Mexico. Its diffusion was relatively rapid. One theory is that the maize cultivation was carried northward from central Mexico by migrating farmers, most likely speakers of a Uto-Aztecan language. Another theory, more accepted among scholars, is that maize was diffused northward from group to group rather than migrants. The first cultivation of maize in the Southwest came during a climatic period when precipitation was relatively high. Although maize cultivation spread rapidly in the Southwest, the hunter-gatherers living in the region did not immediately adopt it as their primary source of nutrition, but rather integrated maize cultivation as one element, initially a minor element, in their foraging strategy. Hunter-gatherers usually exploit a broad spectrum of food sources to minimize risk in the event that one or more of their principal sources of food fails.

Pre-agricultural hunter-gatherer bands were typically small, comprising only 10–50 members, although several bands joined on occasion for ceremonies or mutual cooperation. As maize cultivation became more important, communities became larger and more settled, although hunting and gathering wild foods remained important. Several of the agricultural towns in the Southwest, such as Casa Grande and Casas Grandes plus Pueblo and Opata settlements may have had populations of 2,000 or more at the peak of their influence. Many more people lived in smaller satellite settlements of 200 to 300 people each, or in isolated settlements.

Maize cultivation in the Southwest predates by many centuries maize cultivation in the eastern United States which has a much more favorable climate for agriculture.

== Crops ==
Southwestern farmers probably began experimenting with agriculture by facilitating the growth of wild grains such as amaranth and chenopods and gourds for edible seeds and containers. The earliest maize known to have been grown in the Southwest was a popcorn variety with a cob only about one or two inches long. It was not a very productive crop. More productive varieties were developed by Southwestern farmers or introduced from Mesoamerica. Beans and squashes were also introduced from Mesoamerica, although the drought-resistant tepary bean was native. Cotton, presumably cultivated, is found at archaeological sites dating about 1200 BC in the Tucson basin and evidence of tobacco use, and possibly cultivation, occurs at about the same time. Agave, especially Agave murpheyi, was a major food source of the Hohokam and was grown on dry hillsides where other crops would not grow. The early farmers also consumed and possibly facilitated the growth of cactus fruit, mesquite bean, and species of wild grasses for their edible seeds.

== Tools ==
Southwestern Indians did not have draft animals or metal tools. Planting was done with a sharpened, fire-hardened stick, a tool that is now known as a dibble stick. Hoes and shovels were made of wood and the shoulder bones of buffalo and other large animals. Mussel shells, pottery, and rocks were also used as planting and digging tools. Indians did not customarily fertilize their field with organic matter, but rather relied on crop rotation, fallowing, and silt deposit from rainwater runoff. Fire was sometimes used to clear and fertilize land with ash. They transported water in large pottery jugs for hand watering of garden plots.

== Water management ==
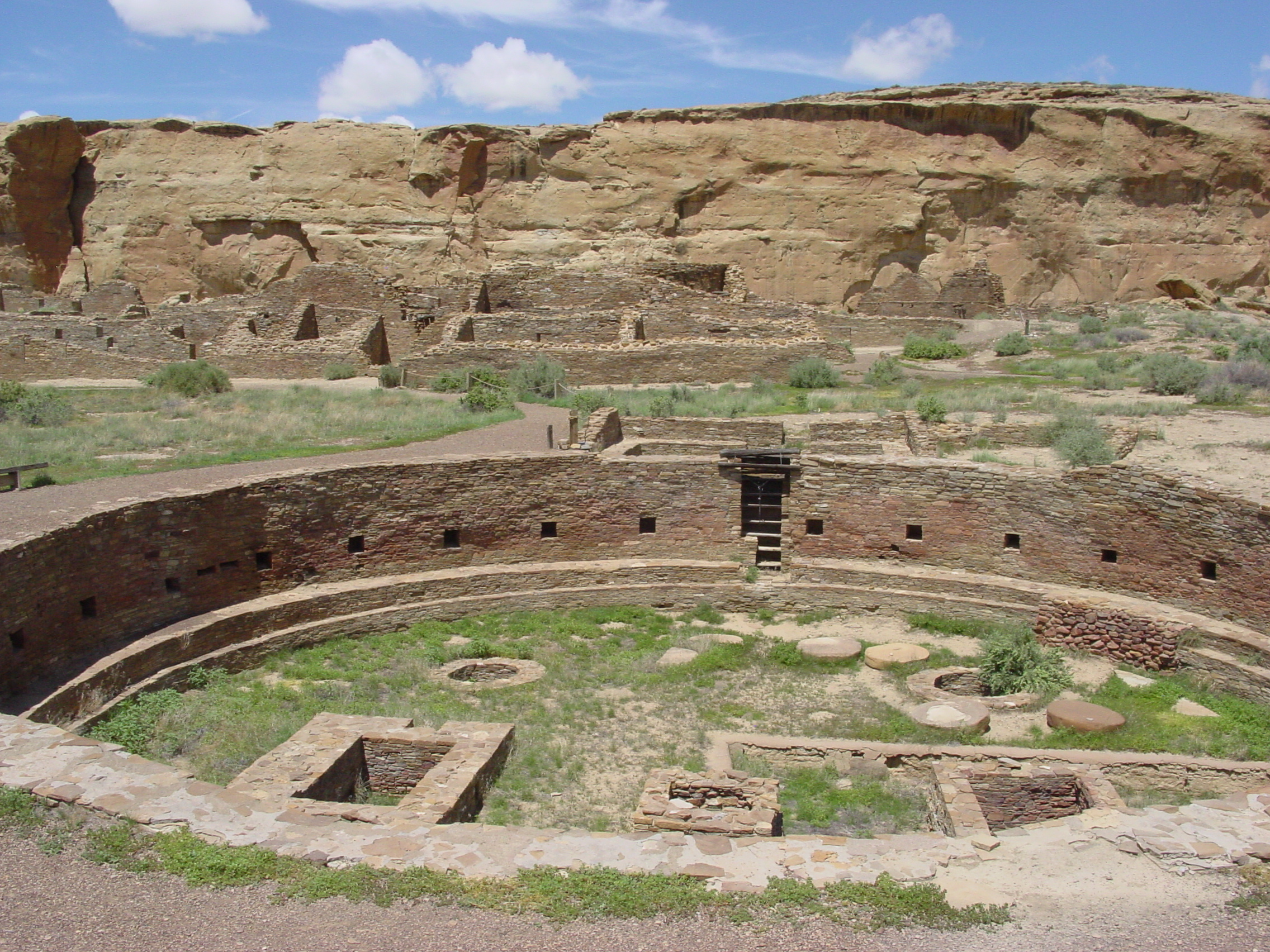
At Chaco Canyon, the Ancestral Puebloans captured rainwater runoff from the mesas and directed it to their small fields, thus enabling them to create a complex society in an austere high-altitude desert

Agriculture at the lower elevations of the Southwest is difficult without irrigation as precipitation is sparse and unreliable. Higher elevations, about 5,000 feet (1,500 m), may have greater precipitation but also have cooler temperatures, shorter growing seasons, and less fertile soils. In either case agriculture was a challenge. The agricultural strategies used by ancient Southwestern farmers included: "seed selection, fallowing fields, planting in different locations, staggering the times of plantings, and maintaining separate plantings of different corn and bean varieties."

=== Canal irrigation ===
The Las Capas site near Tucson features the earliest irrigation system, dating to 1200 BCE, found in the United States. The network of canals and small fields, each about 250 ft^{2} (23 m^{2}) in size, covers more than 100 acres (40 hectares) indicating a sizable community of people with the organization to undertake substantial public works project. Also found at the site are tobacco pipes, the oldest smoking pipes yet found. This site may have supported 150 people. Corn grown at Las Capas was similar to today's popcorn. Archaeologists speculate that the kernels were popped and then ground into meal to make tortillas.

The Las Capas people were probably the forerunners of the Hohokam, the most accomplished farmers of the Southwest. The Hohokam lived in the Gila and Salt river valleys of Arizona between the first century and 1450 CE. Their society bloomed about 750 CE, probably as a result of their agricultural success. The Hohokam constructed a vast system of canals to irrigate thousands of acres of cropland. Their main canals were as much as 10 m (10 yards) wide, four m (4 yards) deep, and extended across the river valleys for as much as 30 km (19 mi). At the peak of their culture in the 14th century, the Hohokam may have numbered 40,000 people.

The sudden disappearance of the Hohokam between 1400 and 1450 CE is a puzzle. Archaeologists speculate that maintenance of the canals was difficult and sediment accumulated over the centuries. Farmers were forced to abandon old canals and move further from the river, increasing the technological challenge to farming. After a thousand years of success, the Hohokam were unable to sustain their intensive agricultural economy. They disappeared from the archaeological record and when Spanish explorers reached the Gila and Salt valleys in the 16th century, they were only sparsely populated by the Upper Pima and Tohono O'odham (Papago) Indians, the likely descendants of the Hohokam.

After the Hohokam disappeared, Spanish explorers of the 16th century noted the use of canal irrigation in only two areas of the Southwest: eastern Sonora, primarily practiced by the Opata and Lower Pima, and among the Pueblos of northern New Mexico. Irrigation by the Opata and Pueblos had different objectives. In Sonora, with a long growing season, two crops of maize a year were grown in river valleys. The spring crop during the dry season was dependent upon irrigation; the summer and fall crop during the rainy season utilized irrigation to supplement rainfall. The necessity of irrigation probably required a high level of social organization. In New Mexico, with only one crop of maize per year possible, irrigation was supplemental and the lesser dependence on irrigation implies less social organization than in Sonora.

=== Trincheras ===
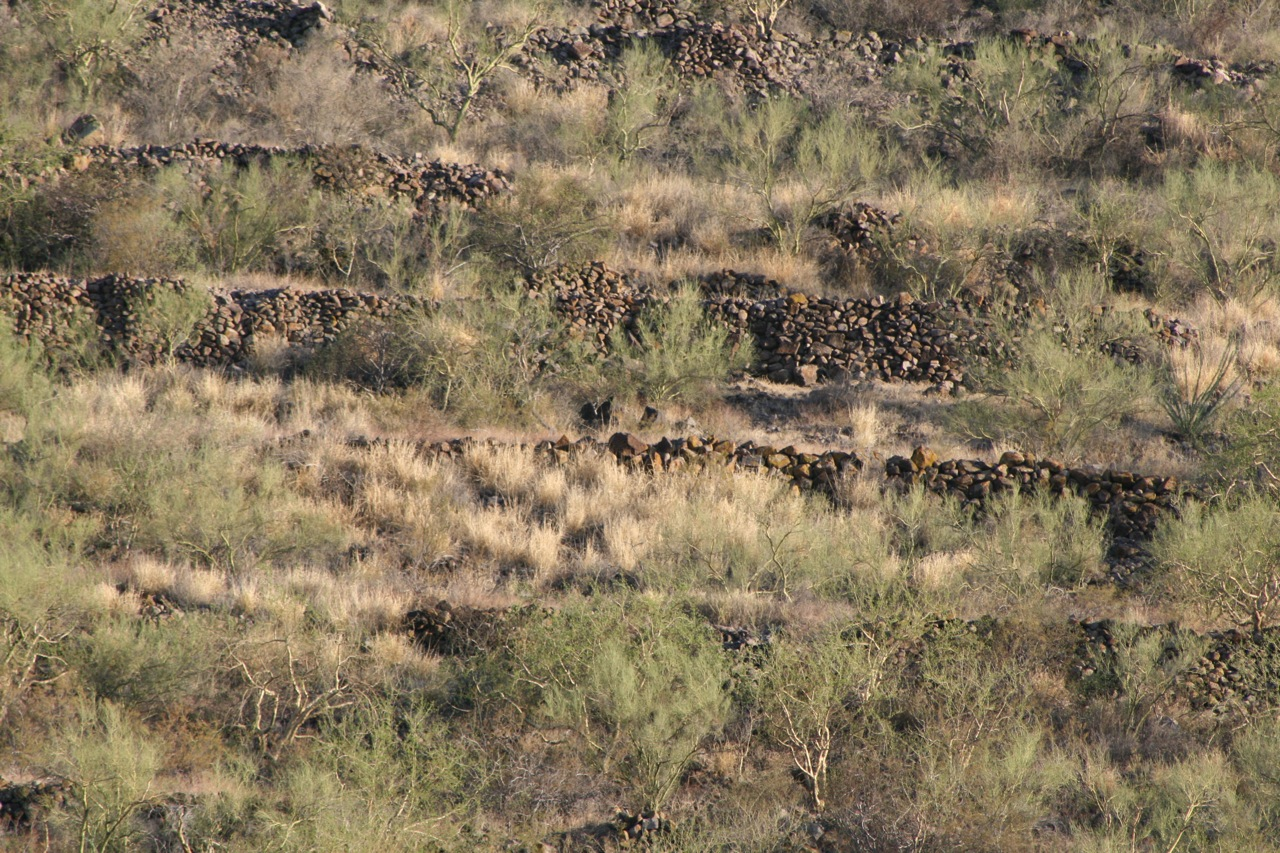
The rock walls called trincheras are visible in this photo taken at the Cerro de Trincheras near Trincheras, Sonora. Agriculture at this site dates from 1300 to 1500 CE

Trincheras (Spanish for trenches or fortifications) are rock walls or terraces built on hillsides by pre-historic Indians. Trincheras are common throughout the Southwest. They date back to near the beginning of Southwestern agriculture. By about 1300 BCE, at Casas Grandes, in Chihuahua, early farmers constructed hilltop fortresses and trincheras on hillsides, public works that required considerable labor and organization which implies a settled and numerous community.

Trincheras served a number of purposes such as defense, homesites, and agriculture. Their agricultural purposes were to provide farmers a level planting surface and aid in preventing erosion, collecting and managing water, and preventing frost damage. Hillside agriculture in the small fields created by trincheras was often of secondary importance to floodplain farming. Trinchera agriculture was probably used to grow all crops. Southwestern Indian farmers often cultivated several different fields and crops in different locations and environments to reduce the risk of crop failure. Should one or more plantings fail for whatever reason, other plantings might succeed.

Four types of trincheras were constructed. Check dams were constructed across drainages to capture runoff from precipitation; terraces and linear borders were built along contours to provide a level planting surface or homesite; and, near permanent streams and rivers, riverside terraces were constructed to capture the overflow of water from floods. Trincheras were extensive. For example, archaeologists have found 183 upland farming locations near the site of Casas Grandes with trincheras that have a cumulative length of 26,919 m, almost 18 miles. This extensive use and importance of trincheras at Casas Grandes was replicated in many other agricultural societies in the Southwest.

=== Lithic mulch ===
Lithic mulch was another technique of agriculture in the Southwest. Rocks or cobbles were used as a mulch around growing plants and in fields. The rocks acted as a mulch to preserve moisture, decrease soil erosion, control weeds, and increase nighttime temperatures through radiation and retention of heat by the rocks. In the 1980s, archaeologists discovered that large areas of agave, especially Agave murpheyi, had been cultivated in rock mounds by the Hohokam in the Tucson Basin, near the city of Marana. Seventy-eight square kilometers (almost 20,000 acres) of former agave fields have since been discovered, mostly between Phoenix and Tucson. Undoubtedly many other fields have been destroyed or are undetected by archaeologists. Northern New Mexico also has the remnants of many fields mulched with rocks. Maize and cotton pollen have been found in soil associated with the rock mounds and mulch.

=== Floodplain cultivation ===
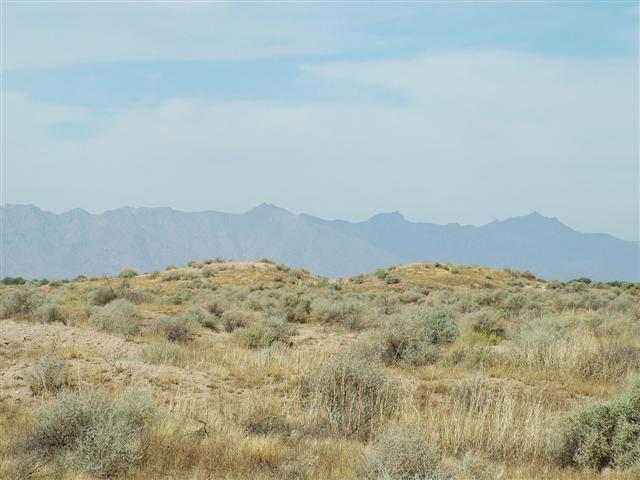
Snaketown: in 1000 CE, this was a flourishing Hohokam settlement of more than 1,000 people with canals bringing water from the nearby Gila River

In their effort to attain food security, Southwestern Indians cultivated the floodplains of rivers and ephemeral streams. Crops were planted on floodplains and islands to take advantage of high water when the river or stream overflowed, saturated the land with water and enriched the soil with silt. This method was most effective when floods came at predictable times. Floodplain cultivation was used instead of canal irrigation by the La Junta Indians (often called Jumano) along the Rio Grande in western Texas and was also employed by other peoples.

The semi-nomadic Tohono O'odham and other Indians of the Sonora Desert practiced ak-chin cultivation of the indigenous tepary bean (Phaseolus acutifolius). In this austere desert environment, after summer monsoon rains, the Papago would rush to plant tepary beans in small areas where a stream or arroyo had overflowed and the soil was soaked. The tepary bean quickly germinated and matured before the soil dried out. The Indians often managed the flow of floodwater to facilitate the growth of the beans.

Floodplain cultivation was possible under the most extreme conditions. The Sand Papago (Hia C-eḍ O'odham) were mainly hunter-gatherers but practiced floodplain cultivation when it was possible for them to do so. In 1912, ethnographer Carl Lumholtz found small cultivated fields primarily of Tepary beans in the Pinacate Peaks area of Sonora. In the Pinacate, with an average annual precipitation of three inches (75mm) and temperatures up to 118F (48C), Papago and Mexican farmers utilized runoff from sparse rains to grow crops. In the 1980s author Gary Paul Nabhan visited this area, and found one farm family taking advantage of the first large rain in six years, planting seeds in the wet ground and harvesting a crop two months later. The most successful crops were Tepary beans and a drought-adapted squash. Nabhan calculated that the Pinacate is the most arid area in the world where rain-fed agriculture is practiced.

=== Waffle gardens ===
While an approximate timeframe of their development in prehistory is unclear, ancestral Navajo and Pueblo farmers, notably the Zuni, created a water conservation farming technique known as waffle gardening. Waffle gardens are a type of dry farming that takes advantage of a sufficiently high water table, thus eliminating the need for supplemental irrigation. These gardens are small, family plots with a checkerboard design of square sections with raised borders which gave them the appearance of a large waffle. The beds were generally six or more squares long and two squares wide. Each square in the checkerboard was bordered with thick walls approximately 10 centimetres (3.9 in) high and 10 cm wide, and cultigens like maize, beans, squash, cotton, and pumpkins were grown in them, as well as non-domesticated plants like coriander, ground cherry, amaranth, and edible greens.

The garden beds were placed adjacent to one another, with narrow pathways between them that were used for easy access in hand watering and weeding. In addition to retaining irrigation water, building thick ridge borders likely helped prevent wind and water erosion, minimize evaporation, and regulate temperature. Women tended to the waffle gardens hand-watering plants in the grids. They would carry water from a source, such as a well or river, in earthen jars balanced on their heads.

== Success and failure ==
The Southwest is littered with the archaeological remains of efforts by Indian societies to overcome the severe environmental challenges to agriculture throughout the region. The Ancestral Puebloan centers of Chaco Canyon and Mesa Verde were abandoned in the 12th and 13th centuries CE, probably because of drought. After a thousand years of success, the complex Hohokam society disappeared in the 15th century CE and became the smaller-scale Pima culture of historic times.

Despite these challenges, many Indian agricultural societies have proven to be resilient. The Rio Grande Pueblos, the Hopi, and the Zuni have survived to the present day while retaining much of their traditional culture. For instance, traditional waffle gardens are making a comeback as a solution for drought-affected crops, with an estimated twenty percent of Zuni homes having these gardens in 2024. Many Indigenous people of Mexico connected to the Southwest have been integrated into a mestizo society, but the Yaqui and Mayo still retain their identities and part of their traditional lands. In contrast, the once numerous Opata have disappeared as a distinct people, but their descendants still occupy the valleys of the Sonora River and its tributaries.

== See also ==
- Dryland farming
