= Cyanidin-3-O-glucoside 2-O-glucuronosyltransferase =

Class of enzymes

Identifiers
- EC no.: 2.4.1.254

Databases
- IntEnz: IntEnz view
- BRENDA: BRENDA entry
- ExPASy: NiceZyme view
- KEGG: KEGG entry
- MetaCyc: metabolic pathway
- PRIAM: profile
- PDB structures: RCSB PDB PDBe PDBsum
Search
- PMC: articles
- PubMed: articles
- NCBI: proteins

Cyanidin-3-O-glucoside 2-O-glucuronosyltransferase (EC 2.4.1.254, BpUGT94B1, UDP-glucuronic acid:anthocyanin glucuronosyltransferase, UDP-glucuronic acid:anthocyanidin 3-glucoside 2'-O-beta-glucuronosyltransferase, BpUGAT, UDP-D-glucuronate:cyanidin-3-O-beta-glucoside 2-O-beta-glucuronosyltransferase) is an enzyme with systematic name UDP-D-glucuronate:cyanidin-3-O-beta-D-glucoside 2-O-beta-D-glucuronosyltransferase. This enzyme catalyses the following chemical reaction

UDP-D-glucuronate + cyanidin 3-O-beta-D-glucoside $\rightleftharpoons$ UDP + cyanidin 3-O-(2-O-beta-D-glucuronosyl)-beta-D-glucoside

The enzyme is highly specific for cyanidin 3-O-glucosides and UDP-D-glucuronate.
