= Native Seeds/SEARCH =

- Native Seeds/Southwestern Endangered Aridland Resource Clearinghouse Inc
- Abbreviation: NS/S
- Formation: 1983; 43 years ago
- Type: Nonprofit
- Tax ID no.: 94-2899356
- Legal status: 501(c)(3)
- Headquarters: Tucson, Arizona
- Board Chair: Jacob Butler
- Executive Director: Alexandra Zamecnik
- Website: nativeseeds.org

Native Seeds/SEARCH, founded in 1983, is an American nonprofit conservation organization located in Tucson, Arizona.

In the words of its mission statement, its aims are "to conserve, distribute and document the adapted and diverse varieties of agricultural seed, their wild relatives and the role these seeds play in cultures of the American Southwest and northwest Mexico."

It supports traditional, native farmers and gardeners for the well-being of the food supply and community health. Specifically, the organization maintains a seed bank and a Conservation Farm in Tucson, Arizona, and distributes seeds, native food products, and indigenous arts through their online store. The organization also provides free or reduced-cost seeds to Native Americans.

SEARCH is an acronym that stands for Southwestern Endangered Aridland Resource Clearing House.

== History ==
Native Seeds/SEARCH was founded in 1983 by Gary Paul Nabhan, Karen Reichhardt, Barney Burns, and Mahina Drees. The organization grew out of a Meals for Millions gardening project in cooperation with the Tohono O'odham Nation. Native Seeds/SEARCH was founded as a means of curating, collecting, and distributing seeds of traditionally grown crops of the Southwest.

In 1991, Nabhan was named a recipient of a MacArthur Foundation grant to pursue his studies of the agronomic characteristics and health value of desert food plants, including in relation to controlling diabetes among Indians and Hispanic Americans. In the early 2000s, Native Seeds/SEARCH was using Glass Gem Corn in seed-related educational programs. Images of this rainbow-colored corn went viral, and Glass Gem is now considered the poster child of heirloom seeds. Native Seeds/SEARCH continues to conserve this seed and makes it available for planting.

As of 2016, the Native Seeds/SEARCH seed bank contained seeds from over 1800 plant varieties. In addition to a seed bank, Native Seeds/SEARCH opened a conservation farm in 1997. Seeds are distributed by mail order and a retail store in Tucson. Since 2001, Native Seeds/SEARCH has operated Southwest Regis-Tree to conserve Native Southwestern perennial species.
