= Dryland farming =

Non-irrigated farming in areas with little rainfall during the growing season

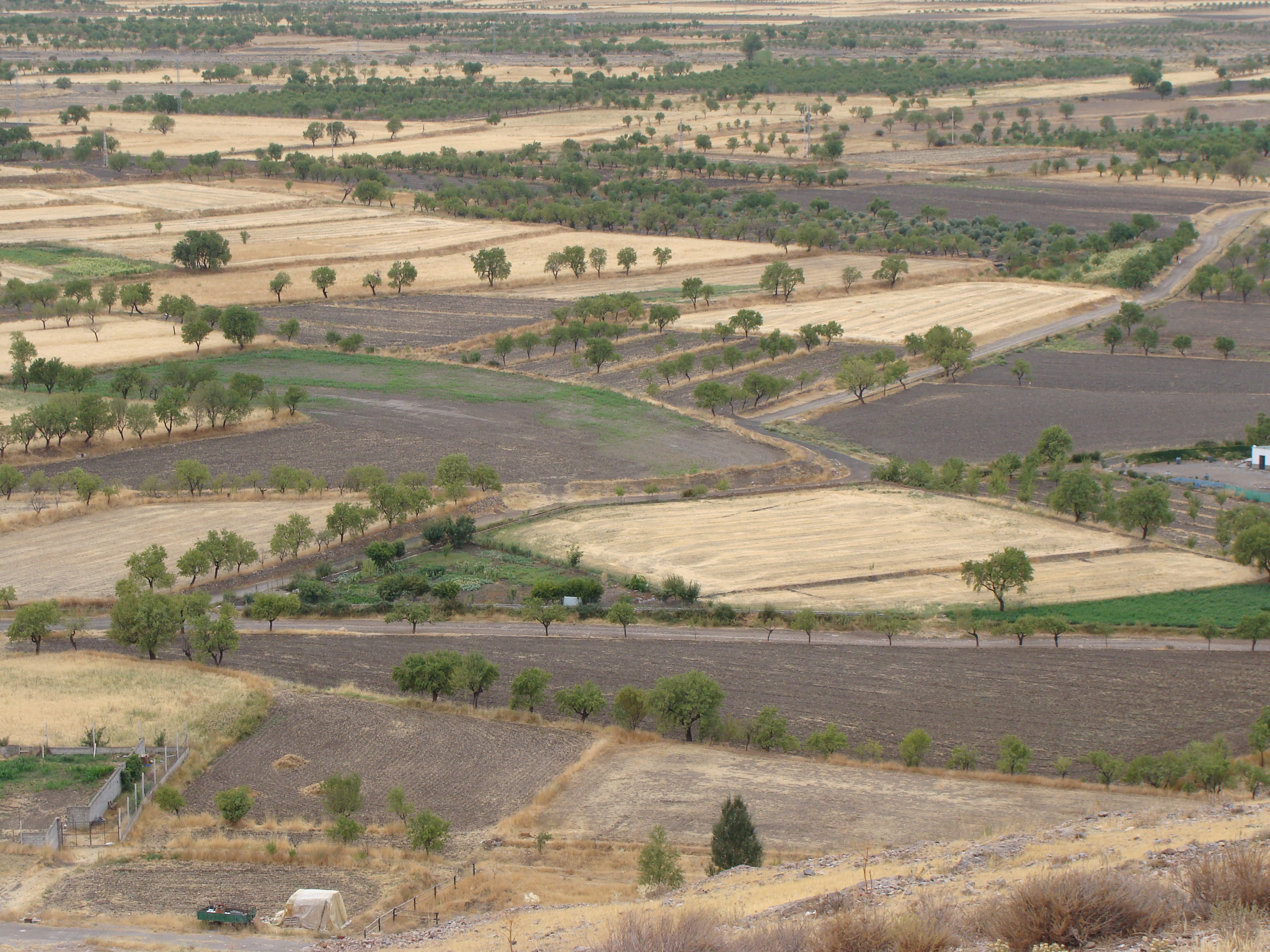
Dryland farming in the Granada region of Spain

Dryland farming and dry farming encompass agricultural techniques for growing crops without irrigation. Dryland farming is associated with drylands, areas characterized by a cool wet season (which charges the soil with virtually all the moisture that the crops will receive prior to harvest) followed by a warm dry season. They are also associated with arid conditions, areas prone to drought, and those having scarce water resources.

== Process ==
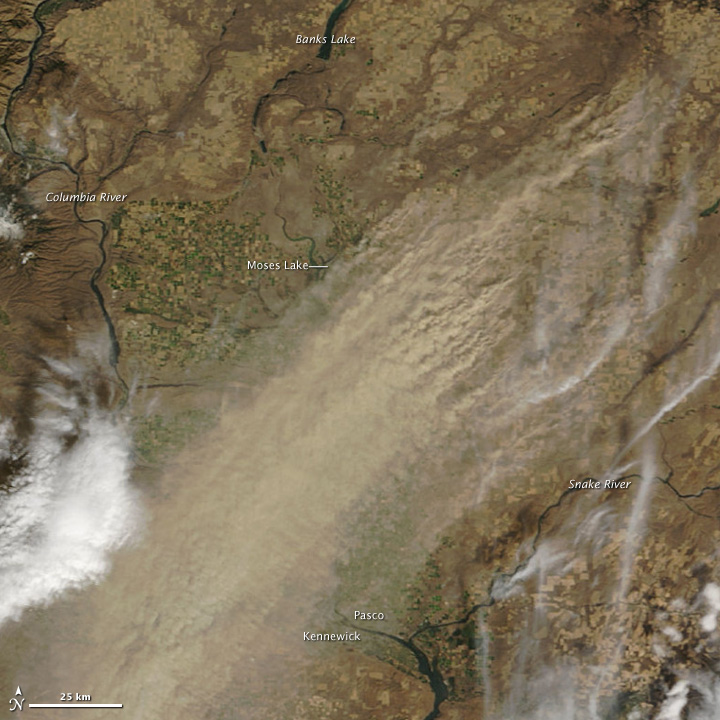
Dryland farming caused a large dust storm in parts of Eastern Washington on October 4, 2009. Courtesy: NASA/GSFC, MODIS Rapid Response.

Dryland farming has evolved as a set of techniques and management practices to adapt to limited availability of water, as in the Western US and other regions affected by climate change for crops such as tomato and maize.

In marginal regions, a farmer should be financially able to survive occasional crop failures, perhaps for several years in succession. Survival as a dryland farmer requires careful husbandry of the moisture available for the crop and aggressive management of expenses to minimize losses in poor years. Dryland farming involves the constant assessing of the amount of moisture present or lacking for any given crop cycle and planning accordingly. Dryland farmers know that to be financially successful they have to be aggressive during the good years in order to offset the dry years.

Dryland farming is dependent on natural rainfall, which can leave the ground vulnerable to dust storms, particularly if poor farming techniques are used or if the storms strike at a particularly vulnerable time. The fact that a fallow period must be included in the crop rotation means that fields cannot always be protected by a cover crop, which might otherwise offer protection against erosion.

Some of the theories of dryland farming developed in the late 19th and early 20th centuries claimed to be scientific but were in reality pseudoscientific and did not stand up to empirical testing. For example, it was alleged that tillage would seal in moisture, but such "dust mulching" ideas are based on what people imagine should happen, or have been told, rather than what testing actually confirms. In actuality, it has been shown that tillage increases water losses to evaporation. The book Bad Land: An American Romance explores the effects that this had on people who were encouraged to homestead in an area with little rainfall; most smallholdings failed after working miserably to cling on.

Dry farming depends on making the best use of the "bank" of soil moisture that was created by winter rainfall. Some dry farming practices include:

- Wider than normal spacing, to provide a larger bank of moisture for each plant.
- Controlled traffic.
- Minimal tilling of land.
- Strict weed control, to ensure that weeds do not consume soil moisture needed by the cultivated plants.
- Selection of crops and cultivars suited for dry farming practices.
- Cultivation of soil to produce a "dust mulch", thought to prevent the loss of water through capillary action. This practice is controversial, and is not universally advocated.

== Locations ==
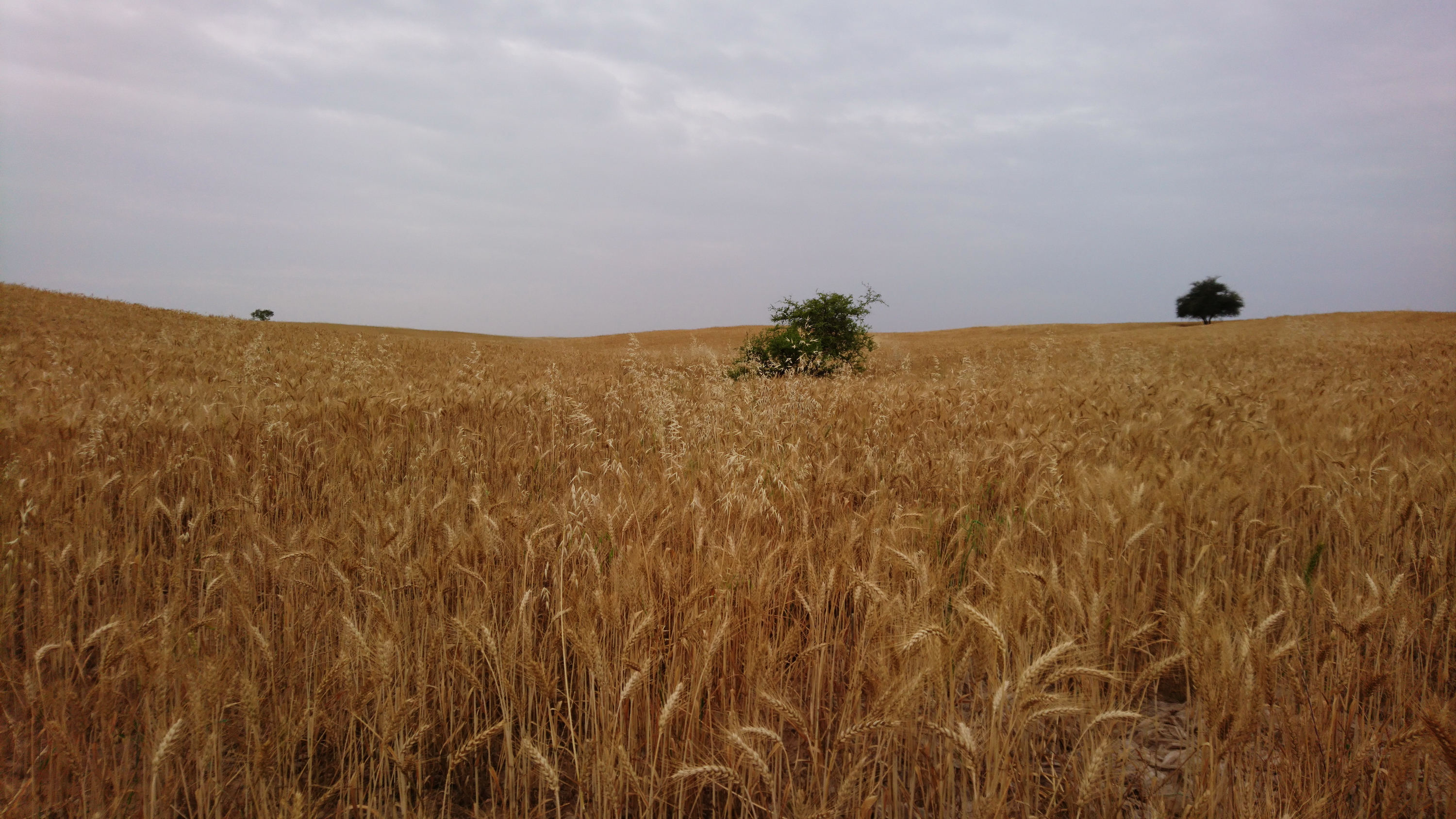
Wheat dryland farming in Behbahan, Iran

Dryland farming may be practised in areas that have significant annual rainfall during a wet season, often in the winter. Crops are cultivated during the subsequent dry season, using practices that make use of the stored moisture in the soil. This is the case in the Middle East and in other grain-growing regions such as the steppes of Eurasia and Argentina. Dryland farming was introduced to southern Russia and Ukraine by Ukrainian Mennonites under the influence of Johann Cornies, making the region the breadbasket of Europe. In Australia and Mexico, dryland farming is widely practised.

=== United States ===
Dryland farming is practised in arid regions such as in the Southwest of the United States (see Agriculture in the Southwestern United States and Agriculture in the prehistoric Southwest). California, Colorado, Kansas, South Dakota, North Dakota, Montana, Nebraska, Oklahoma, Oregon, Washington, Wyoming, the Great Plains, and the Palouse plateau of Eastern Washington.

== Crops ==
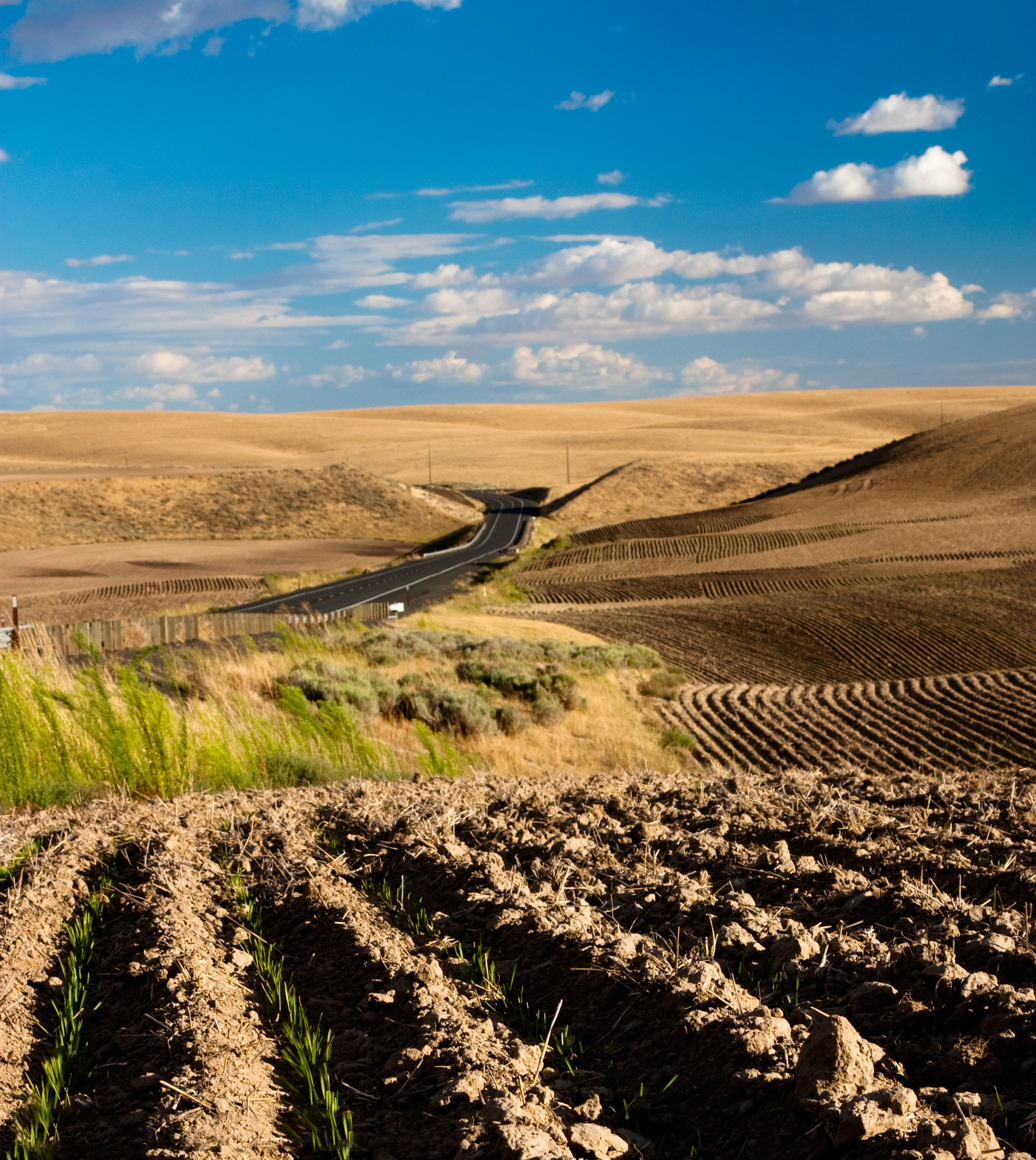
Fields in the Palouse, Washington State

The choice of crop is influenced by the timing of the predominant rainfall in relation to the seasons. For example, winter wheat is more suited to regions with higher winter rainfall while areas with summer wet seasons may be more suited to summer growing crops such as sorghum, sunflowers or cotton. Dry farmed crops may include grapes, tomatoes, pumpkins, beans, and other summer crops. In arid regions, CAM plants like agaves are also grown without irrigation.

Dryland grain crops include wheat, corn, millet, rye, and other grasses that produce grains. These crops grow using the winter water stored in the soil, rather than depending on rainfall during the growing season.

Successful dryland farming is possible with as little as 9 inches (230 millimetres) of precipitation a year; higher rainfall increases the variety of crops.

== Other considerations ==
=== Capturing and conservation of moisture ===
In regions such as Eastern Washington, the average annual precipitation available to a dryland farm may be as little as 220 millimetres (8.5 in). In the Horse Heaven Hills in central Washington, wheat farming has been productive purportedly on an average annual rainfall approaching 6 inches. Consequently, moisture must be captured until the crop can utilize it. Techniques include summer fallow rotation (in which one crop is grown on two seasons' precipitation, leaving standing stubble and crop residue to trap snow), and preventing runoff by terracing fields. "Terracing" is also practiced by farmers on a smaller scale by laying out the direction of furrows to slow water runoff downhill, usually by plowing along either contours or keylines. Moisture can be conserved by eliminating weeds and leaving crop residue to shade the soil.

=== Effective use of available moisture ===
Once moisture is available for the crop to use, it must be used as effectively as possible. Seed planting depth and timing are carefully considered to place the seed at a depth at which sufficient moisture exists, or where it will exist when seasonal precipitation falls. Farmers tend to use crop varieties which are drought-tolerant and heat-stress tolerant (even lower-yielding varieties). Thus the likelihood of a successful crop is hedged if seasonal precipitation fails.

=== Soil conservation ===
The nature of dryland farming makes it particularly susceptible to erosion, especially wind erosion. Some techniques for conserving soil moisture (such as frequent tillage to kill weeds) are at odds with techniques for conserving topsoil. Since healthy topsoil is critical to sustainable agriculture, in particular within arid areas, its preservation is generally considered the most important long-term goal of a dryland farming operation. Erosion control techniques such as windbreaks, reduced tillage or no-till, spreading straw (or other mulch on particularly susceptible ground), and strip farming are used to minimize topsoil loss.

=== Weedling ===
Weedling is process of turning over 90 degree and exposing weed's root during tillage to prevent soil erosion by wind and desertification. At the same time, Direct absorption of nutrients from weeds and moisture provides suitable environment to floris biodiversity of organisms in soil.

=== Control of input costs ===
Dryland farming is practiced in regions inherently marginal for non-irrigated agriculture. Because of this, there is an increased risk of crop failure and poor yields which may occur in a dry year (regardless of money or effort expended). Dryland farmers must evaluate the potential yield of a crop constantly throughout the growing season and be prepared to decrease inputs to the crop such as fertilizer and weed control if it appears that it is likely to have a poor yield due to insufficient moisture. Conversely, in years when moisture is abundant, farmers may increase their input efforts and budget to maximize yields and to offset poor harvests.

== Arid-zone agriculture ==
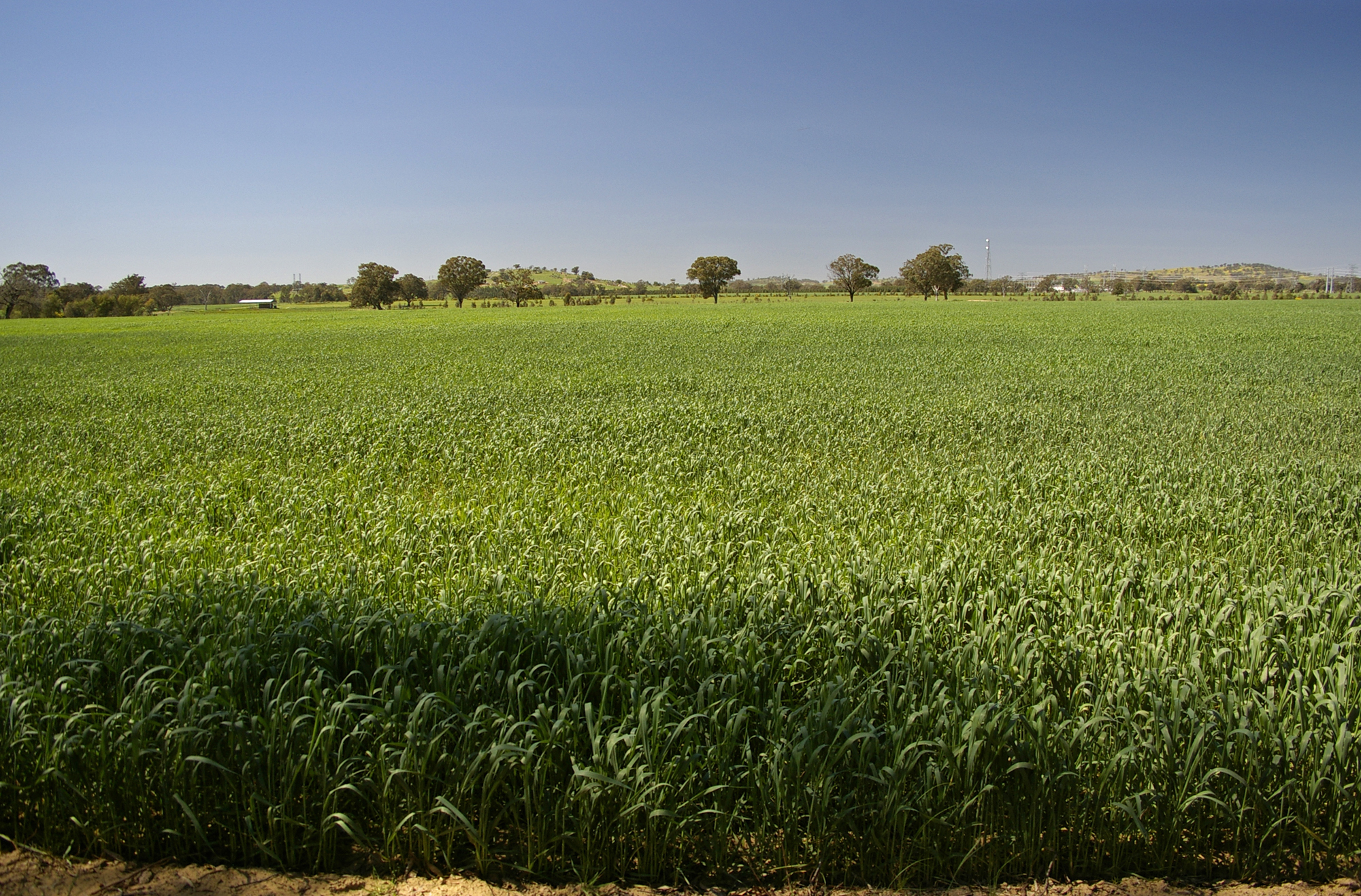
A dryland farming paddock

Arid-zone agriculture, or desert agriculture, is the subject of research and development that includes studies of how to increase the agricultural productivity of lands dominated by a lack of fresh water, an abundance of heat and sunlight, and usually one or more of the following: Extreme winter cold, short rainy season, saline soil or water, strong dry winds, poor soil structure, overgrazing, limited technological development, poverty, or political instability.

The two basic approaches are:

- View the given environmental and socioeconomic characteristics as negative obstacles to be overcome.
- View as many as possible of them as positive resources to be used.

== See also ==
- Agriculture in Israel
- Agriculture in the prehistoric Southwest
- Arid Forest Research Institute
- Biosalinity
- Dust Bowl
- Environmental issues with agriculture
- International Center for Agricultural Research in the Dry Areas
- Irrigation
- Seawater greenhouse
- Small-scale agriculture
- University of Arid Agriculture
- Xerophyte
