= Piki =

Hopi cornmeal bread

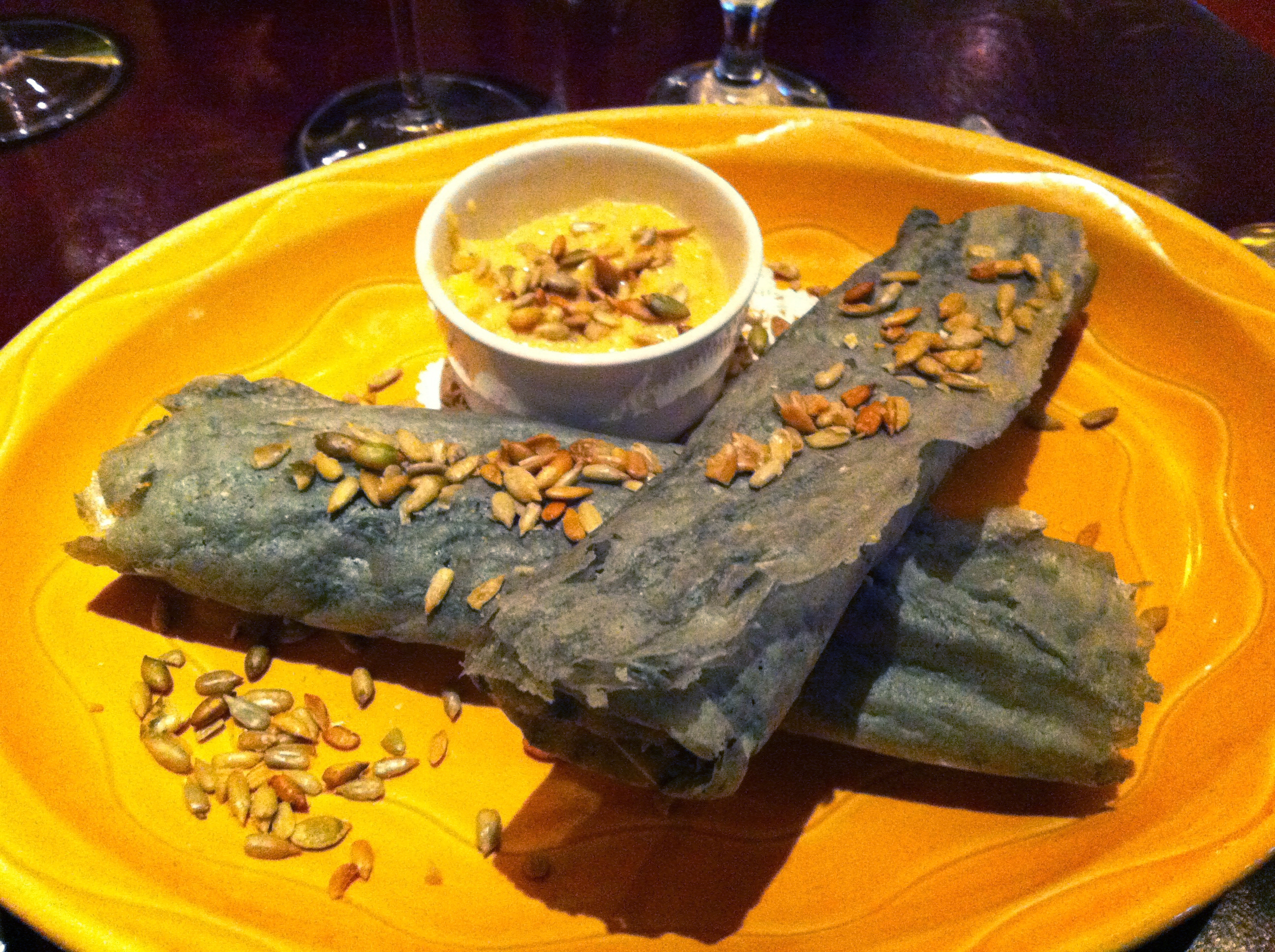
- Piki bread at a hotel restaurant in Santa Fe, New Mexico
- Type: Bread
- Place of origin: United States
- Region or state: Western United States
- Main ingredients: Blue corn meal, ashes, water

Piki is a bread made from blue corn meal used in Hopi cuisine.

== Preparation ==
Blue corn, a staple grain of the Hopi, is first reduced to a fine powder on a metate. It is then mixed with water and burnt ashes of native bushes or juniper trees for purposes of nixtamalization (nutritional modification of corn by means of lime or other alkali). The thin batter is then smeared by hand over a large flat baking stone that has been heated over a fire and coated with oil made from pounded seeds of the native American plants squash and sunflower, and also from the seeds of watermelon, which though originally from Africa, has been in the Americas for at least 500 years. Piki bread bakes almost instantaneously and is peeled from the rock in sheets so thin they are translucent. Several sheets of the bread are often rolled up loosely into flattened scrolls.

Piki takes several days to make from scratch. Piki is prepared by women in various phases of the courtship and marriage ritual, and is eaten by the couple on the morning of the marriage ceremony. In some Hopi pow wows it is handed out by the kachina dancers.

== See also ==
- List of maize dishes
