= Glass Gem Corn =

Variety of maize

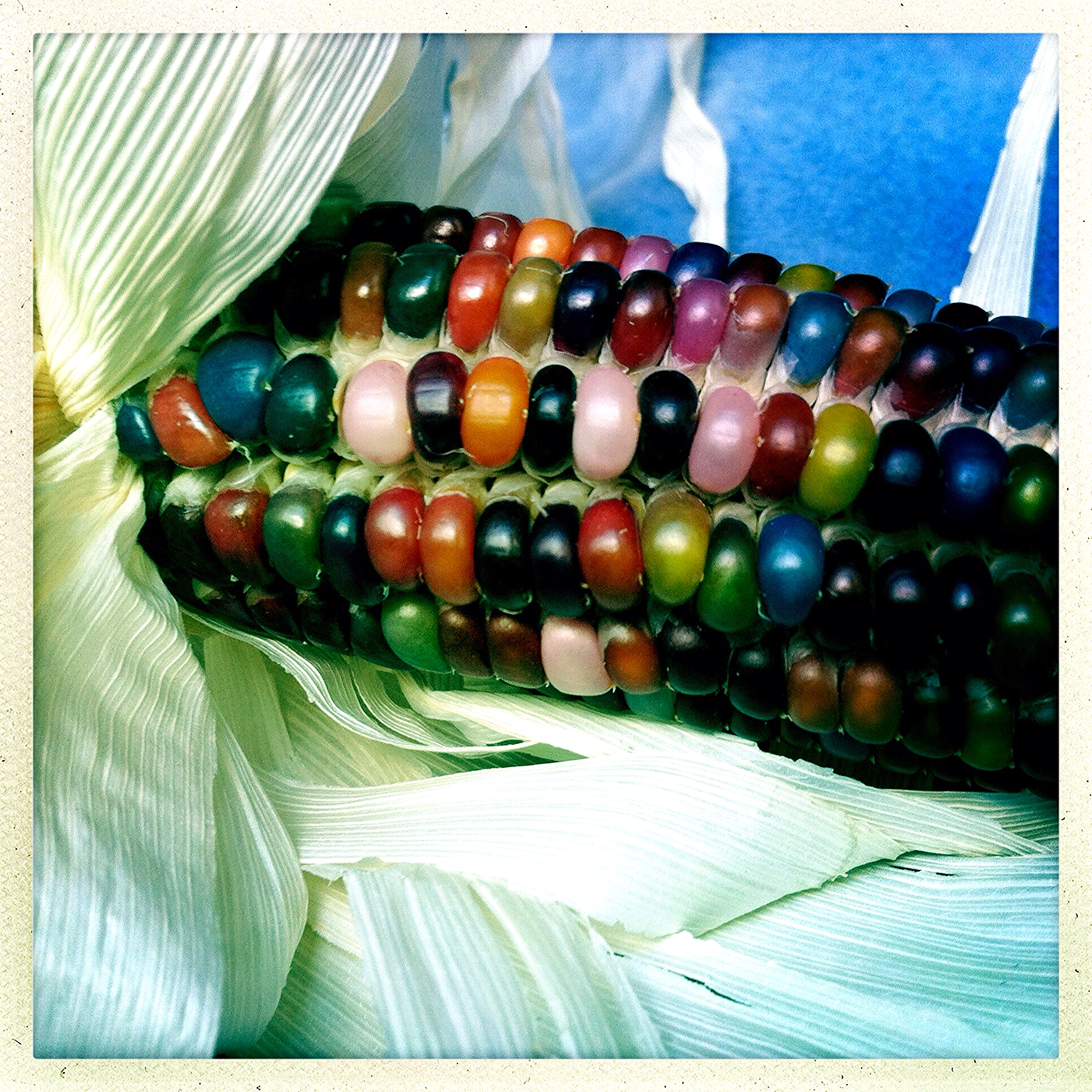
Glass gem corn

Glass Gem Corn is an American heirloom flint corn, a form of maize. A variety of what is called "Indian corn", it is prized for its often translucent rainbow coloring, which is retained even when dried.

Glass Gem Corn has been called the "poster child" for the return to heirloom seeds. It became popular on social media in 2012 due to its unique appearance. Enthusiasts save its seeds to plant again and to trade with others.

Primarily decorative, Glass Gem Corn is popularly used in Fall seasonal decorations. It is also edible, and may be parched and ground and utilized like any other cornmeal, and used in whole kernel form for popcorn.

== History ==
The corn variety was created in the 1980s by Carl Leon Barnes (June 18, 1928 – April 16, 2016), an Oklahoma native also known by the moniker "White Eagle." Barnes is often reported as being "half Cherokee, half Scotch-Irish" but US census records do not support that he had any recent Native American ancestry. His parents, Carrie (nee Simmonds; 1901 – 1988) and Thomas Barnes (1898 – 1984) were both white and born in Kansas to white parents.

Glass Gem corn was created in the 1980s when Barnes cross bred a mixture of Pawnee miniature popcorn, Osage Red Flour, and Osage Greyhorse corns. Barnes isolated the three varieties of ancestral corns from plants which volunteered in his fields. These corns were historically grown by the Cherokee and the Pawnee. This created a small-eared corn with jewel-toned, translucent kernels.

Throughout the 1980 and into the 1990s Barnes continued to grow this corn on his own land but it didn't gain a wider audience until Barnes met Greg Schoen at a native-plant gathering in 1994. Barnes and Schoen became friends and in 1995, Barnes gave Schoen a handful of seeds for the Glass Gem corn.

Through the late 1990s into the early 2000s Barnes and Schoen continued planting Glass Gem Corn in small patches. However, starting in 2005 Schoen and his friend Jose Lucero of Santa Clara Pueblo, New Mexico, began growing the corn among the larger Pueblo and Spanish flour corns grown in the area. This interbreeding gave the smaller rainbow corn deeper color and new robustness. During this time Schoen began calling the rainbow corn Glass Gem. In 2008, Schoen gave seeds to growers in India, Israel, Kenya, Mexico and the U.S. One of the people who received these seeds was Bill McDorman, former executive director of Native Seeds/SEARCH. McDorman used this corn in educational programs sparking interest in this corn. Then in 2012, a picture of Glass Gem went viral. The corn acquired a following, complete with Facebook pages and Instagram accounts. Native Seeds/SEARCH is conserving and making Glass Gem publicly available.

== Cultivation ==
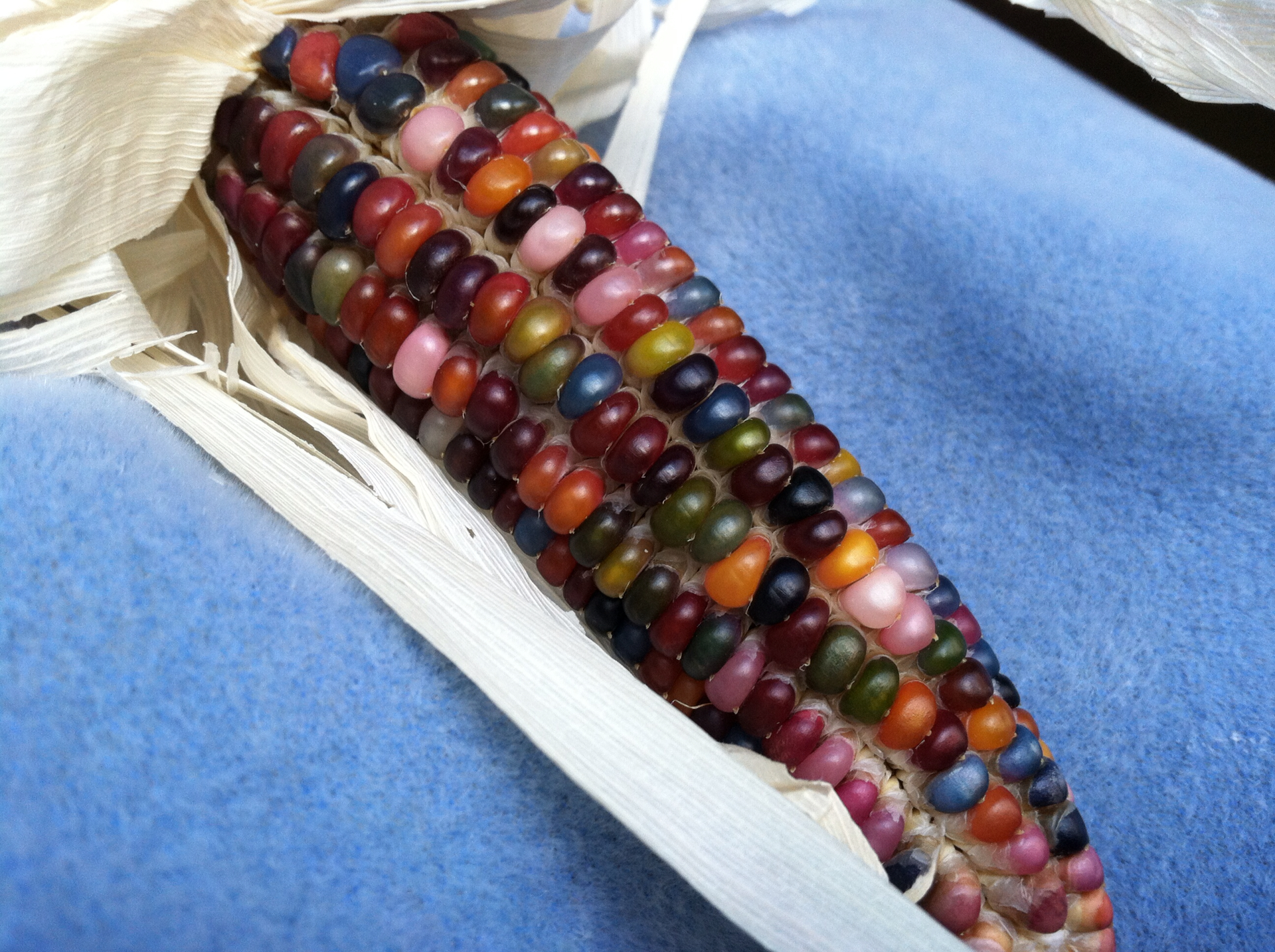
Though created to be decorative, Glass Gem Corn can be ground into meal and used like any other corn

Glass Gem is a fast maturing variety, typically ready to harvest in 110–120 days. Plant seeds after the last frost in the spring and at least 120 days before the 1st expected frost in your location. It grows well in rows 30 inches (76 cm) apart with seeds placed 6–12 inches (15–30 cm) apart. Alternatively, planting three or four seeds in holes spaced 3–4 feet (0.91–1.22 m) apart gives good results. Harvest the corn when the husks are dry and brown.

It is easy to breed this variety of corn for the colors and patterns wanted by using simple selection. Select kernels with the desired properties from as many ears as possible. After repeating this process for two or three years the ears will exhibit the desired properties. Sky blue kernels are the easiest to reproduce. For seed conservation it is necessary to have 200–300 plants to keep the full genetic library of the original seeds.

== See also ==
- Blue corn
- Dent corn
- Field corn
- Flint corn
- List of maize dishes
- Maize
- Popcorn
- Purple corn
