= Summer fallow =

Summer fallow, sometimes called fallow cropland, is cropland that is purposely kept out of production during a regular growing season. Resting the ground in this manner allows one crop to be grown using the moisture and nutrients of more than one crop cycle. The summer fallow technique provides enough extra moisture and nutrients to allow the growth of crops which might otherwise not be possible and is closely associated with dryland farming.

Usually this is done in semi-arid regions in order to conserve moisture for the next season. It also provides additional time for crop residues to break down and return nutrients to the soil for the subsequent crop, though this function has become less important since the widespread adoption of chemical fertilizers enabled farmers to artificially add vital nutrients. Fields which are fallow may be tilled or sprayed to control weeds and conserve moisture in the soil. The 1997 Census of Agriculture reported that 20,900,000 acres (85,000 km^{2}), almost 5% of the 431 million acres (1,740,000 km^{2}) of all cropland, was fallow that year.
