= Purple corn =

Variety of flint maize

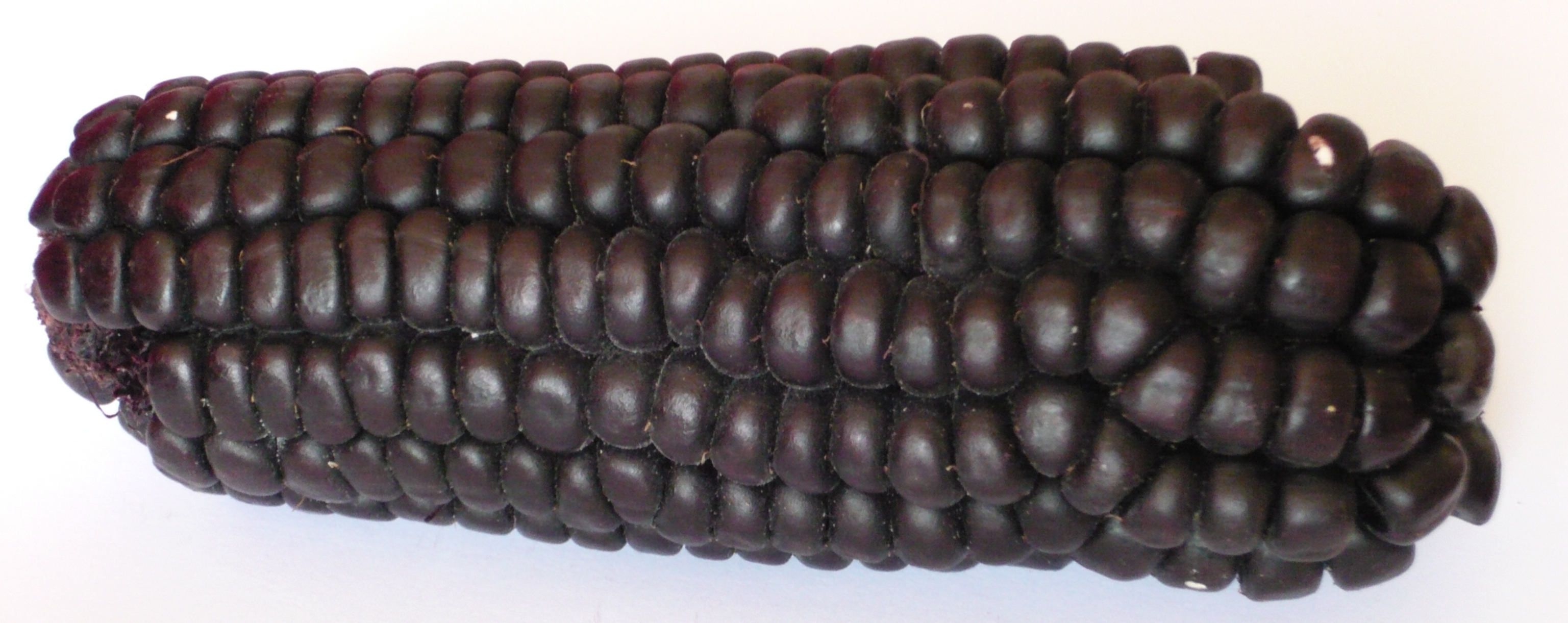
Purple Corn

Purple corn (Spanish: maíz morado) or purple maize is group of flint maize varieties (Zea mays indurata) originating in South America, descended from a common ancestral variety termed "kʼculli" in Quechua. It is most commonly grown in the Andes of Peru, Bolivia and Ecuador.

== Uses ==
Common in Peru, purple corn is used in chicha morada, a drink made by boiling ground purple corn kernels with pineapple, cinnamon, clove, and sugar, and in mazamorra, a type of pudding". In Bolivia, purple corn "Kuli" is used in Api, a smoothie served hot.

== Color chemistry: anthocyanins ==
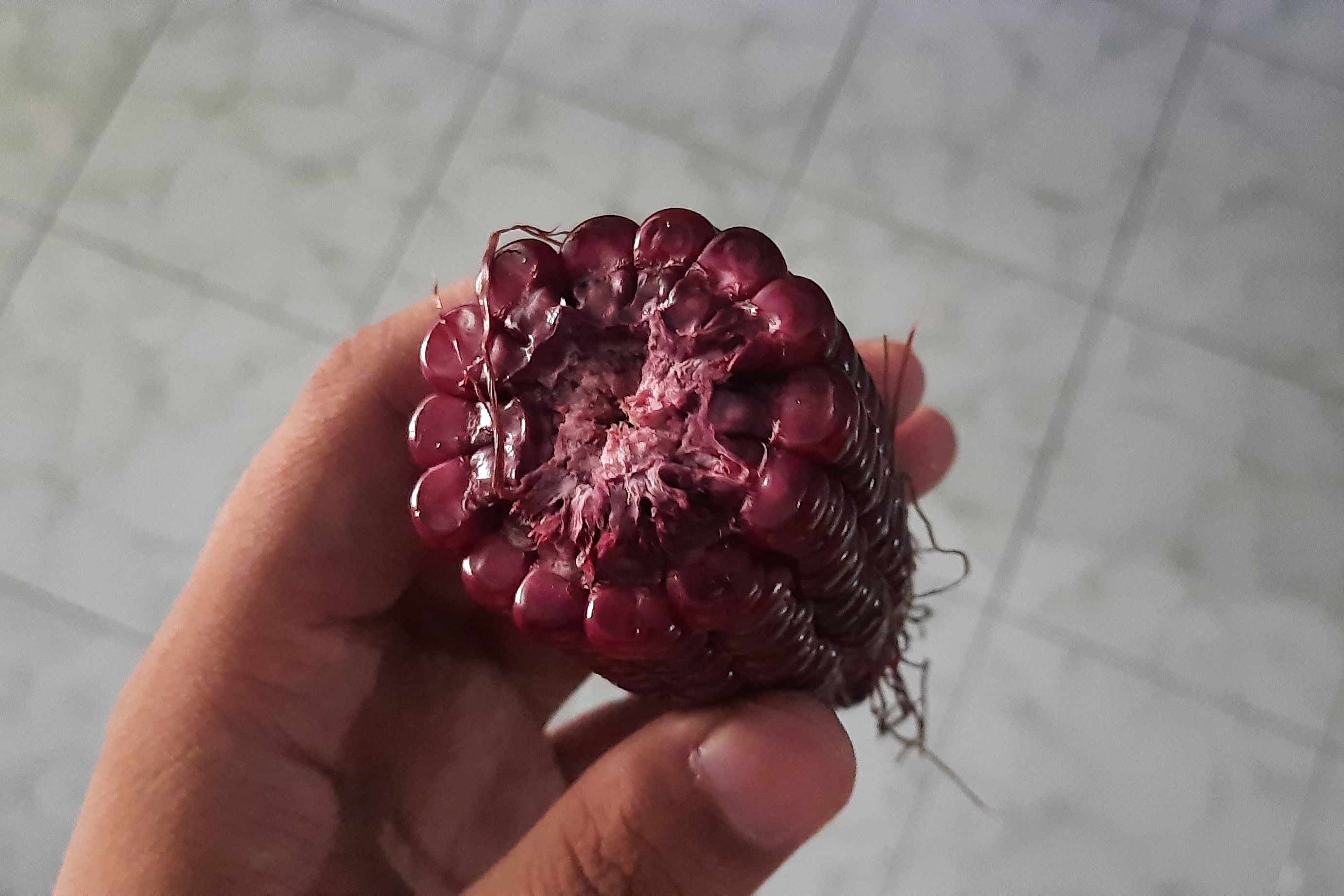
The cob is also purple in color.

The pigment giving purple corn its vivid color derives from an exceptional content of a class of polyphenols called anthocyanins. Cyanidin 3-O-glucoside, also called chrysanthemin, is the major anthocyanin in purple corn kernels, comprising about 73% of all anthocyanins present. Other anthocyanins identified are pelargonidin 3-O-β-D-glucoside, peonidin 3-O-β-D-glucoside, cyanidin 3-O-β-D-(6-malonyl-glucoside), pelargonidin 3-O-β-D-(6-malonyl-glucoside) and peonidin 3-O-β-D-(6-malonyl-glucoside). Similar results for anthocyanin content were found from a variety of purple corn grown in China.

Evaluating growing conditions for anthocyanin and total polyphenol content, one research group found that field location was an important determinant, whereas seedling density and soil potassium content were not.

For ease of extractions, scientists have explored components of the purple corn plant for yield, such as kernels, cob and husk, possibly allowing use of a plentiful, non-edible residual biomass in cobs or husks. Husks of the purple corn plant contain about ten times higher content of anthocyanins than do kernels.

== See also ==
- Blue corn
- Flint corn
- Glass gem corn
- List of maize dishes
- Maize
