= Flint corn =

Variety of maize

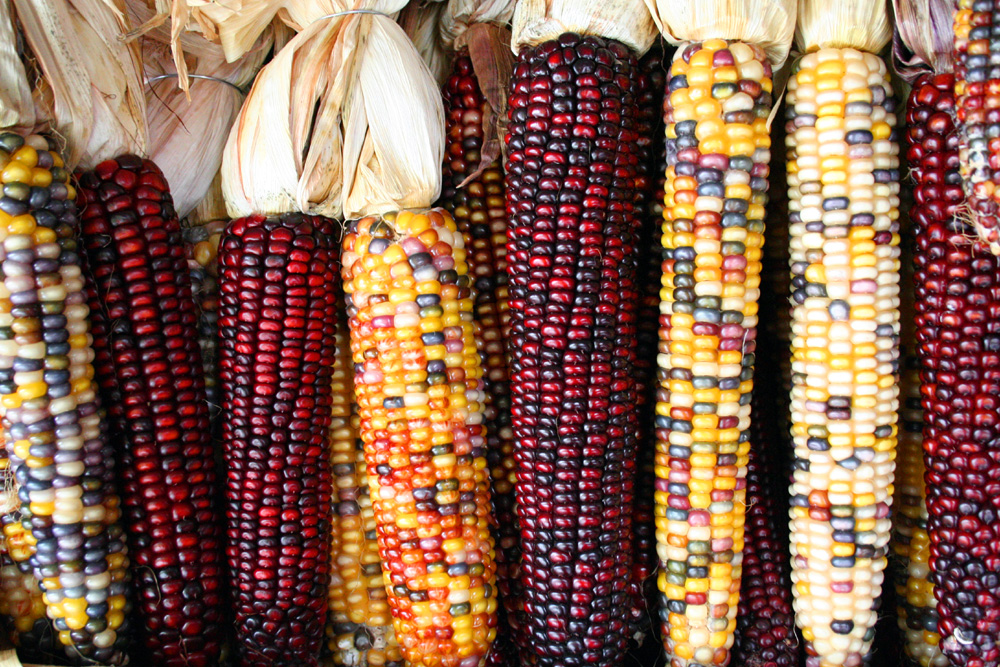
- Flint corn is named for its hard kernels, which typically come in a multitude of colors
- Species: Zea mays
- Variety: Zea mays var. indurata

Flint corn (Zea mays var. indurata; also known as Indian corn or sometimes calico corn) is a variant of maize, the same species as common corn. With less soft starch than dent corn (Zea mays indentata), flint corn does not have the dents in each kernel from which dent corn gets its name. To protect the soft endosperm, each kernel has a hard outer layer which is likened to being hard as flint, hence the name. It is one of six major types of corn, the others being dent corn, pod corn, popcorn, flour corn, and sweet corn.

== History ==
Flint corn has a long history of cultivation by Native Americans. Researchers have identified flint corn cultivation beginning in the northwest ex-Mexican territories. Flint corn slowly spread from the American southwest through the southeast by about 1 CE and into the northeastern USA and southern Canada by about 1500 CE. Maize (corn) was initially domesticated in Mexico by native peoples about 9,000 years ago. They used many generations of selective breeding to transform a wild teosinte grass with small grains into the rich source of food that is modern Zea mays.

== Distinctive traits ==
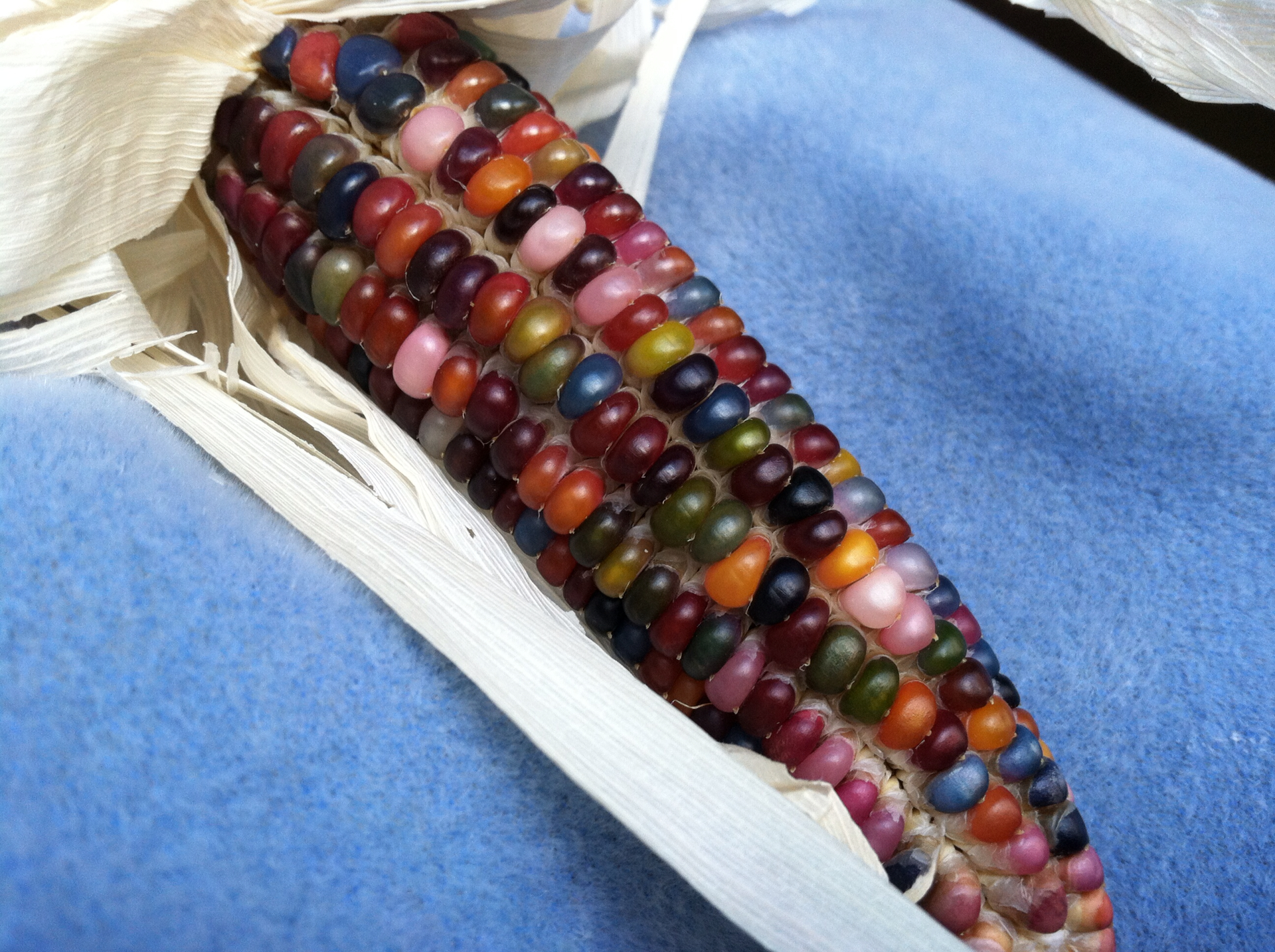
Glass Gem Corn, an heirloom flint corn variety from Oklahoma

Because flint corn has a very low water content, it is more freezing-resistant than other vegetables. It was the only Vermont crop to survive New England's infamous "Year Without a Summer" of 1816.

=== Coloration ===
The coloration of flint corn often differs from white and yellow dent corns, many of which were later bred. Most flint corn is multi-colored. Like the Linnaeus variant of maize, any kernel may contain the yellow pigment zeaxanthin but at more varying concentrations.

Regional varieties with specific coloration include blue corn and purple corn. Glass Gem corn became internet famous in 2012 when photos of this brightly colored flint corn went viral.

== Uses ==
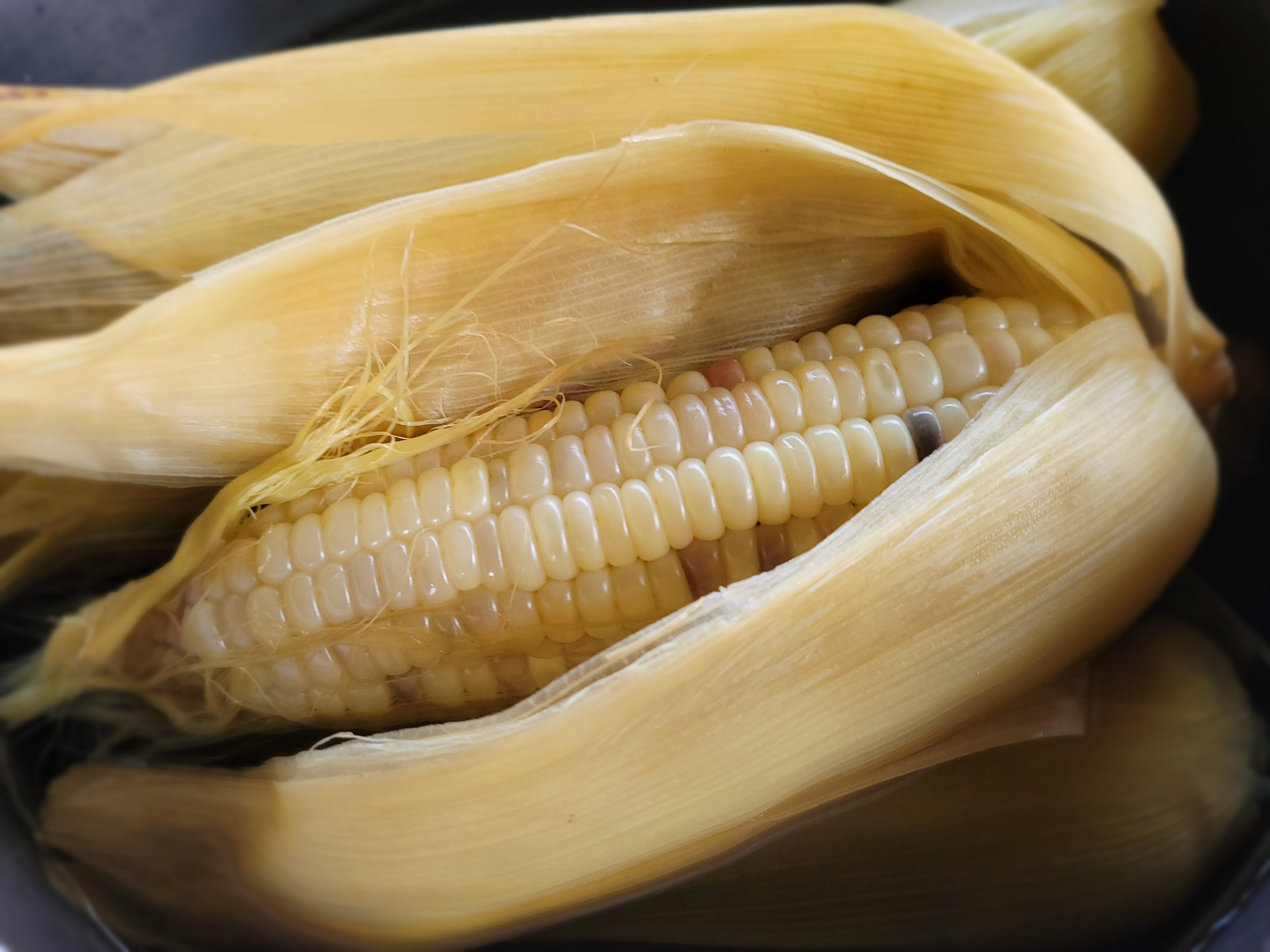
Boiled Visayan white corn, an heirloom flint corn variety from the Philippines

Popcorn (Zea mays everta, "corn turned inside out") is considered a variant of this type. It has a hard, slightly translucent kernel.

Flint corn is also the type of corn preferred for making hominy, a staple food in the Americas since pre-Columbian times.

In the Philippines, the Visayan white corn is an heirloom flint corn variety that is a secondary staple cereal in the country. It descended from the corn introduced by the Spanish during the early Spanish colonial period (1565–1898). It can be eaten boiled or grilled, used in a wide variety of traditional dishes as an ingredient, or ground into grits that are eaten as a common rice substitute.

In the United States, the flint corn cultivars that have large proportions of kernels with hues outside the yellow range are primarily used ornamentally as part of Thanksgiving decorations. They are often called either "ornamental corn" or "Indian corn", although each of those names also has other meanings. These varieties can be popped and eaten as popcorn, although many people incorrectly believe that such colored varieties are not palatable or are poisonous.

== See also ==
- Blue corn
- Glass gem corn
- Maize
- Purple corn
