= Callistephin =

Names
- IUPAC name 5,7‐Dihydroxy‐2‐(4‐hydroxyphenyl)‐3‐{[(2S,3R,4S,5S,6R)‐3,4,5‐trihydroxy‐6‐(hydroxymethyl)oxan‐2‐yl]oxy}‐1λ^{4}‐chromen‐1‐ylium
- Systematic IUPAC name 5,7-Dihydroxy-2-(4-hydroxyphenyl)-3-chromeniumyl β-D-glucopyranoside
- Other names Pelargonidin-3-O-glucoside

Identifiers
CAS Number	47684-27-5
3D model (JSmol)	Interactive image
ChEBI	CHEBI:31967
ChemSpider	391782
KEGG	C12137
PubChem CID	443648
UNII	W623YHH61A
- InChI: InChI=1S/C21H20O10/c22-8-16-17(26)18(27)19(28)21(31-16)30-15-7-12-13(25)5-11(24)6-14(12)29-20(15)9-1-3-10(23)4-2-9/h1-7,16-19,21-22,26-28H,8H2,(H2-,23,24,25)/p+1/t16-,17-,18+,19-,21-/m1/s1 Key: ABVCUBUIXWJYSE-GQUPQBGVSA-O; InChI=1/C21H20O10/c22-8-16-17(26)18(27)19(28)21(31-16)30-15-7-12-13(25)5-11(24)6-14(12)29-20(15)9-1-3-10(23)4-2-9/h1-7,16-19,21-22,26-28H,8H2,(H2-,23,24,25)/p+1/t16-,17-,18+,19-,21-/m1/s1 Key: ABVCUBUIXWJYSE-OAYIZRCEBP
- SMILES: C1=CC(=CC=C1C2=[O+]C3=CC(=CC(=C3C=C2O[C@H]4[C@@H]([C@H]([C@@H]([C@H](O4)CO)O)O)O)O)O)O

Properties
Chemical formula	C_{21}H_{21}O_{10}
Molar mass	433.389 g·mol^{−1}
UV-vis (λ_{max})	505 nm
- Except where otherwise noted, data are given for materials in their standard state (at 25 °C [77 °F], 100 kPa). Infobox references

Callistephin is an anthocyanin. It is the 3-O-glucoside of pelargonidin.

It is found in pomegranate juice, in strawberries, and in purple corn. It is also found in the berry skins of Cabernet Sauvignon and Pinot Noir grapes (Vitis vinifera L.).

== See also ==
- Callistephus
