= Peonidin-3-O-glucoside =

Names
- IUPAC name 3-(β-D-Glucopyranosyloxy)-4′,5,7-trihydroxy-3′-methoxyflavylium
- Systematic IUPAC name 5,7-Dihydroxy-2-(4-hydroxy-3-methoxyphenyl)-3-{[(2S,3R,4S,5S,6R)-3,4,5-trihydroxy-6-(hydroxymethyl)oxan-2-yl]oxy}-1λ^{4}-benzopyran-1-ylium
- Other names Peonidin-3-glucoside; Peonidin 3-O-glucoside

Identifiers
CAS Number	68795-37-9; 6906-39-4 (chloride)
3D model (JSmol)	Interactive image
ChEBI	CHEBI:74793
ChemSpider	391786
KEGG	C12141
PubChem CID	443654
CompTox Dashboard (EPA)	DTXSID70988503
- InChI: InChI=1S/C22H22O11/c1-30-15-4-9(2-3-12(15)25)21-16(7-11-13(26)5-10(24)6-14(11)31-21)32-22-20(29)19(28)18(27)17(8-23)33-22/h2-7,17-20,22-23,27-29H,8H2,1H3,(H2-,24,25,26)/p+1/t17-,18-,19+,20-,22-/m1/s1 Key: ZZWPMFROUHHAKY-OUUKCGNVSA-O
- SMILES: COC1=C(C=CC(=C1)C2=C(C=C3C(=CC(=CC3=[O+]2)O)O)OC4C(C(C(C(O4)CO)O)O)O)O

Properties
Chemical formula	C_{22}H_{23}O^{+}_{11} C_{22}H_{23}O_{11}Cl (chloride)
Molar mass	463.41 g/mol 498.9 g/mol (chloride)
- Except where otherwise noted, data are given for materials in their standard state (at 25 °C [77 °F], 100 kPa). Infobox references

Peonidin-3-O-glucoside is anthocyanin. It is found in fruits and berries, in red Vitis vinifera grapes and red wine, in red onions and in purple corn. It is dark red to purple in colour.

== See also ==
- Phenolic compounds in wine
