= Gary Paul Nabhan =

American environmentalist and ethnobotanist (born 1952)

- Born: 17 March 1952 (age 74); Gary, Indiana, U.S.
- Education: Prescott College, University of Arizona
- Known for: Natural/Cultural History writings Cofounding "Native Seeds/SEARCH"; Pollinator Decline; Local foods Seed saving Collaborative conservation
- Awards: John Burroughs Medal; MacArthur Fellowship, Pew Conservation Scholar; Southwest Book Award, Lannan Literary Award; Kellogg Endowed Chair
- Scientific career
- Fields: Ecology, ethnobotany
- Institutions: Native Seeds/SEARCH; Sabores Sin Fronteras Arizona-Sonora Desert Museum; Northern Arizona University; University of Arizona.

Gary Paul Nabhan (/ˈnæbhæn/; born 1952) is an agricultural ecologist, ethnobotanist, Ecumenical Franciscan Brother, and author whose work has focused primarily on the plants and cultures of the desert Southwest. He is considered a pioneer in the local food movement and the heirloom seed saving movement.

== Background ==
Nabhan is the grandson of Lebanese and Syrian refugees. He was raised in Gary, Indiana. He excelled at William A. Wirt High School, which gave him the opportunity to attend Cornell College in Mount Vernon, Iowa, for 18 months. He then transferred to Prescott College in Prescott, Arizona, earning a B.A. in Environmental Biology in 1974, and has remained in-state ever since. He has an M.S. in plant sciences (horticulture) from the University of Arizona (1978) and a Ph.D. in the interdisciplinary arid lands resource sciences also from the University of Arizona ("Papago Fields: Arid Lands Ethnobotany and Agricultural Ecology," 1983). During this time, he started working with, and learning from, the Tohono Oʼodham American Indians.

He co-founded Native Seeds/SEARCH while working at the University of Arizona. It is a non-profit conservation organization which works to preserve indigenous southwestern agricultural plants as well as knowledge of their uses (1982–1993). He then served as director of science at the Arizona-Sonora Desert Museum (1993–2000), before becoming founding director of the Center for Sustainable Environments at Northern Arizona University in Flagstaff, AZ (2000–2008). In 2008 he moved back south to Tucson and joined the University of Arizona faculty as a research social scientist with the Southwest Center, where he now serves as the Kellogg Endowed Chair in Southwestern Borderlands Food and Water Security. He sits on several boards of conservation organizations.

As detailed in his writings, he married at a young age and had a family, but he was divorced in the late 1980s, later marrying a second time, this time with Caroline Wilson in the early 1990s. He is currently married to his third wife, Laurie Monti (formerly of Northern Arizona University) and lives near Patagonia, Arizona on a five-acre homestead to the southwest of town. He farms a diverse set of heirloom fruit and nut varieties from the Spanish Mission era and from the Middle Eastern homelands of his Lebanese ancestors, as well as heritage grains and beans adapted to arid climates.

== Contributions ==
The unifying theme of Nabhan's work is how to avert the impoverishment and endangerment of ecological and cultural relationships, while celebrating the traditional ecological knowledge of the agrarian communities. He has played a catalytic role in the multicultural, collaborative conservation movement, being one of the co-authors of its populist manifesto, "An Invitation to the Radical Center." Nabhan was among the first creative non-fiction writers to link the loss of biodiversity to the loss of cultural diversity. In his book with Stephen Trimble, The Geography of Childhood, he was among the first popular writers to show concern with the loss of children's access to the natural world. He has been a significant contributor in calling attention to the environmental issue of pollinator decline. He founded the Forgotten Pollinators Campaign, the Migratory Pollinators Conservation Initiative, and attempts to restore nectar corridors for pollinators in bi-national watersheds around his home in Patagonia, Arizona, which he calls the "pollinator diversity capitol of the United States."

In addition to the articles and books on pollination ecology for which he has been sole author or editor, he co-authored with Stephen L. Buchmann one of the key works on the topic The Forgotten Pollinators from Island Press (1996).

He is a champion of rainwater harvesting, which he implements in his own orchard and gardens, and he has written introductions on this topic in permaculture books by Bill Mollison and Brad Lancaster.

== Awards ==
- Honorary PhDs: Carleton College (2009) and Unity College, Maine.
- MOCA local genius award, Tucson, 2013.
- Named Utne Reader visionary, 2011.
- Quivira Coalition's Outstanding Leadership Award in Research, 2007
- Saveur magazine Best 100 Food Initiatives, 2002 and 2005
- Calvin Sperling Award, Crop Science Society of America, 2003
- Emil Haury Award, Western Parks and Monuments Association, 2004–2005
- Lifetime Achievement Award, Society for Conservation Biology, 2001
- Western States Book Award, 1999
- Southwest Book Award, 1986 and 1999
- Lannan Literary Award, 1999
- Pew Scholarship for Conservation and the Environment, 1991
- Premio Gaia for Creative Endeavors regarding the Environment, Sicilian government, 1990
- MacArthur Fellowship, 1990–1995
- The John Burroughs Medal for distinguished natural history writing, for Gathering the Desert, 1986.

== Books ==
- Nabhan, G. P. 2024. Against the American Grain: A Borderlands History of Resistance. High Road Books.
- Nabhan, G. P. & D. S. Pinera. 2023. Agave Spirits: The Past, Present, and Future of Mezcals. W. W. Norton.
- Nabhan, G. P. 2021. Jesus for Farmers and Fishers: Justice for All Those Marginalized by Our Food System. Broadleaf Books.
- Nabhan, G.P. 2020. The Nature of Desert. Tucson: University of Arizona Press.
- Nabhan, G.P. 2018. Mesquite: An Arboreal Love Affair. White River Junction: Chelsea Green Publishing.
- Nabhan, G.P. 2018. Food from the Radical Center. Washington, D.C.: Island Press.
- Nabhan, G.P. 2016. Ethnobiology for the Future: Linking Cultural and Ecological Diversity. Tucson: University of Arizona Press.
- Nabhan, G.P. 2014. Cumin, Camels, and Caravans: A Spice Odyssey. Berkeley: University of California Press.
- Nabhan, G.P. 2013. Food, Genes, and Culture – Eating Right for Your Origins. Washington, D.C.: Island Press.
- Nabhan, G.P. 2013. Growing Food in a Hotter, Drier Land – Lessons from Desert Farmers on Adapting to Climate Uncertainty. White River Junction: Chelsea Green Publishing.
- Nabhan, G.P. 2012. Desert Terroir, Exploring the Unique Flavors and Sundry Places of the Borderlands. University of Texas Press.
- Nabhan, G.P., K. Kraft and K.M.Freise. 2011. Chasing Chiles: Hot Spots along the Pepper Trail. White River Junction: Chelsea Green Publishing.
- Nabhan, G.P. 2008. Arab/American: Landscape, Culture and Cuisine in Two Deserts. Tucson: University of Arizona Press.
- Nabhan, G.P. 2008. Where Our Food Comes From: Retracing Nikolay Vavilov's Quest to End Famine. Washington, D.C.: Island Press.
- Nabhan, G.P. 2008. Heritage Farming in the Southwest Borderlands. Oro Valley, Arizona: Western Parks Association.
- Nabhan, G.P (ed.).2008. Renewing America's Food Traditions: Saving and Savoring the Continent's Most Endangered Foods. White River Junction: Chelsea Green Publishing.
- Nabhan, G.P. 2008. Renewing the Food Traditions of Chile Pepper Nation Tucson: Arizona – Sonora Desert Museum Press.
- Nabhan, G.P. et al. (eds.) 2007. Five Ways to Value Western Landscapes. Flagstaff: NAU/CSE.
- Nabhan, G.P. 2006. Renewing the Food Traditions of Salmon Nation. Portland: Ecotrust.
- Nabhan, G.P. 2004. Why Some Like It Hot: Food, Genes and Cultural Diversity. Washington, D.C.: Island Press.
- Nabhan, G.P. and A. Rood. 2004. Renewing America's Food Traditions. Flagstaff: NAU/CSE.
- Nabhan, G.P., M. Coder and S. Smith (eds.). 2004. Woodlands in Crisis: A Legacy of Lost Biodiversity on the Colorado Plateau. Bilby Research Center Occasional Papers No. 2. Tucson: University of Arizona Press.
- Nabhan, G.P. 2004. Cross-Pollinations: the Marriage of Science and Poetry. Minneapolis: Milkweed Editions.
- Nabhan, G.P. and A.-G. Valenzuela-Zapata. 2004. Tequila!: A Natural and Cultural History. Tucson: University of Arizona Press.
- Nabhan, G.P. 2003. Conserving Migratory Pollinators and Their Corridors in Western North America. Tucson: University of Arizona Press.
- Nabhan, G.P. 2003. Singing the Turtles to Sea: The Comcaac (Seri) Art and Science of Reptiles. Berkeley: University of California Press.
- Nabhan, G.P. (ed.) 2002. Safeguarding the Uniqueness of the Colorado Plateau: An Ecoregional Assessment of Biocultural Diversity. Flagstaff: NAU/CSE, Terralingua and Grand Canyon Wildlands Council.
- Nabhan, G.P. 2001. Coming Home to Eat: The Pleasures and Politics of Local Foods. New York: W.W. Norton.
- Nabhan, G.P., A Astorga and J. Miller. 2001. Efrain of the Sonoran Desert: A Lizard's Life Among the Seri Indians. El Paso: Cinco Puntos Press.
- Tuxhill, J. and G.P. Nabhan. 1998. Plants and protected areas: a guide to in situ management. Cheltenham: Stanley Thornes.
- Nabhan, G.P. 1998. Creatures of Habitat: Poems of creatures, seeds, and their places: with new translations of Native American songs. San Francisco: Tangram Press.
- Nabhan, G.P. 1997. Cultures of Habitat: on nature, culture and story. Washington, D.C.: Counterpoint Press. ch 1
- Nabhan, G.P. and S. Buchmann. 1996. Forgotten Pollinators Washington, D.C.: Island Press.
- Nabhan, G.P. and C. Wilson. 1995. Canyons of Color: Utah's Slickrock Wildlands. San Francisco: HarperCollins/West.
- Nabhan, G.P. and M. Klett. 1995. Desert Legends: Re-Storying the Sonoran Borderlands. New York: Henry Holt.
- Nabhan, G.P. and J.L. Carr. (eds). 1995. Ironwood: An Ecological and Cultural Keystone of the Sonoran Desert. Conservation International study. Washington D.C. and Chicago: University of Chicago Press.
- Nabhan, G.P. and S. Trimble. 1994. The Geography of Childhood: Why Children Need Wild Places. Boston: Beacon Press.
- Nabhan, G.P. (ed.) 1994. Counting Sheep. Tucson: University of Arizona Press.
- Nabhan, G.P. 1993. Songbirds, truffles and wolves: an American naturalist in Italy. New York: Penguin.
- Nabhan, G.P. 1989. Enduring Seeds: Native American Agriculture and Wild Plant Conservation. San Francisco: North Point Press.
- Nabhan, G.P. 1986. Saguaro: A View of Saguaro National Monument and the Tucson Basin. Tucson: Southwestern Parks and Monuments Association.
- Nabhan, G.P. 1985. Gathering the Desert. Tucson: University of Arizona Press.
- Nabhan, G.P. 1982. The Desert Smells Like Rain: a Naturalist in O'Odham Country. San Francisco: North Point Press.
