= Pelargonidin =

Red anthocyanidin pigment found in certain flowers and fruits

Names
- IUPAC name 3,4′,5,7-Tetrahydroxyflavylium
- Systematic IUPAC name 3,5,7-Trihydroxy-2-(4-hydroxyphenyl)-1λ^{4}-benzopyran-4-ylium

Identifiers
| CAS Number | 134-04-3 |
| 3D model (JSmol) | Interactive image |
| ChEBI | CHEBI:25863 |
| ChEMBL | ChEMBL1197905 |
| ChemSpider | 389676 |
| KEGG | C05904 |
| PubChem CID | 440832 |
| UNII | DFL6200791 |
| CompTox Dashboard (EPA) | DTXSID40861793 |
- InChI: InChI=1S/C15H10O5/c16-9-3-1-8(2-4-9)15-13(19)7-11-12(18)5-10(17)6-14(11)20-15/h1-7H,(H3-,16,17,18,19)/p+1 Key: XVFMGWDSJLBXDZ-UHFFFAOYSA-O; InChI=1/C15H10O5/c16-9-3-1-8(2-4-9)15-13(19)7-11-12(18)5-10(17)6-14(11)20-15/h1-7H,(H3-,16,17,18,19)/p+1 Key: XVFMGWDSJLBXDZ-IKLDFBCSAF
- SMILES: C1=CC(=CC=C1C2=C(C=C3C(=CC(=CC3=[O+]2)O)O)O)O

Properties
| Chemical formula | C_{15}H_{11}O_{5}^{+} |
| Molar mass | 271.24 g/mol |
- Except where otherwise noted, data are given for materials in their standard state (at 25 °C [77 °F], 100 kPa). verify (what is ?) Infobox references

Pelargonidin is an anthocyanidin, a type of plant pigment producing a characteristic orange color used in food and industrial dyes.

== Natural occurrences ==
=== Presence in flowers ===
Pelargonidin can be found in red geraniums (Geraniaceae). It is the predominant pigment causing the red coloration in the spathes of Philodendron (Araceae). The orange-coloured flowers of blue pimpernel (Anagallis monelli, Myrsinaceae) have a higher concentration of pelargonidin pigment. Red and Pink Roses (Rosa) obtain their color from this phytochemical.

=== Presence in food ===
Pelargonidin can be found in berries such as ripe raspberries and strawberries, as well as blueberries, blackberries, cranberries but also in saskatoon berries and chokeberries. It is also found in plums and pomegranates. Pelargonidin gives red radishes their color.

It is present in large amounts in kidney beans.

== Glycosides ==
In many plant systems, Pelargonidin can be added to a glucose molecule to form Pelargonidin 3-glucoside (callistephin). This is done by the 3GT, anthocyanin 3-O-glucosyltransferase gene.

Pelargonidin 3-glucoside.

However this glucosidation reduces its antioxidant activity, and changes the wavelength of max light absorbance from 520 nm to 516 nm.

Acylated pelargonidin glycosides can be found in red-purple flowers of Ipomoea purpurea.

== See also ==
- List of phytochemicals in food
- List of compounds with carbon number 15
