= Chrysanthemin =

Names
- IUPAC name (2S,3R,4S,5S,6R)-2-[2-(3,4-dihydroxyphenyl)-5,7-dihydroxychromenylium-3-yl]oxy-6-(hydroxymethyl)oxane-3,4,5-triol chloride
- Other names Chrysontenin; Glucocyanidin; Asterin; Chrysanthemin; Purple corn color Kuromanin; Kuromanin chloride Cyanidin 3-glucoside Cyanidol 3-glucoside Cyanidine 3-glucoside Cyanidin 3-O-glucoside cyanidin-3-O-beta-D-glucoside; Cyanidin 3-monoglucoside C3G

Identifiers
CAS Number	7084-24-4
3D model (JSmol)	Interactive image
ChemSpider	170681
ECHA InfoCard	100.027.622
KEGG	C08604
PubChem CID	197081
UNII	8X15R84UEM
CompTox Dashboard (EPA)	DTXSID401028798
- InChI: InChI=1S/C21H20O11.ClH/c22-7-16-17(27)18(28)19(29)21(32-16)31-15-6-10-12(25)4-9(23)5-14(10)30-20(15)8-1-2-11(24)13(26)3-8;/h1-6,16-19,21-22,27-29H,7H2,(H3-,23,24,25,26);1H/t16-,17-,18+,19-,21-;/m1./s1 Key: YTMNONATNXDQJF-UBNZBFALSA-N; InChI=1/C21H20O11.ClH/c22-7-16-17(27)18(28)19(29)21(32-16)31-15-6-10-12(25)4-9(23)5-14(10)30-20(15)8-1-2-11(24)13(26)3-8;/h1-6,16-19,21-22,27-29H,7H2,(H3-,23,24,25,26);1H/t16-,17-,18+,19-,21-;/m1./s1 Key: YTMNONATNXDQJF-UBNZBFALBB
- SMILES: [Cl-].O(c1c([o+]c2c(c1)c(O)cc(O)c2)c3ccc(O)c(O)c3)[C@@H]4O[C@@H]([C@@H](O)[C@H](O)[C@H]4O)CO

Properties
Chemical formula	C_{21}H_{21}O_{11}^{+}, Cl^{−} C_{21}H_{21}ClO_{11}
Molar mass	484.83 g/mol (chloride); 449.38 g/mol
- Except where otherwise noted, data are given for materials in their standard state (at 25 °C [77 °F], 100 kPa). verify (what is ?) Infobox references

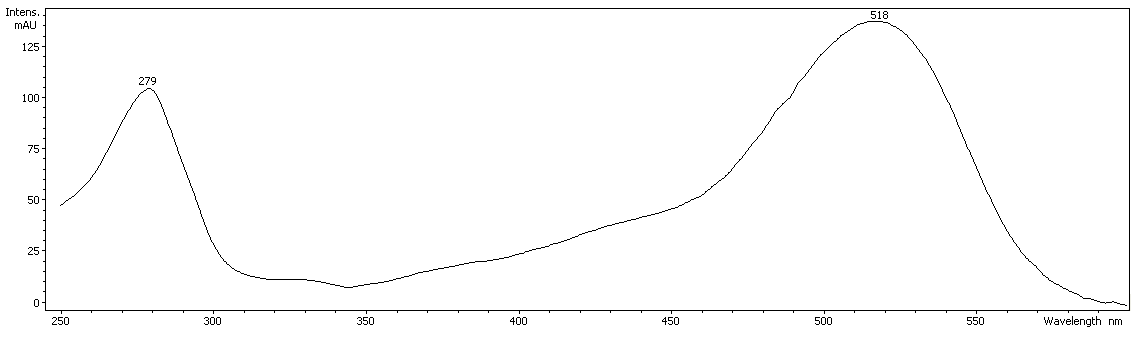
UV visible spectrum of cyanidin 3-O-glucoside

Chrysanthemin is an anthocyanin. It is the 3-glucoside of cyanidin (kuromanin).

== Natural occurrences ==
Chrysanthemin can be found in the roselle plant (Hibiscus sabdariffa, Malvaceae), different Japanese angiosperms, Rhaponticum (Asteraceae), The fruits of the smooth arrowwood (Viburnum dentatum, Caprifoliaceae) appear blue. One of the major pigments is cyanidin 3-glucoside, but the total mixture is very complex.

=== In food ===
Chrysanthemin has been detected in blackcurrant pomace, European elderberry, red raspberries, soybean seed coats, Victoria plum, peach, lychee, and açaí. It is found in red oranges and black rice.

It is the major anthocyanin in purple corn (Zea mays). Purple corn is approved in Japan and listed in the "Existing Food Additive List" as purple corn color.

== Biosynthesis ==
The biosynthesis of cyanidin 3-O-glucoside in Escherichia coli was demonstrated by means of genetic engineering.

In Arabidopsis thaliana, a glycosyltransferase, UGT79B1, is involved in the anthocyanin biosynthetic pathway. UGT79B1 protein converts cyanidin 3-O-glucoside to cyanidin 3-O-xylosyl(1→2)glucoside.
