= Sears-Kay Ruin =

- U.S. National Register of Historic Places
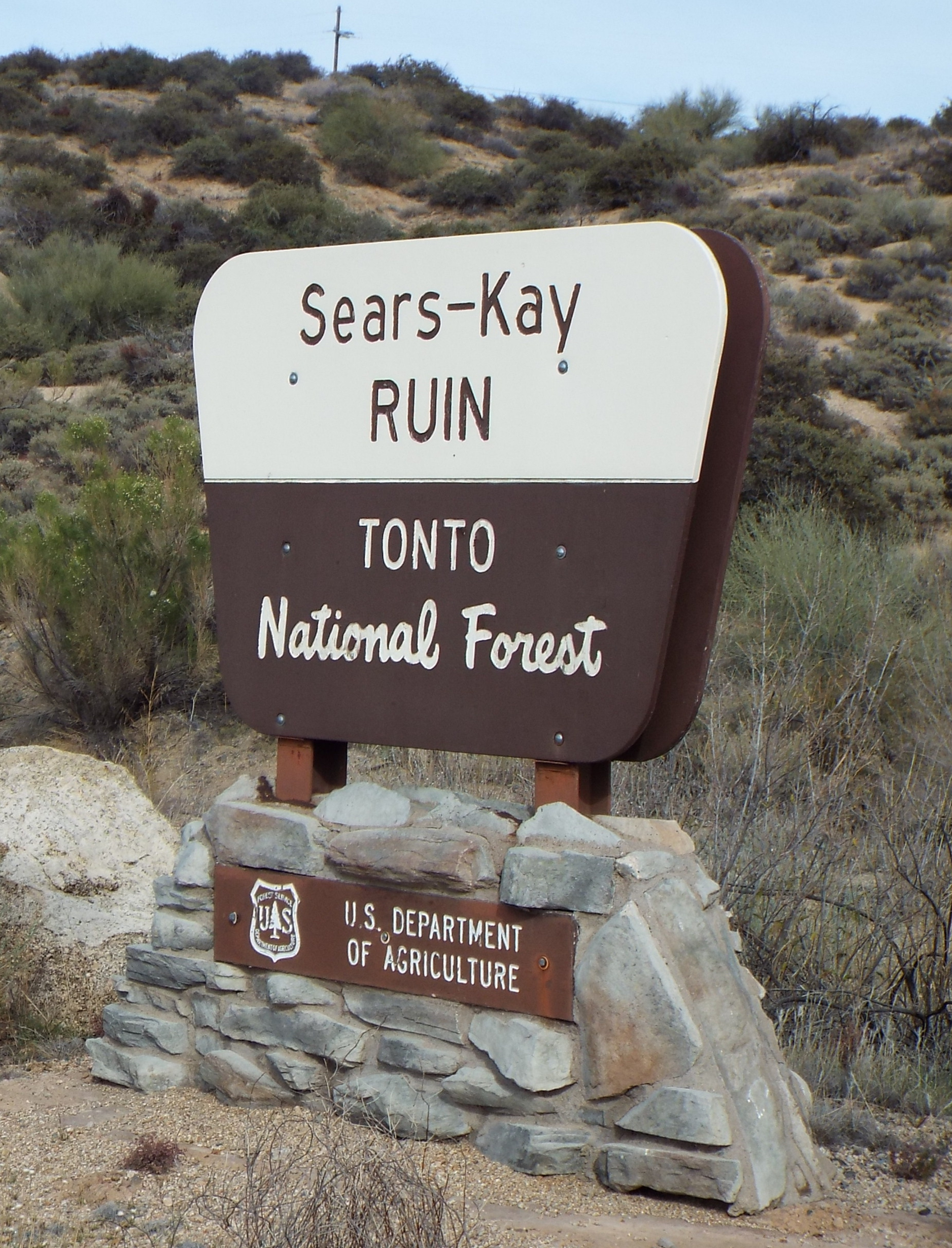
- Marker at the entrance of the Sears-Kay Ruin
- Location: North Sears Kay Ruins Road, Tonto National Forest, Carefree, Arizona
- Coordinates: 33°53′22″N 111°48′54″W
- Built: c. 1050 AD
- NRHP reference No.: 95001310
- Added to NRHP: November 24, 1995

The Sears-Kay Ruin are the remains of what once was a fortification of the Hohokam culture. The ruins are located in the area of the Tonto National Forest just outside of the town of Carefree, Arizona. On November 24, 1995, it was listed in the National Register of Historic Places.

== Brief history ==
The desert foothills in the area surrounding the town of Carefree, Arizona, were home to the Hohokam culture. The Hohokam may have been the ancestors of the modern Akimel O'odham and Tohono O'odham peoples in Southern Arizona.

The prehistoric Hohokam built villages and defensive fortifications. The Sears-Kay Ruin is one of the many forts built by the Hohokam. The ruins of this fort is located atop a desert foothill in the Tonto National Forest on the outskirts of the town of Carefree. The fort was built around 1050 AD and abandoned around 1200 AD. The reason for which the Hohokam abandoned the area is unknown. Eventually, members of the Tonto Apache tribe claimed the land.

In 1867, the fort was discovered by soldiers, of the 5th Cavalry Regiment from nearby Fort McDowell, who were on patrol. The Hohokam fort was named Sears-Kay Ruin because it was discovered on the lands where the Sears-Kay Ranch, founded by J.M. Sears in 1887, was located.

The fort had 40 rooms which housed about 100 people. One of the rooms is known as the "Mystery Room" because it is the only room among the 40 which does not have square corners. The corners of the "Mystery Room" are rounded and therefore archaeologists have speculated that this particular room was built in an earlier period. The site was listed in the National Register of Historic Places on November 24, 1995, reference #95001310.

== Hiking ==
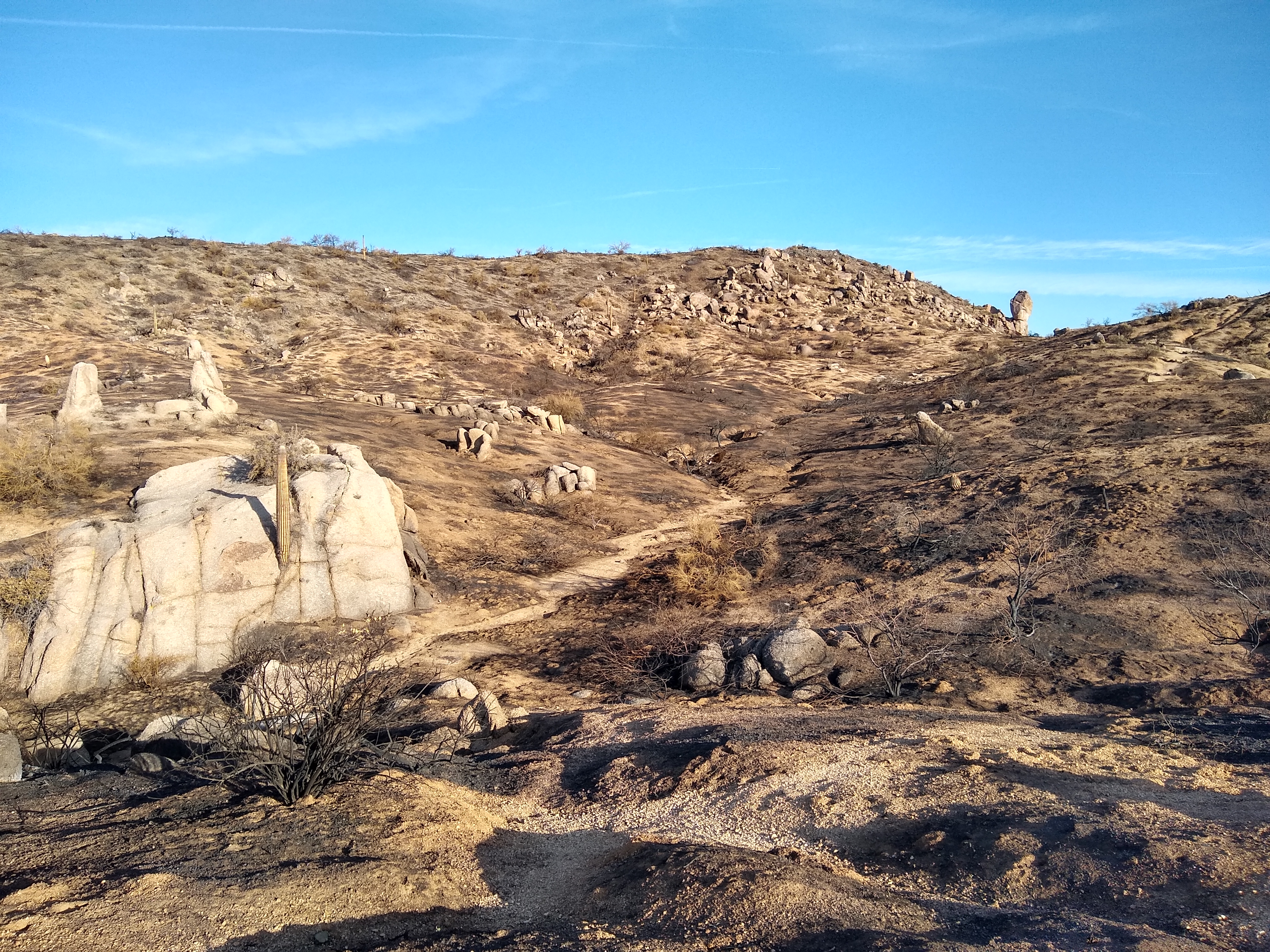
In September 2020, a wildfire destroyed most of the vegetation at and around the site, making it less attractive for hiking.

Hiking on the foothill where the fort is located is allowed. At the base of the hill there is a sign titled: "Walk in the Path of Ancient Hohokam at Sears-Kay Ruin" which details the path of the ancient Hohokam at Sears-Kay Ruin. There are various signs along the trail which describe each ruin. The area, including the artifacts located on the site, are protected under the Antiquities Act of 1906. The act is a bill (16 USC 431–433) passed by the United States Congress and signed into law by President Theodore Roosevelt on June 8, 1906, which strictly forbids the removal of artifacts from Indian Mesa.

According to the law "Any person who shall appropriate, excavate, injure, or destroy any historic or prehistoric ruin or monument, or any object of antiquity, situated on lands owned or controlled by the Government of the United States, without the permission of the Secretary of the Department of the Government having jurisdiction over the lands on which said antiquities are situated, shall, upon conviction, be fined or be imprisoned for a period of not more than ninety days, or shall suffer both fine and imprisonment, in the discretion of the court."

In September 2020, a wildfire destroyed most of the vegetation at and around the site, making it less attractive for hiking.

== Images of Sears-Kay Ruin ==
Sears-Kay Ruin

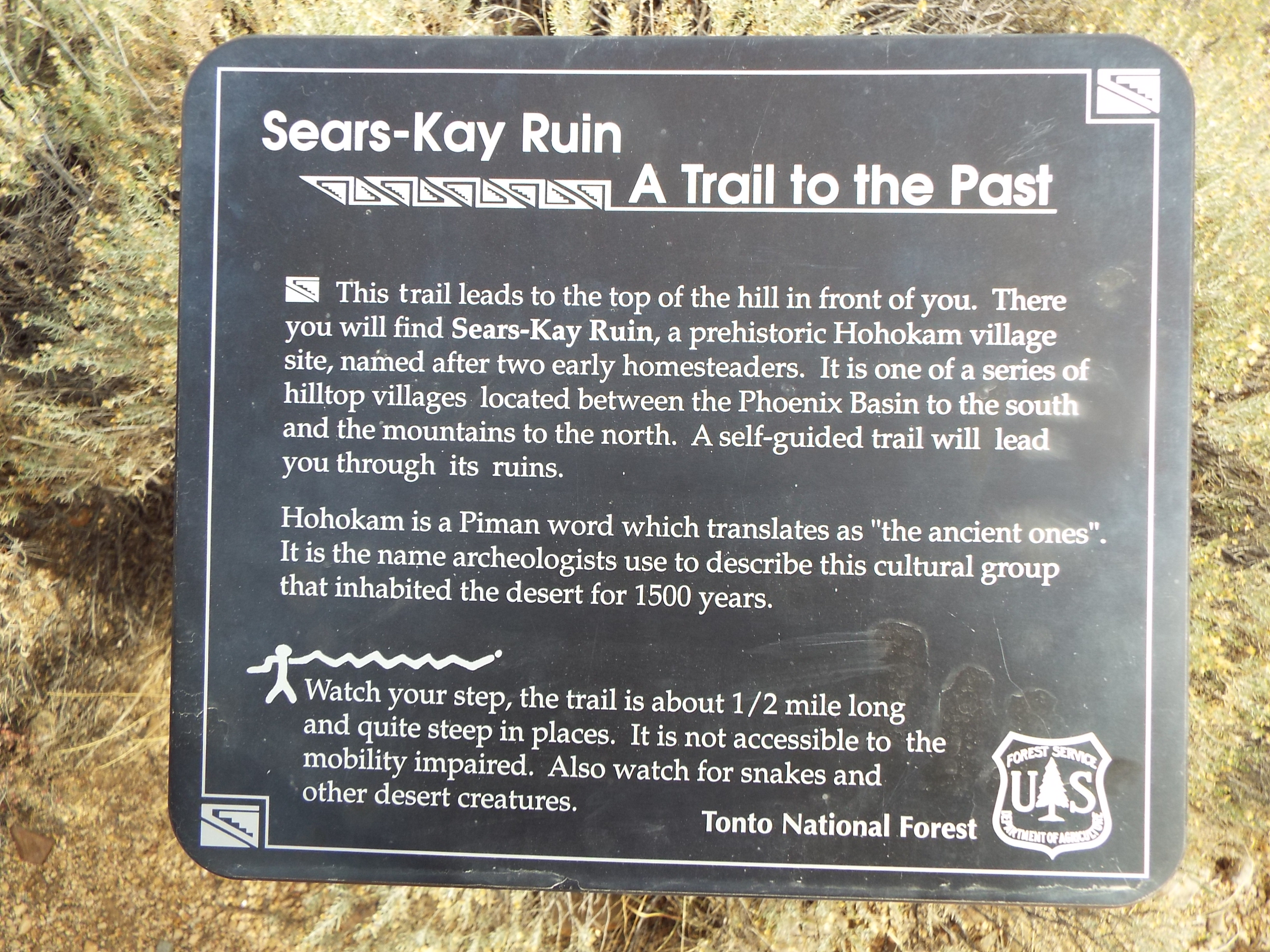
Sears-Kay Ruin "A trail to the past" marker.

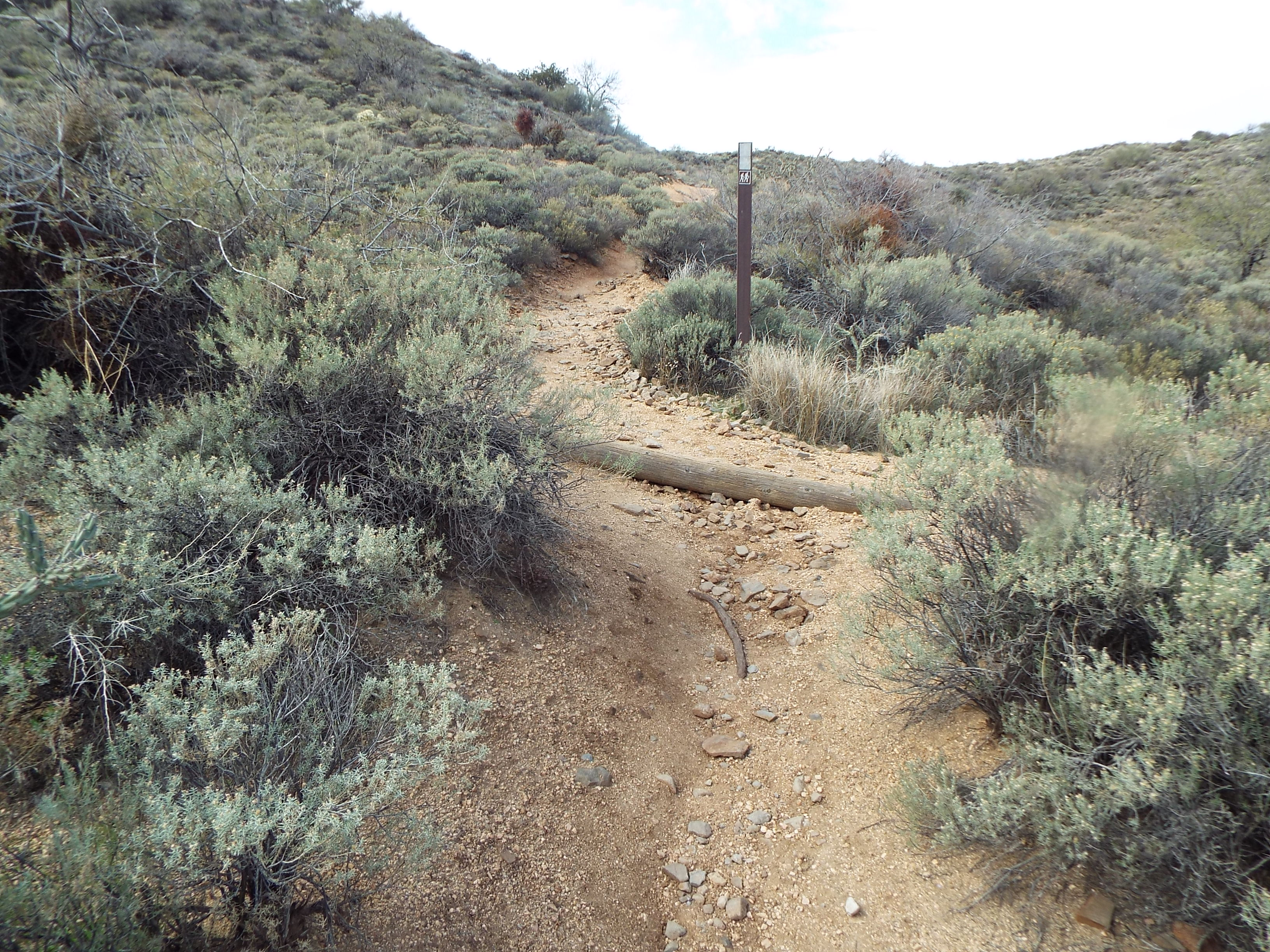
The starting point of "A Trail to the Past".

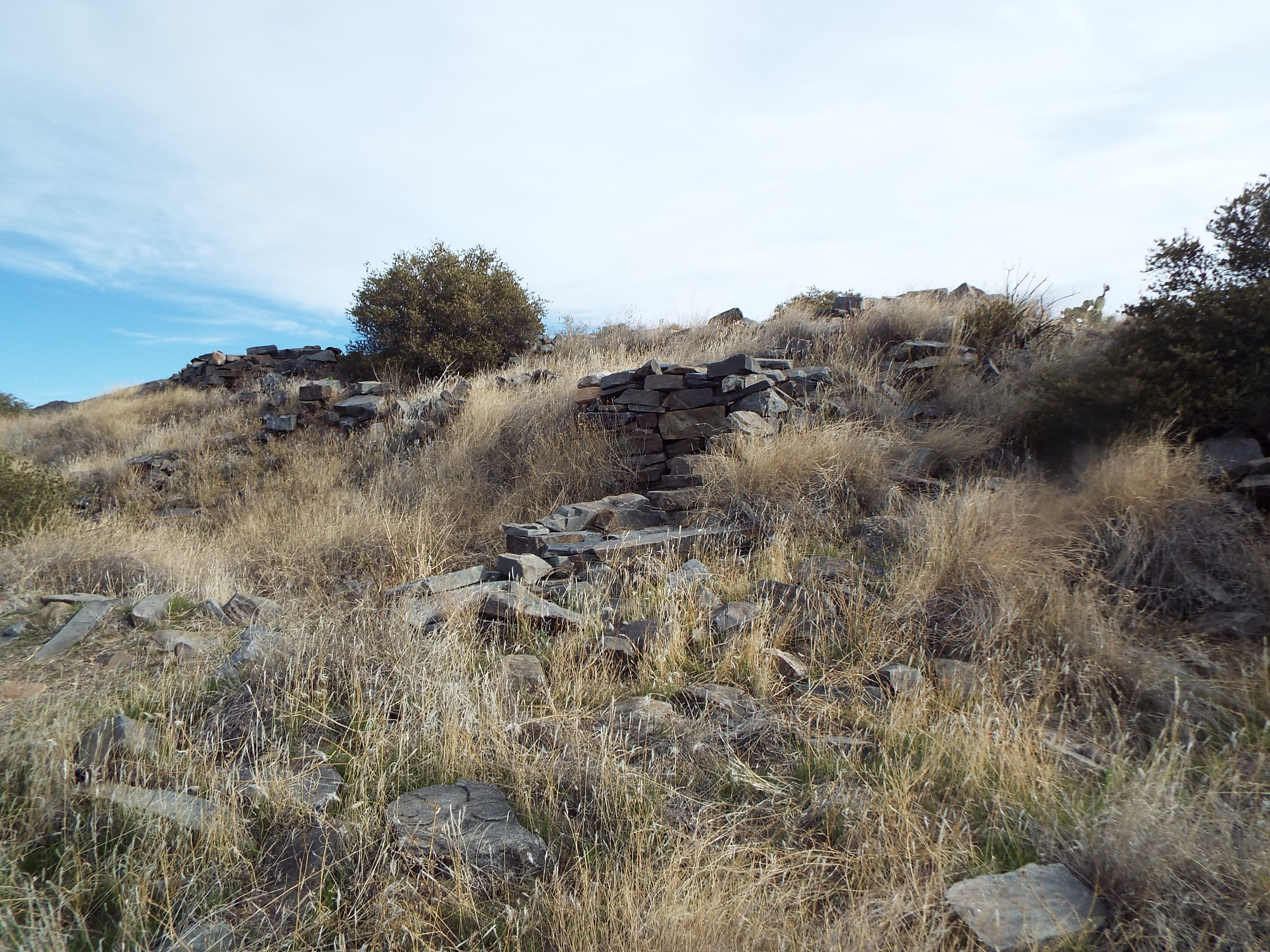
Sears-Kay Ruin Fort Ruins.

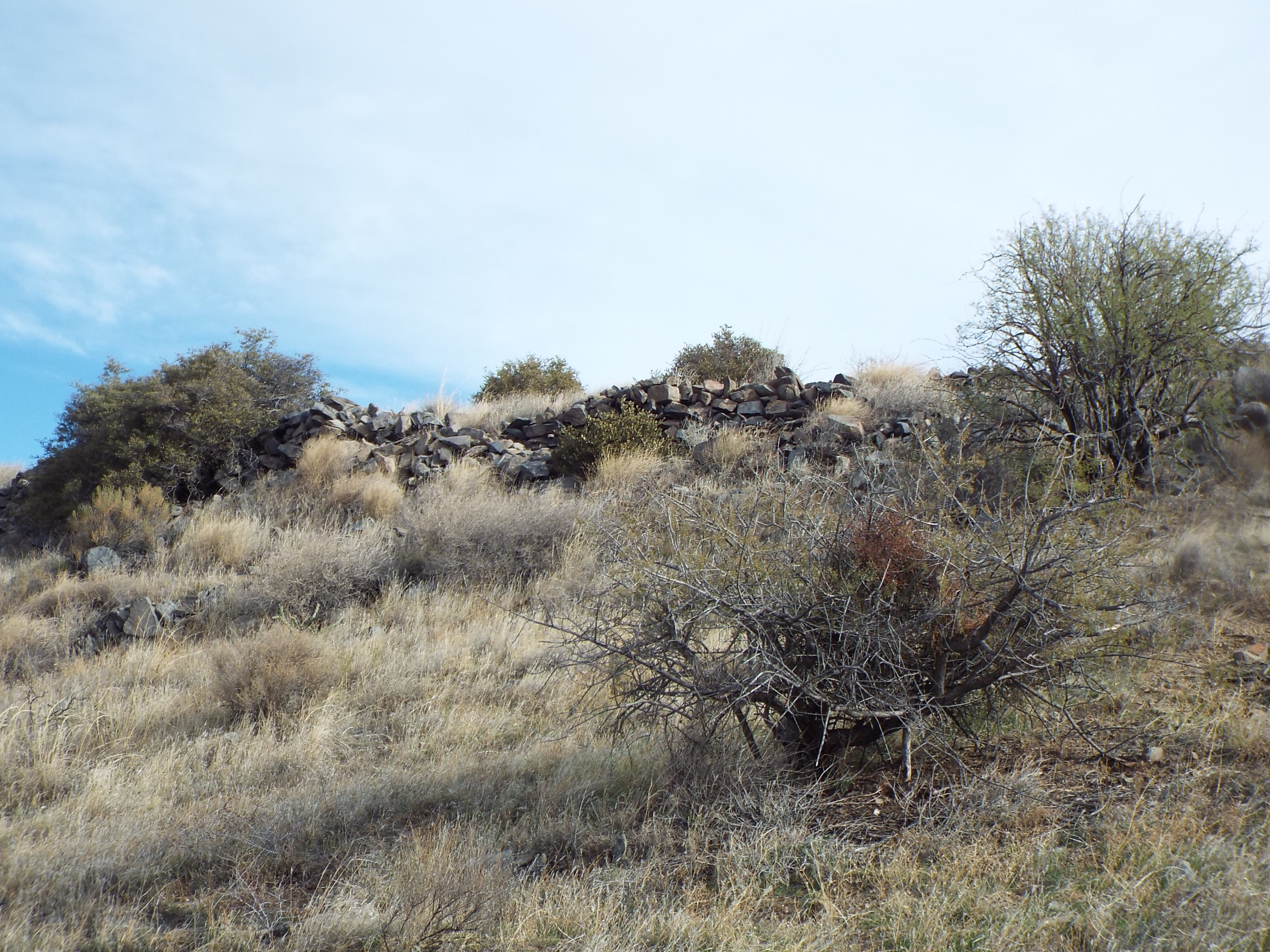
Sears-Kay Ruin Fort wall.

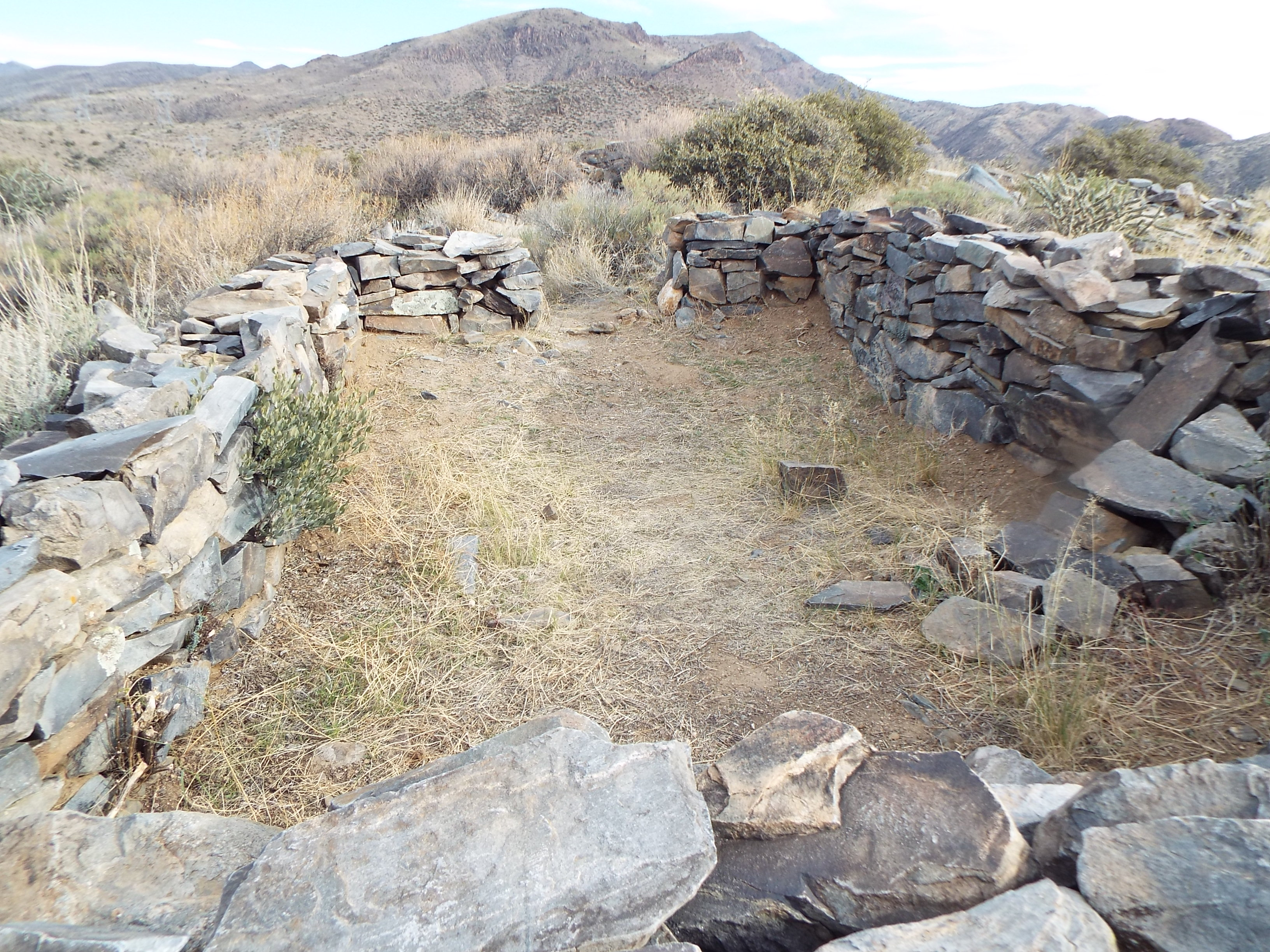
Sears-Kay Ruin Fort rooms.

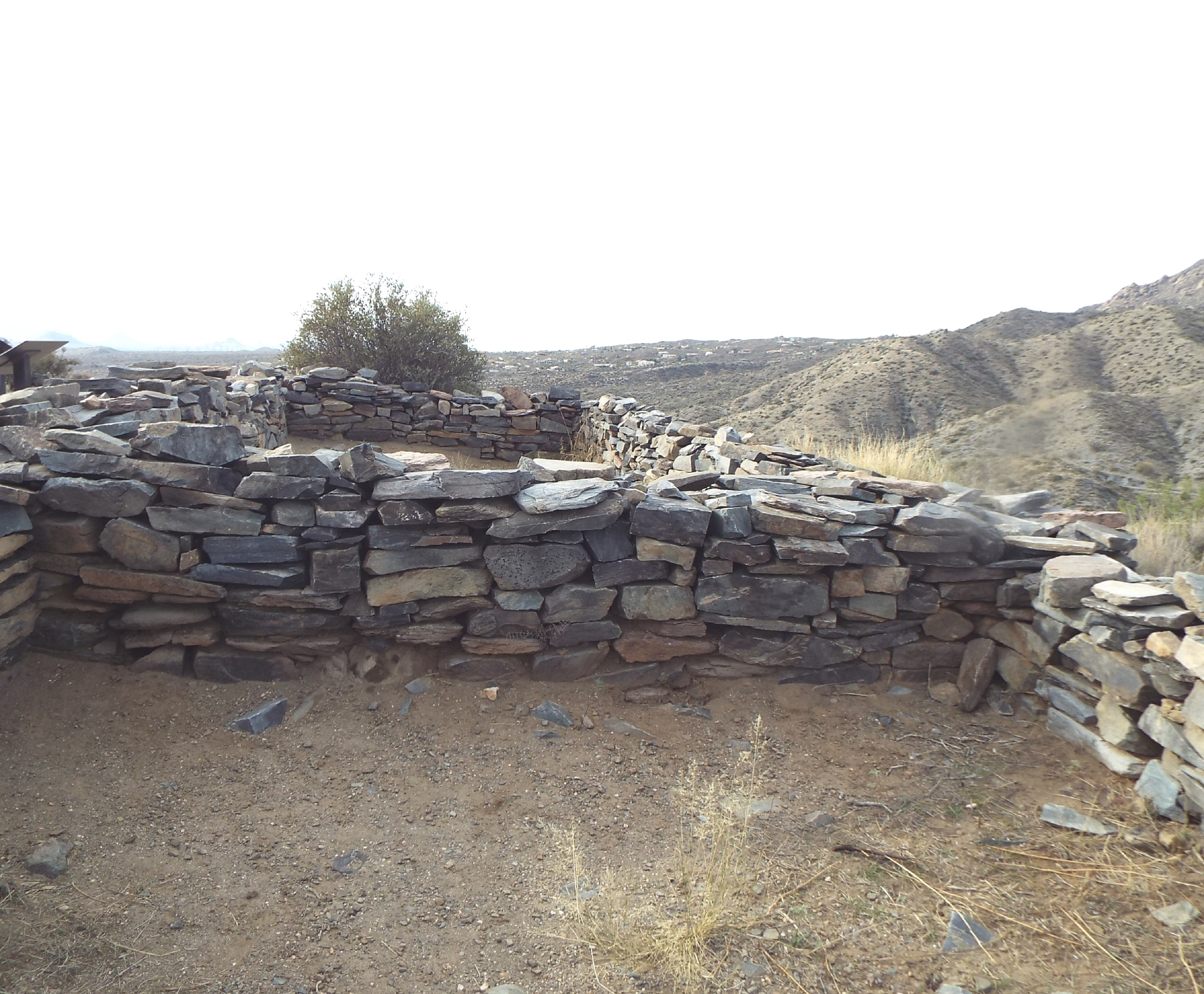
Sears-Kay Ruin Fort room.

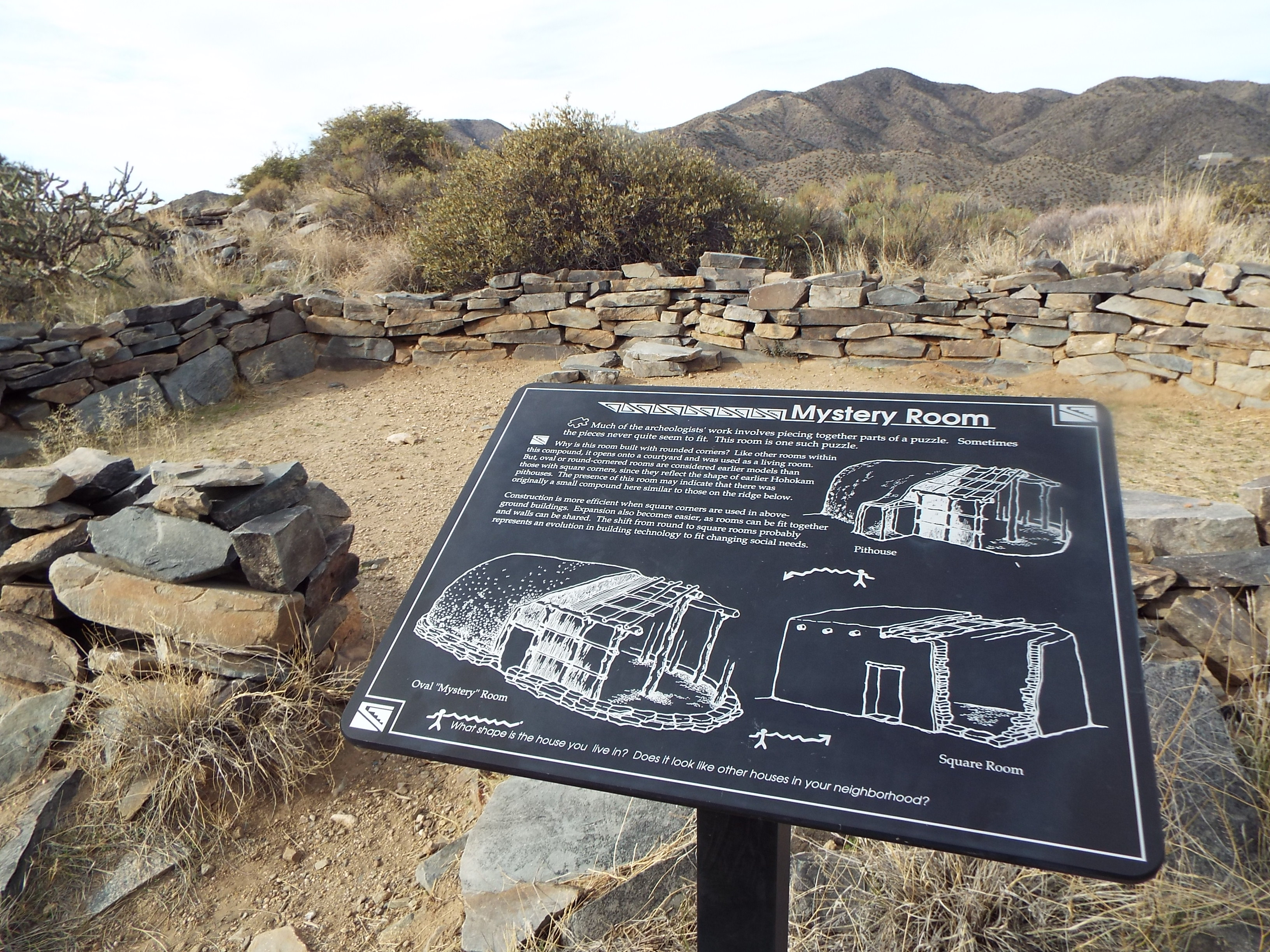
Sears-Kay Ruin Mystery Room Marker

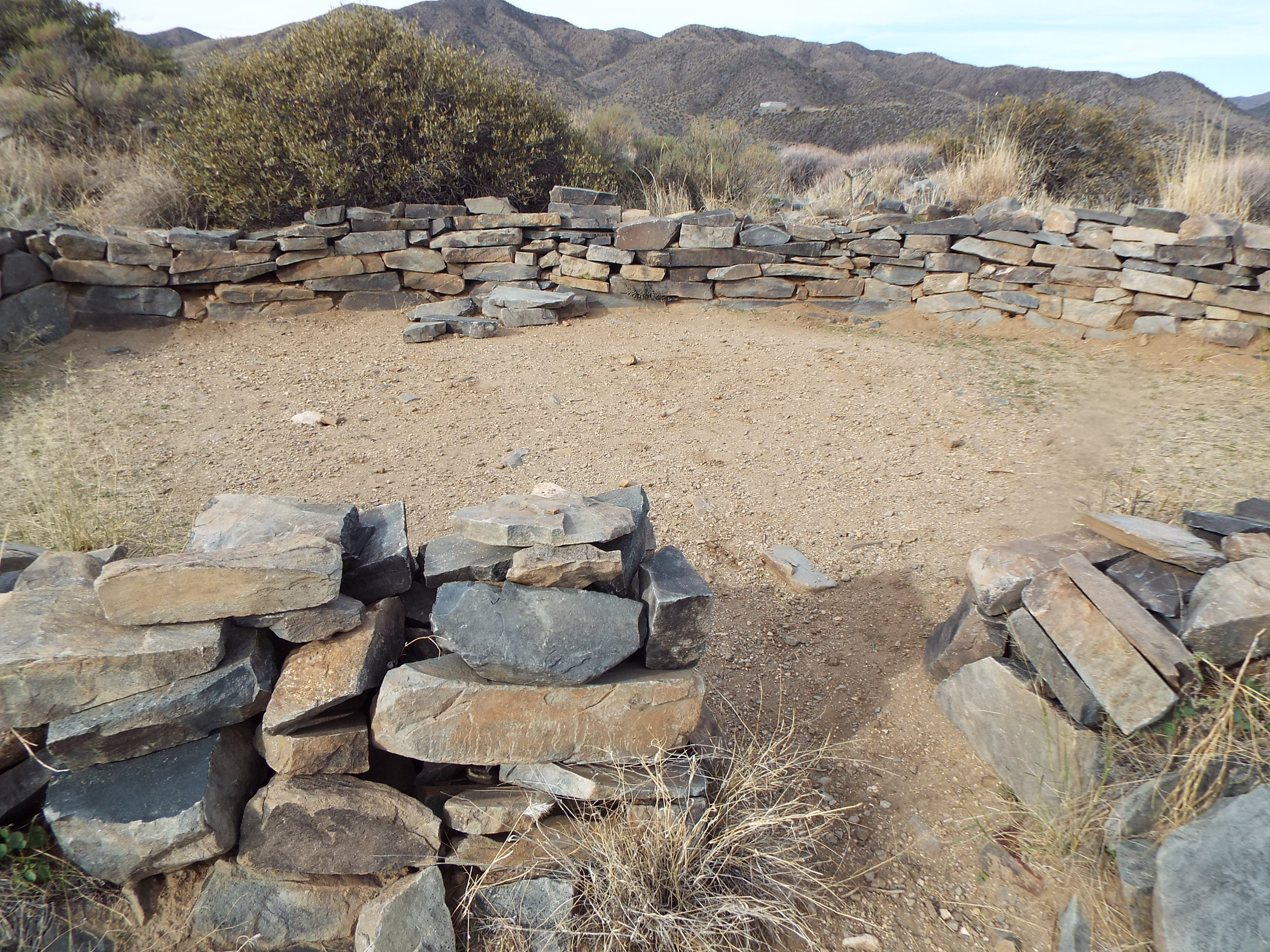
Sears-Kay Ruin Fort Mystery Room. This room had rounded corners.

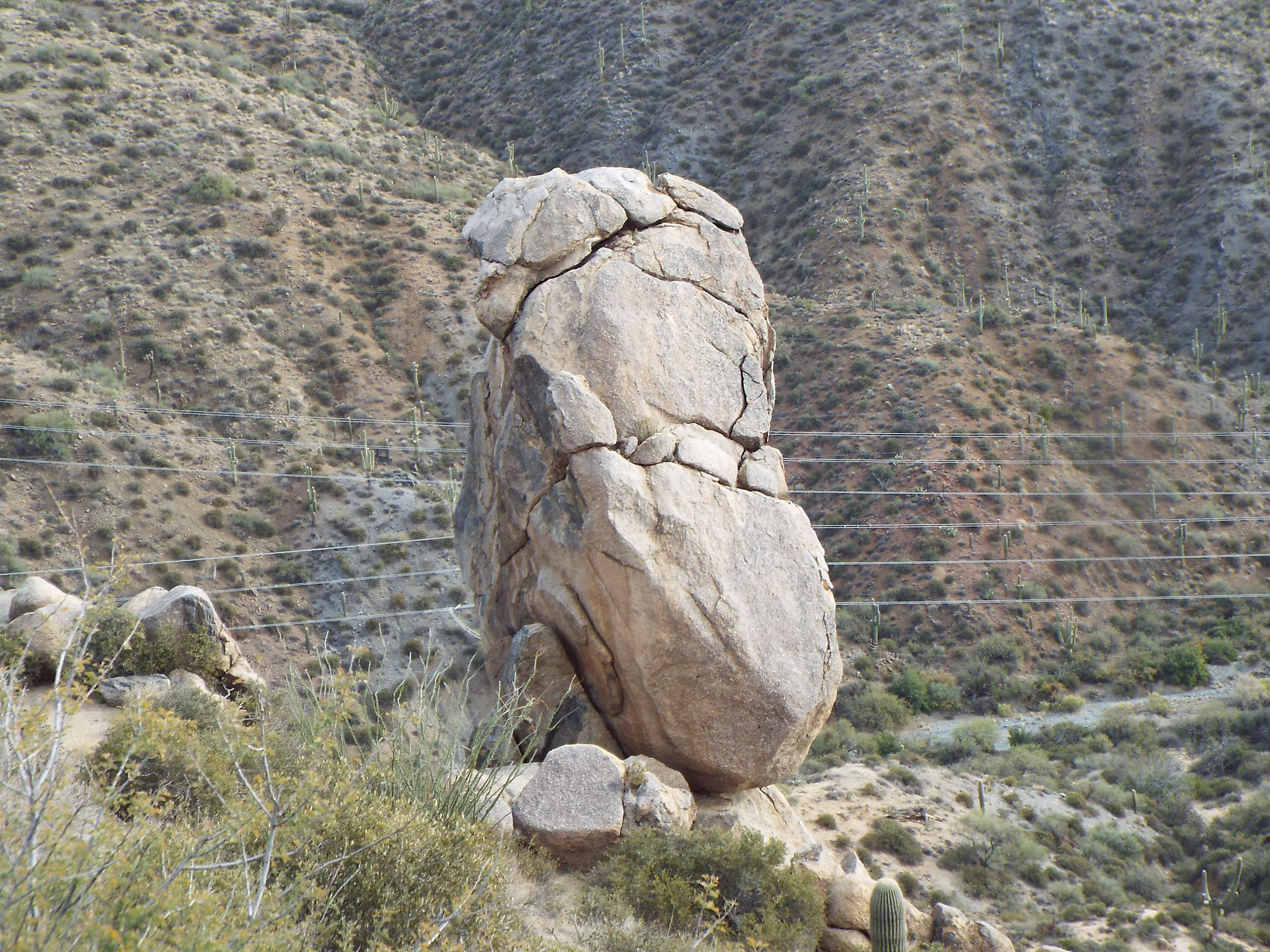
Sears-Kay Ruin Fort "Rock Jug" formation.

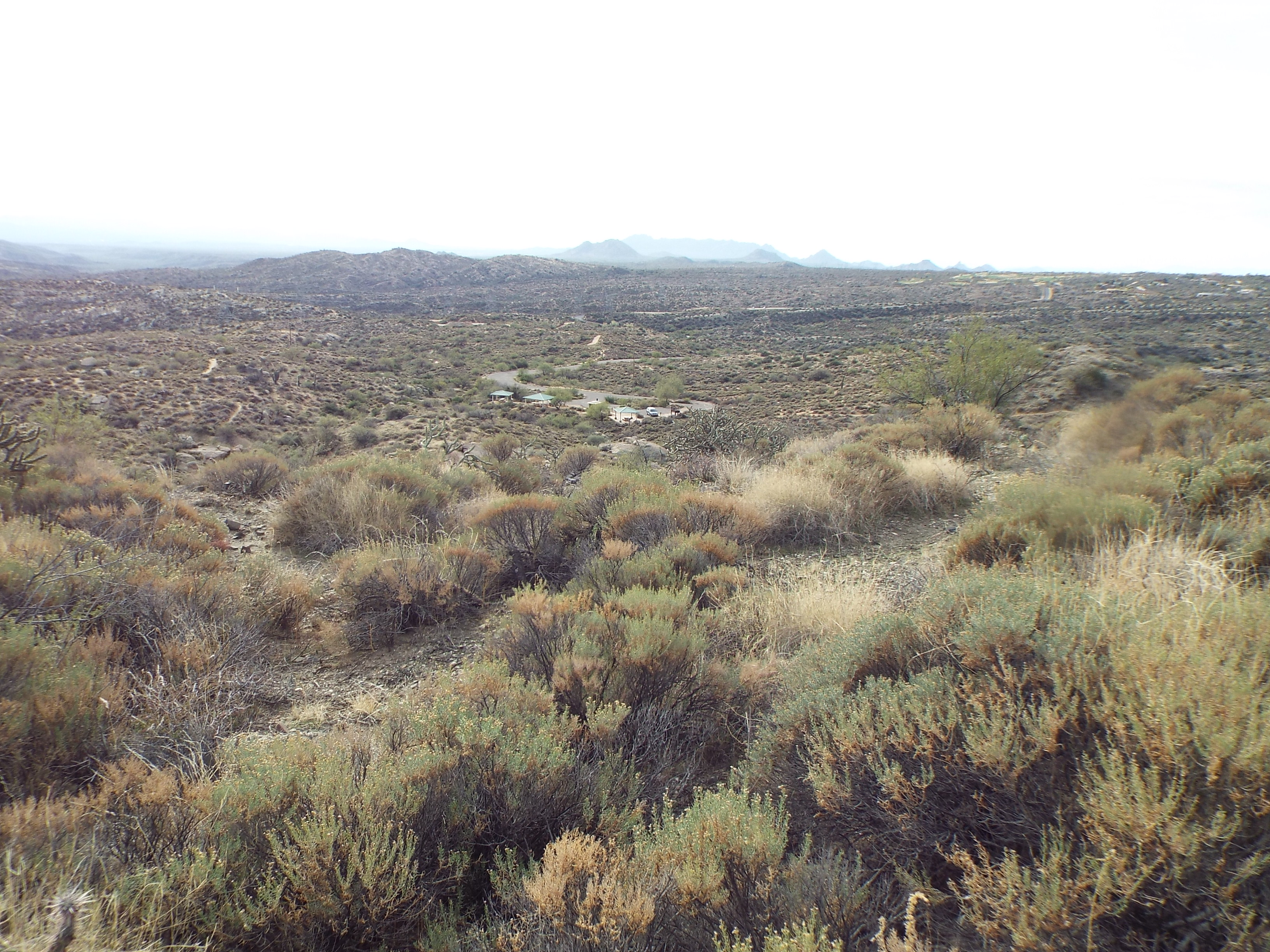
View from the top of the desert foothill where the Sears-Kay Ruin Fort is located.

== See also ==
- Indian Mesa
- Montezuma Castle National Monument
- Montezuma Well
- Casa Grande Ruins National Monument
