= Hohokam =

Prehistoric culture in the North American Southwest

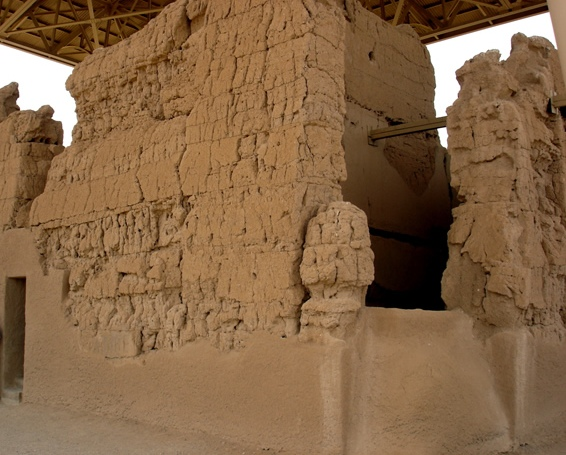
The Great House at the Casa Grande Ruins National Monument

Hohokam was a culture in the North American Southwest in part of south-central Arizona, United States, and Sonora, Mexico. It existed between 300 and 1500 CE, with cultural precursors possibly as early as 300 BCE. Archaeologists disagree about whether communities that practiced the culture were related or politically united. According to local oral tradition, Hohokam societies may be the ancestors of the historic Akimel and Tohono Oʼodham in Southern Arizona.

The origin of the culture is uncertain. Most archaeologists think it emerged locally or in Mesoamerica, but it was also influenced by the Northern Pueblo culture. Hohokam settlements were located on trade routes that extended past the Hohokam area, as far east as the Great Plains and west to the Pacific coast. Hohokam societies received a remarkable amount of immigration. Some communities established significant markets, such as that in Snaketown. The harshness of the Sonoran Desert may have been the most influential factor on the society. Despite cultural exchange at trade centers, self-sufficiency and local resources were emphasized.

In modern Phoenix, the Hohokam are recognized for their large-scale irrigation networks. Their canal network in the Phoenix metropolitan area was the most complex in the pre-contact Western Hemisphere. A portion of the ancient canals has been renovated for the Salt River Project and helps to supply the city's water. The original canals were dirt ditches and required routine maintenance; those still in use are lined with concrete. When Hohokam society collapsed, the dirt canals fell into disrepair. European-American settlers later infilled some canals, while others renovated, as with the Mormon pioneers settling the Lehi area of Mesa near Red Mountain.

According to the National Park Service, the word Hohokam is borrowed from the O'odham language, and is used by archaeologists to identify groups of people who lived in the Sonoran Desert. Other archaeologists prefer to identify ancient Arizona as part of the Oasisamerica tradition and instead call Hohokam the Oasisamericans. Nevertheless, Hohokam are one of the four major cultures of the American Southwest and Northern Mexico, according to Southwestern archaeology.

There are several official spelling variants for the name, including Hobokam, Huhugam, and Huhukam. The spellings are commonly thought to be interchangeable, but they have different meanings. In the 1930s, archaeologist Harold S. Gladwin differentiated Hohokam culture from others in the region. He applied the existing O'odham term for the culture, huhu-kam, in its common mistranslation as "all used up" or "those who are gone", to classify the remains that he was excavating in the Lower Gila Valley. Similarly, in the 1970s, archaeologist Hardy translated the O'odham word huhugam to mean "that which has perished." However, huhugam refers to past human life and not to objects such as ruins. Therefore, the archaeological term Hohokam should not be confused with huhugam, the reverence of ancestors and descendants.

== Overview ==
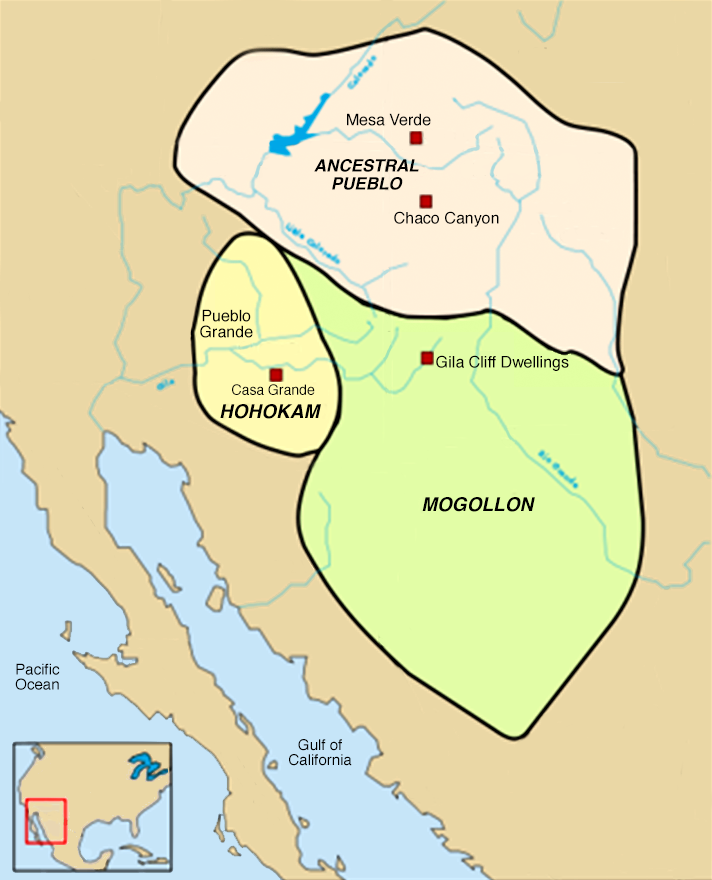
Map of Hohokam and neighboring cultures in circa 1350

Hohokam society is primarily associated with the Gila and lower Salt River drainages in the Phoenix basin.

The Phoenix Basin was the Hohokam Core Area, and the Hohokam Periphery were adjacent areas where the Hohokam culture extended. Collectively, the Core and Peripheries formed the greater Hohokam Regional System, which occupied the northern or Upper Sonoran Desert in Arizona. The Hohokam also extended into the Mogollon Rim.

The Hohokam Core was located along rivers, and as such inhabited a prime trade position. Trade occurred between the Patayan, who were situated along the Lower Colorado River and in southern California; the Trincheras of Sonora, Mexico; the Mogollon culture in Eastern Arizona; Southwest New Mexico; Northwest Chihuahua, Mexico; and the Ancestral Puebloans in Northern Arizona. From 900 to 1150 CE, neighboring Chaco society encouraged trade throughout northern Arizona and into southwest Colorado and southern Utah. These trade networks increased hand-to-hand trade throughout the region, with goods traveling throughout the Colorado Plateau, northern Arizona, and the Phoenix area.

Hohokam irrigation systems supported the largest population in the Southwest by 1300 CE. Archaeologists working at a major archaeological dig in the 1990s in the Tucson Basin, along the Santa Cruz River, identified a culture and people that may have been the ancestors of the Hohokam. This prehistoric group may have occupied southern Arizona as early as 2000 BCE, and in the Early Agricultural Period grew corn, lived year-round in sedentary villages, and developed sophisticated irrigation canals.

The Hohokam used the waters of the Salt and Gila Rivers to build an assortment of simple canals with weirs for agriculture. From 800 to 1400 CE, their irrigation networks rivaled the complexity of those of ancient Near East, Egypt, and China. They were constructed using relatively simple tools and engineering technology, yet achieved drops of a few feet per mile, balancing erosion and siltation. The Hohokam cultivated varieties of cotton, tobacco, maize, beans, and squash, and harvested a vast variety of wild plants. Late in the Hohokam Chronological Sequence, they also used extensive dry-farming systems, mainly to grow agave for food and fiber. Their agricultural strategies were vital in the inhospitable desert, and allowed the aggregation of rural populations into complex urban centers.

Many features of earlier Hohokam domestic architecture, such as rectangular pithouses, were apparently transplanted relatively intact from the Tucson basin during the early Formative Period. Throughout the Hohokam Chronological Sequence, individual homes were usually excavated approximately 40 cm (16 in) below ground level, had plastered or compacted floors of 12 to 35 m^{2}, and had a bowl-shaped, clay-lined hearth near the wall-entry. By 600 CE, a distinct Hohokam architectural tradition emerged that had similarities with Mesoamerica, such as ballcourts that also served as neighborhood gathering and trade spaces and possibly specific ceremonial events based on their directional orientation. Unlike the stone courts seen in Mesoamerica, these were usually dug into the soil sometimes up to 9 feet deep. The soil would then be piled up on either side and could get up to 250 feet in length and 90 feet in width. By 1150 CE, pithouses were replaced by above-ground structures in the compound style with central courtyards. By 1200 CE, rectangular platforms mounds were being constructed.

Hohokam burial practices varied over time, but cremation was a defining cultural characteristic of the Hohokam Core. Cremation has been used by archaeologists to suggest cultural interaction through trade or immigration with neighboring communities. An example is the Mogollan, at the Continental site in Tucson. Initially, the main method was flexed inhumation, similar to the southern Mogollon culture neighboring to the east. By the late Formative and Preclassic periods, the Hohokam cremated their dead, very similar to the traditions documented among the historic Patayan culture to the west along the Lower Colorado River. Although the particulars of the practice changed somewhat, cremation remained the main practice in Hohokam until around 1300 CE.

== History ==
Hohokam chronological sequence (HCS) is an archaeological construct that divides Hohokam history into phases of significant cultural changes. It uses two main methods of expression: Gladwinian and Cultural Horizon. The latter is an adaptation of the chronological scheme used in Mesoamerica applied to avoid the interpretive bias inherent in the Gladwinian scheme (i.e. Pioneer, Colonial, Sedentary periods).

The HCS and the methods to establish its calendrical reference are applied only to the Hohokam Core Area, which is the Gila-Salt River basin associated with Phoenix, Arizona, not to regions outside that area, called Hohokam Peripheries. Within these regions, the basic period designations are retained; however, local phases are often used to note significant differences, and, to some extent, represents communities influenced by their Ancestral Puebloan and Mogollon neighbors.

=== Pioneer/Formative period (1–750 CE) ===
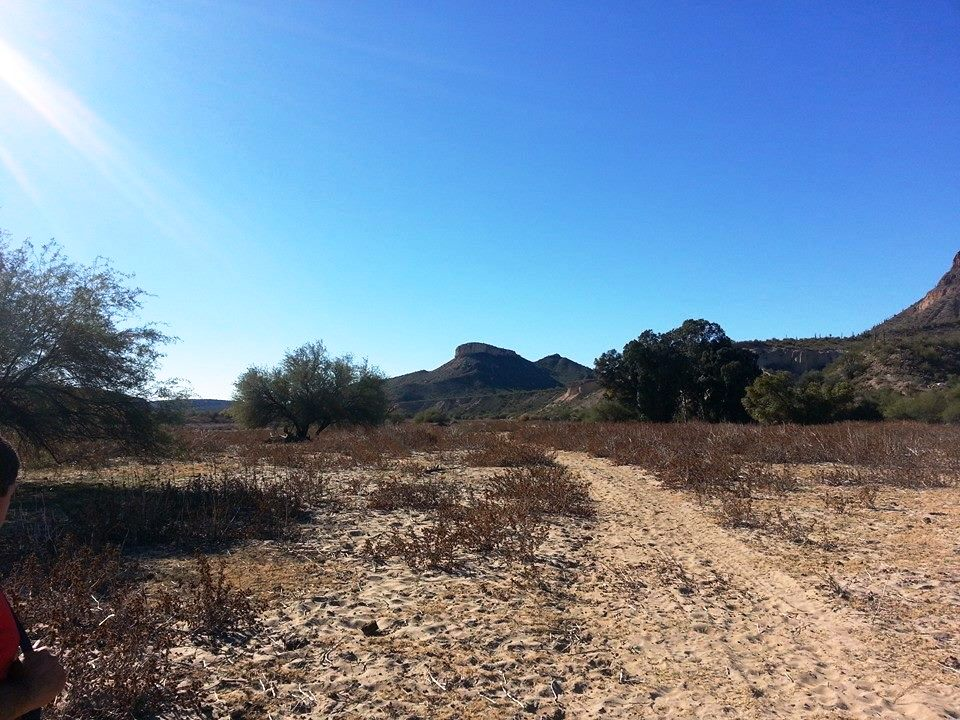
Hiking trail leading to Indian Mesa (in the background): The hiking trail is located on a portion of a canal which the Hohokam built in 700 CE. The canal is now filled with soil.

As farmers of corn and beans, early Hohokam founded a series of small villages along the middle Gila River. The communities were located near arable land, and dry farming was common early in this period. Water wells, usually less than 10 feet (3 m) deep, were dug for domestic water supplies. Early Hohokam homes were built of branches that were bent, covered with twigs or reeds and heavily applied mud, and other available materials.

Crop, agricultural skill, and cultural refinements increased between 300 and 500 CE as the Hohokam acquired a new group of cultivated plants, presumably from trade with peoples in the area of modern Mexico. These acquisitions included cotton, tepary bean, sieva and jack beans, cushaw and warty squash, and southwestern pigweed. Agave species had been gathered for food and fiber for thousands of years by southwestern peoples, and around 600, the Hohokam began cultivating agave, particularly Agave murpheyi ("Hohokam agave"), on large areas of rocky, dry ground. Agave became a major food source for the Hohokam to augment the food grown in irrigated areas. Engineering improved access to river water and the inhabitants excavated canals for irrigation. Evidence of trade networks include turquoise, shells from the Gulf of California, and parrot bones from central Mexico. Seeds and grains were prepared on stone manos and metates. Ceramics appeared shortly before 300 CE, with pots of unembellished brown used for storage and cooking, and as containers for cremated remains. Materials produced for ritual use included fired clay human and animal figures and incense burners.

=== Colonial/Preclassic period (750–1050/1150) ===
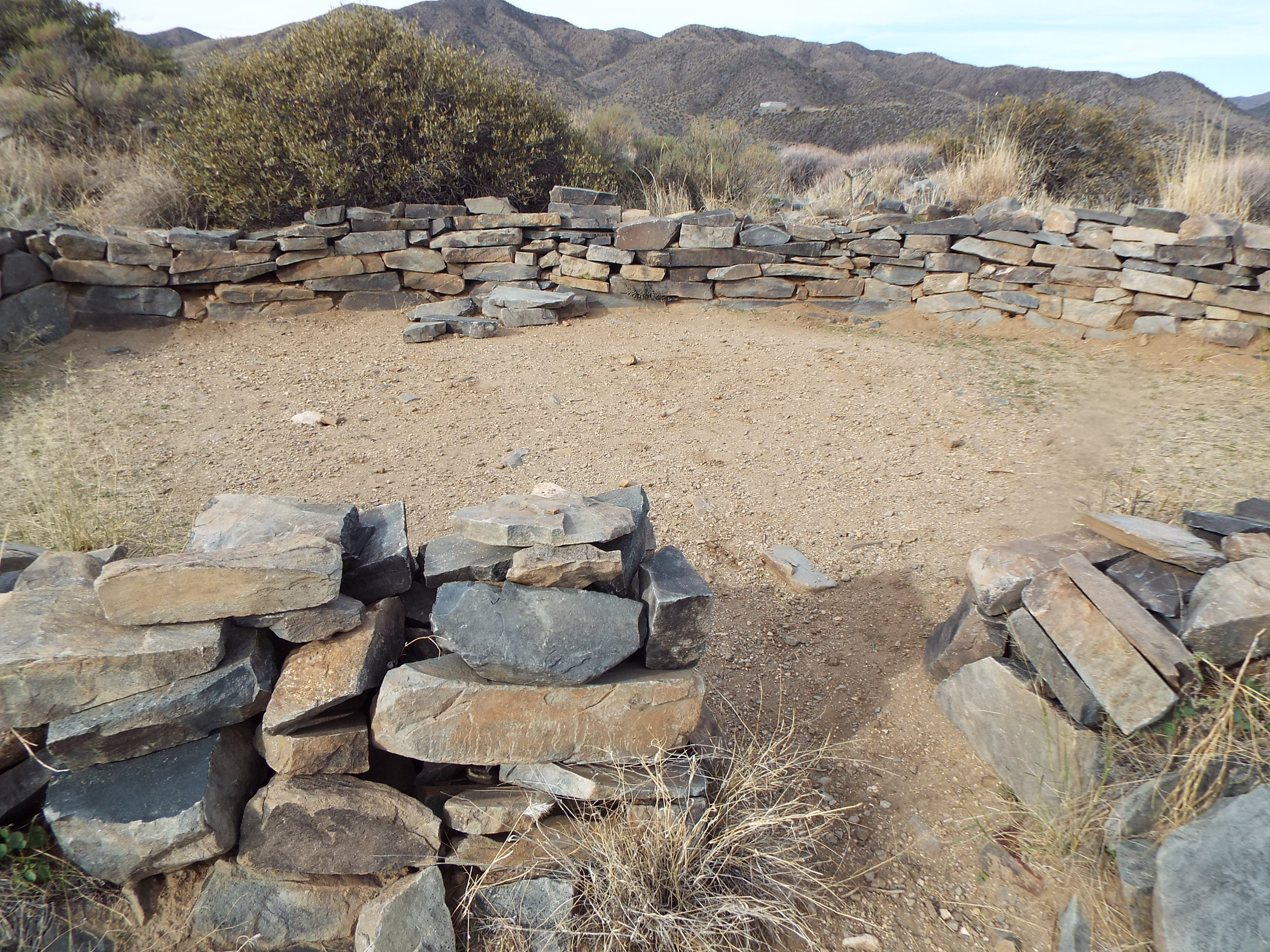
Sears-Kay Ruin Fort Mystery Room before circa 1050 CE: This room had rounded corners.

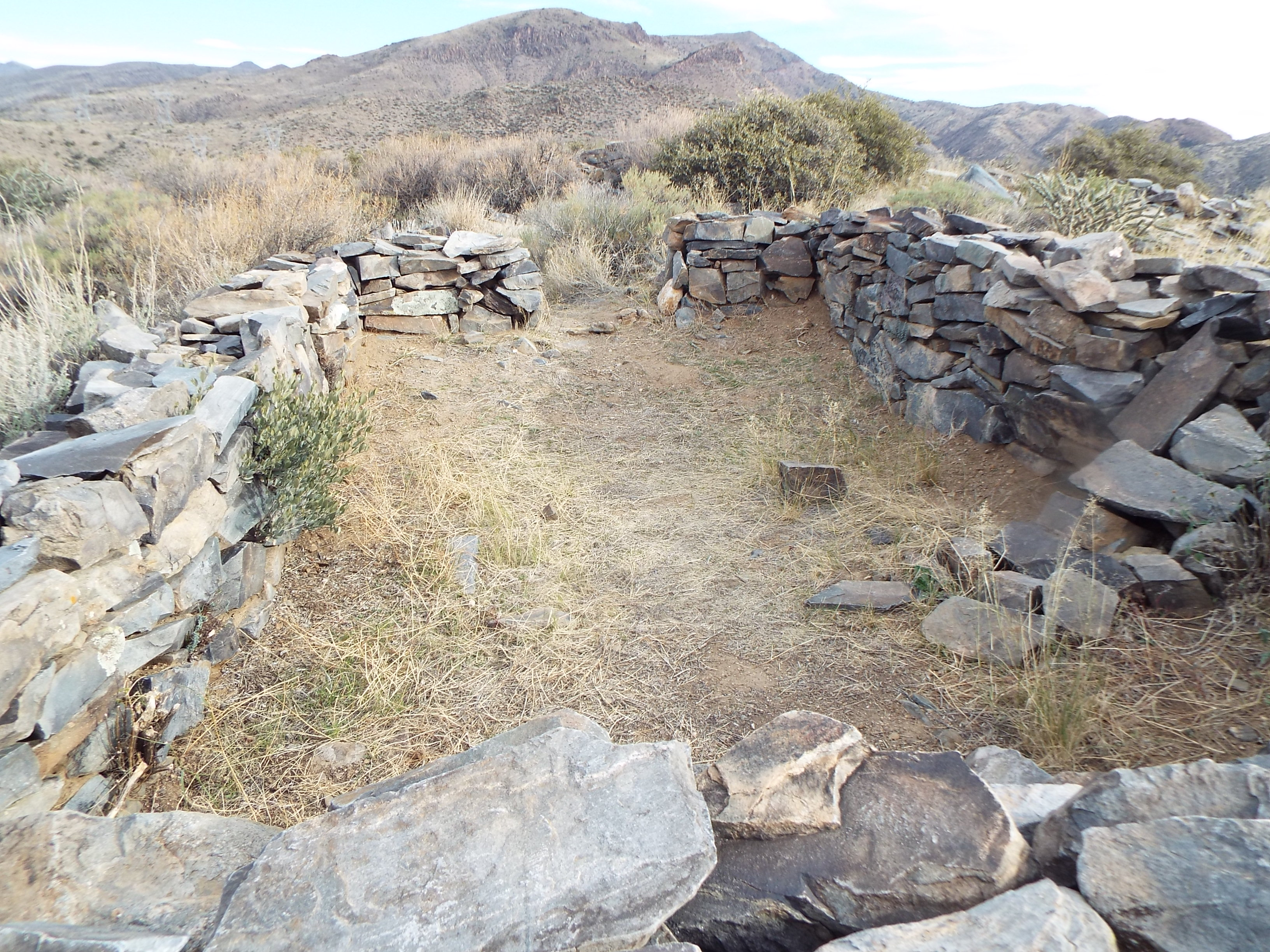
Sears-Kay Ruin Fort rooms with square corners, circa 1050 CE

Growth is the major characteristic of the Colonial period. Villages grew larger, with clusters of houses opening on a common courtyard. Some evidence exists of social stratification in larger homes and more ornate grave goods. Area and canal systems expanded, and tobacco and agave production began. Mexican influence increased. In larger communities, the first Hohokam ball courts were constructed and served as focal points for games and ceremonies. Pottery was embellished by the addition of an iron-stained slip, which produced a distinctive red-on-buff ware.

==== Sedentary period/Sacaton phase (950–1050/1150) ====
Further population increase brought significant changes. Irrigation canals and structures became larger and required more maintenance. More land came under cultivation, and Southwestern pigweed was grown. House design evolved into post-reinforced pit-houses, covered with caliche adobe. Rancheria-like villages grew up around common courtyards, with evidence of increased communal activity. Large common ovens were used to cook bread and meat.

Crafts were greatly refined. By about 1000 CE, the Hohokam were the first to master acid etching, daubing shells with pitch and bathing them in acid most likely made out of fermented cactus juice. Artisans produced jewelry from shell, stone, and bone, and began to carve stone figures. Cotton textile work flourished. Red-on-buff pottery was widely produced.

This growth brought a need for increased organization, and perhaps authority. The regional culture spread widely, extending from near the Mexican border to the Verde River in the north. There appears to have been an elite class, as well as an increase in social status for craftsman. Platform mounds similar to those in central Mexico appear, and may be associated with an upper class and have some religious function. Trade items from the Mexican heartland included copper bells, mosaics, stone mirrors, and ornate birds such as macaws.

=== Classic period (1050/1150–1450 CE) ===
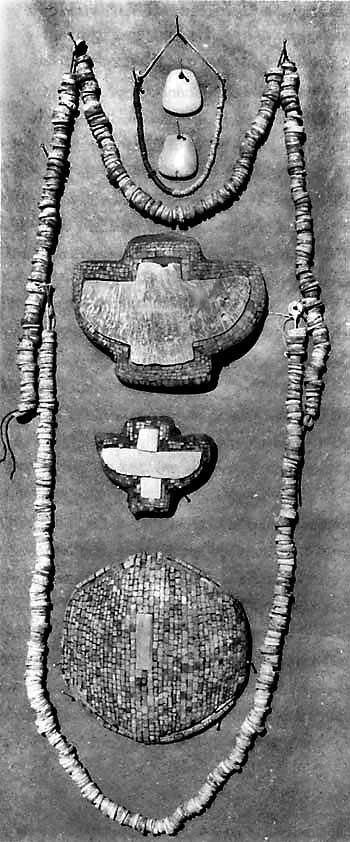
Hohokam turquoise mosaic jewelry

This period is generally considered as a time of growth and social change. The community of Snaketown, once central to the culture, was suddenly abandoned. Parts of this large village seem to have burned, and it was never reoccupied. This period also saw the construction of large and prestigious structures in the Salt-Gila Basin. These included large, rectangular, adobe-walled compounds with platform mounds and great houses, such as the example found at the Casa Grande Ruins National Monument. Additionally, evidence of Hohokam influence in a broader context decreased significantly.

==== Santan phase (1050–1150 CE) ====
This phase was initially proposed as part of the Gladwinian scheme, but recently has fallen out of favor with many Hohokam archaeologists. The primary reason for this view is that the Hohokam buff ware type once classified as Santan red-on-buff is now listed as either a late form of Sacaton or Casa Grande red-on-buffs. The wide range of vessel forms used for decorated pottery was discarded for globular jars with necks. Production and use of Hohokam buff wares decrease significantly. So did the procurement and trade of raw shell from northern Mexico and its manufacture into jewelry. There was a transition from pithouses to pitrooms and an introduction of spherical spindle whorls similar to examples used in northern Mexico. Conceptually, this episode had the relatively sudden and widespread abandonment or relocation of many Hohokam villages and a short-lived population decline. Vast internal changes, the rejection of the Hohokam ballcourt system, and the peripheries' displaying overt indications of belligerence towards the core area, followed by their cultural realignment, suggests that this was a very important episode.

==== Soho phase (1050/1150–1300 CE) ====
The diagnostic ceramic type for this phase was Casa Grande red-on-buff. This Hohokam buff ware was characterized exclusively by jars with necks, decorated with a limited variety of geometric and textual designs. This pottery type appears to have been manufactured at several locales in the Gila River basin between Florence and Sacaton, Arizona. There was a major cultural retraction of territory, and two significant episodes of reorganization. The first reorganization occurred around 1150 CE and was typified by a modest increase in population and near-universal adoption of pitroom architecture. These early pitrooms were built of perishable material covered with a thick adobe plaster, and the basal portion of the interior walls was often lined with upright slabs. Similar to the Preclassic period villages, these early Classic period homes were clustered around open courtyards. These courtyard groups were clustered near a large central locus, which often included small platform mounds. These platform mounds were rectangular, faced by post-reinforced adobe walls, and were filled with either sterile soil or refuse from Preclassic trash mounds. In the largest villages, the central locus included small platform mounds. The number of small and medium-sized settlements seem to have declined as the larger communities became increasingly more densely occupied.

==== Civano phase (1300–1350/1375 CE) ====
Although Casa Grande red-on-buff continued to be produced, the pottery type that characterized this phase was Salado polychrome, primarily Gila polychrome. This ceramic type was either manufactured locally or procured as a trade ware. This phase also had the introduction the comal, similar to examples found in northern Mexico, and the production of bird-shaped effigy vessels. Examples of exotic stone and shell artifacts associated with high-status individuals – such as nose plugs, pendants, ear rings, bracelets, necklaces, and sophisticated shell inlays – indicate that the design and manufacture of jewelry reached its zenith during this phase. Other important developments were the significant increased procurement and manufacture of red ware, and the near-universal use of inhumation burial in the area north of the Gila River, both similar to the practices and traditions used by the historic O'odham.

Immediately after 1300 CE, Hohokam villages were reorganized along the lines experienced in the Lower Verde, Tonto Basin, and Safford Basin, in the 13th century. These compounds were composed of a large, rectangular exterior wall that partially (sometimes completely) enclosed a series of adjacent courtyards and plazas separated by partition walls. In turn, each courtyard may have contained one to four large, rectangular, adobe-walled pitrooms, possibly associated with several utility structures. Overall, these communities were characterized by relatively compact clusters of 5 to 25 adobe-walled compounds, which tended to be grouped around a single very large and well-built compound that often had some form of large community structure, such as a platform mound or great house. Great house structures, as with the one preserved at Casa Grande Ruins National Monument, were built only at the largest communities. These stone or adobe buildings had up to four stories, and were probably used by the managerial or religious elites. They may have also been constructed to align with astronomical observations. Trade with Mexico appears to have declined, but an increased number of trade goods arrived from Pueblo peoples to the north and the east.

Between 1350 and 1375 CE, the Hohokam tradition lost vitality and stability, and many of the largest settlements were abandoned. Climate change apparently greatly affected Hohokam agriculture and so dispersed its large communities. Repeated floods in the mid-14th century greatly deepened the Salt River bed and destroyed canal heads, which required their continuous extension upstream. Soon, additional flooding removed irreplaceable segments of these extensions, which effectively rendered hundreds of miles of canals virtually useless. Because of differences in hydrology and geomorphology, these processes had less impact on Hohokam irrigation systems in the Gila River basin, yet these were abandoned, as well. Hohokam split into smaller groups, and the population declined slightly, at a peak rate 2 per 100 people between 1350 and 1400. This decline was previously greatly overestimated because smaller groups are harder to identify. Evidence that the human population was maintained are the unchanged prey animal populations.

==== Polvoron phase (1350/1375–1450 CE) ====
This phase is characterized by widespread use and manufacture of Salado polychrome, with both Gila and Tonto polychromes. After 1375 CE, the Hohokam abandoned most villages and canal systems in the lower Salt River basin. The area continued to be occupied, but on a far smaller scale. The few villages that remained were quite small, and were concentrated along the Gila River, with the notable exception of the lower Queen Creek drainage. This period is the aftermath of the Hohokam cultural collapse and a critical stage in the ethnogenesis of modern O'odham.

== Ceramic tradition ==
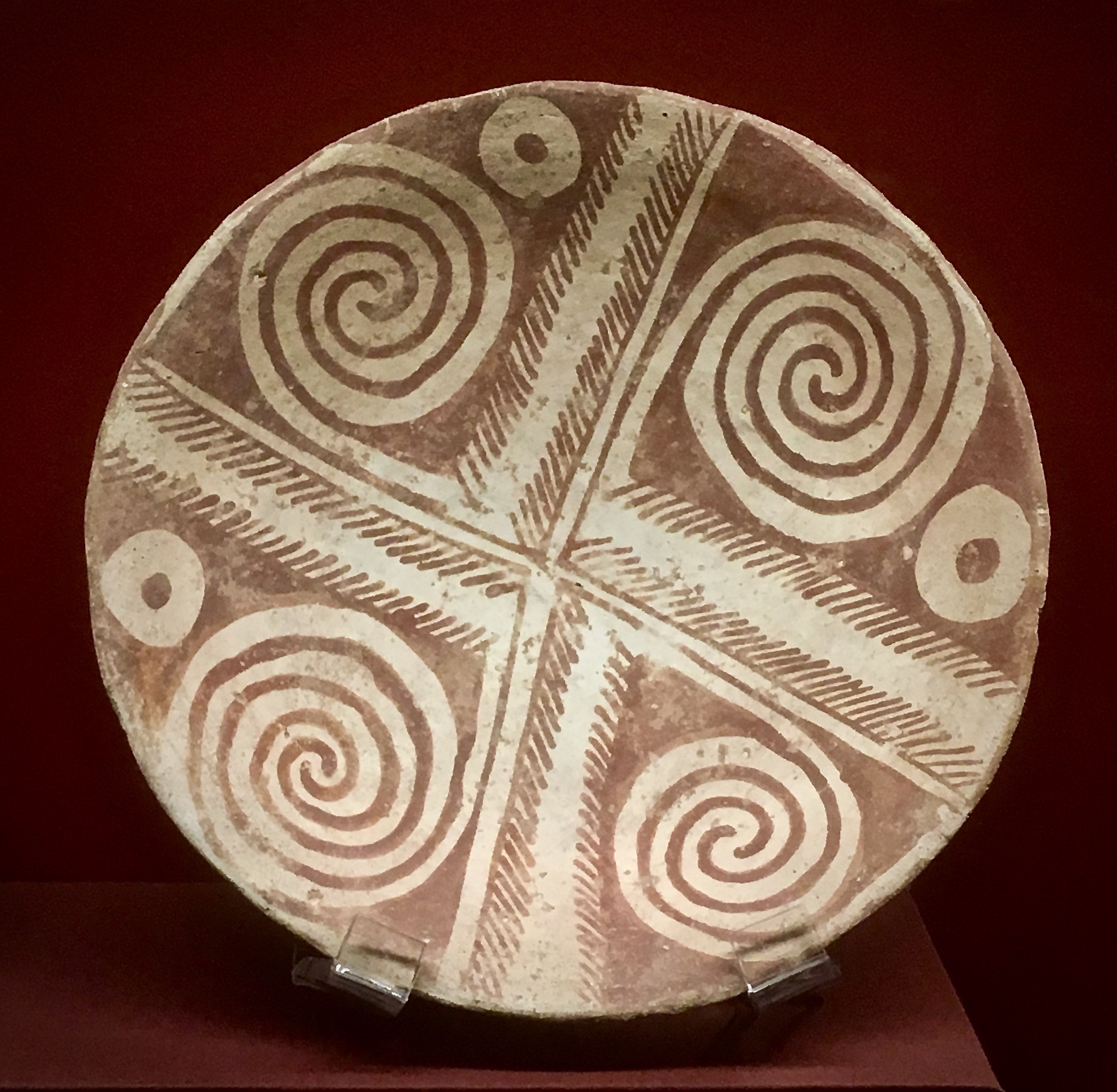
Hohokam Sacaton red-on-buff plate, ca. 950–1150 CE. On display at Pueblo Grande museum, Phoenix.

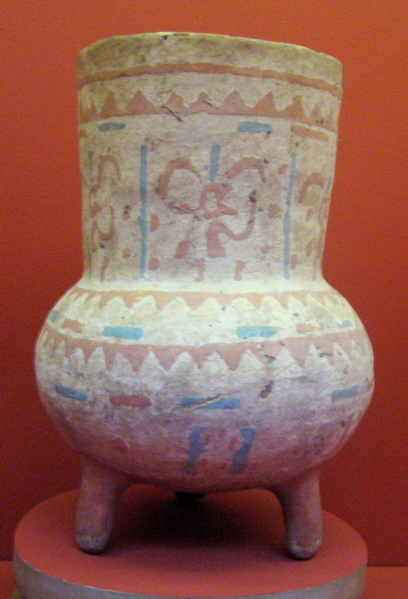
Hohokam pottery from Casa Grande

The earliest sedentary agricultural settlements in central Arizona date from 1000 to 500 BCE, yet the first ceramics appear just before the Hohokam rise in 300 CE.

Some archaeologists interpret the sudden appearance of pottery as new trade or immigration into the Phoenix area, resulting in the rise of the Hohokam. Other archaeologists classify many of the defining, cultural characteristics as already within the indigenous farming communities by Hohokam rise. Hence, pottery helps to fuel the controversy over Hohokam origins.

It was once thought that Hohokam pottery material varied by location, since communities used local resources. Recently, studies on the temper revealed a variety of origins where pottery was manufactured and traded. Several palettes, from different periods, were found in the Gila Bend Region. This is evidence that the Hohokam stayed in one area for a long time.

Hohokam ceramics are defined by a distinct Plain, Red, and Decorated buffware tradition, and were made using a technique called coiling. A small, fine clay base was connected to a series of coils. These coils were then thinned and shaped using a paddle and anvil. Hohokam Plain and Red wares were primarily tempered with a variety of materials including micaceous, phyllite, or Squaw Peak schist, as well as granite, quartz, quartzite, and arkosic sands. Analytically, based on the type of temper used, these are classified as to the geographic setting of their manufacture, and are referred to as Gila (Gila River basin), Wingfield (Agua Fria basin, the Northern Periphery, or Lower Verde area), Piestewa Peak (Phoenix metro area north of the Salt River), South Mountain (Phoenix metro area south of the Salt River), or Salt (Salt or Verde River basins) Plain and Red wares.

The surfaces of Plain wares were smoothed to some extent and many were polished, or slipped, with other minerals or clays. After the vessels were fired, these sometimes turned a color that ranged from light or dark brown, gray, to orange. Later, the interiors of bowls were slipped with a black carbonous material. Hohokam Red wares were slipped with an iron-based pigment that turned red after the vessel was fired. The manufacture of decorated Hohokam pottery was similar to that of the Plain wares. However, the clays tended to be of a finer quality and were tempered with caliche and limited amounts of very finely ground micaceous schist and small particles of vegetative material.

== Major core area villages and cities ==
The true measure of the Hohokam can only be derived from the sum of their material culture. This is best gleaned from a review of their principal population centers, or more appropriately, major villages or giant cities. Although sharing a common cultural expression, each of these major villages has its own unique history of emergence, growth, and eventual abandonment. Including outlines of archaeological exploration, provided below are brief descriptions of the largest and most important prehistoric villages, towns, and cities found within the so-called Hohokam core area.

=== Snaketown ===
Snaketown was the archetypical Preclassic period settlement and preeminent community centered within the core of the Hohokam culture area. Today, Snaketown is situated within the Hohokam Pima National Monument, located near Santan, Arizona, which was authorized by Congress on October 21, 1972. Excavations conducted in the 1930s and again in the 1960s revealed that the site was inhabited from about 300 BCE to 1050 CE. At its height in the early 11th century, Snaketown was the center of both the Hohokam culture and the production of the distinctive Hohokam buff ware. Following the last excavations conducted by Emil Haury, the site was completely recovered with earth, leaving nothing visible above ground.

Overall, Snaketown boasted two ball courts, numerous trash mounds, a small ceremonial mound, a large central plaza, several large community houses, and hundreds of residential pithouses, and may have been home to at least several thousand people. After Snaketown was abandoned, several minor settlements were founded within the general vicinity and continued to be occupied until the early 14th century CE. The Hohokam Pima National Monument is located on Gila River Indian Community (GRIC) land and is under tribal ownership. It covers nearly 1,700 acres (688 ha) (6.9 km^{2}). The GRIC has decided not to open this extremely sensitive prehistoric site to the public.

=== Grewe-Casa Grande ===
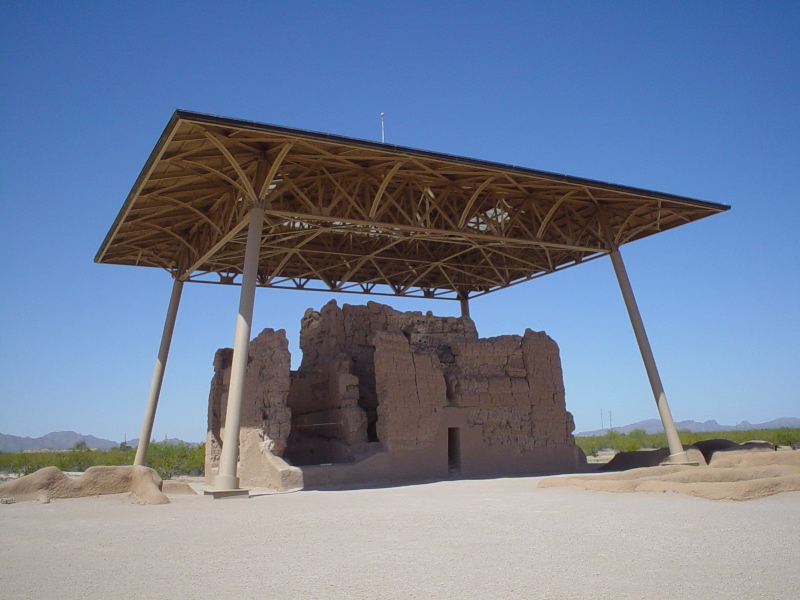
The roof shown was built in 1932, to protect the Great House or Casa Grande, at the Casa Grande Ruins National Monument.

Altogether, the greater Grewe-Casa Grande Site represented the largest Hohokam community located within the middle Gila River valley. Situated between two primary canals (on the north, Canal Casa Grande and to the south Canal Coolidge), over time, this community was recorded as several separate archaeological sites. These include the Casa Grande, Grewe, Vahki Inn Village, and Horvath sites. Occupied in the Preclassic and Classic periods, each of these sites was composed of between two and 20 large residential areas. Overall, the greater Grewe-Casa Grande archaeological site covered about 900 acres (3.6 km^{2}), centered on State Route 87 and immediately north of the modern city of Coolidge, Arizona.

Most observers are attracted to the four-story great house found near the center of the Casa Grande Ruins National Monument. Akimel O'odham oral tradition records that before the appearance of the Coyote People appeared, this massive structure was built by an important chieftain called Sial Teu-utak Sivan, (turqoise Leader) or "Chief Turquoise". In the ancient hohokam language, the great house and the associated prehistoric ruins found north of Coolidge were collectively referred to as Sivan Vah'Ki, literally meaning the "Abandoned House", or "Village of the king/chieftain", respectively. As Frank Russell recorded in the early 20th century, several O'odham oral traditions note that Sial Teu-utak was an important leader of the Casa Grande community, before the overthrow of the Suwu'Ki O'odham, or "Vulture People". Eusebio Francesco Chini (Father Kino) arrived in the middle Gila River valley in 1694 to find the monumental great house abandoned and already in a state of decay and decomposition. Despite its condition, later Jesuit missionaries and he used the great house to hold Mass, between the late 17th and 18th centuries.

Adolph Bandelier provided one of the first detailed archaeological maps and descriptions of Classic period architecture at the central locus, or Compound A, of the Casa Grande site, in 1884. Jesse Walter Fewkes and Cosmos Mindeleff made further descriptions of this area. Between 1906 and 1912, Fewkes conducted excavations and stabilization of this portion of the site. In 1927, Harold Gladwin excavated stratified tests of several trash mounds at both the Grewe and Casa Grande sites. He also defined and excavated portions of Sacaton 9:6 (GP), an adobe-walled compound situated on the extreme edge of the Casa Grande site, east of State Route 87, near the current entrance to the monument. Relatively large-scale excavations were carried out between 1930 and 1931, by Van Bergen-Los Angeles Museum Expedition under the direction of Arthur Woodward and Irwin Hayden. This project concentrated on a 30-acre (120,000 m^{2}) parcel at the Grewe site, and Compound F located within the northeast corner of the Casa Grande National Monument. Overall, including the recovery of 172 burials and hundreds of thousands of artifacts, about 60 pithouses, numerous pits, 27 adobe pitrooms, and a ballcourt were excavated or tested during the course of this project.

Additional excavations were performed in the southeast corner of the monument by the Civil Works Administration directed by Russell Hastings in 1933 and 1934. The excavation of 15 pithouses, three pits, 32 burials, and portions of four trash mounds demonstrated the presence of significantly large late Preclassic and early Classic period components within the area covered by the monument. Yet, by far the largest and most comprehensive archaeological endeavor was conducted by Northland Research Inc., from 1995 to 1997, on a 13-acre (53,000 m^{2}) parcel within portions of the Casa Grande, Grewe, and Horvath sites that paralleled State Routes 87 and 287. This project was directed by Douglass Craig, and resulted in the identification and/or excavation of 247 pithouses, 24 pitrooms, 866 pits, 11 canal alignments, a ballcourt, and portions of four adobe-walled compounds, as well as the recovery of 158 burials and over 400,000 artifacts.

Based on the results of these projects, the history of the greater Grewe-Casa Grande site can be reconstructed with at least some degree of precision. The genesis of this important village appears to have been associated with several groups of pithouses organized around a series of relatively small, circular plazas. These appear to date to the sixth century CE and were located along and immediately upslope of the Coolidge Canal system. By the eighth century CE, this dispersed hamlet had expanded nearly a kilometer south and developed into a full-fledged summer home for the priests and chieftain. At this point, the settlement consisted of densely packed yet discrete groups of pithouses clustered around small open courtyards. In turn these structures delineated a large central plaza. Adjoining the plaza was a medium-sized ballcourt, and overall, the village was affiliated with several smaller outlying settlements.

In the 10th century, at least two large secondary villages and about a dozen new hamlets were founded to the west of the main settlement. With the abandonment of Snaketown and the transition from the Preclassic to Classic periods, the greater Grewe-Casa Grande community became one of the largest and most important Hohokam population centers. At its height, the Grewe-Casa Grande village boosted about 100 trash mounds, several hundred residential pithouses, and four or five ballcourts. Regardless of its size, complexity, and significance along the middle Gila River, this settlement never seemed to have attained the status enjoyed by Snaketown, as it pertained to the Hohokam culture, per se. As the western portion of this settlement grew, large sections of the eastern half declined and were abandoned. By 1300 CE, the village was composed of about 19 adobe-walled residential compounds, several pitroom clusters, a platform mound, a great house, and numerous trash mounds. With most of the village contained within what is now the Casa Grande Ruins National Monument, after the middle of the 14th century, it began a rapid decline. Around 1400 or 1450 CE, the entire settlement was abandoned, except for a low-scale occupation associated with the Polvoron phase.

Today, about 60% of the Grewe-Casa Grande site has been either destroyed due to agricultural and commercial development, excavated, or remains relatively intact buried under fields used to grow cotton. About 40% of this once huge settlement can be found within the Casa Grande Ruins National Monument, which was established as the nation's first archeological reserve in 1892, and declared a national monument in 1918. Visitors can enjoy an interpretative center, walk among the stabilized ruins of Compound A, and closely view the great house, which has been protected since 1932 from the elements by a distinctively modern-looking roof.

=== Pueblo Grande ===
Pueblo Grande Museum Archeological Park near central Phoenix contains preserved ruins and artifact exhibits. Archaeological finds have been recorded along the track of the adjacent Valley Metro light-rail construction.

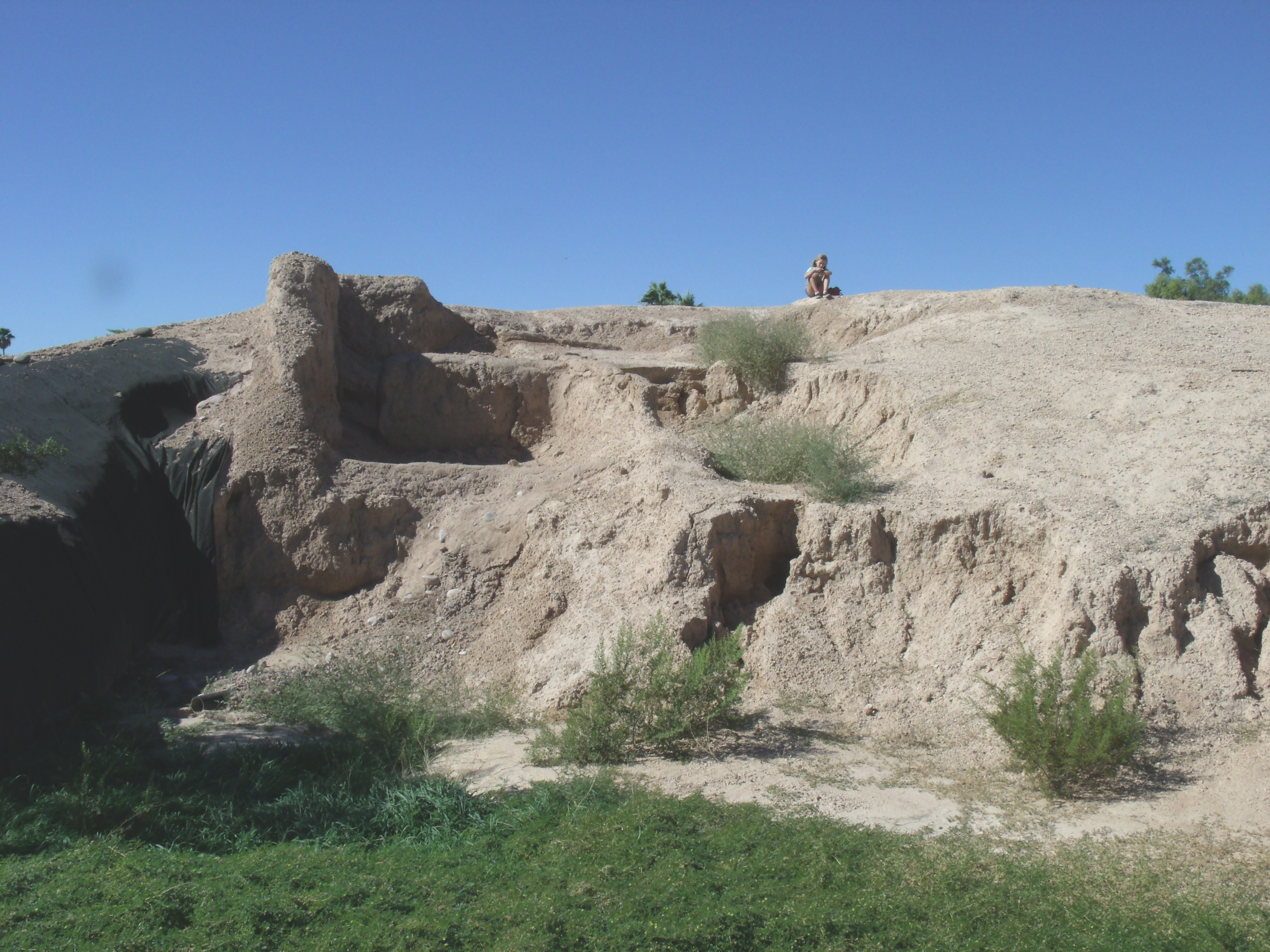
The Mesa Grande Temple Mound is located in the Mesa Grande Cultural Park at 1000 N. Date St. Built by the Hohokam in 1100 CE, the walls are made of caliche, the calcium carbonate hardpan that forms under the desert soils. The mound is longer and wider than a modern football field and is 27 feet high.

=== Mesa Grande ===
The Mesa Grande ruin, located in Mesa, Arizona, represents another large Hohokam village that was occupied both in the Preclassic and Classic periods, from around 200 to 1450 CE. Although this settlement appears to have been very important, it has had little archaeological work, other than the mapping and stabilization projects conducted by the Southwest Archaeology Team (SWAT). The SWAT's volunteer work at the Mesa Grande ruin began in the middle 1990s and continues today.

At its peak in the late Preclassic and early Classic periods, this settlement may have consisted of as many as 20 discrete residential areas and covered several hundred acres. Today, due to massive urban development, the surface remains of the village have been reduced to a 6.4-acre parcel situated immediately west of the old Mesa Hospital. Within this plot are the ruins of a large adobe compound and a nine-meters-high, relatively intact, platform mound. This is only one of the last three remaining Hohokam platform mounds in the greater Phoenix metro area. This parcel was transferred into public ownership in the mid-1980s, therefore the compound and mound were not destroyed and a full visitor center exists on the enclosed site that is open October–May annually.

=== Las Colinas and Los Hornos ===
Located within the modern city of Tempe, Arizona, the Hohokam settlement of Los Hornos (from the Spanish los hornos, meaning 'the ovens') was initially investigated by Frank Cushing in 1887. With urban expansion, additional excavations were conducted in the 1970s, late 1980s, and throughout the 1990s. The results of these comprehensive archaeological projects have documented both a large Preclassic- and Classic-period village organized much the same as Snaketown and Pueblo Grande, respectively, yet on a somewhat smaller scale. Los Hornos appears to have started around 400 CE, as a small cluster of rectangular pithouses situated on the extreme western edge of the site, west of Priest Dr and south of US 60.

Over time, the Los Hornos settlement expanded along a series of large secondary canals to the east and southeast. At the height of the Preclassic occupation in the Sacaton phase, which was contemporary with the zenith of Snaketown, this settlement had one large ball court, a large central plaza, several formal cremation cemeteries, numerous trash mounds, and several hundred residential pithouses. The detailed excavation of 50 Preclassic period pithouses in the area located immediately south of US 60 and east of Priest Dr, provided invaluable information concerning residential architecture and the functional use of interior space. Additional information concerning the Archaeological Consulting Services Ltd. excavation of a Preclassic occupation at Los Hornos can be found at the following site.

After a short period of population loss and community reorganization in the late 11th and early 12th centuries CE, Los Hornos continued to shift east and south in the Classic period. This large village appears to have recovered somewhat and again became an important settlement late in the Soho or early in the Civano phases, from 1277 to 1325 CE. At this time, Los Hornos, now centered on Hardy Dr south of US 60 and north of Baseline Road, consisted of about 15 residential compounds, a large central plaza, a large rectangular platform mound with an associated compound, several large trash mounds, and numerous borrow pits and inhumation and cremation cemeteries.

Prior to the middle of the 14th century CE, with the rise of Los Muertos located several miles to the southeast, the Los Hornos community appears to have spiraled into a precipitous decline. Although greatly reduced in scale and importance, the city continued to be occupied until it was effectively abandoned between 1400 and 1450 CE, as was much of the Lower Salt River basin. Today, much of the Los Hornos village has been destroyed due to modern transportation, residential, and commercial development, or has been excavated. The only surface vestiges of this once significant Hohokam city are the remains of several low trash mounds found in the Old Guadalupe Village Cemetery.

== Archaeological sites ==
The following Hohokam archaeological sites and museums are open to the public, except for Hohokam Pima National Monument.

- Casa Grande Ruins National Monument, Coolidge, Arizona. Casa Grande Ruins National Monument
- Hohokam Pima National Monument (Snaketown), Gila River Indian Reservation (closed to public).
- Indian Mesa, Peoria, Arizona
- Mesa Grande Ruins, Mesa, Arizona.
- Painted Rock Petroglyph Site, Theba, Arizona
- Park of the Canals, Mesa, Arizona.
- Pueblo Grande Museum Archeological Park, Phoenix, Arizona.
- Sears-Kay Ruin – Hohokam Fort on top of a foothill in Carefree, Arizona.
- White Tank Mountain Regional Park, White Tank Mountains

== Gallery ==
Images related to Hohokam culture
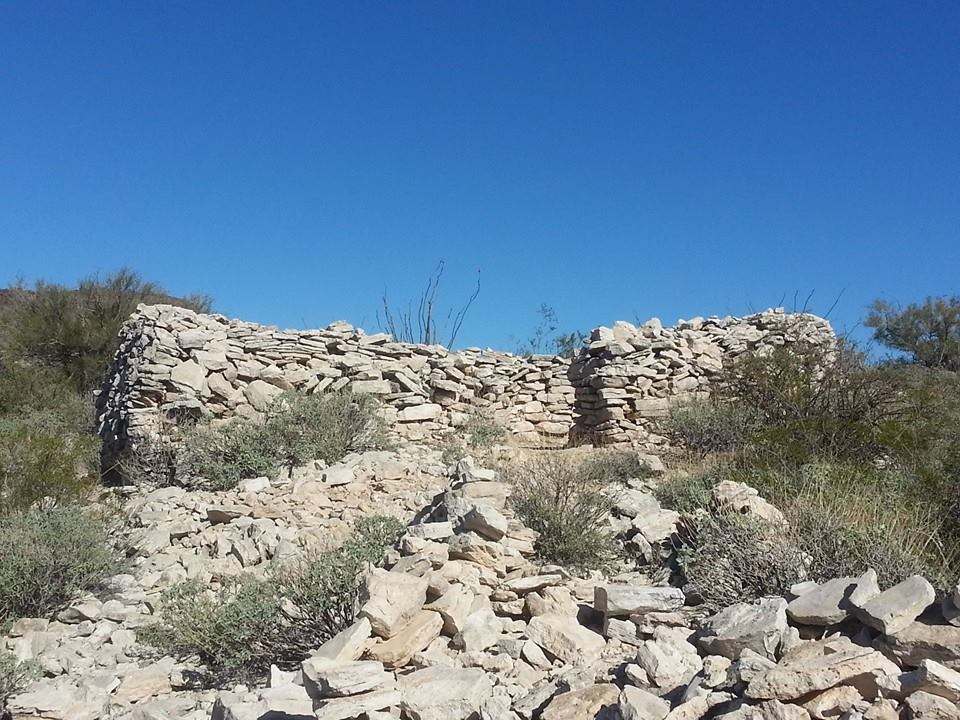
The ruins of a Hohokam village on top of Indian Mesa

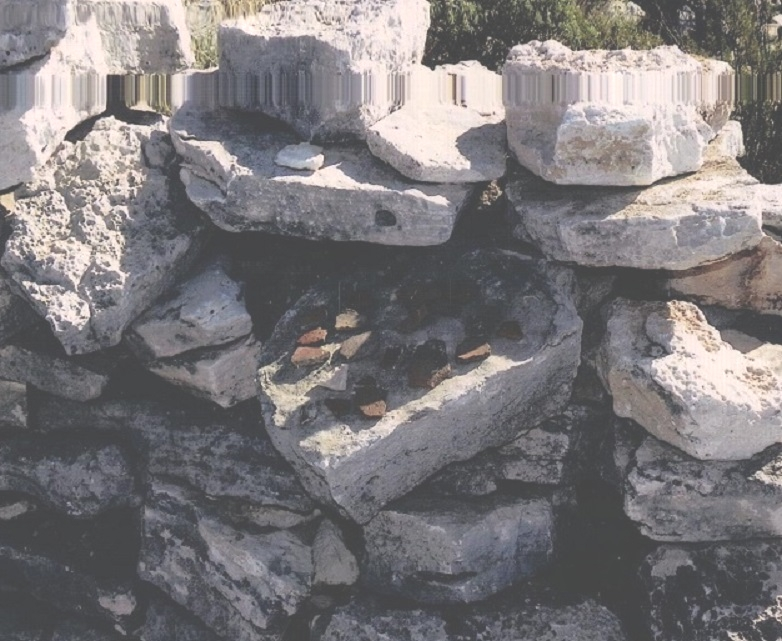
Hohokam pottery sherds (The small brown ones) found in the ruins on top of Indian Mesa.

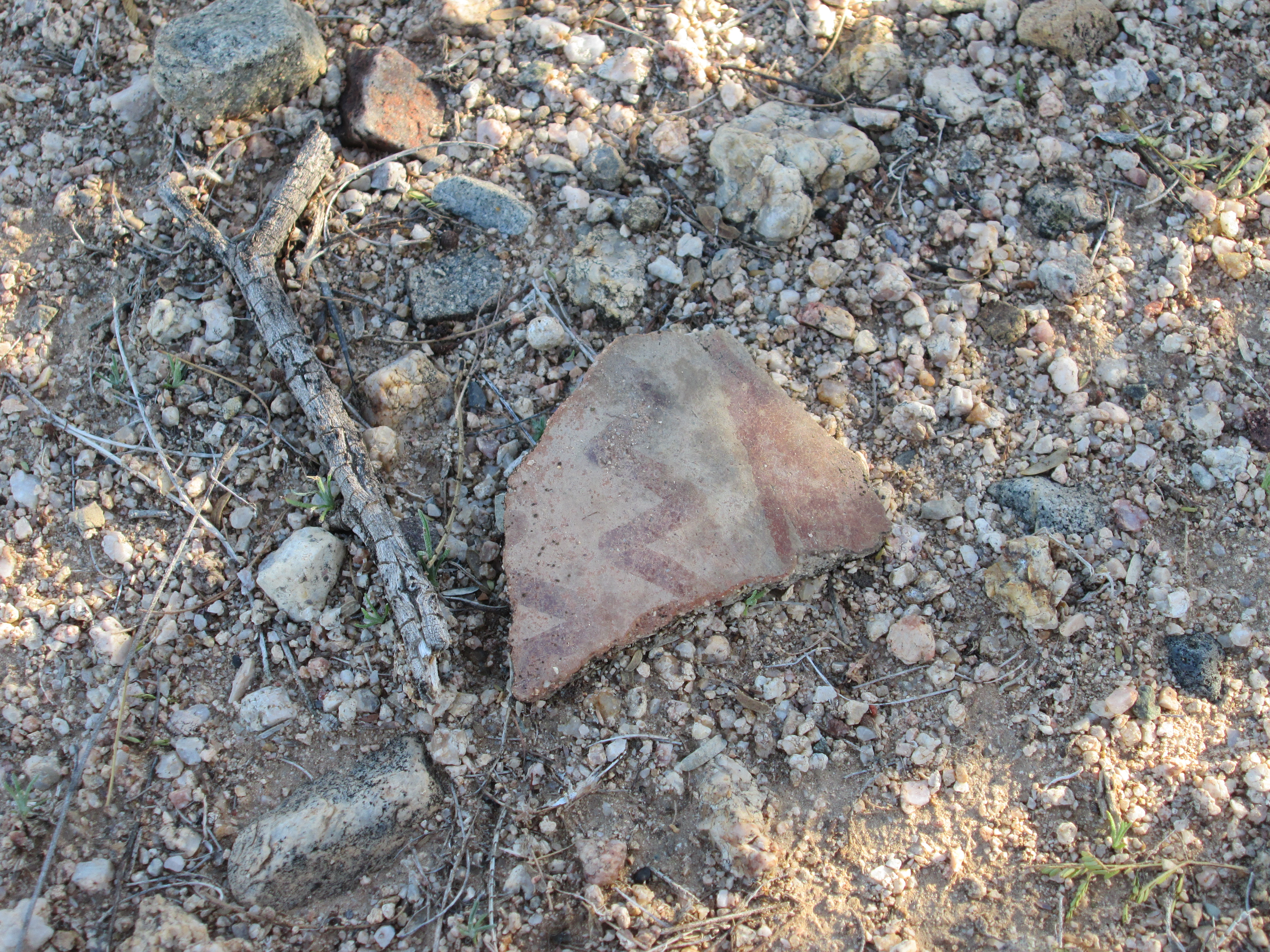
Hohokam pottery sherd in the Tucson Basin, with distinctive red paint.

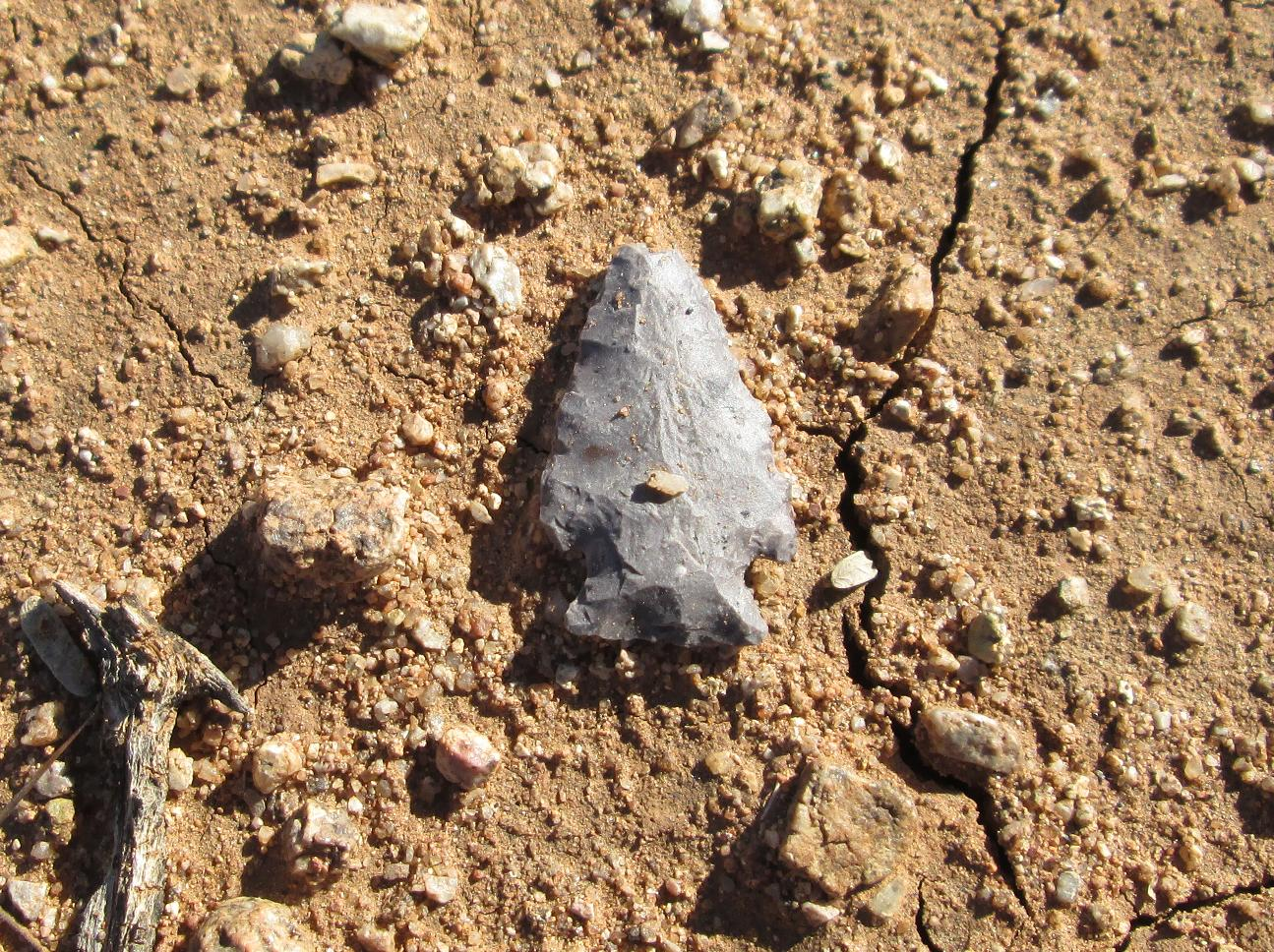
Hohokam corner-notched arrowhead in situ in the Tucson Basin

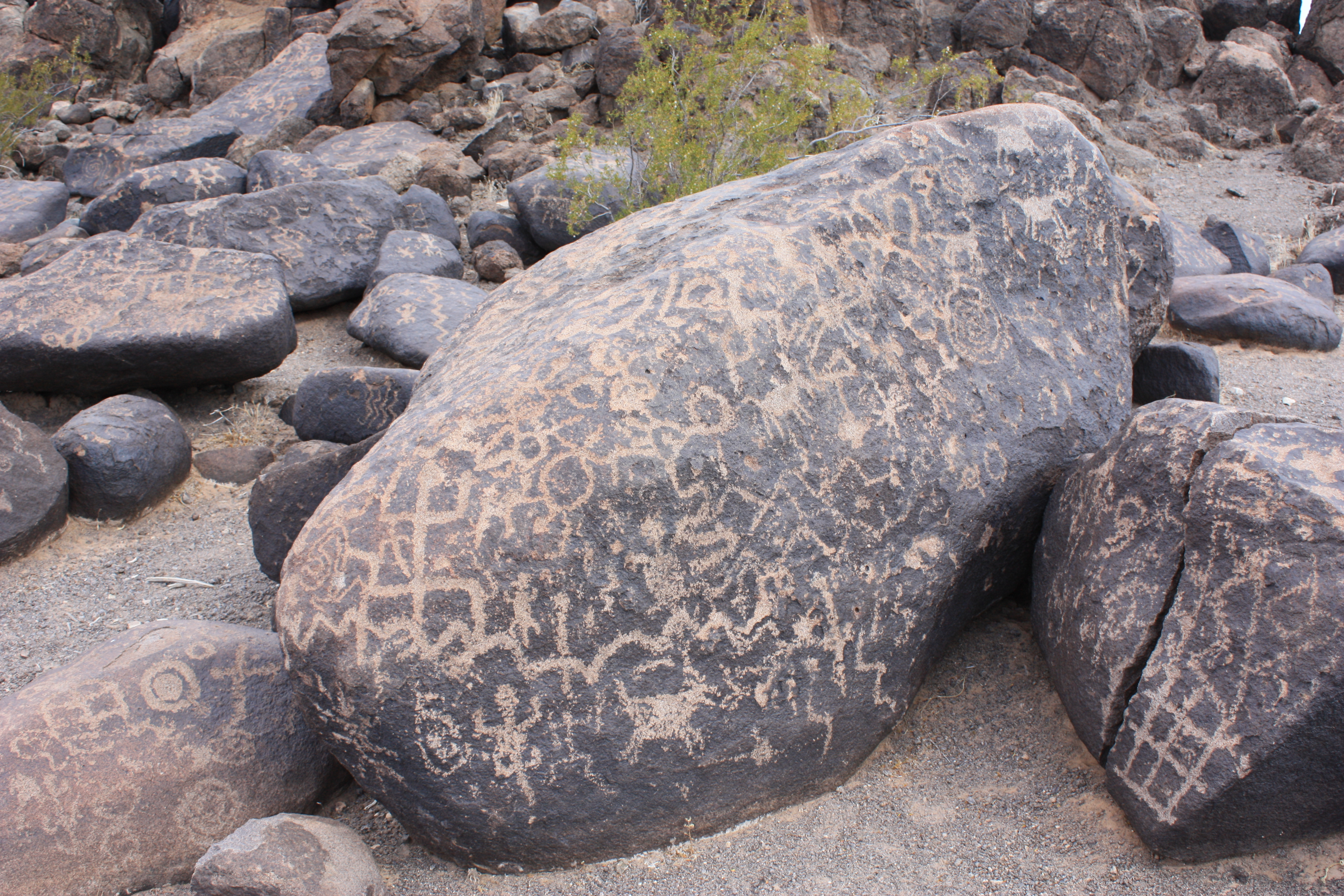
Petroglyphs at the Painted Rock Petroglyph Site.

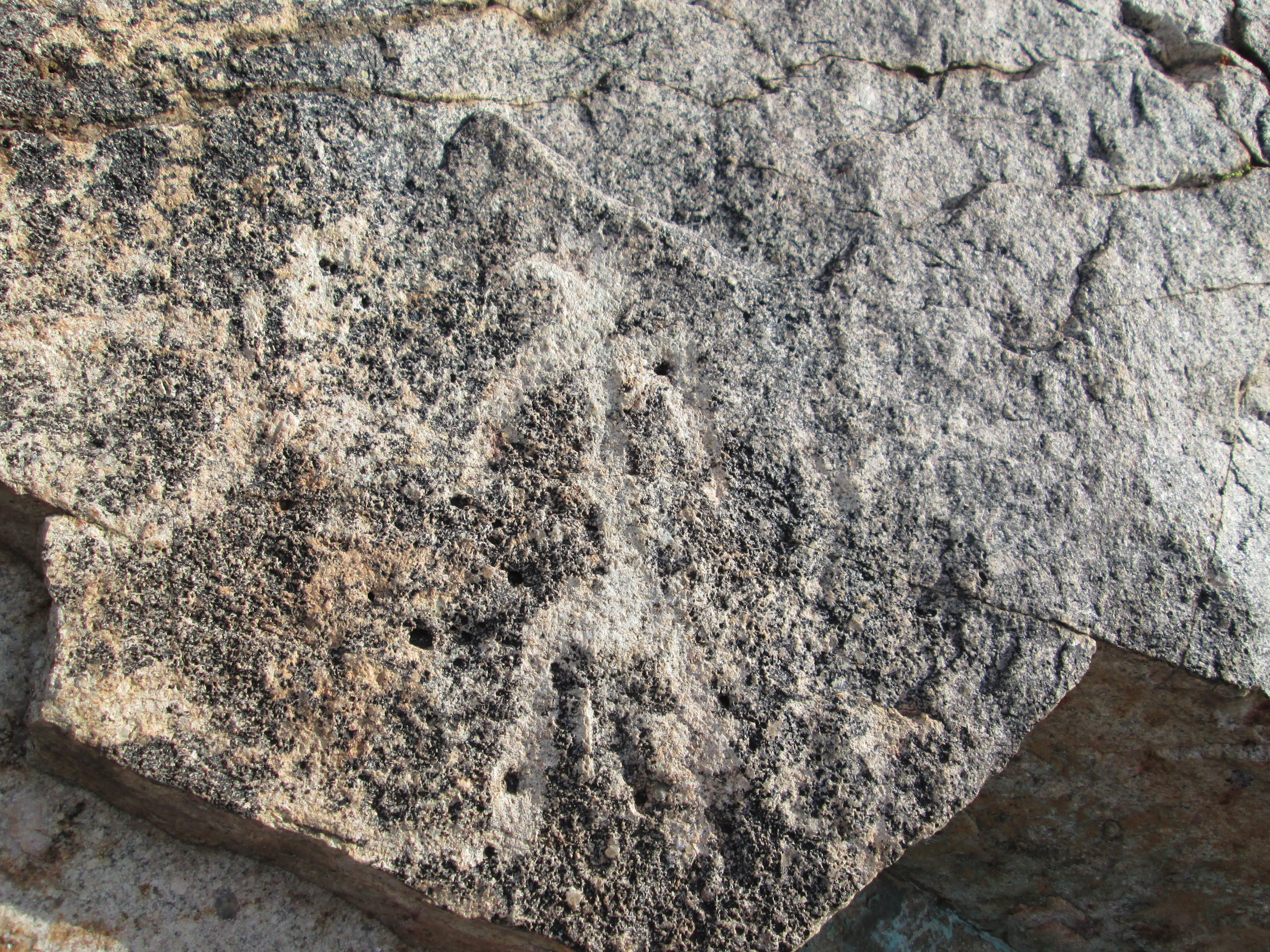
Pictographs at Huerfano Butte.

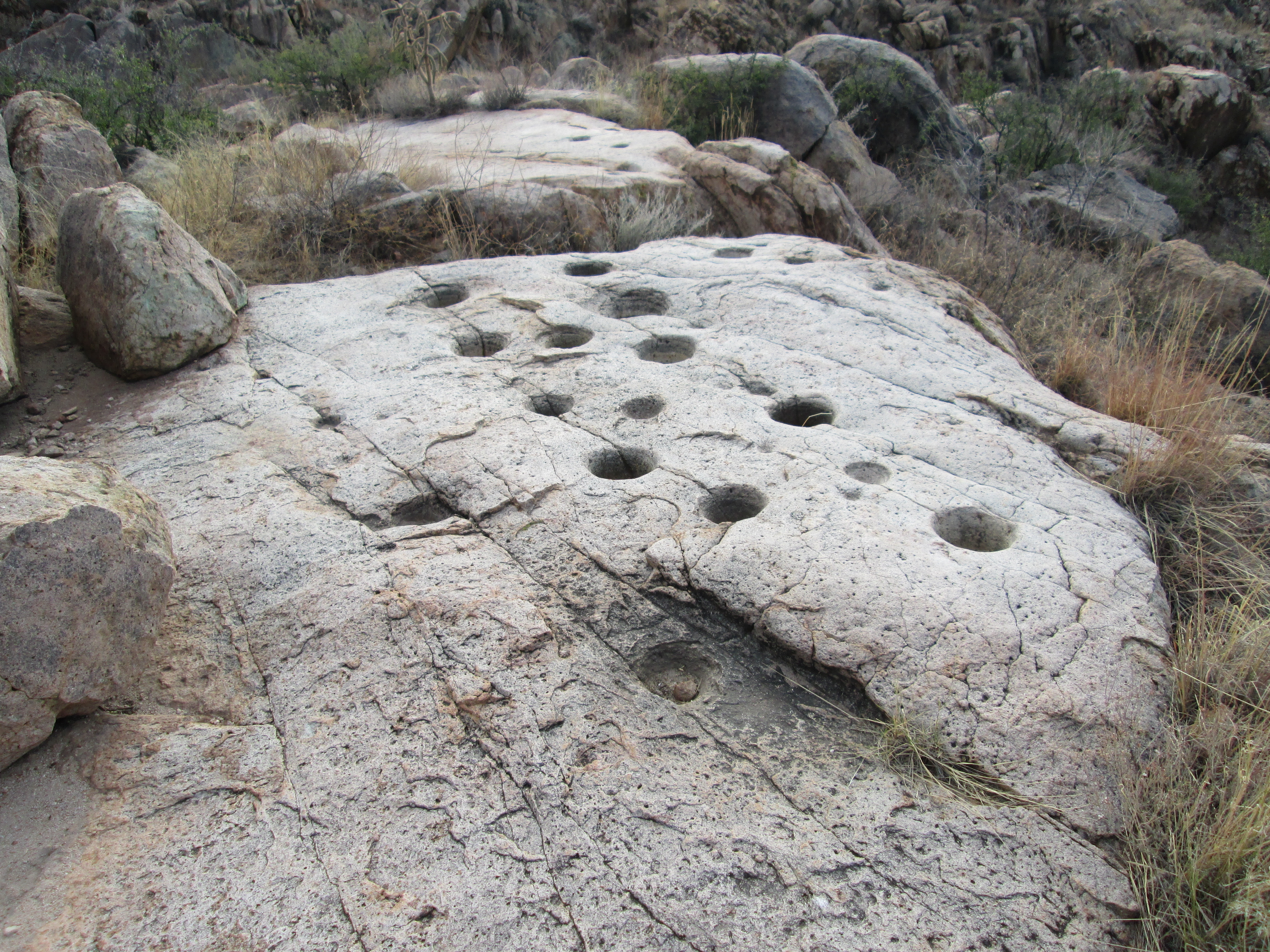
Bedrock mortars at Huerfano Butte

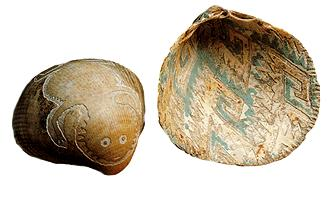
Hohokam Glycymeris shell art.

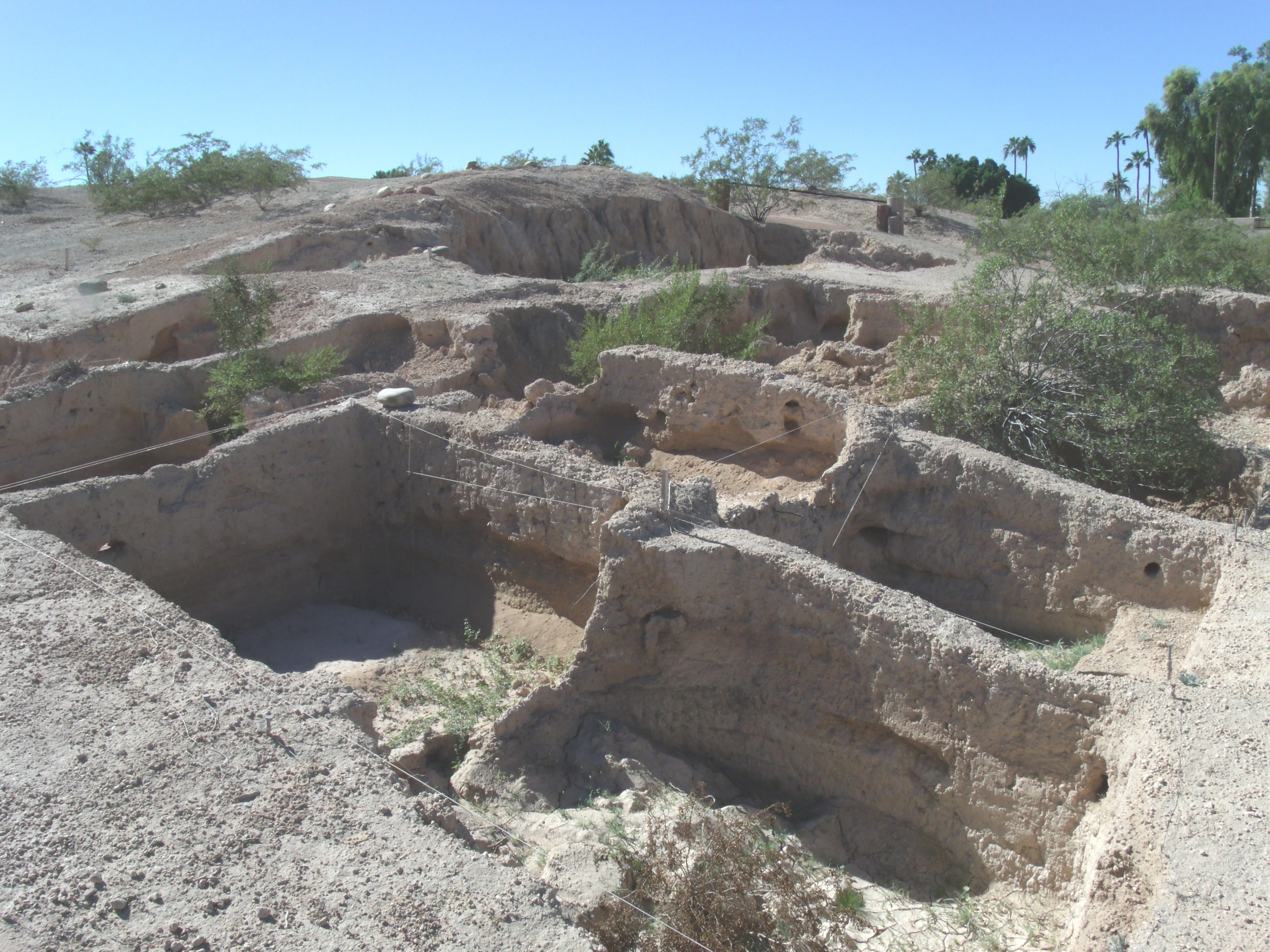
A large plaza in front of the Mesa Grande Temple Mound which was enclosed by a large adobe wall.

== See also ==
- Agriculture in the prehistoric Southwest
- Ancestral Puebloans
- Oasisamerica cultures
- List of dwellings of Pueblo peoples
