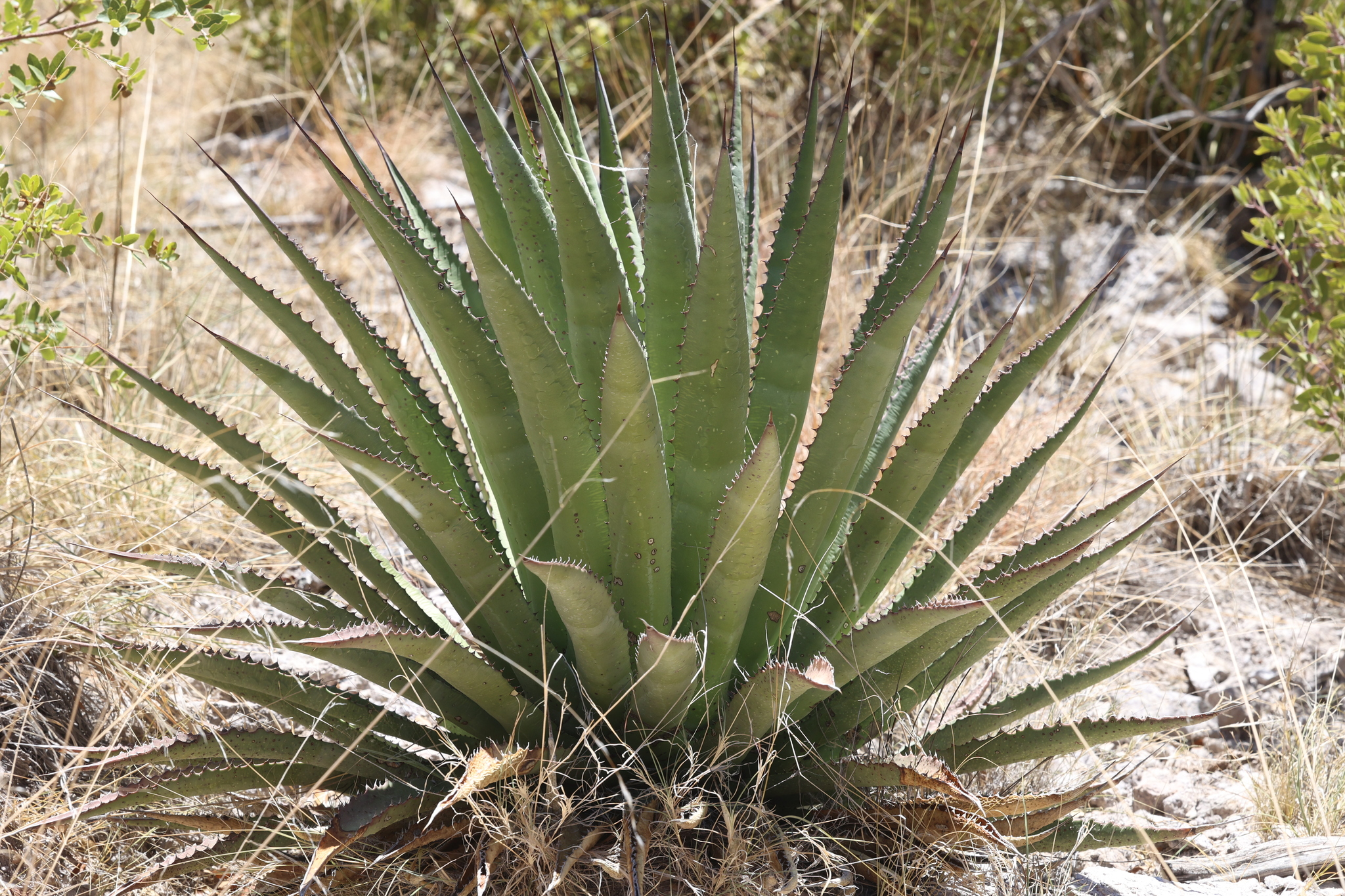
- In Chiricahua National Monument, Arizona

Conservation status
- Least Concern (IUCN 3.1)

- Apparently Secure (NatureServe)

Scientific classification
- Kingdom: Plantae
- Clade: Tracheophytes
- Clade: Angiosperms
- Clade: Monocots
- Order: Asparagales
- Family: Asparagaceae
- Subfamily: Agavoideae
- Genus: Agave
- Species: A. palmeri

Binomial name
- Agave palmeri Engelm.

= Agave palmeri =

Species of flowering plant

Agave palmeri (also known as Palmer's century plant) is an especially large member of the genus Agave, in the family Asparagaceae.

== Description ==
Agave palmeri is the largest Agave species growing in the United States. It produces a basal leaf rosette of fleshy, upright green leaves of up to 120 centimetres (4 feet) in length, with jagged edges and ending in sharp, thick spines of 3–6 cm (1 1/4–2 1/4 inches) long. The buds are purplish. Blooming from June to August, the flowers are pale yellow and green; they are 4–5 cm (1 1/2–2 in) long with six segments and stamens, growing on branches from the upper third of the flower spike, which can be up to 5 metres (16 ft) tall.

== Distribution and habitat ==
The plant is native to southern Arizona, southwestern New Mexico, Sonora and Chihuahua. It can be found in dry, rocky areas.

== Cultivation ==
The plant is frequently cultivated as an ornamental in other regions. It requires a large pot but is very tolerant of a wide range of conditions, including temperatures of around −10 °C.

== Uses ==
The plant was used by Native Americans for food, drink, fiber, soap, medicine and to make lances.
