= Stephen Angus McComber =

Stephen McComber (born December 19, 1955), also known as Silverbear is a seed-saver and advocate for traditional Indigenous foods, an artist and leader, from the Mohawk community Kahnawà:ke, from the Kanien'hehá:ka (People of the Flint). He is part of the Haudenosaunee Confederacy, also known as the People of the Longhouse. His Haudenosaunee name is Kateroton, meaning Standing Root.

== Work history ==
McComber works as a Native chaplain with Corrections Canada.

== Art ==
Stephen McComber is a soap stone sculptor with pieces within the McCord Museum Collection as well as wood carver who created a carving of Kateri Tekakwitha for Saint-Paul University.

McComber has been working soap stone and wood for 55 years now and has many pieces of work in various locations including the permanent collections of the McCord Museum, the archives of the University of McGill in Montreal and the Ministry of Indigenous and Northern Affairs Canada in Ottawa.

He was awarded by the Canada Council for the arts and awarded in the category of Visual Art in 1985.

His work is permanently exposed at Pointe-à-Callière Museum in Montreal. One of the pieces at the museum is called Tionhnhekwen (Forces nourricières) Stéatite, 2006.

== Band council ==
Stephen McComber is presently Chief (Ratsénhaienhs - male) Leading the Sustainability portfolio for the Mohawk Council of Kahnawà:ke. He is responsible for the following dossiers:

- Environment
- Indigenous Rights & Research
- Heritage
- Health
- Social Supports & Development

Each Chief must follow the code of conduct and exert their responsibilities within this code.

McComber is also responsible with supporting food sovereignty initiatives in his community and shares his knowledge with his community on food banks, seed growing and gardening in Kahnawá:ke.

McComber has appeared on Kahnawà:ke TV on the show Chiefs Uncut. He takes the opportunity to present his roles as Sustainability Chief. He shares the story of the Glass Gem Popcorn and Carl Barnes, a part-Cherokee farmer living in Oklahoma who shared the seeds with him. Stephen believes that using popcorn to teach children is the best way to get them involved in seed saving because it is more fun to see the seeds pop.

== Seed saving ==
McComber works to preserve and protect seeds from the entirety of the Iroquois Confederation of the Six Nations of Grand River. These communities are rematriating their seeds within the confederacy of the Mohawks, Oneida, Onondaga, Cayuga, Seneca and Tuscarora. These communities have contributed to the revival of many traditional seed varieties within the Three Sisters seed family of Beans, Corn & Squash. Similar seed saving is being done in California through indigenous organizations like Native Seed Search, demonstrating their resilience through growing their locally adapted native seeds.

The various corns in his collection range from Flint Corn, Flour Corn, Sweet Corn, Popcorn, Dent Corn & Ceremonial Corn, often called Grandfather corn.

McComber gardens according to the phases of the moon or moon cycles.

Summary of what to do during the phases of the moon:

- New moon: plant greens and grains
- Waxing moon: plant the types of seed from inside the fruit
- Full moon: transplanting, harvesting and preserving
- Waning moon: soil preparation, but no planting

McComber supports seed education and food sovereignty in his community.

McComber works closely with Bakers Creek Seed company, one of the biggest Heirloom seed companies in the North America, residing in Mansfield MO, USA. He was invited to be a keynote speaker at their events in 2024 and receives donated seed for his community to teach children about seeds and seed saving.

== Traditional foods and recipes ==
Chuck Hughes and the First Peoples Kitchen on APTN - Season 4 -Episode 13 - Chuck interviewed Stephen McComber and the community about how to grow corn out at the Three Sisters gardens in Kahnawà:ke and what is the process of nixtamalization of flour corn to create a traditional corn and bean soup.

== Personal life ==
McComber was born into the Bear Clan. He is the grandfather of 9 and great-grandfather of 2.
