= Baby corn =

Type of cereal grain

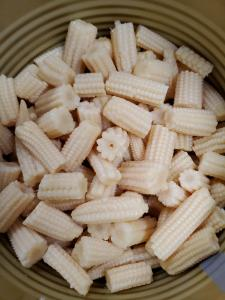
- A bowl of cooked baby corn
- Alternative names: Young corn, cornlettes, child corn, baby sweetcorn
- Food energy (per 85 g serving): 19 kcal (79 kJ)
Nutritional value
(per 85 g serving)
- Protein: 0.7 g
- Fat: 0.3 g
- Carbohydrate: 4.2 g
- Similar dishes: Corn

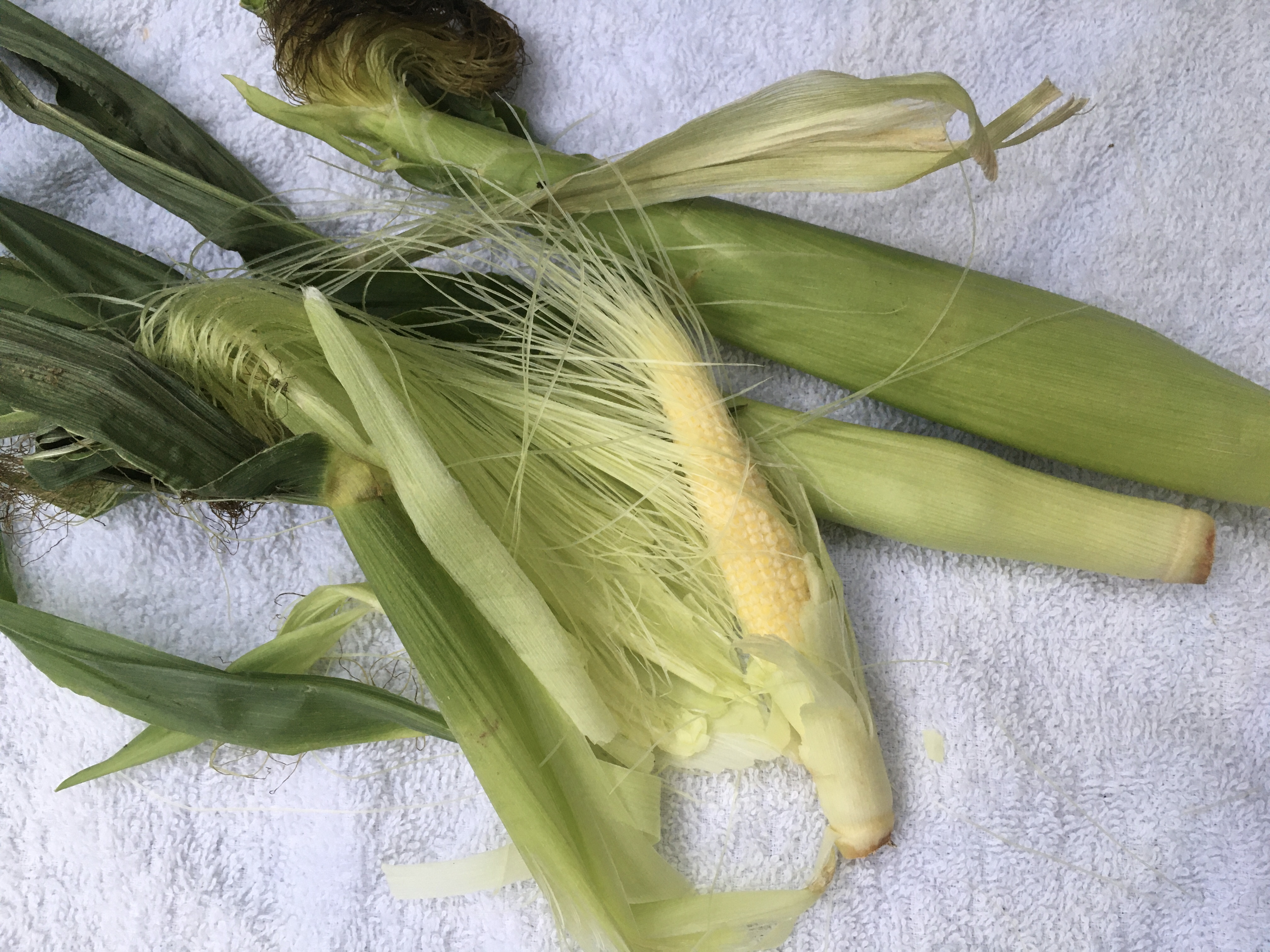
Baby corn still in the husk

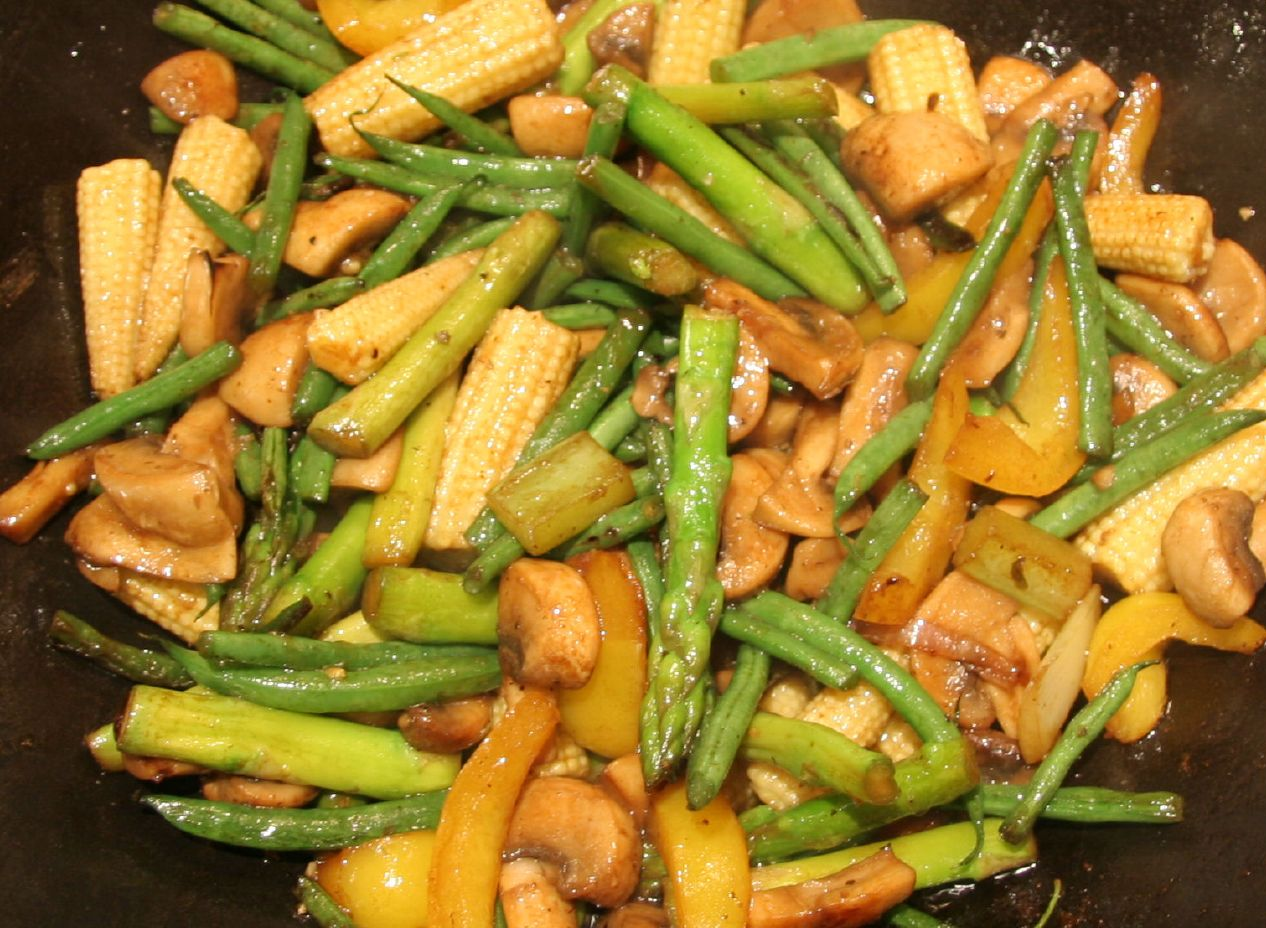
A stir fry of a mixture of vegetables including baby corn

Baby corn (also known as young corn, cornlettes, child corn or baby sweetcorn) is a cereal grain taken from corn (maize) harvested early while the stalks are still small and immature. It typically is eaten whole including the cob, in raw, pickled, and cooked forms. Baby corn is common in stir fry dishes.

== Production methods ==
There are two methods for producing baby corn: either as a primary crop, or as a secondary crop in a planting of sweet corn or field corn. In the first method, a seed variety is chosen and planted to produce only baby corn. Many varieties are suitable, but those developed specifically for baby corn tend to produce more ears per plant. In the second production method, the variety is selected to produce sweet or field corn. The second ear from the top of the plant is harvested for baby corn, while the top ear is allowed to mature.

Baby corn ears are hand-picked as soon as the corn silks emerge from the ear tips, or a few days after. Corn generally matures very quickly, so the harvest of baby corn must be timed carefully to avoid ending up with more mature corn ears. Baby corn production mostly occurs in Asia, as it is a specialized form of corn farming often requiring hand picking, which is generally not compatible with mechanized corn agriculture practiced in the United States. Baby corn ears are typically 4.5–10 cm (1 3/4–4 in) in length and 0.7 to 1.7 cm (1/4–3/4 in) in diameter.

== Uses ==
Baby corn is consumed worldwide. It is often associated with Chinese-American food, such as stir-fry, though it is not as widely used in China.

Baby corn forage can also be fed fresh or ensiled to livestock animals.
