= List of sweetcorn varieties =

This is a list of commonly cultivated varieties of sweet corn, and the approximate number of days from germination of corn plant to harvest. Unless otherwise noted with the term open pollinated, all varieties are hybrids.

Genetically modified varieties only available to large-scale commercial growers, such as Bt corn and glyphosate resistant corn, are not listed.

== Standard (su) ==
The oldest type of sweet corn contains more sugar and less starch than field corn intended for livestock. Tends to be heartier in respect to planting depth, germination and growth than other types. Begins conversion of sugar to starch after peak maturity or harvest, and as such is best eaten immediately after harvest.

=== Yellow su ===
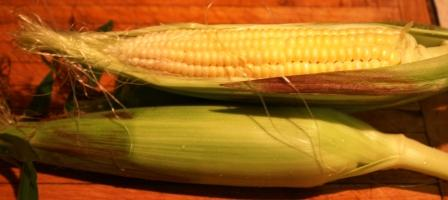
Ears of 'Early Sunglow' from a home garden

- Early Sunglow, 62 days
- Sundance, 69 days
- Early Golden Bantam, 80 days (heirloom, open pollinated. Introduced in 1902, this became the first widely grown yellow sweet corn. The original strain is now often called 'Golden Bantam 8 Row' to indicate it has 8 rows of kernels on the ear. A number of "improved" strains exist with 12 or more rows of kernels on the ear)
- Iochief, 80 days (1951 AAS winner)
- True Gold, 80+ days (open pollinated selection from Golden Jubilee Hybrid)
- Golden Cross Bantam, 85 days (Introduced in 1933, this became the first widely grown hybrid sweet corn for both home gardens and commercial growers)
- Golden Jubilee, 90+ days

=== White su ===
- True Platinum, 80 days (open pollinated)
- Martian Jewels, 80+ days (open pollinated, unusual purple stalks and cobs)
- Luther Hill, 82 days (heirloom, open pollinated)
- Country Gentleman, 92 days (heirloom, shoepeg type, open pollinated)
- Silver Queen, 92 days
- Stowell's Evergreen, 98 days (heirloom, open pollinated. In northern climates or higher altitudes, this variety may not reach full maturity in the growing season. However, before the killing frost entire stalks may be harvested, including the partially mature ears, and hung in a barn or shed. Ears may then be picked for a month or more, hence the name evergreen.)

=== Bicolor su ===
- Double Standard, 73 days (open pollinated)
- Butter & Sugar, 75 days
- Honey & Cream, 84 days
- G90, 85 days

=== Multicolor su ===
Multicolored varieties are usually at their sweetest when the mature color just starts to "blush" on the kernels.

- Hookers, 70 days (open pollinated, white turning blue at maturity)
- Triple Play, 70 days (open pollinated, white-yellow bicolor turning partially blue at maturity)
- Painted Hill, 75 days (open pollinated, mostly white turning various pastels at maturity)
- Black Mexican/Aztec, 76 days (heirloom, open pollinated, white turning blue-black at maturity)
- Double Red, 80+ days (open pollinated, white turning dark red at maturity)

== Sugary Enhanced (se) ==
Contains even more sugars in relation to starch than su types, and as such is able to retain sweetness for 2 to 4 days with proper refrigerated handling. Somewhat less hardy than su types, it is known as a "tender" kernel and as such does not lend itself to mechanical handling. Does not require isolation from su pollen, although it is preferred. Some seed catalogs don't distinguish the heterozygous se (one se parent) and homozygous se (two se parent) varieties, but if they do, the homozygous se varieties will be labeled either se+, (se se) or SE.

=== Yellow se ===
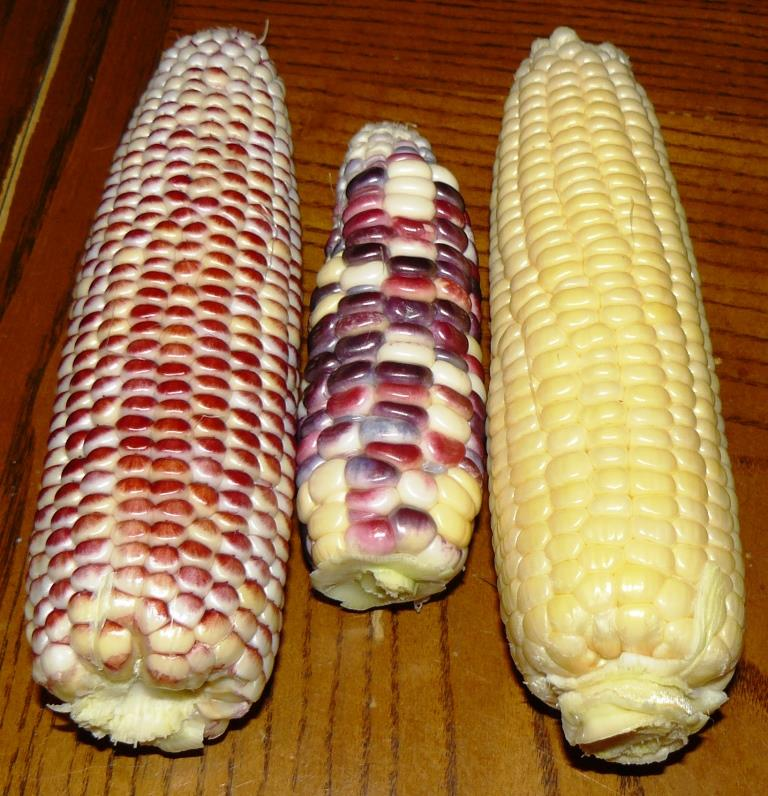
The husked ears of three cultivars: pictured left to right are 'Ruby Queen' (discontinued), 'Painted Hill' and 'Bodacious'.

- Buttergold, 63 days
- Spring Treat, 67 days
- Sugar Buns, 72 days
- Kandy King, 73 days
- Bodacious R/M, 75 days
- Incredible, 83 days
- Miracle, 84 days
- Kandy Korn EH, 89 days

=== White se ===
- Spring Snow, 60 days
- Sugar Pearl, 73 days
- Whiteout, 73 days
- Cloud Nine, 77 days
- Silver King, 82 days (se version of Silver Queen)
- Argent, 86 days

=== Bicolor se ===
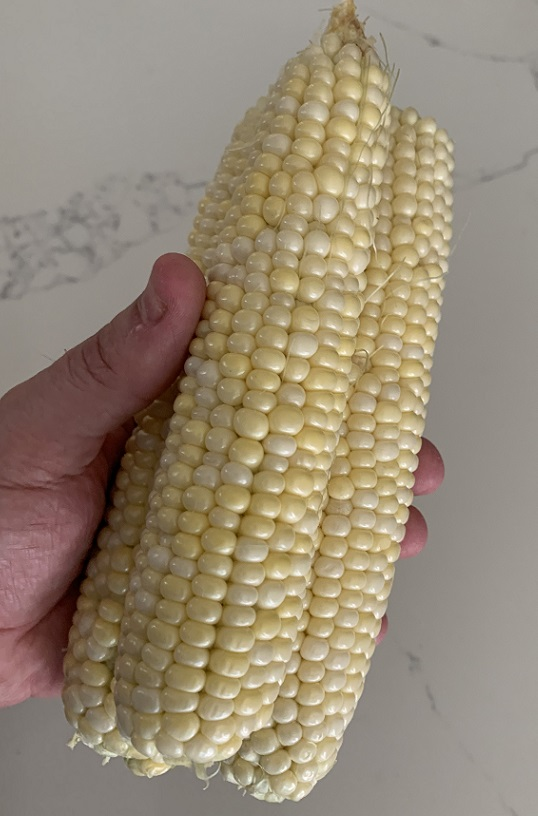
Three ears of 'Silver N Gold' Sweet Corn

- Silver N Gold, 60 days
- Sugar Baby, 65 days
- Bon Jour, 70 days
- Trinity, 70 days
- Bi-Licious, 72 days
- Temptation, 72 days
- Luscious, 73 days
- Ambrosia, 75 days
- Who Gets Kissed?, 78+ days (open pollinated)
- Precious Gem, 80 days
- Peaches and Cream Mid EH, 83 days
- Delectable R/M, 84 days

== Supersweet (sh2) ==
Supersweet or shrunken-2 types have four to ten times the sugar content of normal sugar (su) types and with proper handling is able to be stored for up to 10 days. Less hardy than even se types, requiring higher germination temperatures, precise planting depth and isolation from all other corn pollen for optimum results. The name derives from the shrunken, shriveled appearance of the dried kernel which is low in starch.

=== Yellow sh2 ===
- Extra Early Super Sweet, 67 days
- Takeoff, 69 days
- Early Xtra Sweet, 70 days (1971 AAS winner)
- Summer Sweet Yellow, 74 days
- Krispy King, 78 days
- Challenger, 80 days
- Passion, 81 days
- Jubilee SuperSweet, 83 days
- Crisp ‘N Sweet, 85 days
- Damaun, 85+ days (open pollinated)
- Illini Xtra Sweet, 85 days
- WIM, 80 days

=== White sh2 ===
- Summer Sweet White, 73 days
- Treasure, 83 days
- How Sweet It Is, 85 days (1986 AAS winner)
- Camelot, 86 days

=== Bicolor sh2 ===
- Summer Sweet Bicolor, 73 days
- Honey ‘N Pearl, 78 days (1988 AAS winner)
- Aloha, 82 days
- Dazzle, 82 days
- Hudson, 83 days
- Phenomenal, 85 days

== Synergistic (sy) ==
Synergistic varieties combine differing genetics on the same ear. The first varieties developed of this type have 25% sh2, 25% se and 50% su kernels on the cob but now different combinations are possible. There is an increasing number of brand names and trademarks that cover specific genetic combinations under this general type. However, a common trait of all sy types is that isolation from other su and se varieties pollinating at the same time is not required, though isolation may still be recommended for maximum sweetness.

=== Yellow sy ===
- Applause, 72 days
- Inferno, 73 days
- Gold Standard, 76 days
- Honey Select, 79 days (2001 AAS winner)

=== White sy ===
- Illusion, 72 days
- Mattapoisett, 80 days
- Avalon, 82 days (White version of Providence)

=== Bicolor sy ===
- Sweetness, 68 days
- Pay Dirt, 70 days
- Revelation, 70 days
- Synergy, 76 days
- Montauk, 80 days (Delectable type)
- Kristine, 80 days (Cinderella type)
- Serendipity/Providence, 82 days
- Cameo, 84 days (Delectable type)

== Augmented Supersweet ==
Varieties of the augmented supersweet type combine multiple gene types on top of sh2. These varieties have 100% of the kernels containing the sh2 gene, but also have se and su genes in some portion of the kernels.

The augmented supersweet varieties have tender kernels like the se varieties. Therefore, mechanical picking is not recommended.

As with other supersweets, these varieties must be isolated from su, se and sy types pollinating at the same time to prevent starchy kernels.

=== Yellow ===
- Vision, 75 days

=== White ===
- Xtra-Tender 3473, 73 days
- Devotion, 82 days

=== Bicolor ===
- Kickoff XR, 69 days
- Anthem XR, 73 days
- Xtra-Tender 2573, 73 days
- Xtra-Tender 274A, 74 days
- Fantastic XR, 75 days
- Triumph, 75 days
- American Dream, 77 days (2018 AAS winner)
- Obsession, 79 days
- Xtra-Tender 282A, 82 days

=== Multicolor ===
- Wild Violet, 75 days (purple-white bicolor)

== See also ==
- International Code of Nomenclature for Cultivated Plants
