= Wet-milling =

Wet-milling is a process in which feed material is steeped in water, with or without sulfur dioxide, to soften the seed kernel in order to help separate the kernel's various components. For example, wet-milling plants can separate a 56-pound bushel of corn into more than 31 pounds of cornstarch (which in turn can be converted into corn syrups or corn ethanol), 15 pounds of corn gluten meal for use in animal feed, and nearly 2 pounds of corn oil.

== See also ==
- Corn steep liquor
- Corn wet-milling
