= Pastel de choclo =

Traditional South American corn dish

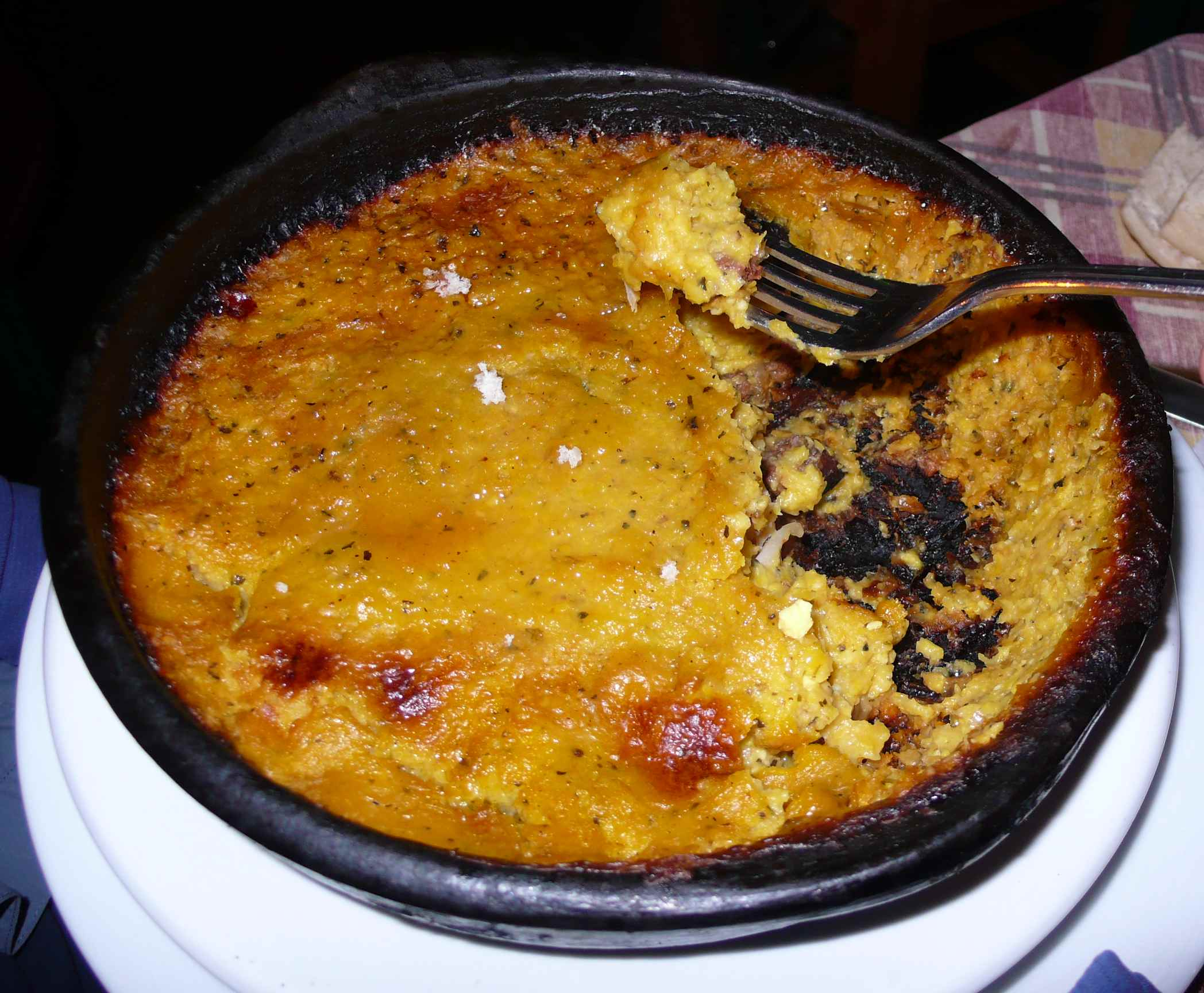
- Pastel de choclo for individual portions
- Type: Pie
- Course: Main
- Region or state: South America
- Main ingredients: Crust: Mashed sweet corn, Filling: ground beef, chicken, raisins, black olives, onions, or slices of hard boiled egg

Pastel de choclo ("corn pie" or "corn cake") is a South American dish made from sweetcorn or choclo. It is similar to the pastel de elote found in Mexican cuisine and to the English corn pudding. The filling usually contains ground beef, chicken, raisins, black olives, onions, or slices of hard boiled egg. It is traditional in the cuisines of Argentina, Bolivia, Chile, Colombia, Ecuador, Paraguay, Peru, and Uruguay. An early Chilean description of a dish corresponding to pastel de choclo appeared in Claudio Gay's 1862 Historia física y política de Chile: Agricultura, which described a filling of minced lamb, sometimes mixed with chicken, covered with ground corn seasoned with sugar, fat, chili and other condiments.

== Preparation ==
Pastel de choclo is prepared with sweetcorn ground into a paste. It is then seasoned with ground basil that is blended into the corn. The mixture is pre-cooked with milk and a little lard and used as a topping for the filling. The filling, known as "pino", contains minced beef cooked with onions, paprika, other spices, and sometimes chicken, is also used as a filling for traditional Chilean empanadas. The pino is laid in the bottom of the paila with slices of hard boiled egg, olives and raisins.

== In popular culture ==
The Argentinian poet Florencio Escardó wrote the following ode to pastel de choclo, published in 1876:

Y ya lo creo!
¿Habrá cosa mas rica que una humita en chala?
¿Qué les parece á ustedes una mazamorra con leche que haya sido traída desde cinco leguas en el tarro, del lechero?
Y díganme con franqueza, ¿hay cosa mas deliciosa que un pastel de choclo?
¡Si es cuento largo el enumerar las cosas ricas que se hacen con el maiz!

And I believe it!
Is there anything tastier than a humita in a corn husk?
And what do you all think about a milky pudding which has been brought from five leagues away in the milkman's jug?
And tell me frankly: is there anything more delicious than a pastel de choclo?
Enumerating those tasty things made with corn is indeed a long story!

== See also ==
- List of maize dishes
- List of porridges
