= Peruvian corn =

Large-kernel variety of field corn from the Andes

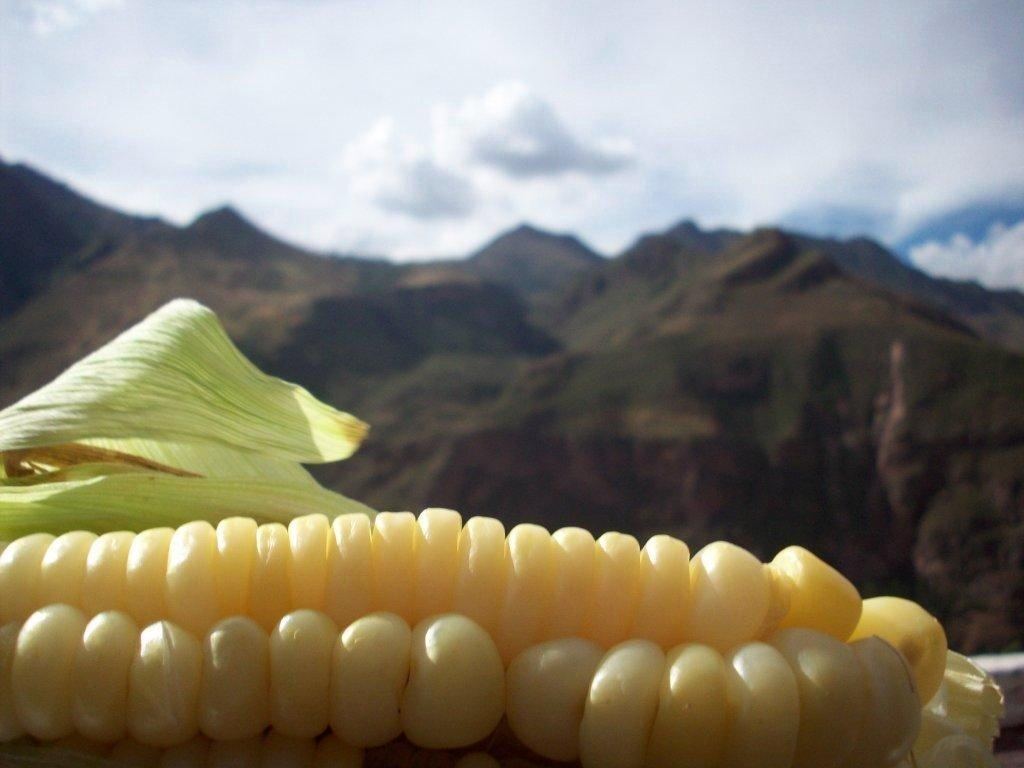
Peruvian corn, referred to as choclo in Spanish

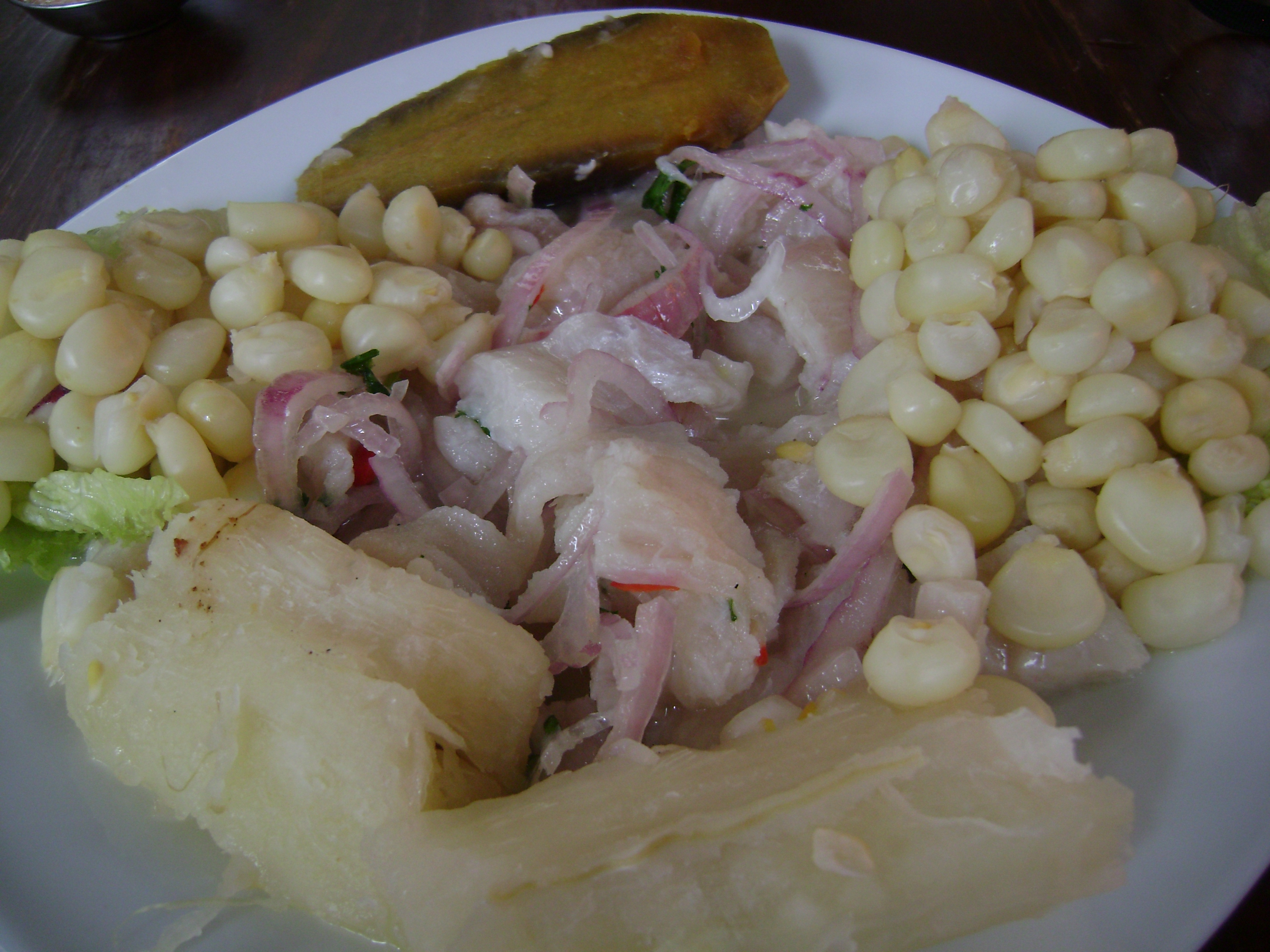
Ceviche lenguado (Sole) with boiled choclo

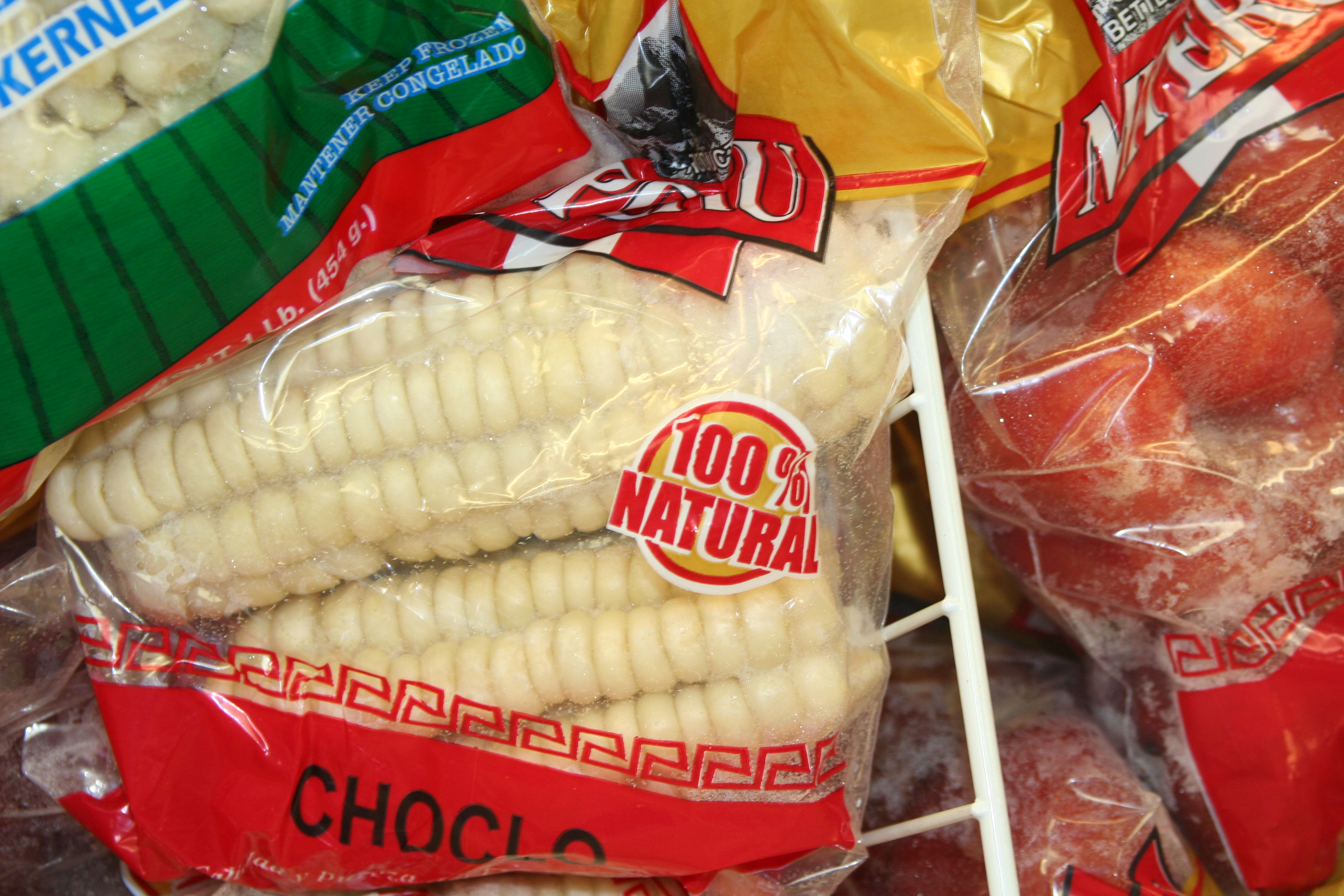
Peruvian choclo

Choclo, also referred to as Peruvian corn or Cuzco corn (after Cuzco, the capital city of the Inca Empire), is a large-kernel variety of field corn from the Andes. It is consumed in parts of Central America and South America, especially in Ecuador, Peru, Bolivia and Colombia. Choclo may also refer to common corn in Argentina, Chile and Uruguay.

Choclo can be eaten raw when the ears are young, or cooked when the ears are more mature. It has a milder flavor compared to other varieties of field corn, and is better suited for human consumption. When compared to sweet corn, the kernels are larger and chewier and have a starchy, hefty texture, rather than a sweet taste. The taste and appearance are somewhat similar to hominy.

Choclo is used in the making of humitas in Bolivia, choclo arepas in Colombia and for pastel de choclo. Peruvian corn is often white in color.

The word choclo derives from the Quechua word choccllo and has since taken on a broader context within the Spanish language, often being used to refer to cobs of corn in general.

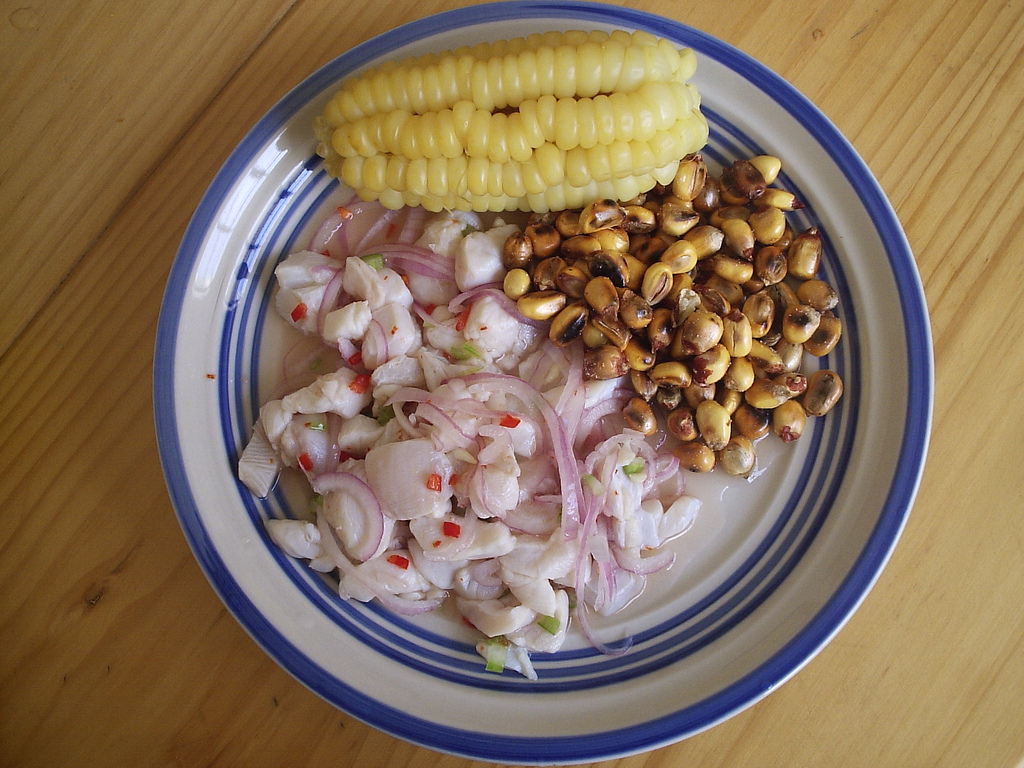
"Toyo" (shark) ceviche from Peru with choclo and cancha

In Peru, choclo is commonly served as an accompaniment to dishes such as ceviche, and its toasted, salted form, similar to corn nuts, are customarily given free to restaurant patrons upon being seated. Full ears of choclo are also a popular street food in Peru and other Andean countries, typically served with a slice of cheese as choclo con queso.

While flavors vary greatly, finger foods like choclo con queso mirror the popularity of corn on the cob as a convenient street snack in Latin America.

== See also ==
- Peruvian cuisine
- Chicha morada
- Elote
