= How Sweet It Is =

How Sweet It Is may refer to:

== Film ==
- How Sweet It Is!, a 1968 American comedy film
- How Sweet It Is (2013 film), an American musical comedy-drama film

== Music ==
- How Sweet It Is (Jerry Garcia Band album), 1997
- How Sweet It Is (Joan Osborne album), 2002
- "How Sweet It Is (To Be Loved by You)", a song by Marvin Gaye, 1964; covered by many artists
- "How Sweet It Is", a song by Judie Tzuke from The Cat Is Out, 1985
- "How Sweet It Is", a song by Michael Paynter, 2011

== Other uses ==
- "How sweet it is!", a catchphrase used by Jackie Gleason
- How Sweet It Is!: From the Cotton Mill to the Crows' Nest, a 2010 autobiography by Bob Harris
- How Sweet It Is, a sweetcorn variety
