= Corn wet-milling =

Method of breaking down corn kernels

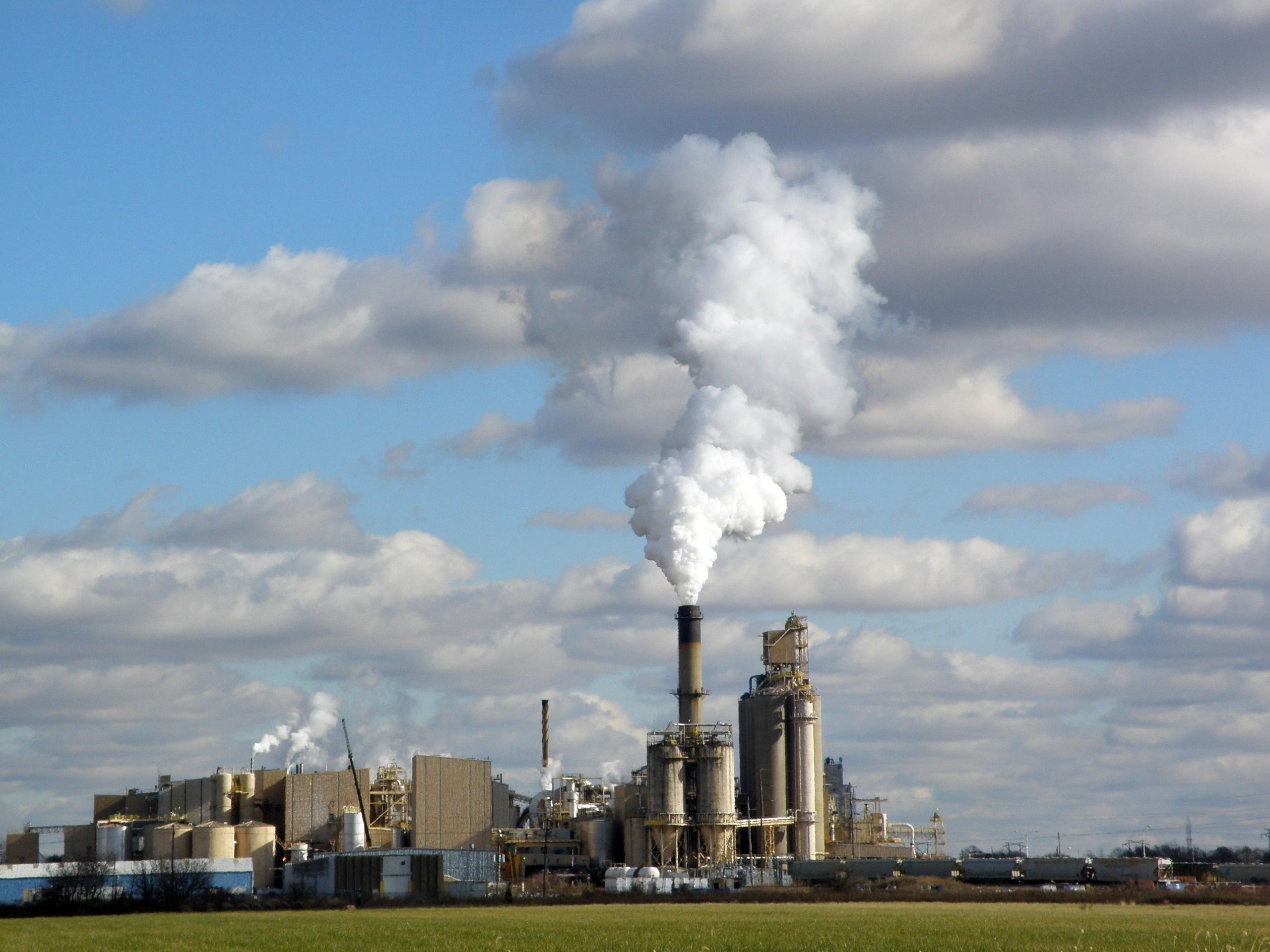
A corn wet-milling facility in Lafayette Indiana operated by A.E. Staley Manufacturing Company.

Corn wet-milling is a process of breaking corn kernels into their component parts: corn oil, protein, corn starch, and fiber. It uses water and a series of steps to separate the parts to be used for various products.

== History ==
The corn wet-milling industry has been a primary component of American manufacturing for more than 150 years. Corn refiners established the process of separating corn kernels into their component parts to produce a variety of value-added products. Oil, protein, starch, and fiber are the primary products of the corn wet-milling process. The Associated Manufacturers of Products from Corn was formed in 1913 when a group of corn refining magnates allied themselves.

== Description ==
Corn wet-milling is a process where components of corn kernels are extracted to produce a highly purified product. Most of the products from this process are valuable and mainly required by the food industry. Through this process, every part of the corn is useful to produce the quality ingredients. The characteristics of this process are based on physical separation of components, mostly by weight and size. Water is needed as it is a wet process and it works as separation/carrier agents in washing steps. Therefore, this process can be considered as having high capital cost. The corn is soaked in a aqueous sulfur dioxide solution to soften the kernel so that the oil in the germ will not contaminate other products and is easy to separate.

== Process steps ==
=== Cleaning ===
As per the standards of the U.S. Department of Agriculture, Grade 5 corn is usually used for wet-milling. Harvested corn has to be cleaned before it is milled. A Dockage tester with the appropriate sieve number is used to remove particles other than the required grain, such as cob pieces, foreign seeds, metal pieces, leaves, and dirt, so that the percentage of dockage contained can be calculated. The cleaned corn is then analyzed for its composition using a near-infrared spectrometer (NIRS). The compositional analysis of yellow dent corn carried out at the Center for Crops Utilization Research, Iowa State University, is recorded in the table below.

NIRS Compositional Properties
Moisture (in %)	Protein (in %, dry basis)	Oil (in %, db)	Starch (in %, db)	Density (in g/cc)	Test Weight (in lb/bu)
13.8	8.93	4.29	70.4	1.282	65.6

=== Steeping ===
In this process, the corn is hydrated in order to loosen starch granules from the protein matrix while leaving the germ resilient to milling. This process reduces the germ density and softens the kernel, making the milling easy. Chemicals like sulphur dioxide and lactic acid are also added to the water. Lactic acid breaks down the endosperm protein matrix and helps in better separation of starch. It also lowers the pH, preventing growth of microbes. SO_{2} reacts with the disulphide bonds and weakens the matrix, allowing starch granules to separate out cleanly. It also serves as an anti-microbial. At the end of steeping, the protein matrix is weakened, endosperm proteins are solubilized and some soluble solids diffuse out into the steepwater. The clean corn is steeped in large tanks with water at 125-130˚F containing lactic acid and sulphur dioxide for nearly 40 hours. The steepwater is then drained using appropriately sized mesh screens and concentrated using multiple effect evaporators. Use of concentrated steepwater: This extract is protein-rich and can be used as nutrient media for fermentation to produce enzymes or antibodies. It is also used in animal feed.

=== Germ recovery ===
As the process step suggests, in this step the germ is separated from the other parts of the corn. Recovering the germ as intact as possible is necessary to prevent any oil contamination in the final products. Attrition mills such as disk mills are used to coarsely grind the softened corn kernels. The grinding is slow and the elements used to grind are blunt to ensure intact removal of germ. Water is added to the ground material to make a thick slurry of macerated kernels and whole germ. The 40-50% crude oil content of germ makes it less dense than other particles and as a result germ floats in the mixture. The mixture is then passed through germ hydrocyclones with an over- and underflow. Overflow will be composed majorly of germ and water and underflow will have fiber, starch, protein and water. The overflow is passed through the hydrocyclone multiple times since 100% separation cannot be achieved in a single pass. The separated germ is cleaned, dried and passed through a germ press to extract oil from it. Solvent extraction can also be used alternatively. The solid particles remaining after oil extraction is called germ meal which is further dried.

Germ meal is a good source of amino acids and is a carrier of micro-ingredients in animal food formulations. The refined corn oil can be used as salad oil and cooking oil. It is also used to prepare corn oil margarines.

=== Fiber recovery ===
The underflow from the hydrocyclone consisting of fiber, protein and starch is finely ground and screened using multiple grind mills and pressure-fed screens. Screens are used to separate the fiber from the mixture. Various screen sizes are used to remove coarse and fine fibers. A wedge bar or profile bar screen is used. Starch and protein passes through the screen and collected whereas the fibers remain on the screen and it is called corn gluten feed. The principle of separation is difference in size. The corn gluten feed has approximately 21% protein, 1% fat and 10% fiber and 15% starch. Since it is high in water-soluble nutrients, it is used as one of the main ingredients in animal feed. It can also be used to produce refined corn fiber to be used for human consumption.

=== Protein recovery ===
The slurry containing just the protein and starch is called millstarch. Water is removed from the millstarch in a thickener before moving it into a separator. Centrifugal forces are applied to separate starch and gluten which differ in density. The heavier starch slurry is then washed multiple times in hydrocyclones with fresh water. The starch stream typically has 90% starch and the gluten stream consists of 60% protein. The lighter gluten, separated out from the top, is thickened and the heavy gluten is further sent for dewatering into vacuum rotary filter. This corn gluten meal consists of approximately 60% protein, 1% fat and 3% fiber. The process water from both the processes are either added to steepwater or removed. Since it has around 60% protein, it is used as animal feed and zein products.

=== Starch processing ===
Starch goes through multiple-stage washing using hydrocyclones. The supernatants are separated at each washing stage. The water from each stage is recycled to the previous hydrocyclones to ensure the maximum amount of starch is separated. A very high purity of starch (>99.5% db) can be recovered by wet-milling. Purity is important when the end product is high-fructose corn syrup or starch to be modified (using chemicals or enzymes) but it is not important during ethanol production. After centrifugation and washing, the starch is dried.

=== Co-product manufacture ===
Co-products account for 34% of wet-milled yield. In fact, 23% of corn that is processed has very low or no value. The fiber, concentrated steepwater and germ meal are mixed to produce corn gluten feed. As mentioned before, corn gluten meal is also used as animal feed. Although both have ‘gluten’ in the name, no gluten protein is present in them – there is none in corn on whole.

A typical solid yield (on db) data for yellow dent corn is shown in the table below.

Fraction	Yield on dry basis (in %)
Starch	58–68
Gluten meal	5.8-15.4
Fiber (coarse+fine)	8.8-19.2
Germ	5.2-10.5
Steepwater solubles	5.1-7.5
Total solids recovery	97.3-99.9

== Primary products ==
The wet-milling process will have five major products: steep water solids, germ, fiber, starch, and gluten. However, the co-product from this process will produce corn oil, corn gluten meal, corn germ meal, corn gluten and feed steep water. The average of one bushel of corn generally will have about 32 lb of starch or 33 lb sweeteners or 2.5 gallons of fuel ethanol and 11.4 lb gluten feed and 3 lb gluten meal and 1.6 lb corn oil.

== Research ==
Though corn wet-milling has been used for years to produce food, animal feed, and fuel, researchers continue seeking efficiencies. For example, one study showed that steeping time can be decreased from 40 hours to 6–8 hours, if enzymes like protease are added and if milling is done in two stages. This method eliminates sulphur dioxide and yields the same amount as the conventional process. Another study, showed that adding cellulase and an enzyme to degrade phytic acid reduces steeping time. In the conventional process, the corn's phytic acid largely ends up in the corn steep liquor. Yet another study tried decreasing the initial moisture content and increasing the drying air temperature but obtained reduced yields because low water content impeded separating protein from starch.

== See also ==
- Maize
