= Pod corn =

Variety of maize

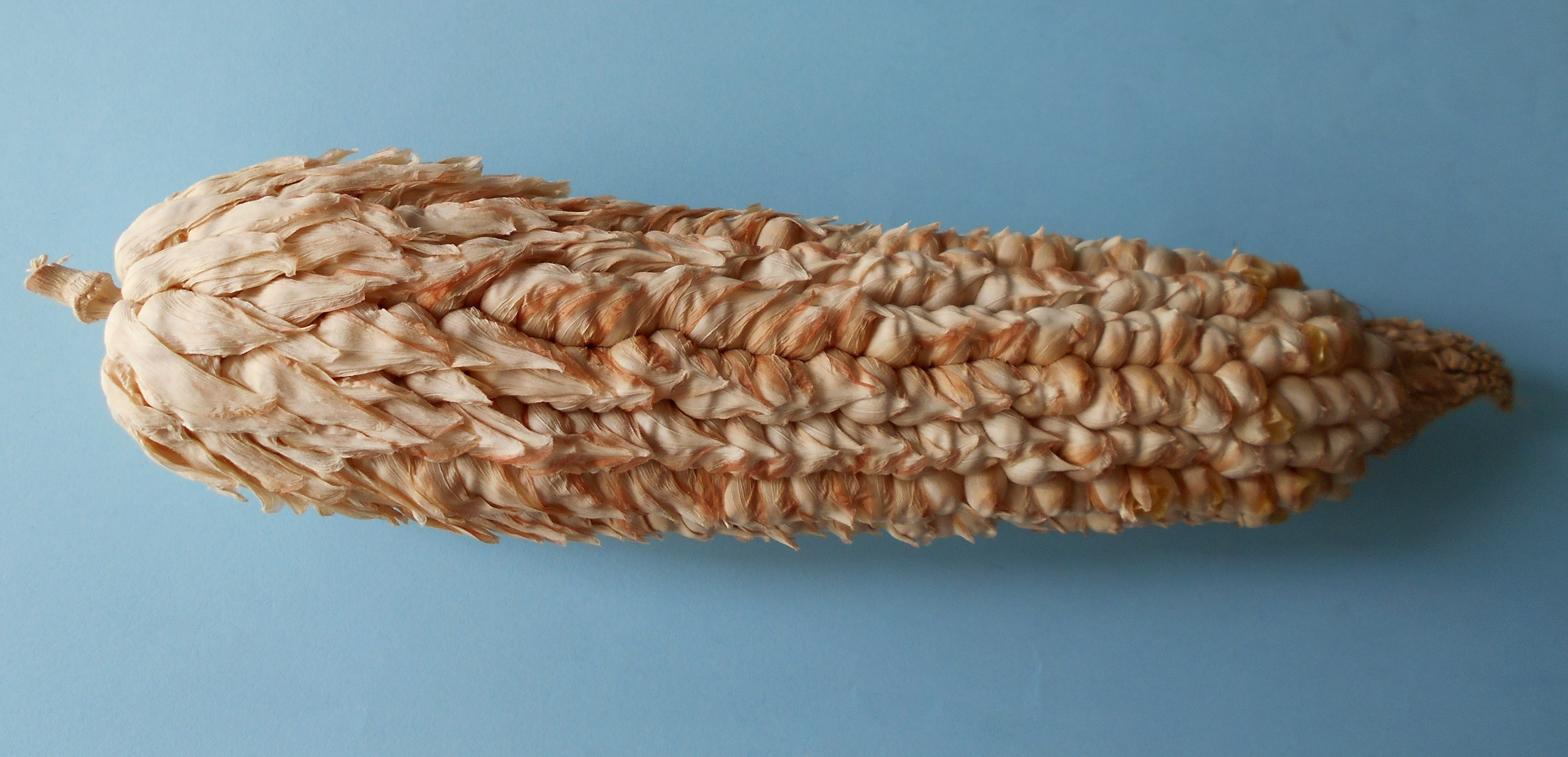
- Species: Zea mays
- Variety: Zea mays var. tunicata

Pod corn or wild maize is a variety of corn (maize). It is not a wild ancestor of maize but rather a mutant that forms leaves around each kernel.

Pod corn (tunicata Sturt) is not grown commercially, but it is preserved in some localities.

Pod corn forms glumes around each kernel which is caused by a mutation at the Tunicate locus. (Note: More specifically, a gene ordinarily relating only to vegetative portions of the plant, called ZMM19, was apparently duplicated (in pre-Columbian times), leading to expression of the leafy sheath at the plant's inflorescences.Wingen, L. U., Munster, T., Faigl, W., Deleu, W., Sommer, H., Saedler, H., & Theissen, G. (2012), "Molecular genetic basis of pod corn (Tunicate maize)", Proceedings of the National Academy of Sciences, 109 (18), University of Wisconsin, Madison, WI: PNAS: 7115–7120, Bibcode:2012PNAS..109.7115W, doi:10.1073/pnas.1111670109, PMC 3344968, PMID 22517751) Because of its bizarre appearance, pod corn has had a religious significance to certain Native American tribes.

The six major types of corn are dent corn, flint corn, pod corn, popcorn, flour corn, and sweet corn.
