= Corn silk =

Shiny fibres at the tip of an ear of corn

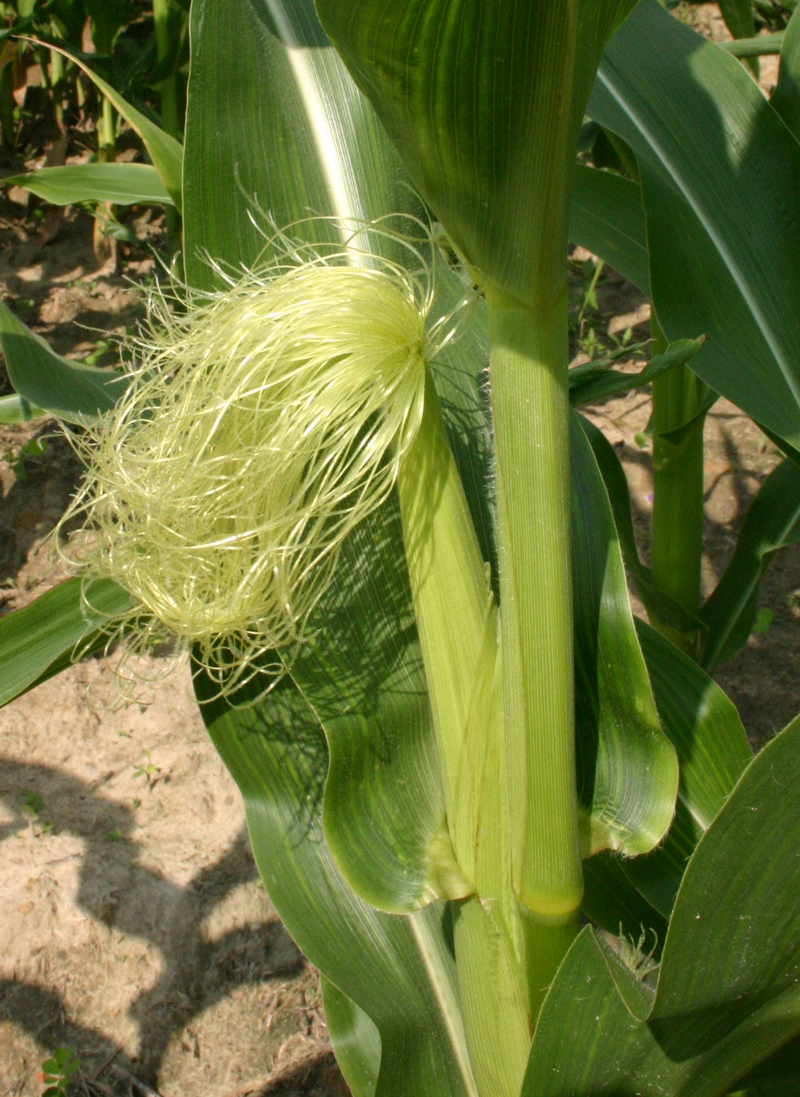
Corn silk on a corn flower

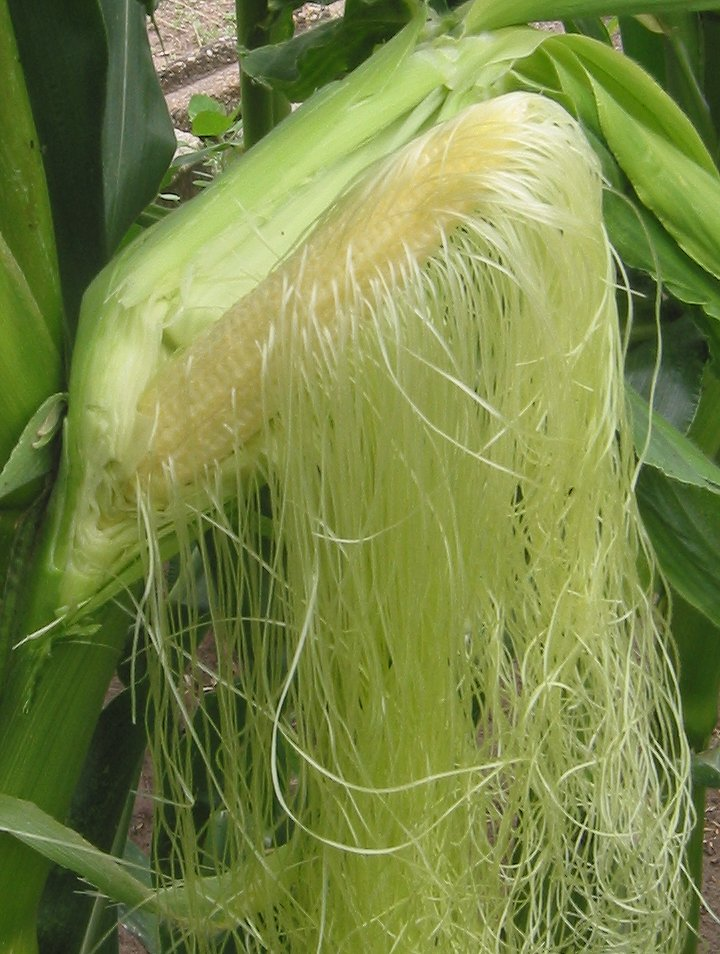
Corn silk on a growing ear of corn

Corn silk is a common name for Stigma maydis, the shiny, thread-like, weak fibers that grow as part of ears of corn (maize); the tuft or tassel of silky fibers that protrude from the tip of the ear of corn. The ear is enclosed in modified leaves called husks. Each individual fiber is an elongated style, attached to an individual ovary. The term probably originated sometime between 1850 and 1855.

== Development ==
Up to 1000 ovules (potential kernels) form per ear of corn, each of which produces a strand of corn silk from its tip that eventually emerges from the end of the ear. The emergence of at least one strand of silk from a given ear of corn is defined as growth stage R1, and the emergence of silk in 50% of the plants in a corn field is called "mid-silk". The silk lengthens from the basal ovules during the 10 to 14 days previous to growth stage R1; this is due to a change of shape of existing cells rather than their replication. The elongation progresses at 1.5 inches per day at first but gradually slows as the full length is approached. Elongation of a corn silk strand stops soon after a grain of pollen is captured or due to senescence of the silk 10 days after its emergence.

If an ovule is successfully fertilized, the corn silk will detach from it two or three days later. Otherwise, the silk will remain attached indefinitely, and fertilization remains possible (with decreasing chances of success) for 10 days after silk emergence. For this reason, it is possible to sample developing ears of corn from a field, husking them gently with a sharp knife, then shaking them to assess the progress of pollination based on how much of the corn silk falls away.

== Function ==
Corn silk is part stigma and part style, providing a female flower surface to which pollen grains can adhere and defining the path through which the pollen must travel. The stigma is the very tip of the corn silk, which has a larger number of hairs to help pollen to adhere to it. Kernel formation in the cob requires pollination of the external corn silk by wind or insects. Usually several grains of pollen adhere, but only one will successfully participate in fertilization of the ovule to form a corn kernel.

For the pollen grain, the male gametophyte, to transmit its genetic material to the ovule, it must germinate and form a pollen tube that extends down nearly the full length of the corn silk strand. Typically 400 to 600 kernels are successfully formed in this way. The pollen tube extends at a rate of over 1 centimeter per hour, requiring only 24 hours to create a foot-long pathway within the intercellular space of the corn silk through which the sperm cells (the gametes) pass to join the female gametophyte within the ovule. The pollen tube is produced by the single vegetative cell in the pollen grain, which passes its cytoplasm, nucleus and two sperm cells into the tube. The tube extends itself at the apex only, in an actin polymerization dependent process, and the direction in which the apex progresses responds to cyclic AMP levels, including cAMP cyclization by a pollen signalling protein (PSiP).

Corn silk can control the types of pollen that an ear of corn will accept through expression of certain forms of the Gametophyte Factor 1 gene. Many races of popcorn, of the everta type, will greatly slow the development of pollen tubes from any pollen that does not carry a similar form of Ga1-S or Ga1-M, thereby preventing the ingression of genes (natural or engineered) from other types of corn. The popcorn remains free to donate its genes via its own pollen to other types of corn. The effectiveness of this restriction can be measured by planting the popcorn beside purple dent corn; the xenia effect would cause the formation of purple aleurones if kernels permitted themselves to be fertilized by pollen from outside the group. Organic farmers are pursuing the transfer of some of these mechanisms into non-popcorn strains for purposes of preventing inadvertent pollination by GMO corn, which under U.S. regulations can cause their product to be rejected as organic corn, and for which they have no recourse against GMO growers.

== Pathology ==
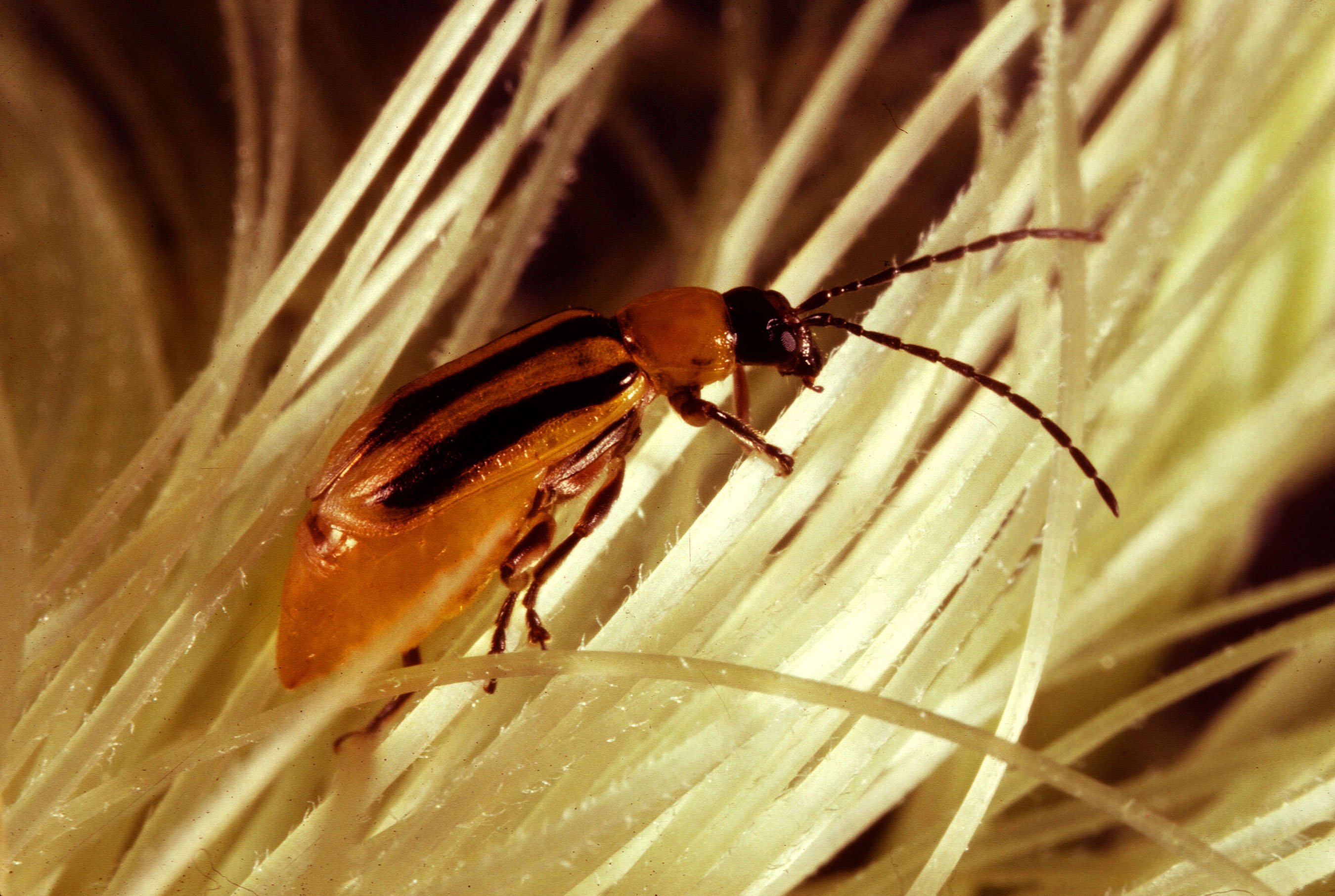
In its adult stage, a Western corn rootworm searches for pollen on corn silk. This insect can be a cause of silk clipping.

The moisture of freshly emerged corn silk sometimes attracts insects, which can cause silk clipping, which can interfere with kernel formation.

== Applications ==
Corn silk contains a variety of pharmacologically active compounds and as such is used in many types of folk medicine, including as a diuretic and as an inhibitor of melanin production.

In many studies, corn silk has been claimed to have antioxidant and healthcare properties, as well as acting as a diuretic agent that reduces hyperglycemia and works as an antidepressant and anti-fatigue agent. Corn silk is also used in teas and supplements for treating urinary problems. Antioxidant and hematoprotective effects of corn silk protein hydrolysate have been found in vitro. Potential antioxidant peptides in the hydrolysate have also been identified.

== See also ==
- Inflorescence
