= Field corn =

North American term for maize

Field corn is a North American term for maize (Zea mays) grown for livestock fodder (silage and meal), ethanol, cereal, and processed food products. The principal field corn varieties are dent corn, flint corn, flour corn (also known as soft corn), which includes blue corn (Zea mays amylacea), and waxy corn.

Field corn primarily grown for livestock feed and ethanol production is allowed to mature fully before being shelled off the cob and being stored in silos, pits, bins, or grain "flats". Part of it is used to make corn syrup, especially with dent corn. Field corn can also be harvested as high-moisture corn, shelled off the cob and piled and packed like silage for fermentation; or the entire plant may be chopped while still very high in moisture, with the resulting silage either loaded and packed in plastic bags, piled and packed in pits, or blown into and stored in vertical silos.

== Uses ==
Large-scale applications for field corn include:

- Livestock fodder, whether as whole cobs (for hogs only), whole or ground kernels, or (after chopping and ensilage) the entire above-ground portion of the unripe plant
- Cereal products including corn flour, corn meal, hominy, grits, nixtamal, tortillas, corn bread, and cold breakfast cereals (such as corn flakes).
- Other processed human-food products including corn starch, corn oil, corn syrup, and high-fructose corn syrup.
- Alcohols such as ethanol, butanol, and isobutanol, and ethanol-based alcoholic drinks such as corn whiskey.
- Adhesives, plastic, gels, and thickeners from starch

In some parts of Latin America and Mexico, field corn consumption far exceeds that of sweet corn. In the United States, field corn is not generally regarded as desirable for human food without commercial pre-processing. An exception is "roasting ears", similar in appearance to corn on the cob, although it is necessarily roasted (rather than boiled or steamed as is usual with sweet corn), and is neither tender nor sweet even after the roasting. A variety of field corn is also commonly eaten in Andean South America and is known as Cuzco corn.

== Wet mills ==
Field corn is processed for its various uses in what are known as "wet mills". These types of mills are different from traditional mills in that they take apart a cob of corn and process its various parts into products for consumption. The yellow skin of the kernel, for example, is separated from the dark germ, which is essentially the seed. While the yellow skin is usually used to produce nutritional supplements and vitamins, the germ is used to produce oil. The endosperm, which is the largest part of a corn kernel, has the most uses. Its carbohydrate molecules are taken apart to produce the organic compounds used in many products. Examples of these organic compounds include citric and lactic acid, glucose, fructose, and ethanol.

Cargill and Archer Daniels Midland are the two largest corn processing companies in the United States.
