= Corn steep liquor =

By-product of corn wet-milling

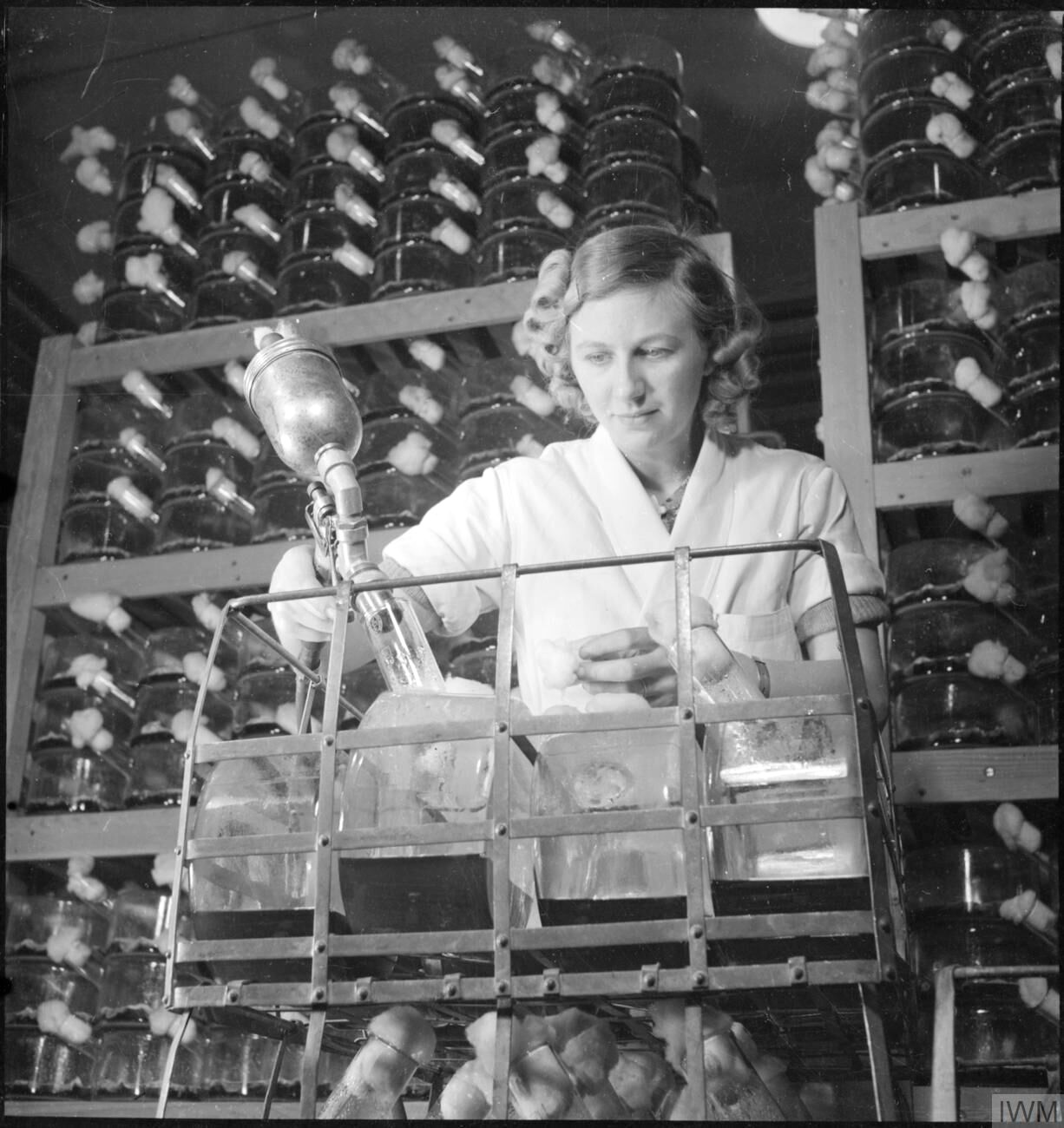
A worker in a penicillin factory inoculating flasks of corn steep liquor, 1943

Corn steep liquor is a by-product of corn wet-milling. A viscous brown liquid which contains amino acids, peptides, vitamins and minerals, it is an important constituent of some types of fungus and plant cell culture media. It was used in the culturing of Penicillium rubens during research into penicillin by American microbiologist Andrew J. Moyer. It is an excellent source of organic nitrogen.

Corn steep liquor has CAS number 66071-94-1 and EC Number 266-113-4.
