= Dockage =

Dockage is a factor in the grading of some grains under the official U.S. Grain Standards. Wheat dockage is described as weed seeds, weed stems, chaff, straw, or grain other than wheat, which can be readily removed from the wheat by the use of appropriate sieves and cleaning devices; also, underdeveloped, shriveled and small pieces of wheat kernels removed in properly separating, properly rescreening, or recleaning. The term also may be used to describe the amount of reduction in price taken because of a deficiency in quality.
