= Flour corn =

Variety of corn

- Species: Zea mays
- Variety: Zea mays var. amylacea

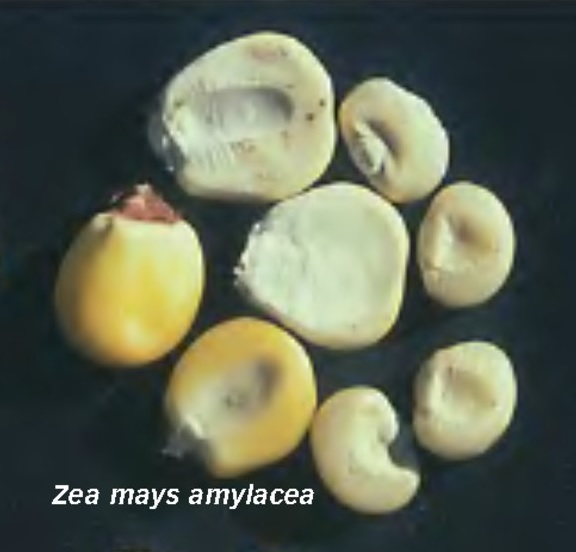
Kernels of Zea mays var. amylacea. The bigger ones are about two times larger in diameter compared to other maize varieties.

Flour corn (Zea mays var. amylacea) is a variety of corn with a soft starchy endosperm and a thin pericarp. It is primarily used to make corn flour. This type, frequently found in Aztec and Inca graves, is widely grown in the drier parts of the United States, western South America and South Africa. The large-seeded corns of Peru, called choclo or Cuzco corn, are used in the preparation of chicha. In South Africa, similar corns are known as mealies.

The six major types of corn are dent corn, flint corn, pod corn, popcorn, flour corn, and sweet corn.
