= Shoepeg corn =

Sweetcorn cultivar

Nutritional value per 2/3 cup of kernels (89g)
- Energy: 100 kcal (420 kJ)
- Carbohydrates: 20g
- Sugars: 5g
- Dietary fiber: 1g
- Fat: 1g
- Protein: 3g
Vitamins and minerals
Vitamins	Quantity %DV^{†}
Vitamin C	4% 3.6 mg
- ^{†}Percentages estimated using US recommendations for adults.

Shoepeg corn is a cultivar of white sweetcorn valued for its sweetness. It is characterized by small, narrow kernels tightly and unevenly packed on the cob. The corn has a sweet, mild flavor. The most common variety of shoepeg corn available today is Country Gentleman.

Shoepeg corn is popular in some regions of the United States, particularly in the South. An early promoter of canned shoepeg corn was Malcolm Mitchell of Maryland—Mitchell's Shoe Peg Sweet Corn is a brand still available today. The brand was owned by F.O. Mitchell & Bro., Inc., which was founded in 1903 by brothers Frederick O. Mitchell and Parker Mitchell Sr. The brand was sold to Hanover Brands, Hanover, PA, in the late 1980s. Although its original center of production was turned into the Aberdeen Proving Ground soon after the U.S. declared war on the Central Powers in April 1917.

The name "shoepeg corn" derives from a shoemaking term used during the 19th century. Shoepeg corn kernels resemble the wooden pegs used to attach soles to the upper part of shoes.

Shoepeg corn is a common ingredient in salads and corn dishes throughout the Southern United States but is relatively unknown in other areas of the country. It is on rare occasions available fresh in some areas, but it is most often canned. Shoepeg corn is also the best variety of corn for Sockeye salmon bait.
