= Dent corn =

Variety of corn

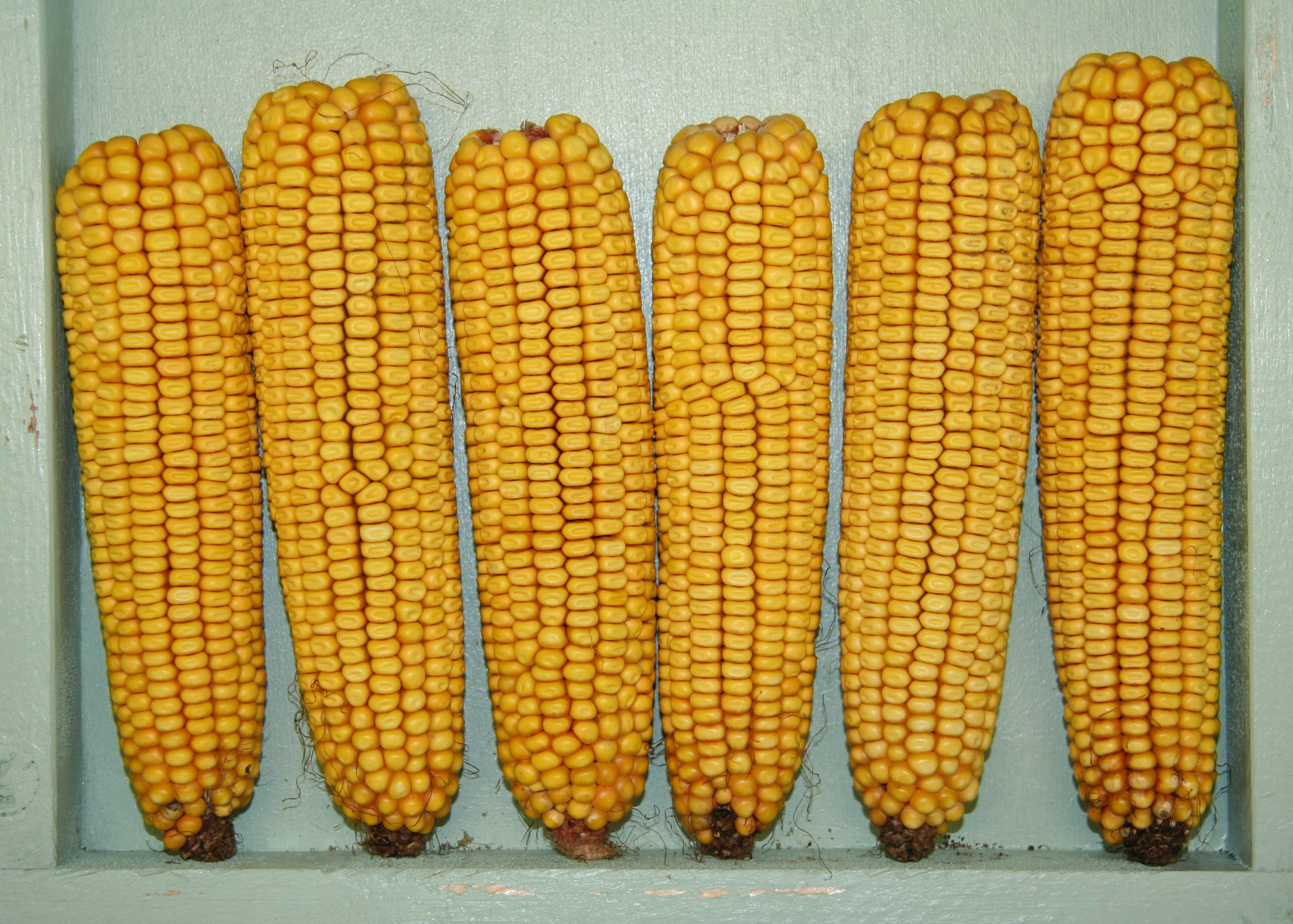
- Dent corn is named for its dented kernels.
- Species: Zea mays
- Variety: Zea mays var. indentata

Dent corn, also known as grain corn, is a type of field corn with a high soft starch content. It received its name because of the small indentation, or "dent", at the crown of each kernel on a ripe ear of corn. Reid's Yellow Dent is a variety developed by central Illinois farmer James L. Reid. Reid and his father, Robert Reid, moved from Brown County, Ohio, to Tazewell County, Illinois, in 1846 bringing with them a red corn variety known as "Johnny Hopkins", and crossed it with varieties of flint corn and flour corn. Most of today's hybrid corn varieties and cultivars are derived from it. This variety won a prize at the 1893 World's Fair.

Most of the corn grown in the United States today is yellow dent corn or a closely related variety derived from it. Dent corn is the variety used in food manufacturing as the base ingredient for cornmeal flour (used in the baking of cornbread), corn chips, tortillas, and taco shells. It is also used to make corn syrup. Starch derived from this high-starch content variety is turned into plastics, as well as fructose which is used as a sweetener (high-fructose corn syrup) in many processed foods and soft drinks.

It is also the primary ingredient (51+%) in Kentucky bourbon whiskey mash bills, and is used to make ethanol for industrial use and motor fuel.

The six major types of corn are dent corn, flint corn, pod corn, popcorn, flour corn, and sweet corn.

== Taxonomy ==
- Zea mays var. indentata, synonym Zea indentata Sturtev., was identified and published by American agronomist and botanist Edward Lewis Sturtevant (1842–1898). It is categorized as a species within the family Poaceae, subfamily Panicoideae, and tribe Andropogoneae—a tribe of grasses that use the NADP–malic enzyme subtype of C_{4} photosynthesis in carbon fixation.

== Description ==
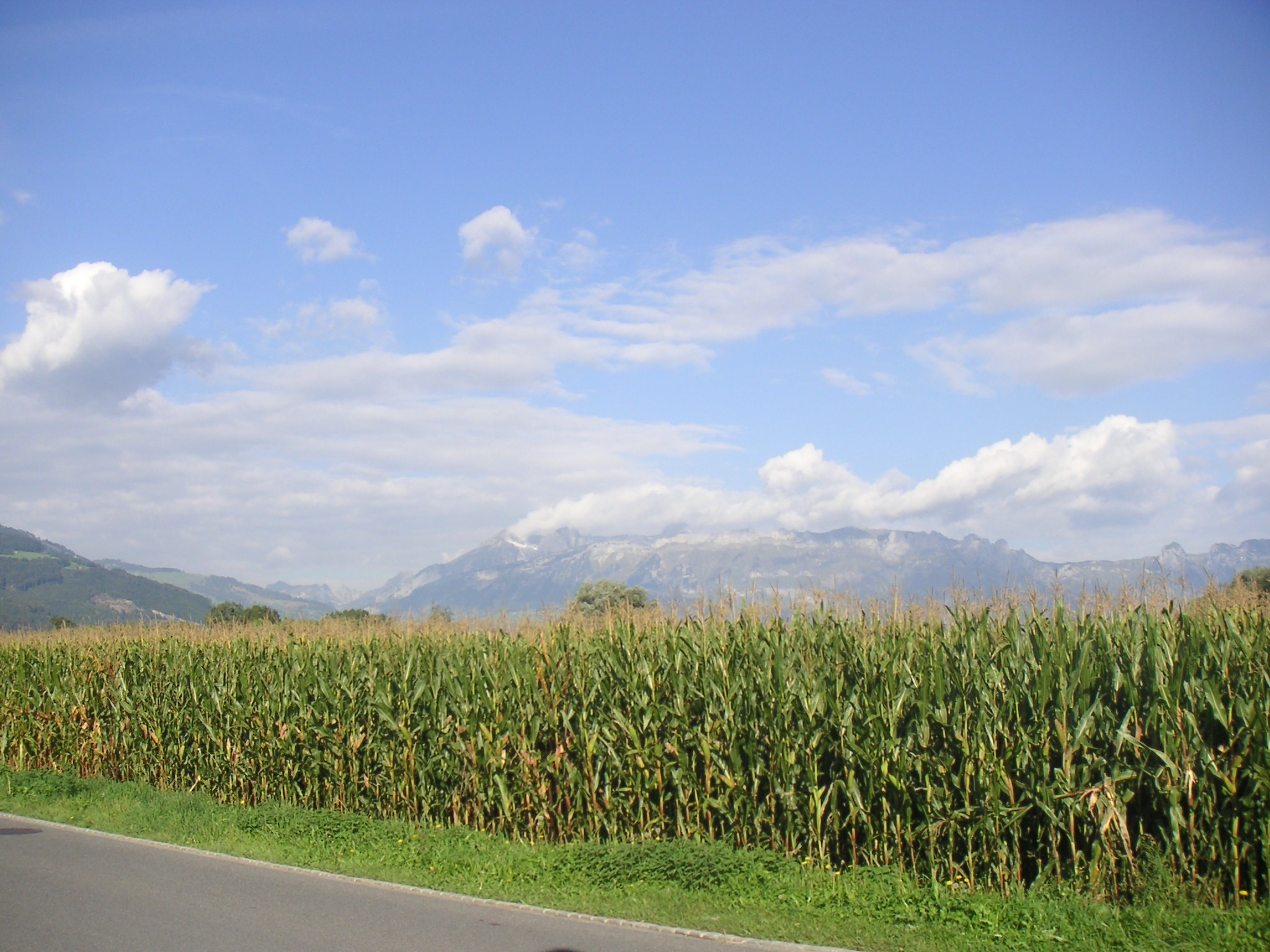
Corn, shown here grown in Liechtenstein, is cultivated as a row crop.

Dent corn (Zea mays var. indentata) is a fast-growing, vertically erect, short-lived annual plant and is similar to many other varieties of Zea mays. More commonly grown to a height of 2–3 meters (6.6–9.8 ft), Zea mays typically grows with a single, hollow main stem often called a stalk (or culm) which exhibits internodes that are cylindrical in the upper part and alternately grooved in the lower part with a bud in the groove. One or occasionally two lateral branches emerge from the leaf axils in the upper part of the plant. The leaves of Zea mays alternate with broad, sword-shaped leaf blades, parallel veins with a prominent mid-rib, and small ligules. The plant has an adventitious, dense, fibrous root system that develops aerial roots at nodes near the soil surface.

The flowers of Zea mays are monoecious and are born in separate parts of the plant. The female flower, or ear, is an inflorescence that develops from axillary bud apices several nodes below the stem apex. The male flower, or tassel, develops from the stem apex. Anthers on the tassel dehisce and release pollen, which is dispersed by the wind (anemophilous). Ears consist of a corncob, or rachis, with rows of sessile spikelets bearing kernels, or caryopses. The corncob and kernels are tightly enveloped by several layers of ear leaves commonly called husks. The kernels vary from variety to variety, and what distinguishes Zea mays var. indentata from other varieties of Zea mays is the small indentation ("dent") that develops at the crown of each kernel. Comparatively, flint corn has a harder-textured, more rounded kernel that may display a slight depression but not a distinct dent.

== Cultivation ==
Dent corn is typically cultivated as a row crop grown commercially for grain and fodder. Cultivars developed for commercial cultivation are either single- or double-cross hybrids bred for special growing areas, soils, or climatic conditions.

== Use ==
According to the U.S. Department of Agriculture's Federal Grain Inspection Service (FGIS), there are two categories of dent corn hybrids—yellow and white. Yellow dent corn is produced primarily for animal feed and industrial uses such as ethanol and cooking oils. FGIS identifies that "white food corn hybrids are dent corn... are typically contracted and sold to dry-mill processors and used in alkaline cooking processes for making masa, tortilla chips, snack foods, and grits" as well as producing food-grade starch and paper. Dependent on their starch content, some yellow dent corn hybrids are grown and used in the production of food for human consumption.

== See also ==
- Corn production in the United States
- Flint corn
- Corn
