= Corn kernel =

Fruit of corn

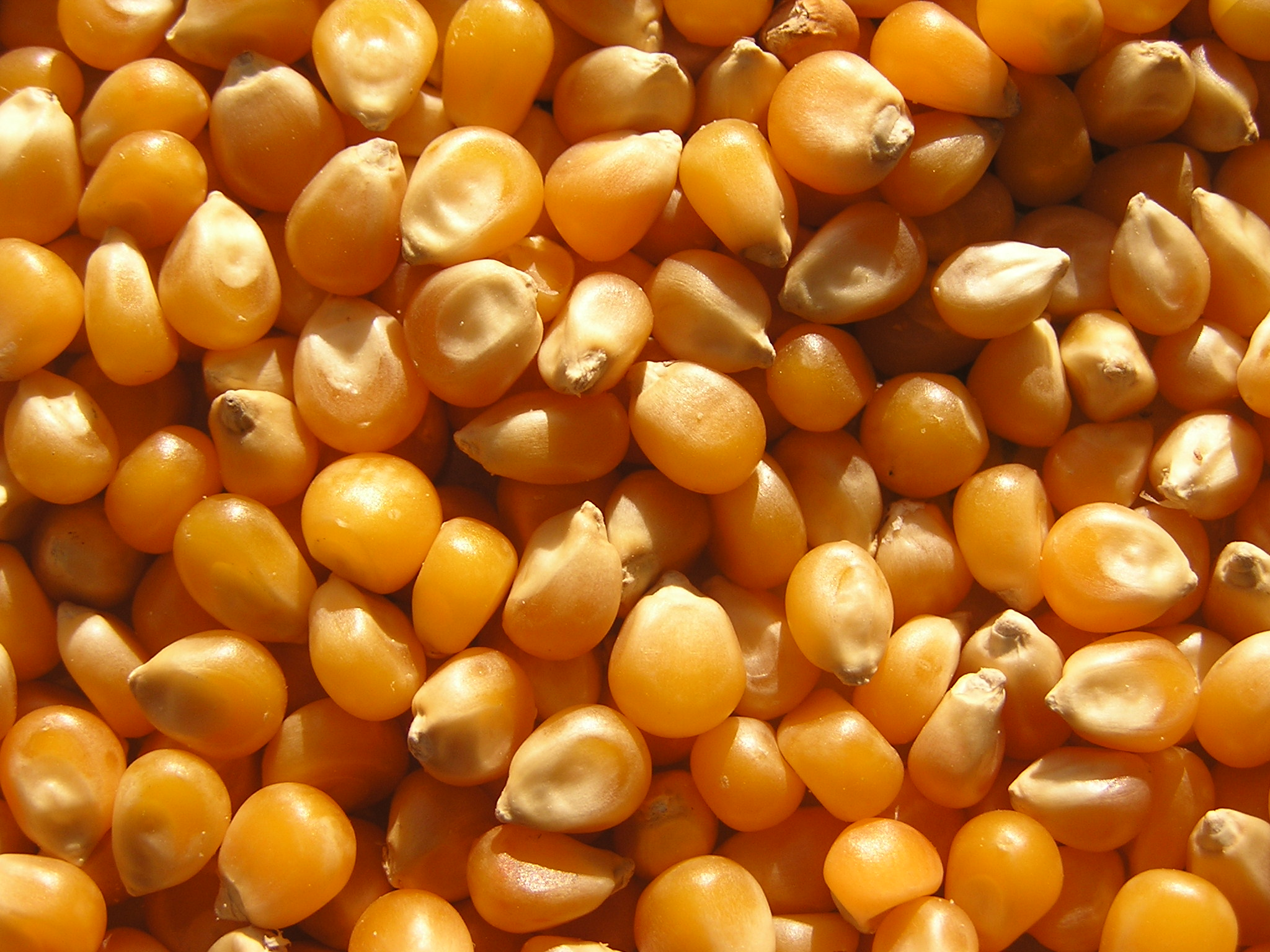
Maize kernels

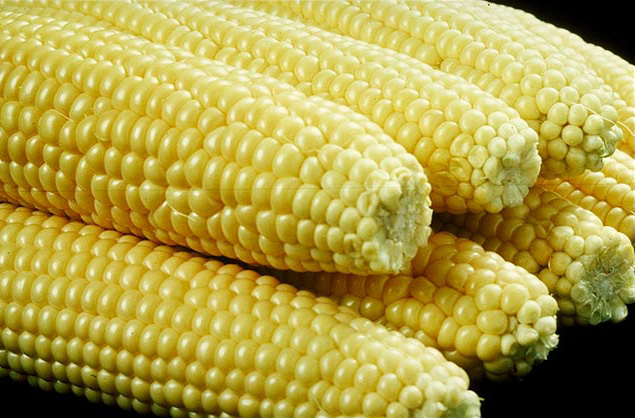
Kernels on the cob

Corn kernels are the fruits of maize (also known as corn). Maize is a grain, and the kernels are used in cooking as a vegetable or a source of starch. A kernel comprises endosperm, germ, pericarp, and tip cap.

One ear of corn contains roughly 800 kernels in 16 rows. Corn kernels are readily available in bulk throughout maize-producing areas. They have a number of uses, including food and biofuel.

== Description ==
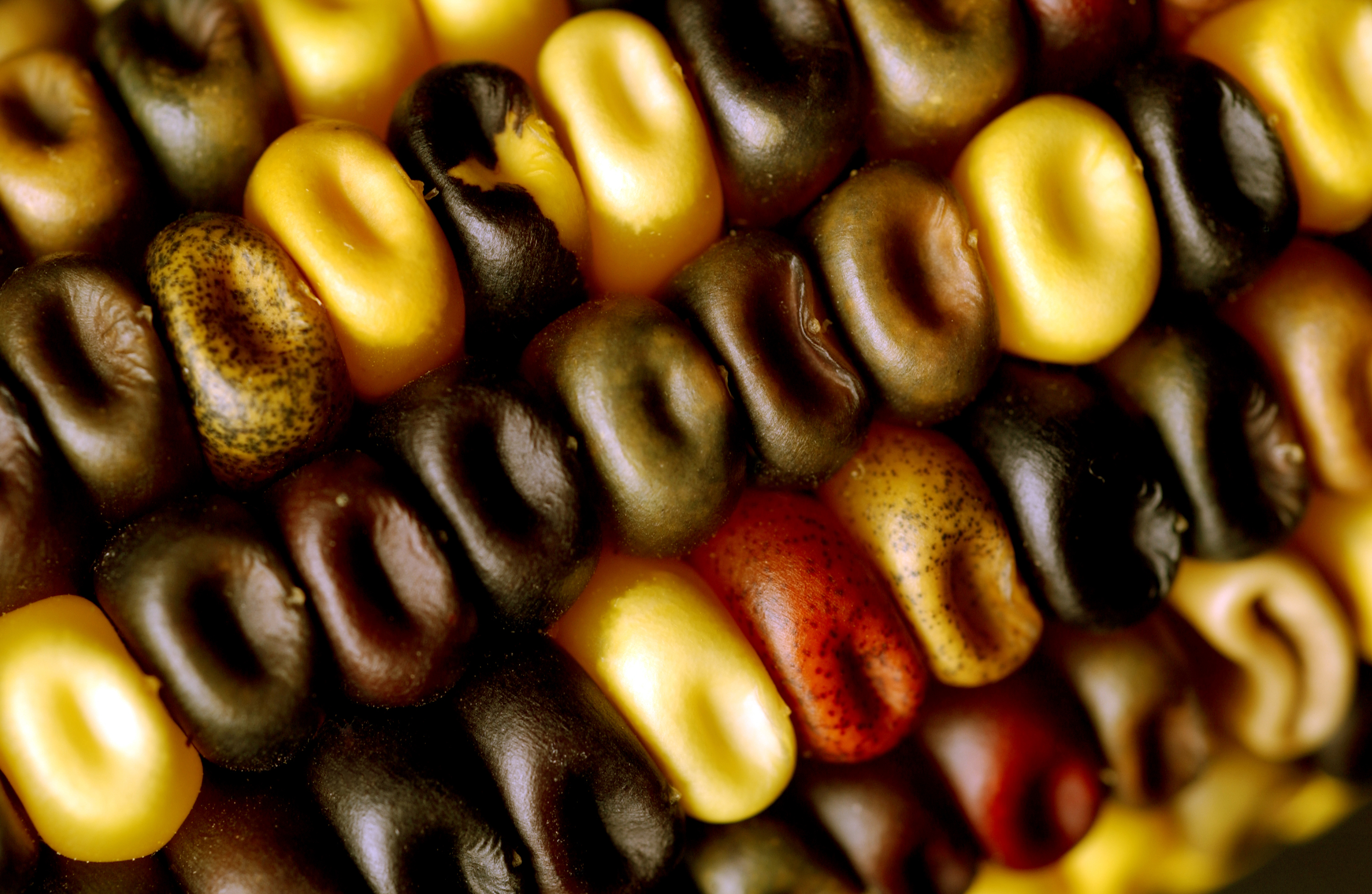
Multicolored kernels on a single corn cob

Corn kernels are the fruits of maize. Maize is a grain, and the kernels are used in cooking as a vegetable or a source of starch. The kernels can be of various colors: blackish, bluish-gray, purple, green, red, white and yellow. One ear of corn contains roughly 800 kernels in 16 rows.

=== Parts ===
The kernel of maize consists of a pericarp (fruit wall) fused to the seed coat. This type of fruit is typical of the grasses and is called a caryopsis. Maize kernels are frequently and incorrectly referred to as seeds. The kernels are about the size of peas, and adhere in regular rows round a white, pithy substance, which forms the ear.

==== Endosperm ====
About 82 percent of the corn kernel's dry weight consists of endosperm. Starch is the primary source and it most widely used part of the kernel. It is known as the key component in fuel, sweeteners, bioplastics and other products.

==== Germ ====
The germ is the only living part of the corn kernel, also called its embryo. It consists of the important genetic information, vitamins, enzymes and minerals for the plant to grow. The germ accounts for 25 percent of the corn oils and it is a valuable part of the kernel.

==== Pericarp ====
The pericarp is the outer covering that protects the kernel and helps to maintain the kernel's nutrient value and moisture content. It is about 91% fiber. If the kernels are wet-milled, most of the pericarp will end up in the feed.

==== Tip cap ====
The tip cap is the attachment point of the kernel to the corn cob, where the nutrient and water flow, and this is the only part that is not covered by the pericarp. It contains fiber.

== Use ==
Corn kernels have a number of uses, including food, biofuel, and bioplastics.

=== Food ===
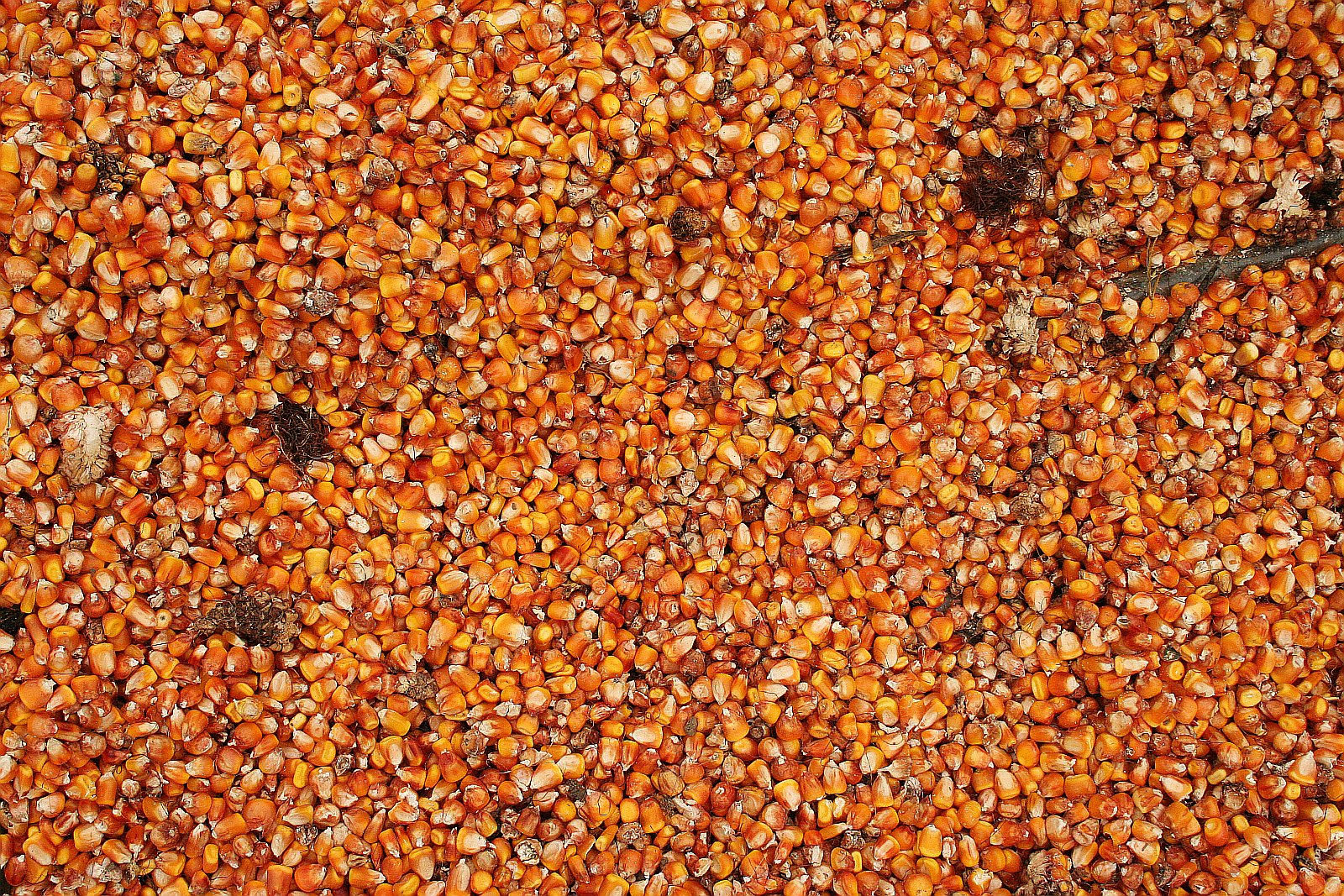
Bulk corn kernels

Corn is a common food throughout the world in many forms. It is used in breakfast cereals in the Western world (as corn flakes) and it is a grain that can be eaten raw off the cob, although it is usually preferred cooked. It may be fed to animals or humans. In the United States, for economic reasons such as government subsidies, corn is the basis of many products, in the form of high fructose corn syrup, in favor of cane sugar. A genetic variant that accumulates more sugar and less starch in the ear is consumed as a vegetable and is called sweet corn.

When ground into flour, maize yields more flour, with much less bran, than wheat does. It lacks the protein gluten of wheat and, therefore, makes baked goods with poor rising capability.

It is also used in popcorn, a common snack in the US.

=== Biofuel ===
Corn kernels are used as pelletized fuel for pellet stoves and furnaces. Corn kernels are a natural pellet, which gives them an economic advantage over other man-made biomass pellets and wood pellets.

The use of corn and other grains as a renewable biofuel may have environmental and cost benefits, compared to other energy sources, and may create additional forms of revenue for farmers and other economic industries. However, the use of corn as a fuel stock may increase the price of corn and have adverse effects on corn as a food stock. In the United States, 5.6 million bushels of corn were used for ethanol production out of 14.6 million bushels produced, according to preliminary 2018 USDA data. According to the U.S. Department of Energy's Alternative Fuels Data Center, "The increased ethanol [production] seems to have come from the increase in overall corn production and a small decrease in corn used for animal feed and other residual uses. The amount of corn used for other uses, including human consumption, has stayed fairly consistent from year to year." This does not prove there was not an impact on food supplies: Since U.S. corn production doubled (approximately) between 1987 and 2018, it is probable that some cropland previously used to grow other food crops is now used to grow corn. It is also possible or probable that some marginal land has been converted or returned to agricultural use. That may have negative environmental impacts. Part of the production increase is also due to higher yields. Achieving higher yields may entail greater use of irrigation, fertilizers, and controversial herbicides.

== See also ==
- Corn wet-milling
