= Sweet corn =

Variety of corn

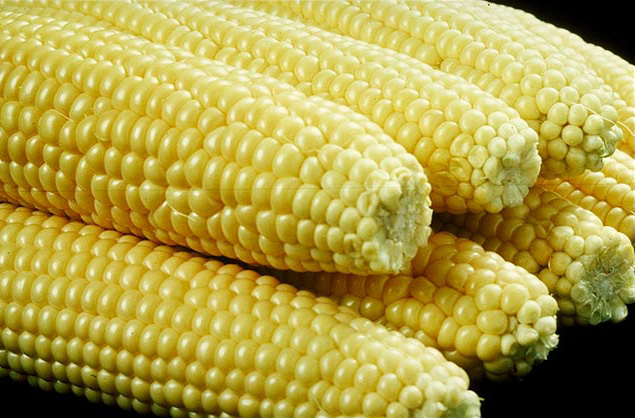
- Husked sweet corn
- Species: Zea mays convar. saccharata var. rugosa
- Origin: United States

Sweet corn (Zea mays convar. saccharata var. rugosa), also called sweetcorn, sugar corn, pole corn, or simply corn is a variety of corn (maize) grown for human consumption with a relatively high sugar content.

Sweet corn is the result of a naturally occurring recessive mutation in the genes which control conversion of sugar to starch inside the endosperm of the corn kernel. Sweet corn is picked when still immature (the milk stage) and prepared and eaten as a vegetable, unlike field corn, which is harvested when the kernels are dry and mature (dent stage). Since the process of maturation involves converting sugar to starch, sweet corn stores poorly and must be eaten fresh, canned, or frozen, before the kernels become tough and starchy.

It is one of the six major types of corn, the others being dent corn, flint corn, pod corn, popcorn, and flour corn.

== History ==
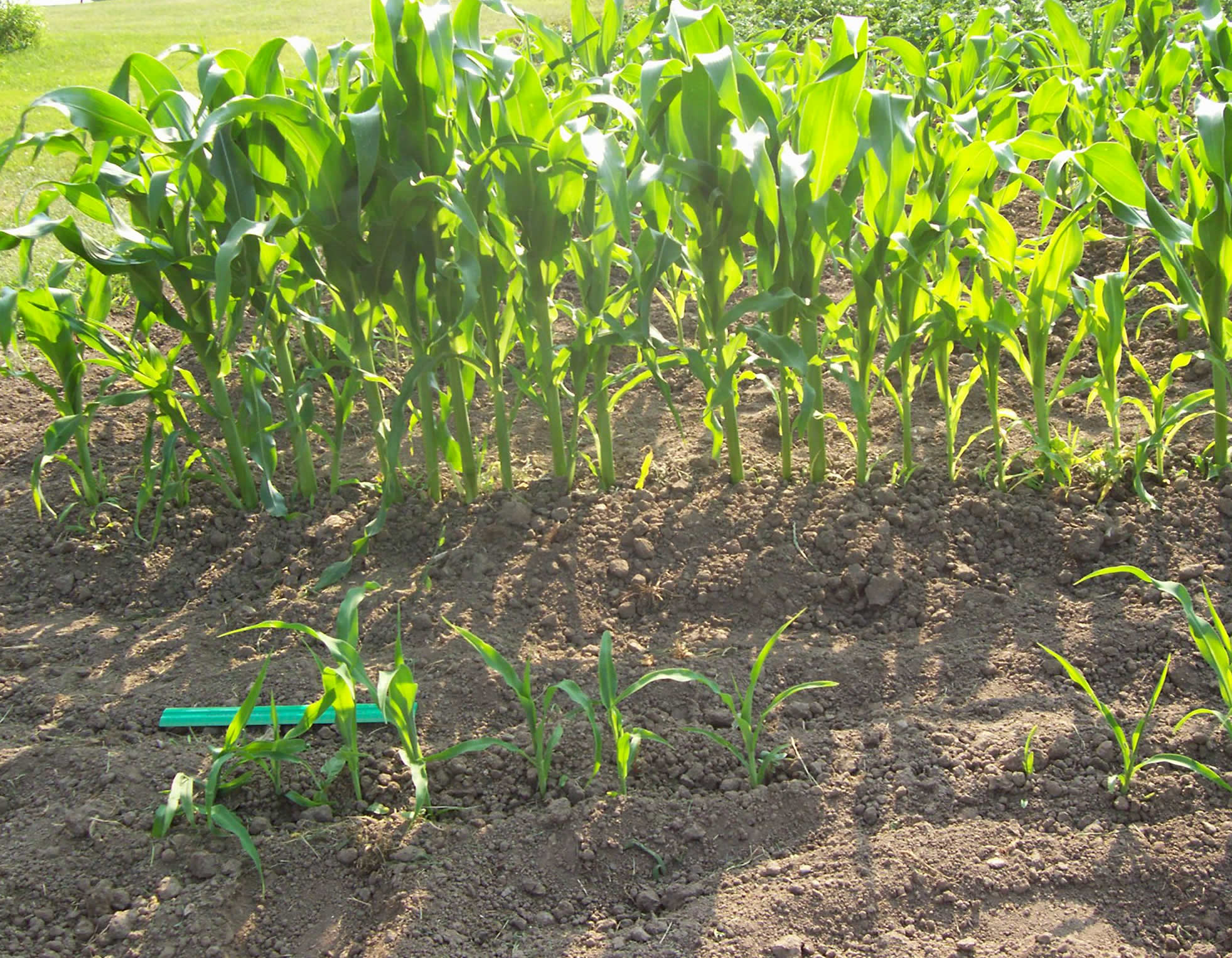
Young sweet corn

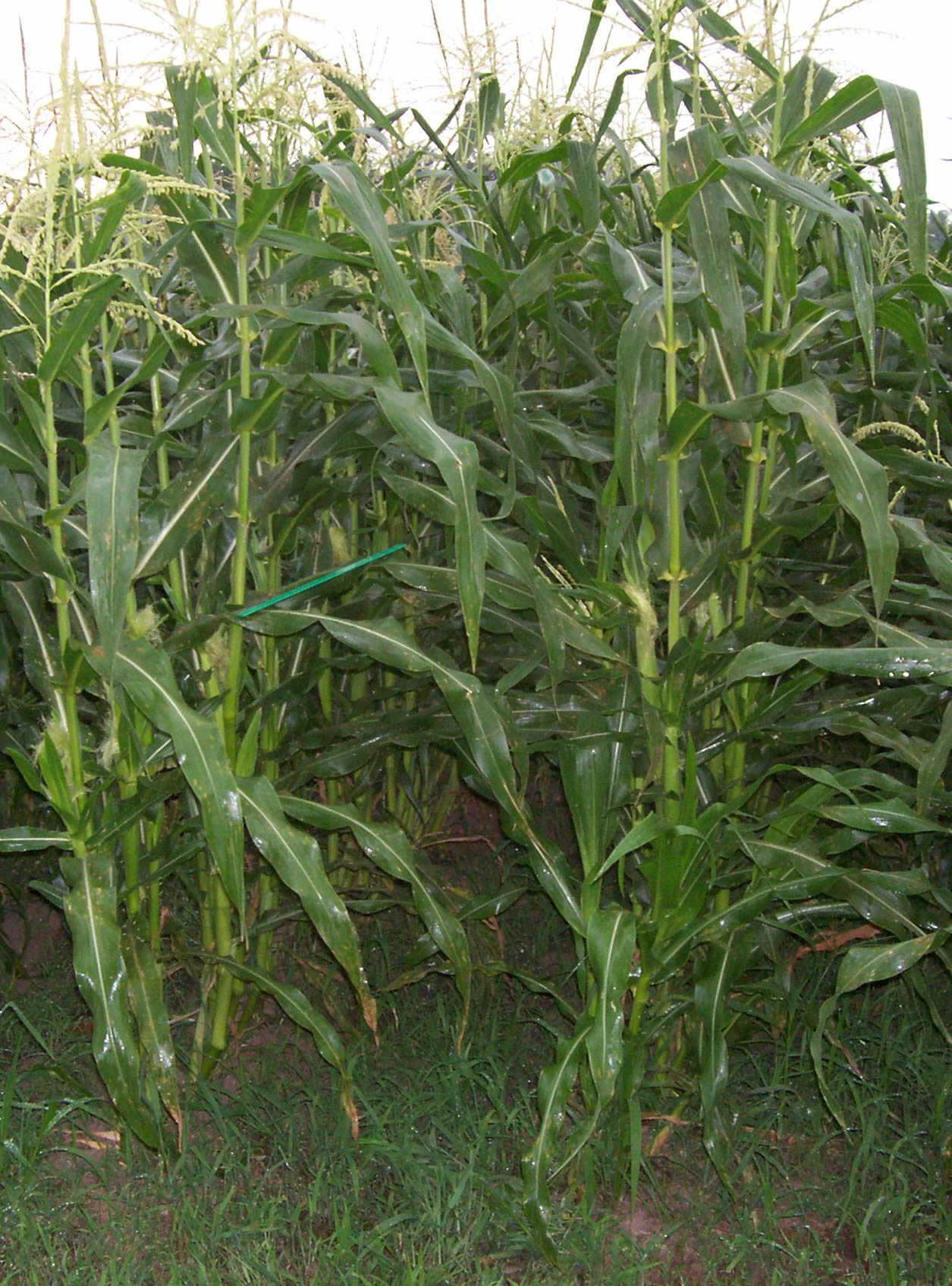
The same rows of corn 41 days later at maturity

In 1493, Christopher Columbus returned to Europe with corn seeds, although this revelation did not succeed due to inadequate education of how to produce corn. Sweet corn occurs as a spontaneous mutation in field corn and was grown by several Native American tribes. The European cultivation of sweet corn occurred when the Iroquois tribes grew the first recorded sweet corn (called 'Papoon') for European settlers in 1779. It soon became a popular food in the southern and central regions of the United States.

Open pollinated cultivars of white sweet corn started to become widely available in the United States in the 19th century. Two of the most enduring cultivars, still available today, are 'Country Gentleman' (a Shoepeg corn with small kernels in irregular rows) and 'Stowell's Evergreen'.

Sweet corn production in the 20th century was influenced by the following key developments:

- hybridization allowed for more uniform maturity, improved quality and disease resistance
  - In 1933 'Golden Cross Bantam' was released. It is significant for being the first successful single-cross hybrid and the first specifically developed for disease resistance (Stewart's wilt in this case).
- identification of the separate gene mutations responsible for sweetness in corn and the ability to breed cultivars based on these characteristics:
  - su (normal sugary)
  - se (sugary enhanced, originally called Everlasting Heritage)
  - sh2 (shrunken-2)

There are dozens of sweet corn cultivars.

== Structure ==
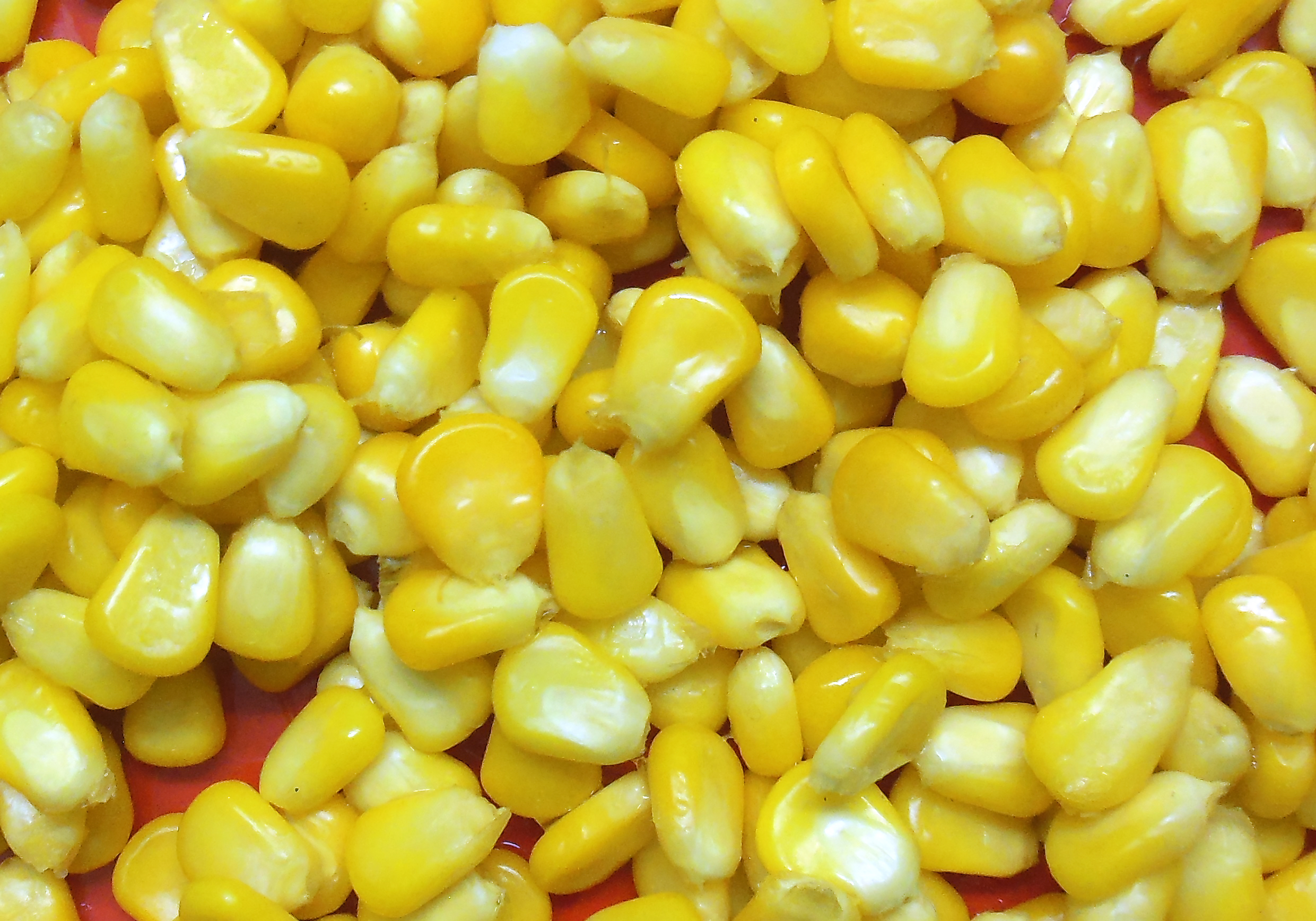
Loose kernels of sweet corn

The fruit of the sweet corn plant is the corn kernel, a type of fruit called a caryopsis. The ear is a collection of kernels on the cob. Because corn is a monocot, there is always an even number of rows of kernels. The ear is covered by tightly wrapped leaves called the husk. Silk is the name for the pistillate flowers, which emerge from the husk. The husk and silk are removed by hand, before boiling but not necessarily before roasting, in a process called husking or shucking.

== Consumption ==
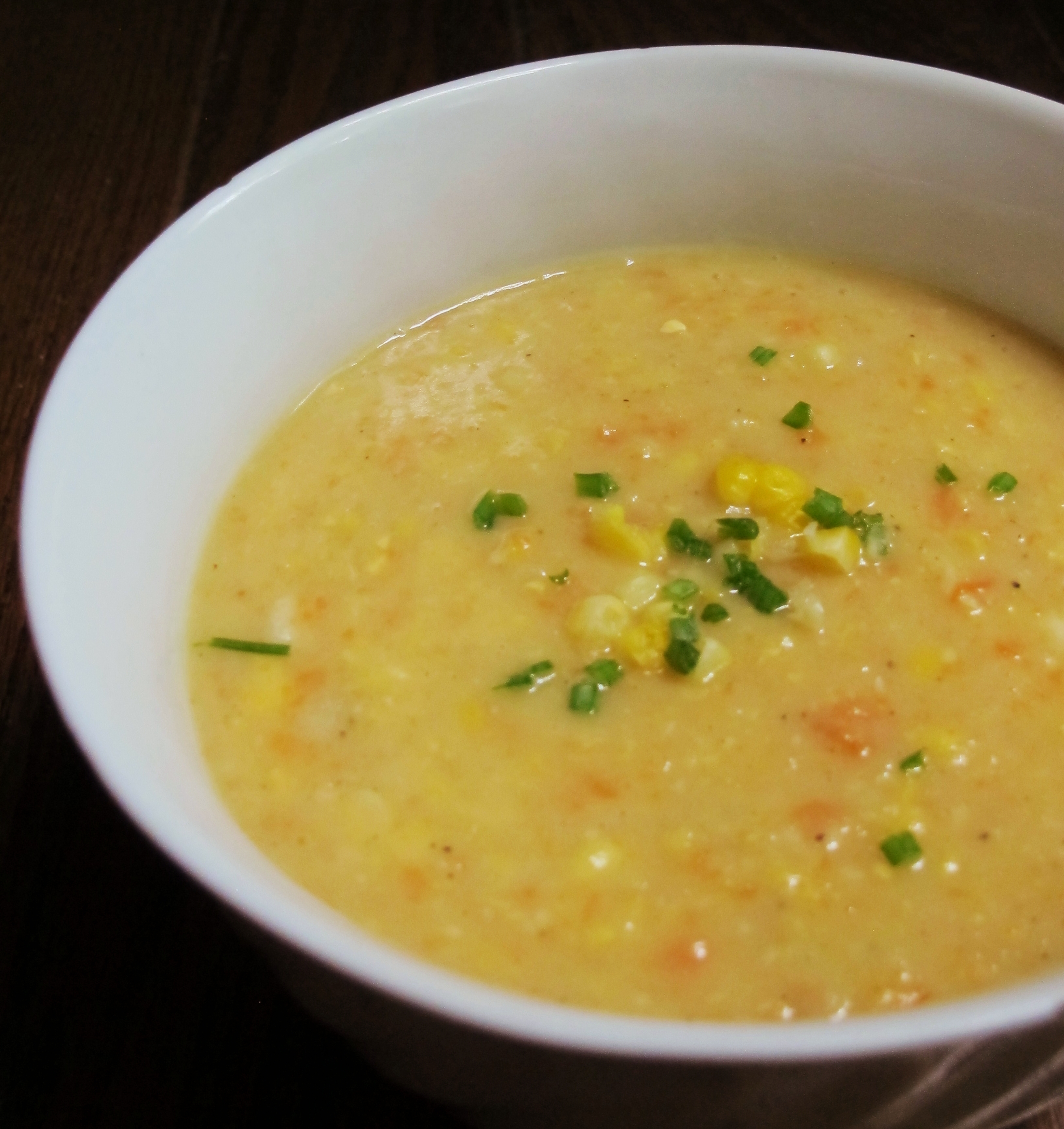
Corn chowder

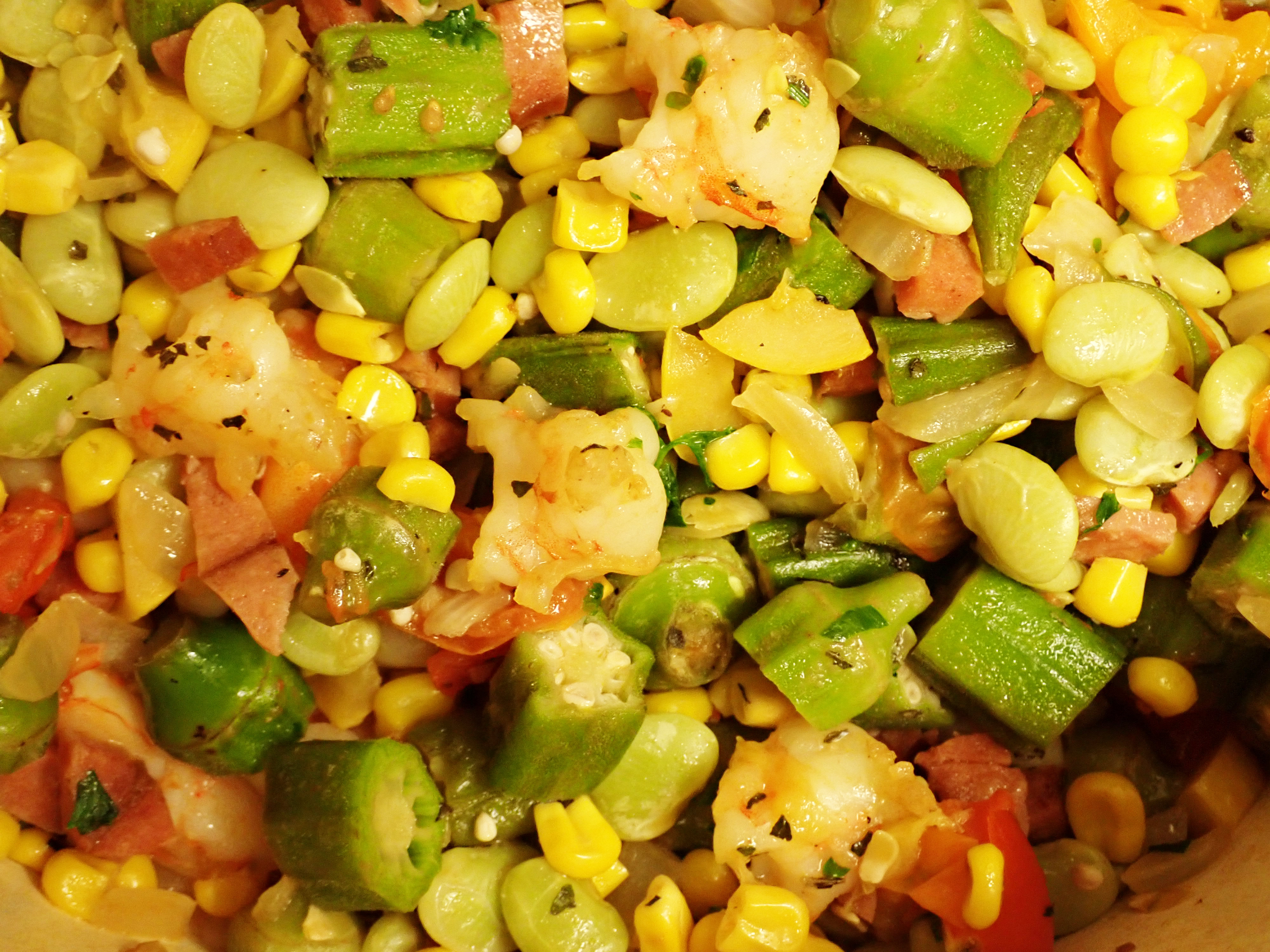
Succotash combines cooked sweet corn, lima beans, and okra

In most of Latin America, sweet corn is traditionally eaten with beans. Although neither corn nor beans alone provides a nutritionally complete amino acid profile, combining them supplies all essential amino acids.

In Malaysia, there exists a variety unique to the Cameron Highlands named "pearl corn". The kernels are glossy white, resembling pearls, and can be eaten raw off the cob, although they are often boiled in water and salt.

In the Philippines, boiled sweet corn kernels are served hot with margarine and cheese powder as an inexpensive snack sold by street vendors.

Similarly, sweet corn in Indonesia is traditionally ground or soaked with milk, which makes available the B vitamin niacin in the corn, the absence of which would otherwise lead to pellagra. Cheese and condensed milk are added to sweet corn in the snack jasuke, short for jagung susu keju.

In Brazil, a combination of ground sweet corn and milk is also the basis of various well-known dishes, such as pamonha and the pudding-like dessert curau, while sweet corn eaten directly off the cob tends to be served with butter.

In Europe and Asia sweet corn is often used as a pizza topping or in salads. Corn on the cob is a sweet corn cob that has been boiled, steamed, or grilled whole; the kernels are then cut off and eaten or eaten directly off the cob. Creamed corn is sweet corn served in a milk or cream sauce. Sweet corn can also be eaten as baby corn. Corn soup can be made adding water, butter and flour, with salt and pepper for seasoning.

In the United States, sweet corn is eaten as a steamed vegetable or on the cob, and is usually served with butter and salt. It can be found in Tex-Mex cooking in chili, tacos, and salads. Corn mixed and cooked with lima beans is one form of succotash. Sweet corn is one of the most popular vegetables in the United States, being most popular in the southern and central regions of the country, and can be purchased either fresh, canned, or frozen. Sweet corn ranks among the top ten vegetables in value and per capita consumption.

== Nutrition ==
Cooked yellow sweet corn, unsalted
Nutritional value per 100 g (3.5 oz)
- Energy: 96 kcal (400 kJ)
- Carbohydrates: 21 g
- Sugars sucrose glucose fructose: 4.54 g 2.74 g 0.84 g 0.79 g
- Dietary fiber: 2.4 g
- Fat: 1.5 g
- Protein: 3.4 g
Vitamins and minerals
Vitamins	Quantity %DV^{†}
Vitamin A equiv. beta-Carotene lutein zeaxanthin	1% 13 μg 1% 66 μg 906 μg
Thiamine (B1)	8% 0.093 mg
Riboflavin (B2)	4% 0.057 mg
Niacin (B3)	11% 1.68 mg
Pantothenic acid (B5)	16% 0.792 mg
Vitamin B6	8% 0.139 mg
Folate (B9)	6% 23 μg
Vitamin C	6% 5.5 mg
Vitamin E	0% 0 mg
Vitamin K	0% 0.4 μg
Minerals	Quantity %DV^{†}
Calcium	0% 3 mg
Copper	5% 0.049 mg
Iron	3% 0.45 mg
Magnesium	6% 26 mg
Manganese	7% 0.167 mg
Phosphorus	6% 77 mg
Potassium	9% 270 mg
Selenium	0% 0.2 μg
Sodium	0% 1 mg
Zinc	6% 0.62 mg
- Other constituents: Quantity
- Water: 73.4 g
- Link to USDA entry for FoodData Central
- ^{†}Percentages estimated using US recommendations for adults, except for potassium, which is estimated based on expert recommendation from the National Academies.

Cooked (boiled) yellow sweet corn is 73% water, 21% carbohydrates, 3% protein, and 1% fat (table). In a reference amount of 100 g (3.5 oz), yellow sweet corn supplies 96 calories, 2.4 grams of dietary fiber, and is a moderate source (11–16% of the Daily Value) of the B vitamins, niacin and pantothenic acid, with no other micronutrients in significant content (table).

Sucrose represents 60% of the sugars in cooked yellow sweet corn (table). According to the Ontario government agency, Foodland Ontario, the sugar content of traditional corn is about 9–16%, compared to 14–44% in sweet corn varieties.

== Cultivars ==
Open pollinated (non-hybrid) corn has largely been replaced in the commercial market by sweeter, earlier hybrids, which also have the advantage of maintaining their sweet flavor longer. su cultivars are best when cooked within 30 minutes of harvest. Despite their short storage life, many open-pollinated cultivars such as 'Golden Bantam' remain popular for home gardeners and specialty markets or are marketed as heirloom seeds. Although less sweet, they are often described as more tender and flavorful than hybrids.

=== Genetics ===
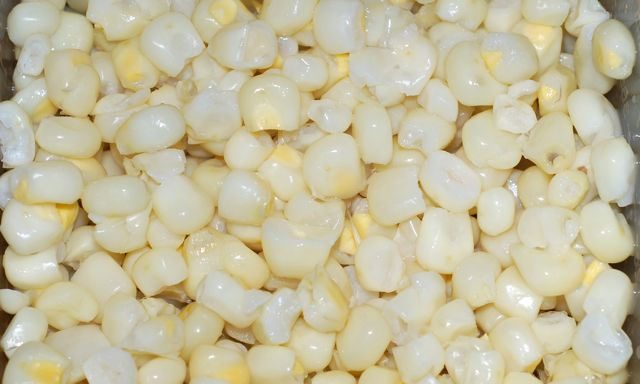
Cut white sweet corn. "Shoepeg" is a popular cultivar from the 1900s.

Early cultivars, including those used by Native Americans, were the result of the mutant su ("sugary") or su1 (O22637) allele of an isoamylase.

Supersweet corn are cultivars of sweet corn which produce higher than normal levels of sugar developed by University of Illinois at Urbana–Champaign professor John Laughnan. He was investigating two specific genes in sweet corn, one of which, the sh2 mutation (P55241, a Glucose-1-phosphate adenylyltransferase), caused the corn to shrivel when dry. After further investigation, Laughnan discovered that the endosperm of sh2 sweet corn kernels store less starch and from 4 to 10 times more sugar than normal su sweet corn.

Illinois Foundation Seeds Inc. was the first seed company to release a supersweet corn named 'Illini Xtra Sweet', but widespread use of supersweet hybrids did not occur until the early 1980s. The common use of supersweet corn rose due to its long shelf life and large sugar content when compared to conventional sweet corn. This has allowed the long-distance shipping of sweet corn and has enabled manufacturers to can sweet corn without adding extra sugar or salt. Breeding has resolved the germination rate issue, but it is still generally true that sh2 corn is less juicy than their su counterparts. sh2-i ("shrunken2-intermediate") cultivars under development exploits a different mutation on the same gene to create varieties that are both juicy and sweet.

The third gene mutation to be discovered is the se (or se1) for "sugary enhanced" allele, responsible for so-called "Everlasting Heritage" cultivars, such as 'Kandy Korn'. Cultivars with the se alleles have a longer storage life and contain 12–20% sugar. The gene for Se1 has been located.

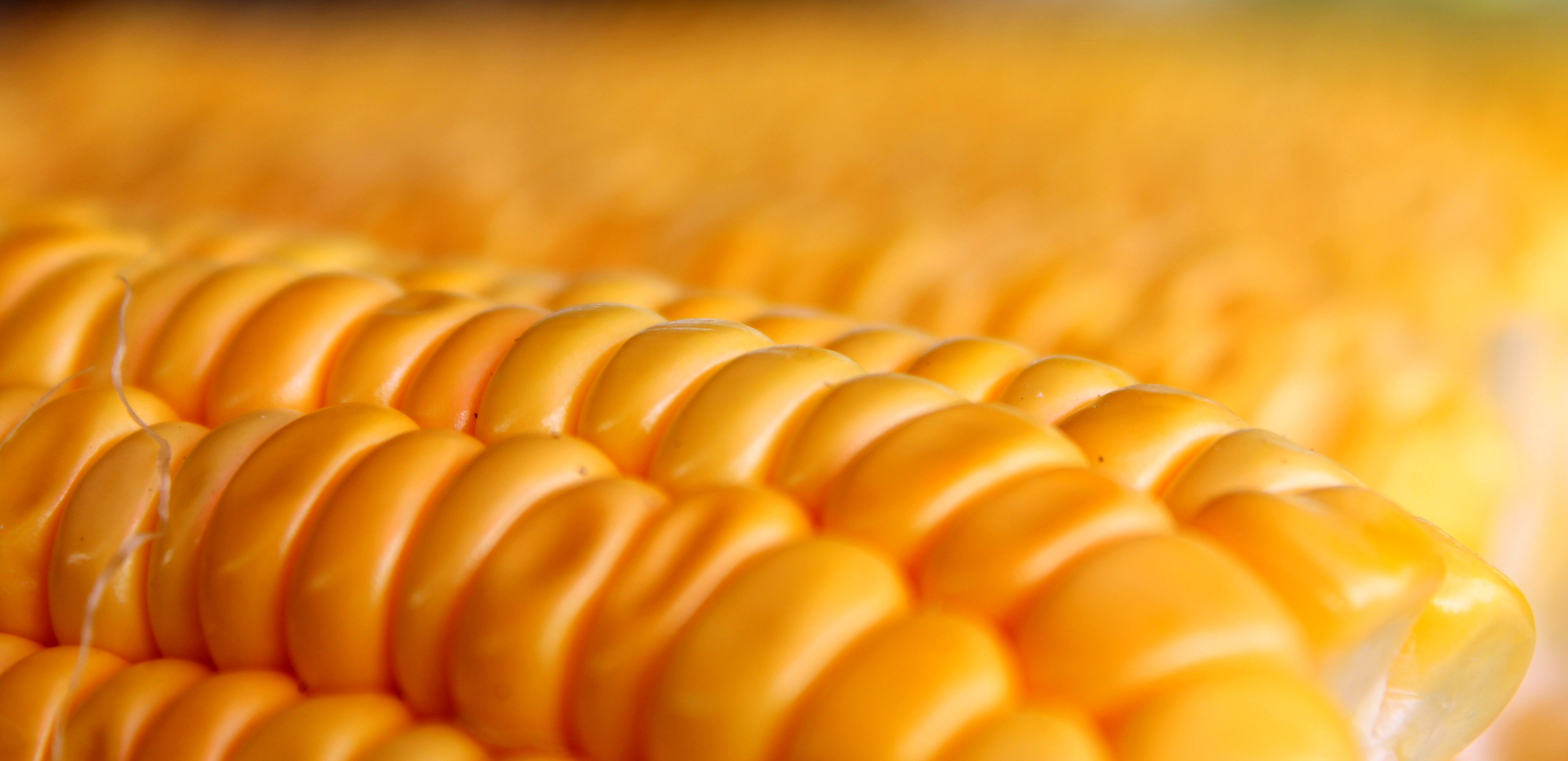
Cooking turns yellow sweet corn golden

All of the alleles responsible for sweet corn are recessive, so it must be isolated from other corn, such as field corn and popcorn, that release pollen at the same time; the endosperm develops from genes from both parents, and heterozygous kernels will be tough and starchy. The se and su alleles do not need to be isolated from each other. However supersweet cultivars containing the sh2 allele must be grown in isolation from other cultivars to avoid cross-pollination and resulting starchiness, either in space (various sources quote minimum quarantine distances from 100 to 400 feet or 30 to 120 m) or in time (i.e., the supersweet corn does not pollinate at the same time as other corn in nearby fields).

Modern breeding methods have also introduced cultivars incorporating multiple gene types:

- sy (for synergistic) adds the sh2 gene to some kernels (usually 25%) on the same cob as a se base (either homozygous or heterozygous)
- augmented sh2 adds the se and su gene to a sh2 parent

Often seed producers of the sy and augmented sh2 types will use brand names or trademarks to distinguish these cultivars instead of mentioning the genetics behind them. Generally these brands or trademarks will offer a choice of white, bi-color and yellow cultivars which otherwise have very similar characteristics.

=== Genetically modified corn ===
Genetically modified sweet corn is available to commercial growers to resist certain insects or herbicides, or both. Such transgenic varieties are not available to home or small acreage growers due to protocols that must be followed in their production.
