= A la chorrillana (Peruvian cuisine) =

Peruvian sauce and cooking style

- Type: Sauce and cooking style
- Place of origin: Peru
- Main ingredients: Onions, tomatoes, garlic, peas, ají amarillo

A la chorrillana refers to a cooking style from Peruvian cuisine which usually consists of stewing or stir-frying a dish with a sauce primarily made from onions, tomatoes, garlic, peas, and ají amarillo (yellow chili pepper).

== History ==
The origin of this culinary style dates back to the 19th century in the popular picanterías of the Chorrillos District near Lima, during the period of Chinese immigration to Peru, when Asian cooks introduced the stir frying technique.

Historical records show the early internationalization of this technique. For instance, the 1912 Chilean cookbook La Cocina Moderna y Práctica by Lucía Vergara de Smith documented several Peruvian preparations, including a recipe for "fish a la chorrillana" (pescado a la chorrillana), specifically noting that the chili pepper used "must be Peruvian".

== Usage ==
The beef version, bistec a la chorrillana, is considered a predecessor to the famous Peruvian dish lomo saltado. Today, fish (pescado a la chorrillana) and steak are the main dishes prepared using this technique.

== See also ==
- Lomo saltado
- List of sauces
- Peruvian cuisine
