= Tacu-tacu =

Peruvian rice and bean dish

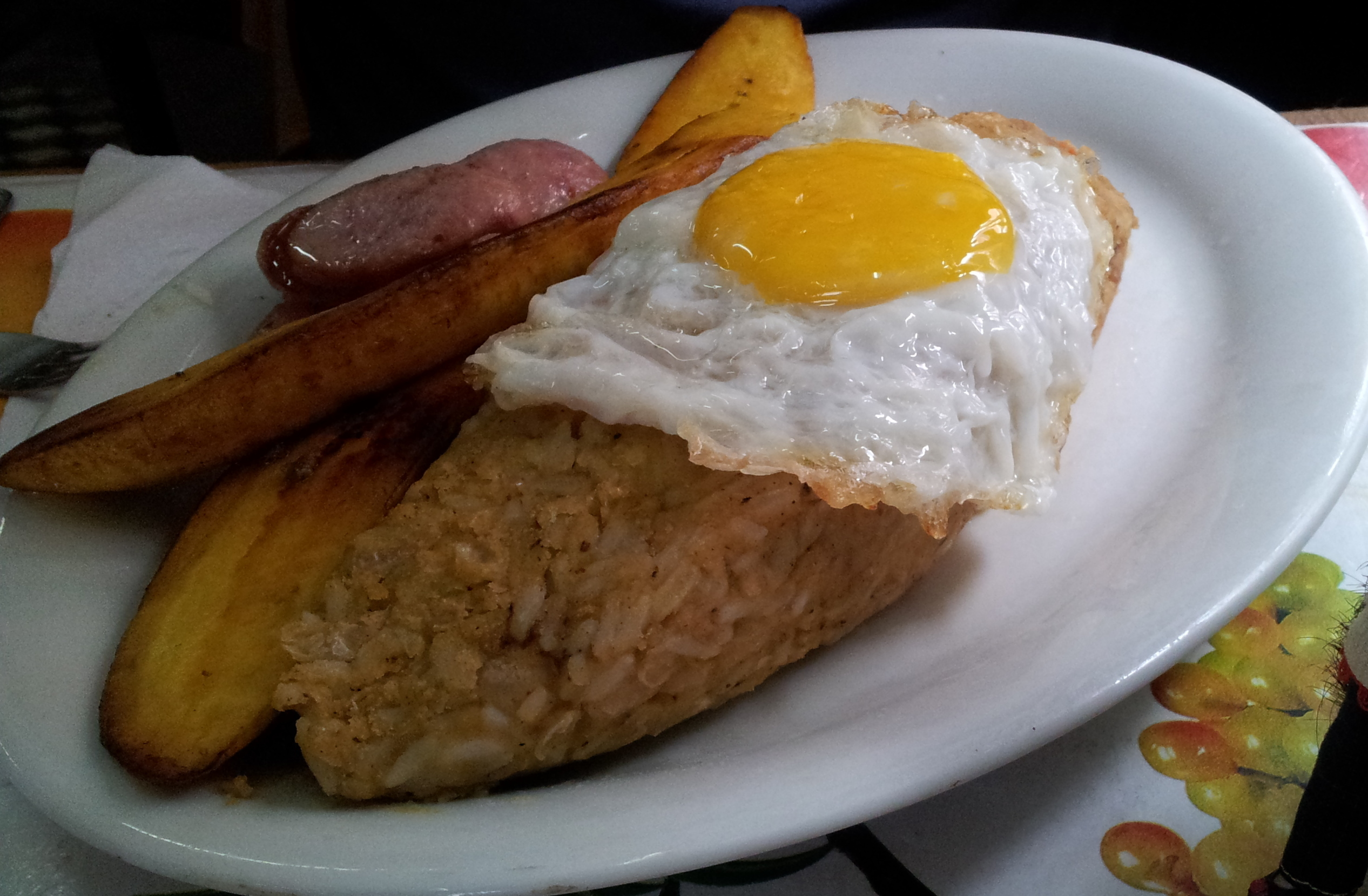
- Type: Rice and beans
- Place of origin: Peru
- Region or state: Northeast
- Associated cuisine: Peruvian cuisine

Tacu-tacu is a Peruvian dish of rice and beans that is fried, formed into a flat oval shape and set under toppings such as steak or fried eggs. It is often eaten as a breakfast or as second course.

== History ==
According to culinary historian Maricel Presilla, food historians generally credit the dish's origins to enslaved Afro-Peruvians on Peru's northern coast during the colonial period. Food historian Andrew Dalby places tacu-tacu in a class of rice and bean meals that emerged from rice and bean dishes brought over from Africa during the transatlantic slave trade, including gallo pinto in Nicaragua and Costa Rica, Moros y Cristianos in Cuba, and Arroz con gandules in Puerto Rico.

The notion that the dish was created as a way to use up the odd remaining ingredients is expressed in the word's etymology, being derived from "takuy", meaning "mix different things together."

== Description ==
Tacu-tacu is made by pan-frying rice and beans and shaping them into a flat oval, often with a wooden spoon. Over the top, toppings such as meat or eggs are added. Making tacu-tacu is often seen as a way to use leftover rice and beans, giving it a reputation as an unpretentious dish.

The north is understood to specialize in the dish, though every region has its own version of tacu-tacu, often distinguished by the type of bean. An example is Piura, a city in northwestern Peru, where Canary beans are used. Meats topping different variations may include steaks, flattened out into a thin sheet that covers much of the dish, slices of beef tenderloin simmered in onions and tomato, or ripe plantains. Seafood versions (known tacu-tacu de mariscos) are made by boiling beans, rice and seafood such as cuttlefish, octopus and prawns. After being flattened, steaks are sometimes breaded, in a version known as sábana con tacu tacu.

The way beans are used in tacu-tacu is unusual in Peruvian cooking, with them more typically cooked in thick soups, served over rice. A similar dish called porotada is eaten in Lambayeque, a region in the country's north.

== Restaurants ==
Tacu-tacu is served in restaurants across Peru, both casual and upmarket. Haute cuisine versions of tacu-tacu are smaller than those in restaurants catering to a more general audience, and often have large amounts of seafood. Some examples of tacu-tacu served as haute cuisine include a serving with salsa criolla and seared yellowfin tuna, or that of chef Pedro Miguel Schiaffino, who has at times served a lima bean tacu-tacu with kid goat in the corn beer chicha de jora.

== Gallery ==
Variations

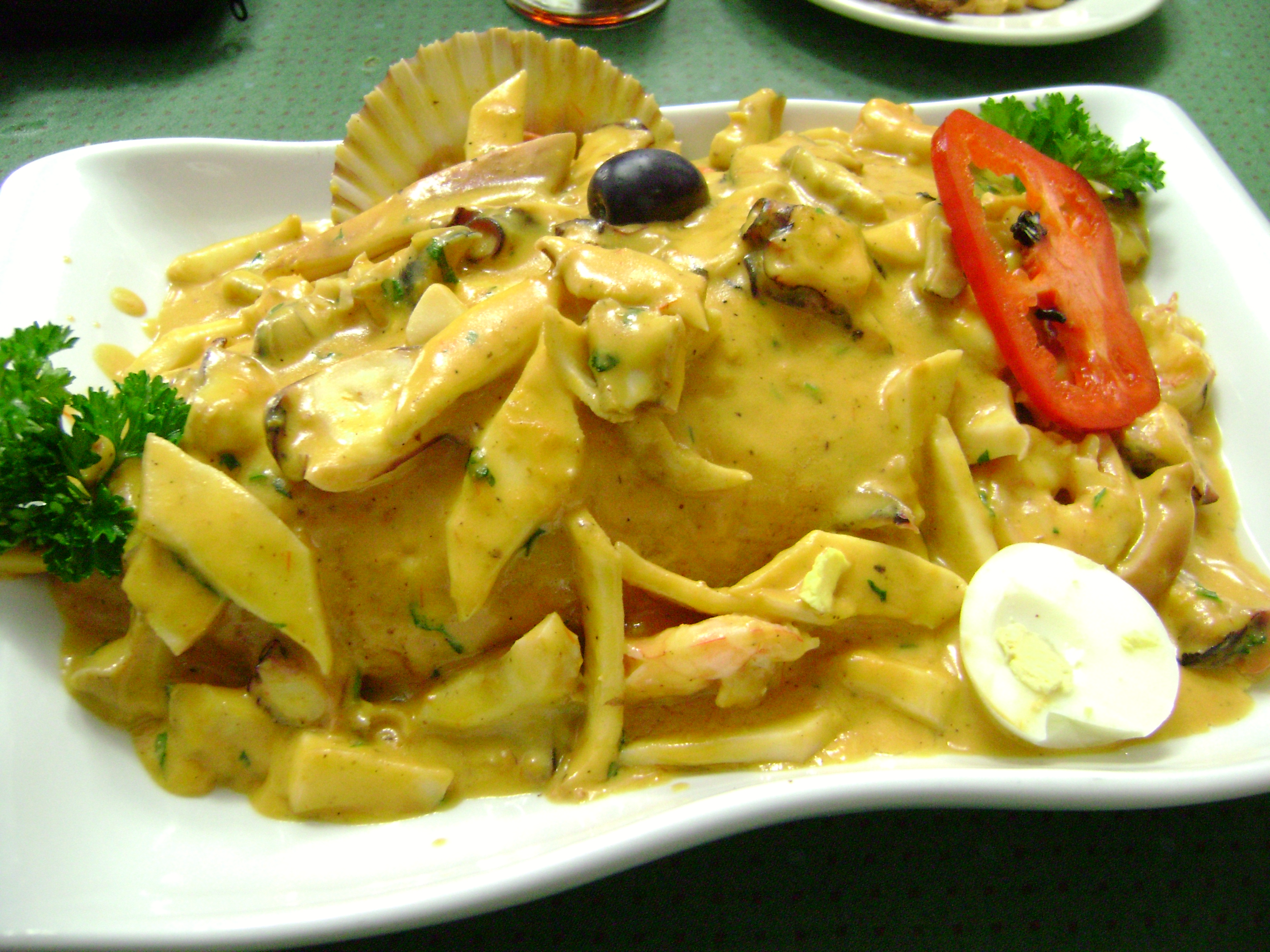
Seafood sauce in Lima

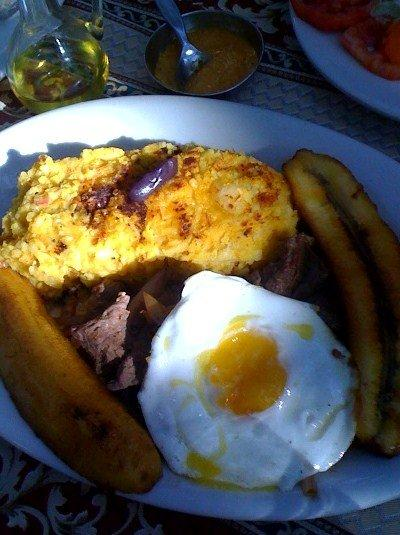
Beef loin, plantain, and eggs in Ica

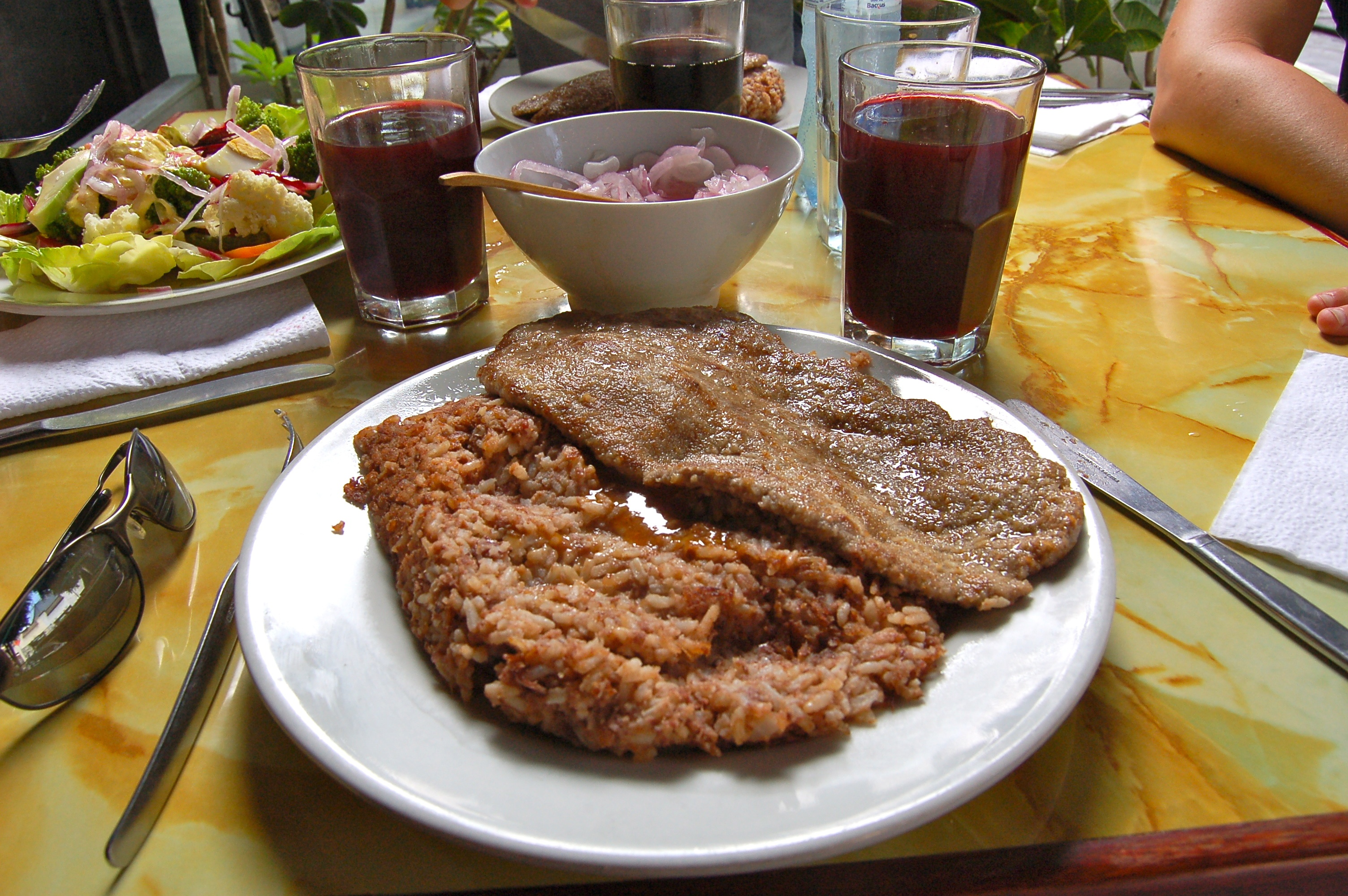
Breaded beef loin and salsa criolla with the purple corn drink chicha morada in Lima

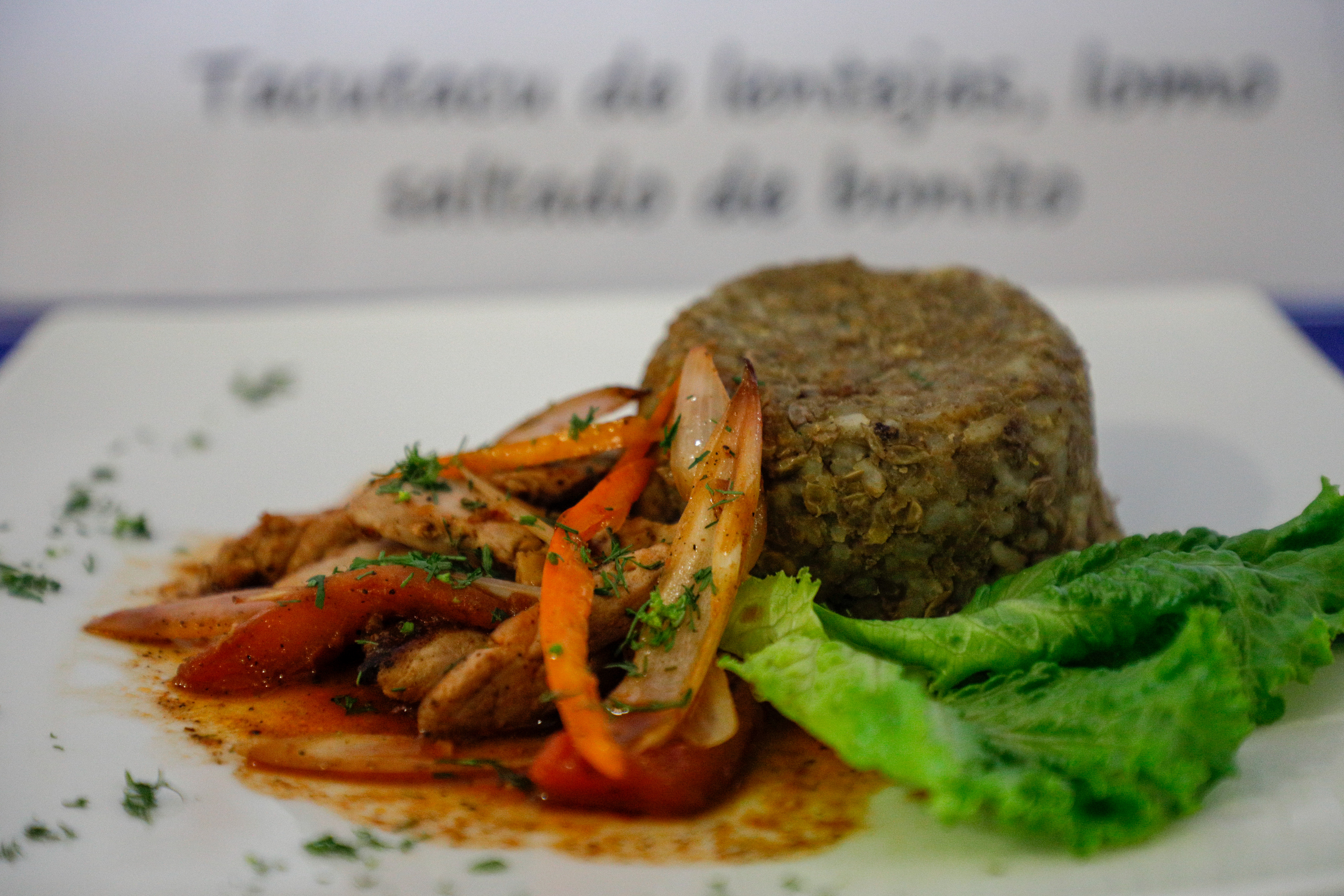
Bonito, Peruvian anchoveta, and mackerel in Lima

== Sources ==
- Dalby, Andrew (2013). The Breakfast Book. London: Reaktion Books. ISBN 978-1-78023-086-3.
- Janer, Zilkia (2008). Latino Food Culture. Food Cultures in America. Westport, Connecticut and London: Greenwood Press. ISBN 978-0-313-34027-7.
- Matta, Raúl (2014). "República gastronómica y país de cocineros: comida, política, medios y una nueva idea de nación para el Perú" [Gastronomic Republic and Country of Cooks: Food, Politics, Mass Media, and a New Idea of Nation for Peru]. Revista Colombiana de Antropología (in Spanish). 50 (2). doi:10.22380/2539472X45.
- O'Leary, Kelly (2011). "Peru". In Albala, Ken (ed.). Food Cultures of the World Encyclopedia: The Americas. Santa Barbara, California: Greenwood. ISBN 978-0-313-37626-9.
- Presilla, Maricel E. (2012). Gran Cocina Latina: The Food of Latin America. New York & London: W. W. Norton & Company. ISBN 978-0-393-05069-1.
- Pérez Gálvez, Jesús Claudio; López-Guzmán, Tomás; Buiza, Franklin Cordova; Medina-Viruel, Miguel Jesús (December 2017). "Gastronomy as an element of attraction in a tourist destination: the case of Lima, Peru". Journal of Ethnic Foods. 4 (4): 254–261. doi:10.1016/j.jef.2017.11.002.
- Stanbury Aguirre, Jorge (1995). La gran cocina peruana: La cocina auroral, moderna y contemporánea del Perú [The Great Peruvian Cuisine: The Early, Modern, and Contemporary Cuisine of Peru] (in Spanish). Lima, Peru: Peru Reporting E.I.R.L. ISBN 1-886617007.
