= Suspiro de limeña =

Peruvian dessert

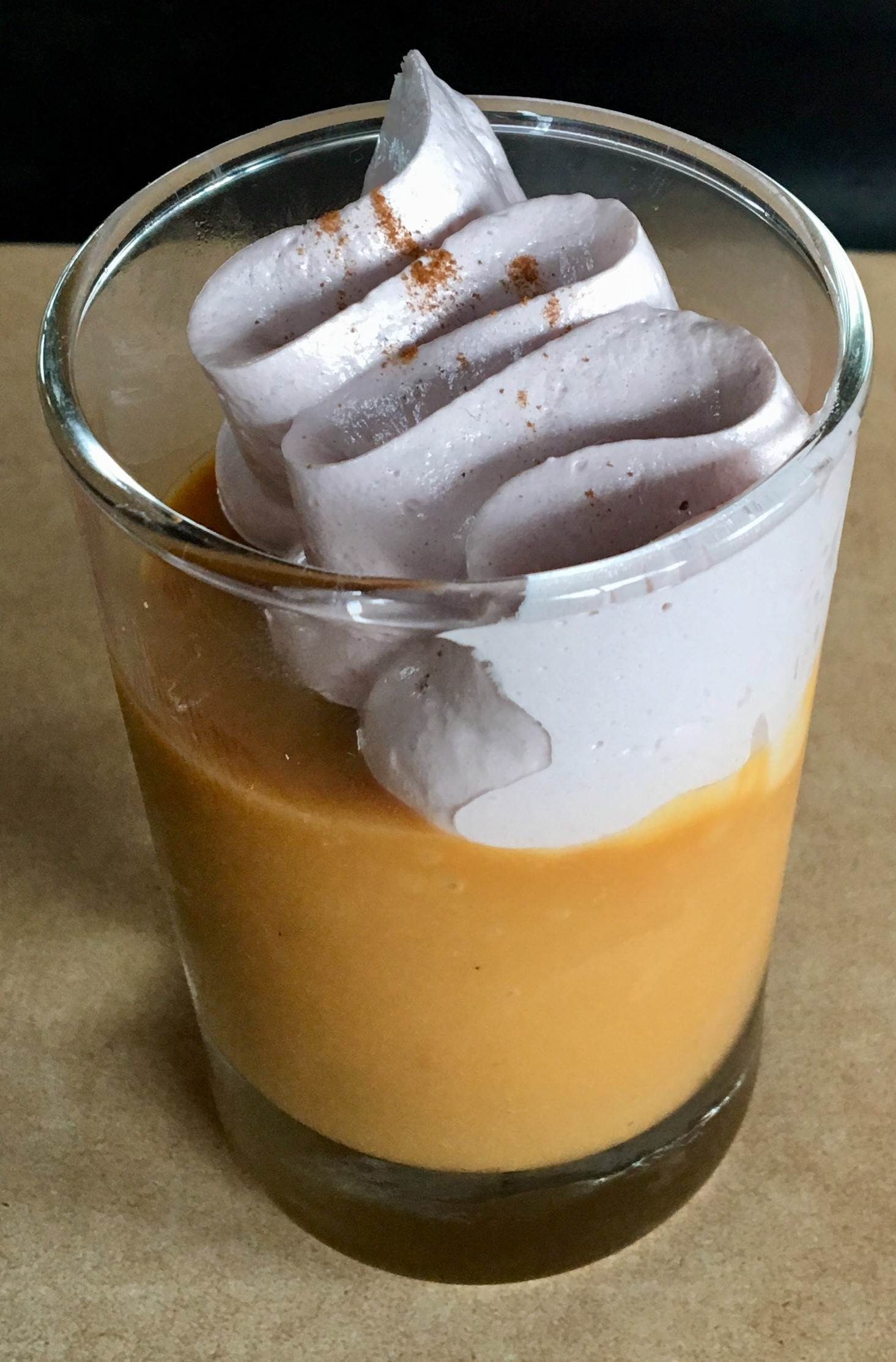
- Alternative names: Suspiro a la limeña
- Type: Dessert
- Place of origin: Peru
- Region or state: Lima
- Main ingredients: manjar blanco (milk, sugar, egg yolks, vanilla), meringue (egg whites, Oporto, cinnamon)

Suspiro de limeña or suspiro a la limeña (lit. 'sigh of the lady from Lima') is a dessert of Peruvian gastronomy.

== Origin ==
The origins of the dessert are in the middle of the nineteenth century in Lima, Peru. The dessert is based around manjar blanco, a similar confection to dulce de leche, itself coming from blancmange, a dish from the Middle Ages. Blancmange came to Peru from Spain. It consisted of a thick cream made of milk, sugar, almond flour and some Iberian ingredients. An even older recipe had it made of chicken breast boiled in milk, almonds and thickened with flour and was meant as a bland food for the sick and weak. The other element of the suspiro de Limeña is meringue, also brought to Peru by the Spaniards.

The dessert is consumed mainly in Lima and in other coastal Peruvian cities. It is a staple of Peruvian restaurants abroad.

== Preparation ==
The manjar blanco layer of the dessert is made with whole milk and sugar boiled until thick and caramel colored to which are added egg yolk and sometimes, but not necessarily vanilla essence.

The merengue top layer is made from egg whites and port wine syrup (made from port wine and sugar boiled together until thickened) and is sprinkled with cinnamon.

== See also ==
- List of desserts
