= Novoandina =

Modern style of cuisine from Peru and Andean countries

Novoandina is a modern style of cuisine from Peru and Andean countries, which combines modern techniques with traditional ingredients of Andean and Peruvian cuisine.

== History ==
La gran olla Huacachina is the founding dish of the novoandina cuisine, created by Bernardo Roca Rey in 1986 as an answer to the challenge expounded in the Huacachina lake by a foreign group of chefs whose dishes had been judged by Roca Rey in the festival organized by the Gastronomical Association of Peru (AGAPE). The pioneer of the novoandina cuisine went to the market of the near city of Ica, and he invented this meal with the ingredients that he could find.

== Ingredients and recipes ==
Ingredients in the novoandina cuisine include achira, arracacha, quinoa, coca leaves, mashua, maca, yacon, Andean potatoes, uchu, ulluku, oca, llama meat and Andean peppers (rocoto and ajies).

=== Quinotto ===
Quinotto is the national version of the typical Italian Risotto, eaten with chicken, prawn or shellfish.

Gastón Acurio has proposed plates like trucha marinada con blinis de achira, lomo de atún con crema de arracacha and quinua rosada. Achira is a tubercle that comes from the Amazonian forest. It was cultivated and used by pre-Inca cultures like the Chavín, Nasca and Paracas cultures.

=== Maca ===
Gastronomical journalist Hirka Roca Rey, in her restaurant called Pantagruel, initiated the internationalization of this cuisine. She created plates like chicharrones en salsa de maca.

=== Yacón, red pepper ===
Rafael Piqueras presents the pulpo a la parrilla con vinagreta de yacón and ceviche con espuma de ají amarillo, plates that he presented in Spain, in the gastronomical fair of Madrid.

=== Coca, Mashua ===
Cucho La Rosa is the intellectual author of the coca sour and the bread of coca and mashua, Coca is the most controversial product inside the Novoandina cuisine.
