= Ají de gallina =

Peruvian chicken stew

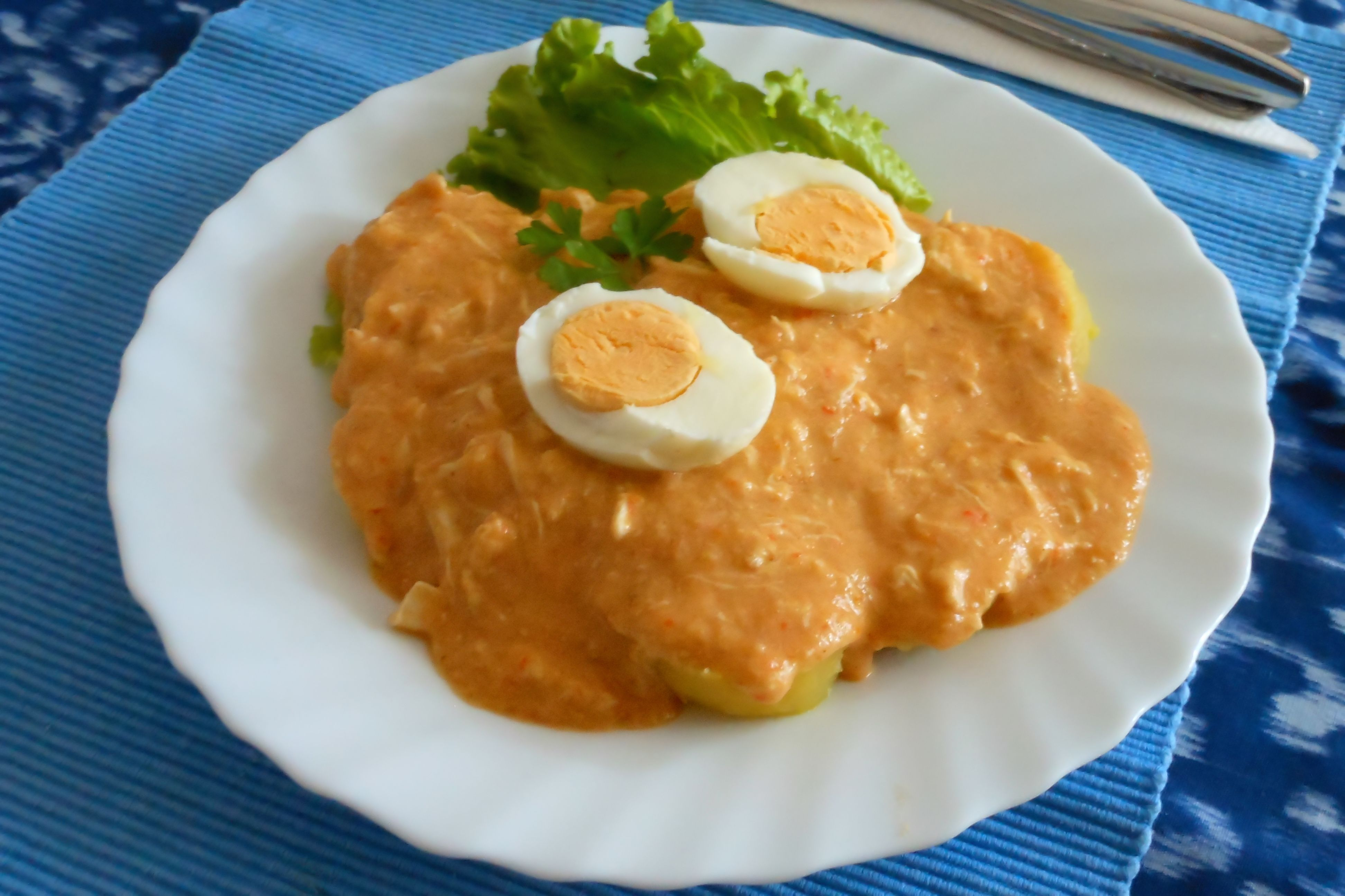
- Alternative names: Ají de pollo
- Type: Stew
- Course: Main course
- Place of origin: Peru
- Associated cuisine: Peruvian
- Invented: 16th century
- Main ingredients: Ají amarillo, sofrito
- Ingredients generally used: bread, milk, cheese, nuts
- Variations: Turkey; Canned tuna

Ají de gallina is a Peruvian chicken stew. The dish is considered a popular Peruvian comfort food, and the name translates to "chicken chili" or "hen's chili" in English. Ají de gallina is composed of a sofrito base made by sautéing red onion, garlic, and ají amarillo together, and adding shredded poached poultry and stock. The stew is then thickened with bread soaked in milk or evaporated milk, cheese such as parmesan, and ground nuts such as pecans or walnuts. Ají amarillo ("yellow chili") is a mildly spicy pepper native to South America, common in many Peruvian cuisine dishes. Ají de gallina is typically served with boiled potatoes and white rice, and garnished with black olives and hard-boiled egg.

== History ==
Aji de gallina is believed to have evolved from manjar blanco or white dish, a combination of ground almonds, milk, sugar, and chicken or fish, first introduced to Spain by the Moors prior to the Reconquista. While in Europe white dish became a dessert after the Middle Ages (see blancmange), in colonial Peru the stew was combined with indigenous chili peppers to form a savory main dish. Oral histories say it was created by former chefs to the French aristocracy fleeing the French Revolution and finding new employment in the Viceroyalty of Peru. It was created using leftover chicken and potatoes, and other variants include using turkey or canned tuna.

== See also ==
- List of chicken dishes
- List of stews
- Opor – Indonesian coconut milk dish
