= Causa limeña =

Appetizer in Peruvian cuisine

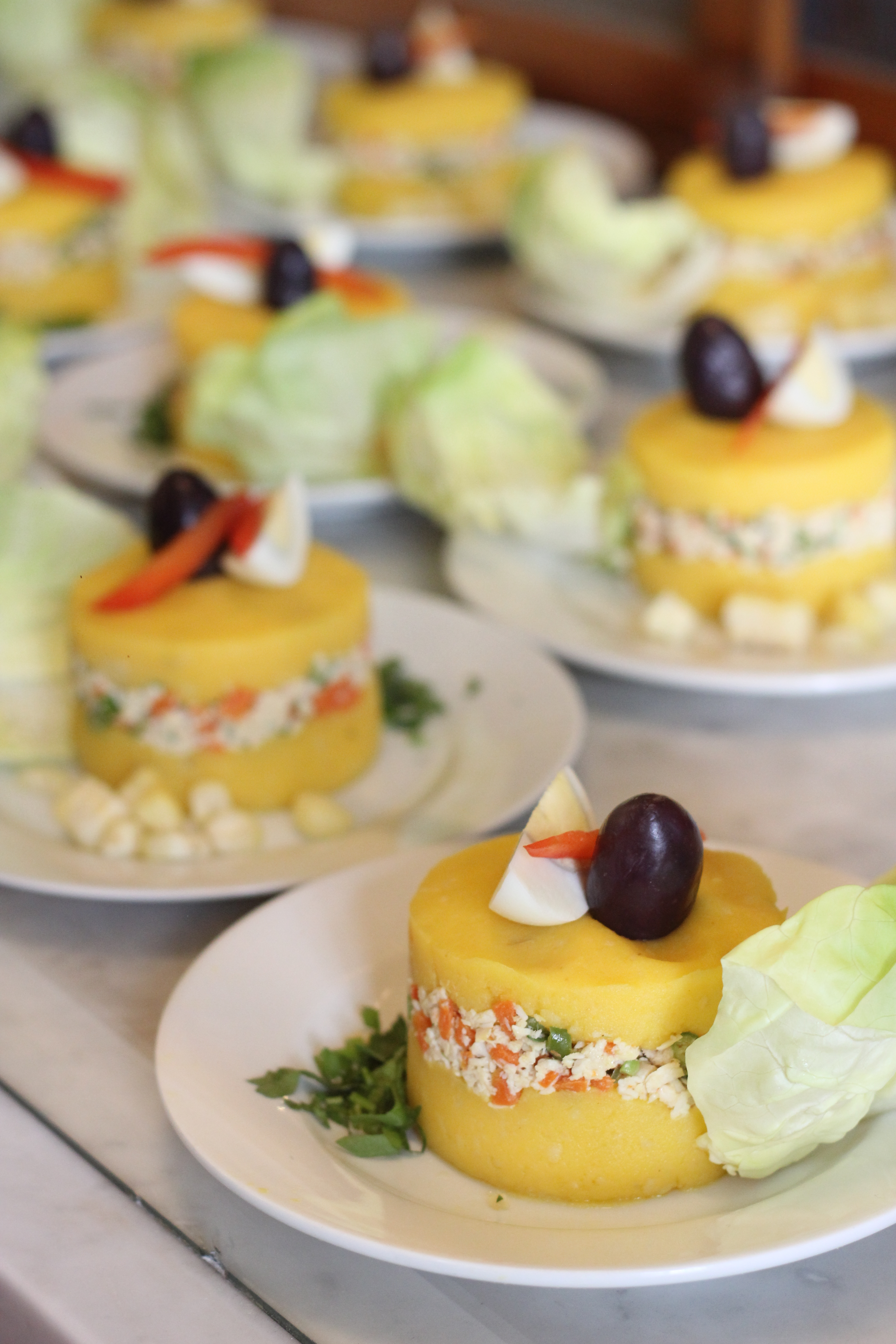
- Course: Entrée
- Place of origin: Peru
- Region or state: Coast
- Serving temperature: Cold
- Main ingredients: Potato, chilli pepper, lemon, mayonnaise, avocado, chicken or tuna, varied vegetables

Causa limeña, also called causa a la limeña or simply causa, is a typical and widespread entrée of the Peruvian gastronomy which has a pre-Columbian origin.

== History ==
Causa is best described as a sort of mini-casserole, with the top and bottom consisting of yellow potato and the filling typically of any white meat. In ancient Peru, it was prepared with yellow potatoes, which have a soft texture, and kneaded with crushed chilli peppers, although it can also be made with any other variety of potato. It can also be known as 'causa rellena', where 'causa' refers to the yellow potato and 'rellena' to the stuffing. During the Viceroyalty era, between the 16th and 19th centuries, lemon (originally from Asia) was added, reaching the modern form, in both the ingredients and the presentation. As Peruvian executive chef Nilo Do Carmo said, "Created with ingredients from the coast and the mountains, the causa limeña is a valuable appetizer and essential on the menu, representing pure Peruvian patriotism even to this day."

=== Etymology ===
There are many hypotheses about the name of the dish. First it was suggested that it comes from the Quechua kawsay, which means "necessary sustenance" and "food", or "what feeds", a name also given to the potato.

There are other hypotheses about the name of the dish that link it to war episodes of the contemporary history of the Andean country. In some versions of the story, it is said that causa was first prepared during the colonial period, with the Spanish knowing it as "kausay". According to Peruvian historian Rodolfo Tafur, the word "kausay" originates from the Quechuan dialect, meaning "life" or "giver of life."

Even though this clearly Limean dish exists since the Viceroyalty, it did not have a specific name; it was with the arrival of the libertador José de San Martín that, in order to solve the expenses of the military campaign, this dish was sold in the corners of the Limean streets, as a way to contribute to the cause (por la causa in Spanish, "for the cause"). On the other side, it may also be possible that causa limeña was a patriotic dish during the Peruvian-Chilean Pacific war. At the time, women would help the soldiers by offering them this cold dish.

While this dish is called causa in Lima, in the northern city of Trujillo the name is used to designate any spicy dish.

== Description ==
This dish is traditionally made with yellow potato, lemon, boiled egg, yellow chilli pepper and black olives. It also may have avocado for the stuffing and lettuce for decoration purposes. The preparation admits many variants, like the causa filled with tuna, trout, chicken, shellfish or other white meat. In some cases, it can even be made with spider crab or octopus. It is served with a light coating of mayonnaise.

Apart from yellow potatoes, the dough can also be made with lima beans or yellow yuca.

== See also ==
- Ocopa
- Papa rellena
- Patatas bravas
