= Ají amarillo =

Peruvian variety of chili pepper

- Species: Capsicum baccatum
- Cultivar: 'Ají amarillo'
- Origin: Peru

Ají amarillo (Spanish for "yellow chili"), also called ají escabeche, is a variety of chili pepper of the species Capsicum baccatum grown in Peru and Bolivia. Despite the name, the fruit ripens to a deep golden-orange. It is one of the most important ingredients in Peruvian cuisine, and in its dried form it is known as ají mirasol.

== Description ==
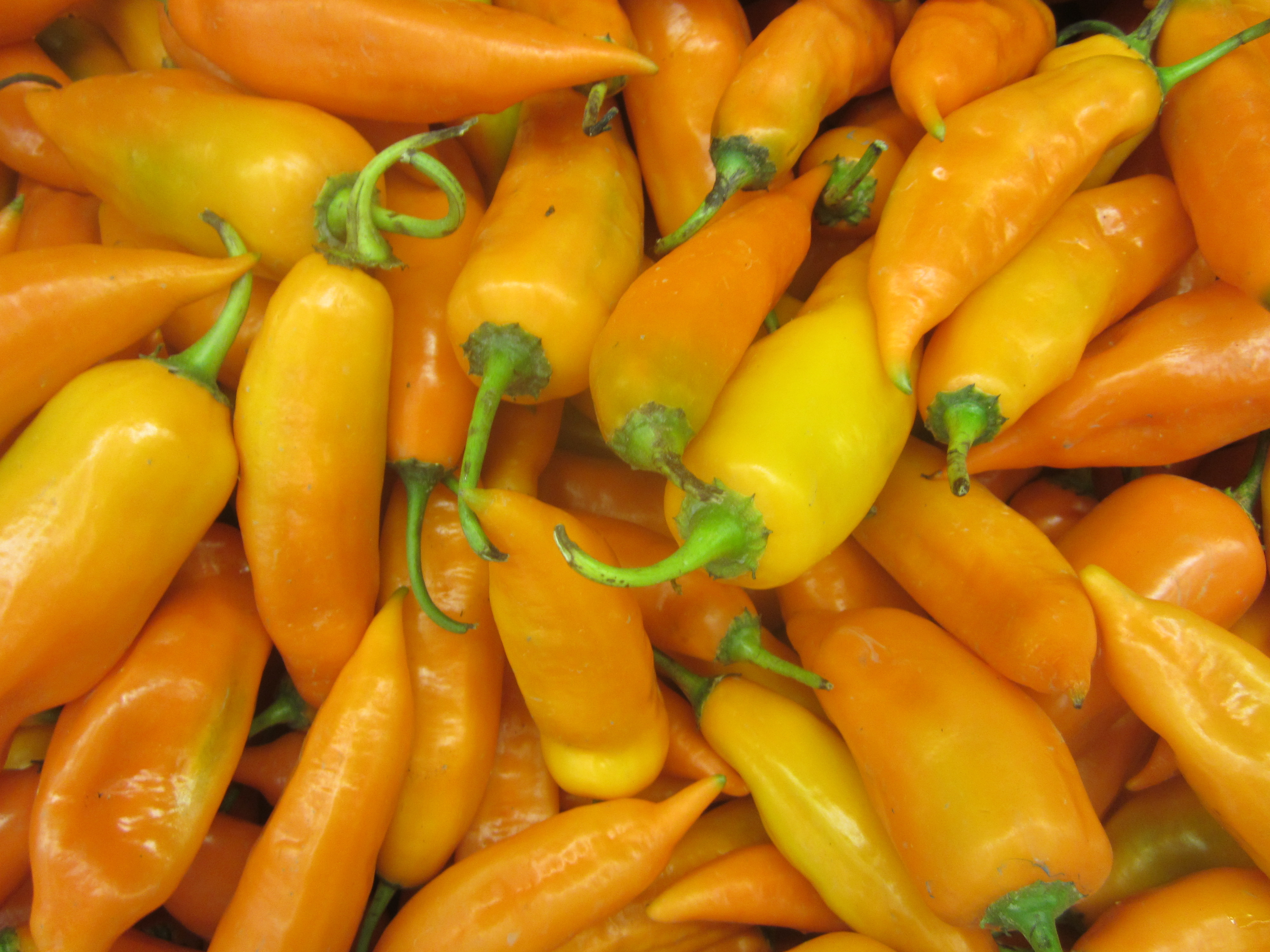

The pods are elongated and tapering, ripening from green to a bright golden-orange. Ají amarillo has a fruity flavour that is often compared to passion fruit and mango, with a moderate heat of roughly 30,000 to 50,000 Scoville heat units, comparable to a serrano pepper. When the fresh pods are dried, usually in the sun, they are called ají mirasol, which has a more concentrated, raisin-like sweetness used in slow-cooked dishes.

== Culinary use ==
Ají amarillo is regarded as one of the most important ingredients in Peruvian cooking; together with garlic and red onion it is sometimes described as part of a "holy trinity" of Peruvian flavour. It gives many national dishes their characteristic colour and taste, among them ají de gallina, papa a la Huancaína and lomo saltado.

== Recognition ==
In January 2025 the spice company McCormick named ají amarillo its "Flavor of the Year", citing growing interest in Peruvian flavours beyond their traditional cuisine.
