= Chicha morada =

Prehispanic corn beverage from Peru

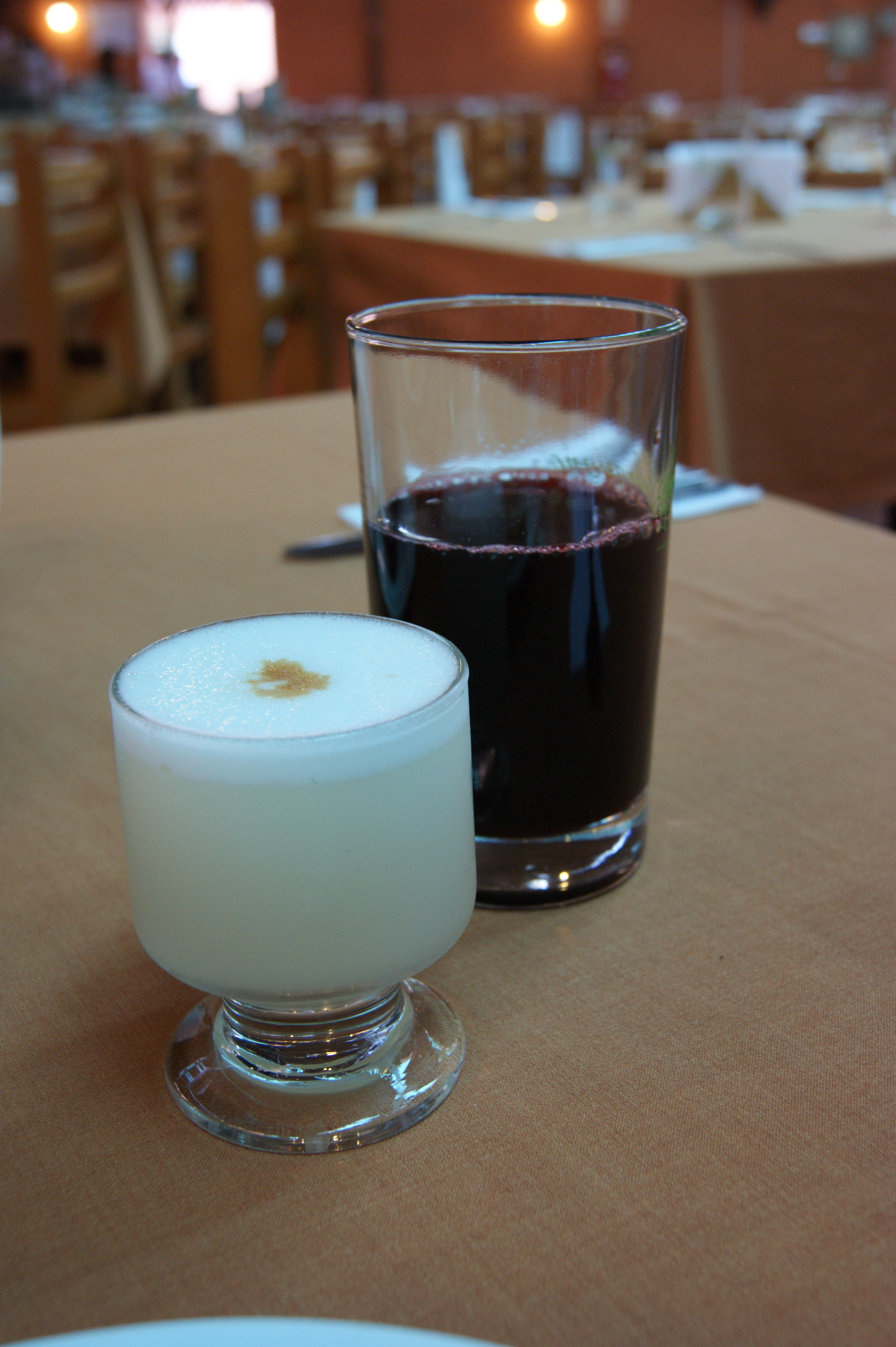
- Two traditional Peruvian drinks paired together, chicha morada (right) and pisco sour (left)
- Type: Beverage
- Origin: Peru
- Color: Purple
- Style: Glass
- Ingredients: Purple corn, pineapple, cinnamon, cloves

Chicha morada (literally, Purple Chicha) is a beverage from the Andean regions of Perú that is currently consumed at an international level.

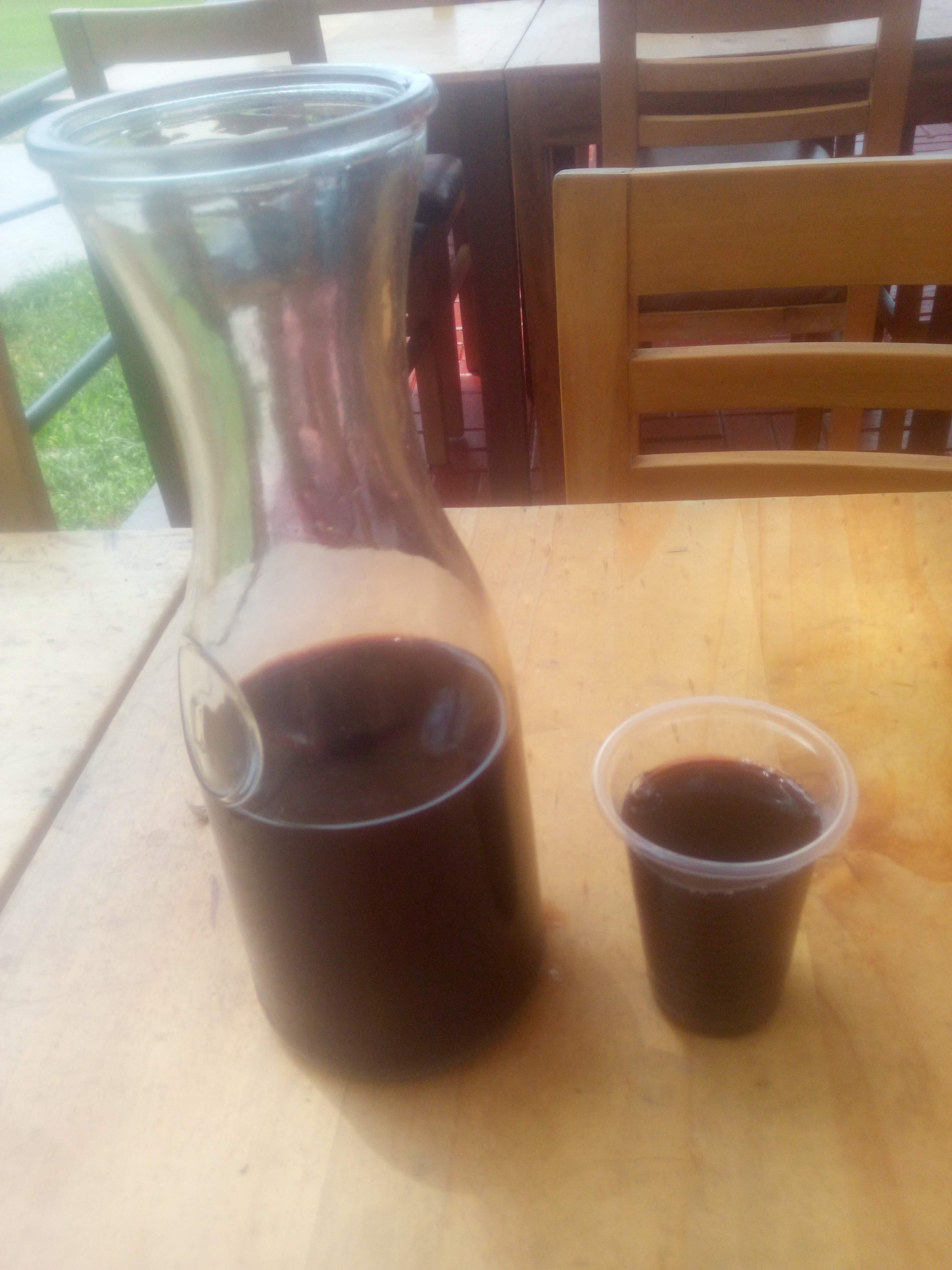
Chicha morada served in restaurant in Lima

The base ingredient of the drink is corn culli or ckolli, which is a Peruvian variety of corn known commonly as purple corn which is abundantly grown and harvested along the Andes Mountains.

Its history and consumption was already widespread in pre-Columbian times, prior to the establishment of the Inca Empire. The current preparation can be traced through different works of the nineteenth century as those of Juan de Arona, and Carlos Prince. The oldest references to its preparation as we know it today come from the writings produced in the mid-1870s by the French Camille Pradier-Fodéré.

== Preparation ==
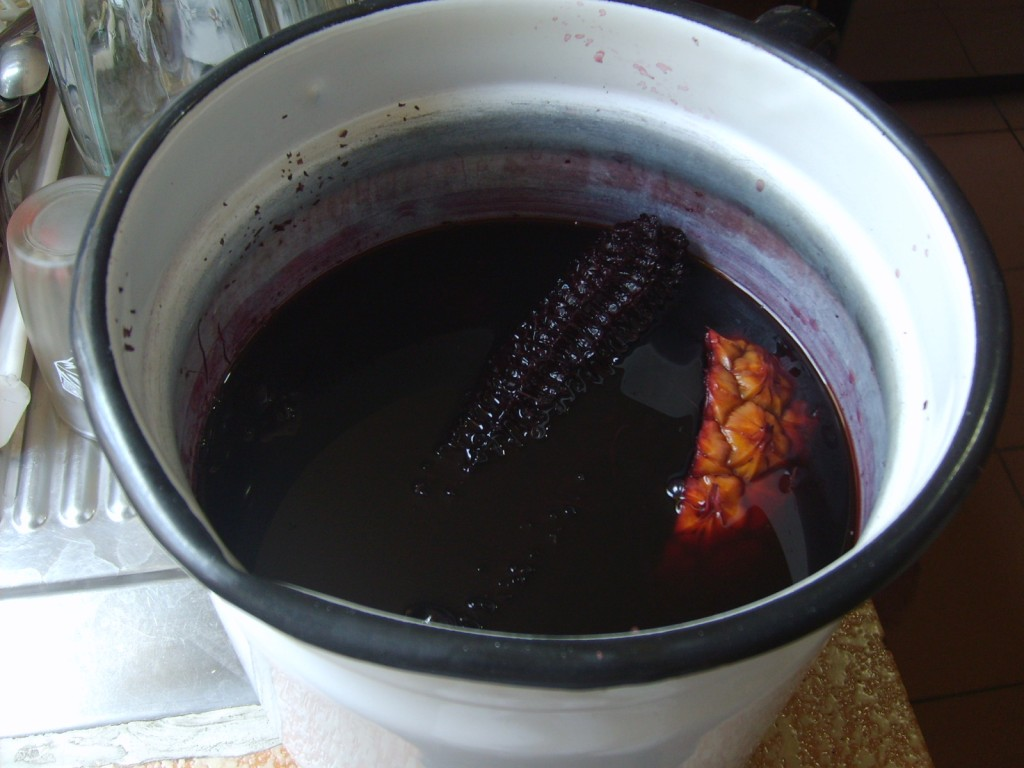
Purple corn being boiled with a small portion of pineapple to prepare chicha morada

Nowadays, chicha morada is consumed in three ways: A traditional homemade preparation, a pre-manufactured product or a manufactured product.

- Traditional preparation consists of boiling the purple corn in water along with pineapple peels and pieces of quince, adding a pinch of cinnamon and a few cloves. The boiled mixture is strained and allowed to cool, after which sugar or chancaca is added, as well as chopped fruit and lemon if desired.
- The pre-manufactured product is sold in two ways:
  - As packets of dry powder manufactured with a basis of sugar, acidifiers and artificial flavors to which the preparer should only add water. Although consumption is massive because of the advantages of low cost and sweet taste, such products do not achieve the characteristic flavor of a chicha prepared in a traditional way, nor do they contain the antioxidants derived from purple corn.
  - As bags of purple chicha concentrate (syrup) intended for large-scale distribution. This version contains all the extract of the fruits, retaining flavor and aroma. The preparer should only add water and lemon juice.
- The manufactured product consists of chicha morada produced in a large-scale industrialized form that is sold in small cans or bottles of personal or family size, in the style of soft drinks.

A notable Peruvian delicacy can be derived from chicha morada by adding a binder such as chuño or corn starch to the traditional preparation. This porridge-like substance is what Peruvians call "mazamorra morada", to which is added dried or fresh fruits such as prunes and raisins. Its consumption is very widespread in Peru in celebrations together with chicha morada, but it increases during October.

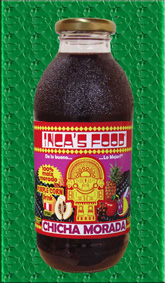
Large-scale manufactured chicha morada

== Cultural impact ==
- Consumption figures for chicha morada in Peru have even reached that of Coca-Cola. Its sale is prevalent in restaurants, supermarkets and others.
- Import and Export Doña Isabel leads the export market of chicha morada bottled to North America, Central America, Europe, Australia and Japan with 23% of total sales.
- In 2007, the company Alicorp, with its Negrita brand, unsuccessfully launched bottled chicha morada, ready for consumption.
- The export of purple corn during the year 2008 reached its zenith, in countries with an influx of Peruvian immigrants.
- Chicha morada is the representative drink of Peruvian cuisine, because it is refreshing and versatile for pairing. It combines in any occasion of consumption, either individually or as a group and is consumed by young people and adults. In October, the Peruvian 'purple month' (known as the month in which the procession of the Lord of Miracles takes place in Lima and the parishioners wear purple habits), chicha morada combines a lot with the famous anticuchos, picarones, turrón de Doña Pepa, mazamorra morada, among other dishes representative of Peruvian cuisine.

== See also ==
- Chicha
- Chicha de jora
- Colada morada
