= Chicha de jora =

Prehispanic corn beer from Peru

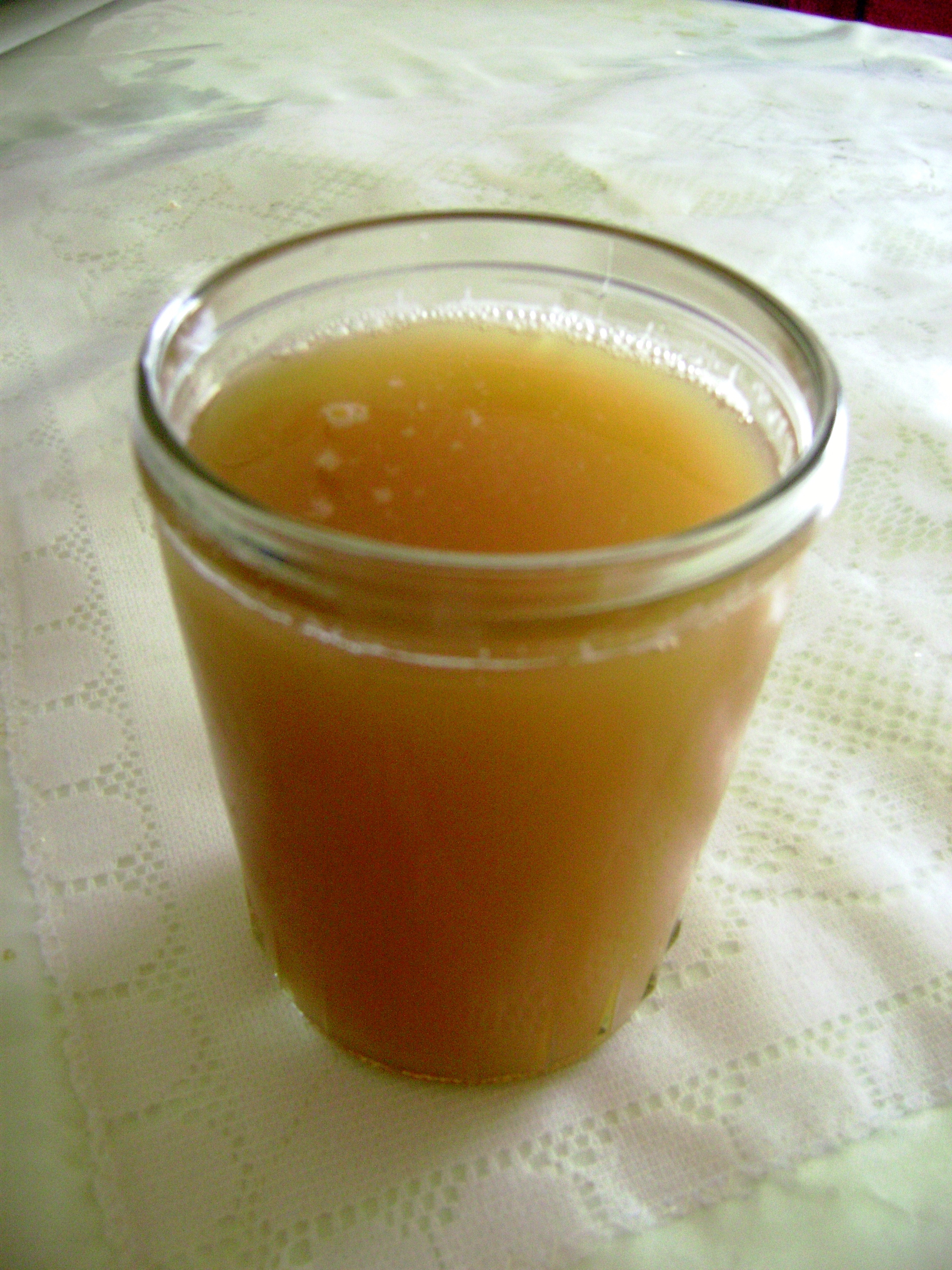
Chicha de jora, a type of corn beer

Chicha de jora is a corn beer or chicha prepared by germinating maize, extracting the malt sugars, boiling the wort, and fermenting it in large vessels (traditionally huge earthenware vats) for several days. The process is essentially similar to the process for the production of European-style beer. Some add quinoa or other adjuncts to give it consistency before it is boiled down. Chancaca, a hard raw form of cane sugar (not refined), helps with the fermentation process.

It is traditionally prepared from a specific kind of yellow maize (jora) and is usually referred to as chicha de jora. It has a pale straw color, a slightly milky appearance, and a slightly sour aftertaste, reminiscent of hard apple cider. It is drunk either young and sweet or mature and strong. It contains a relatively small amount of alcohol, 1–3% abv.

In some cultures, instead of germinating the maize to release the starches therein, the maize is ground, moistened in the chicha maker's mouth, and formed into small balls, which are then flattened and laid out to dry. Naturally occurring ptyalin enzymes in the maker's saliva catalyse the breakdown of starch in the maize into maltose. This process of chewing grains or other starches was used in the production of alcoholic beverages in pre-modern cultures around the world, including, for example, some traditional forms of sake in Japan.

== Use ==
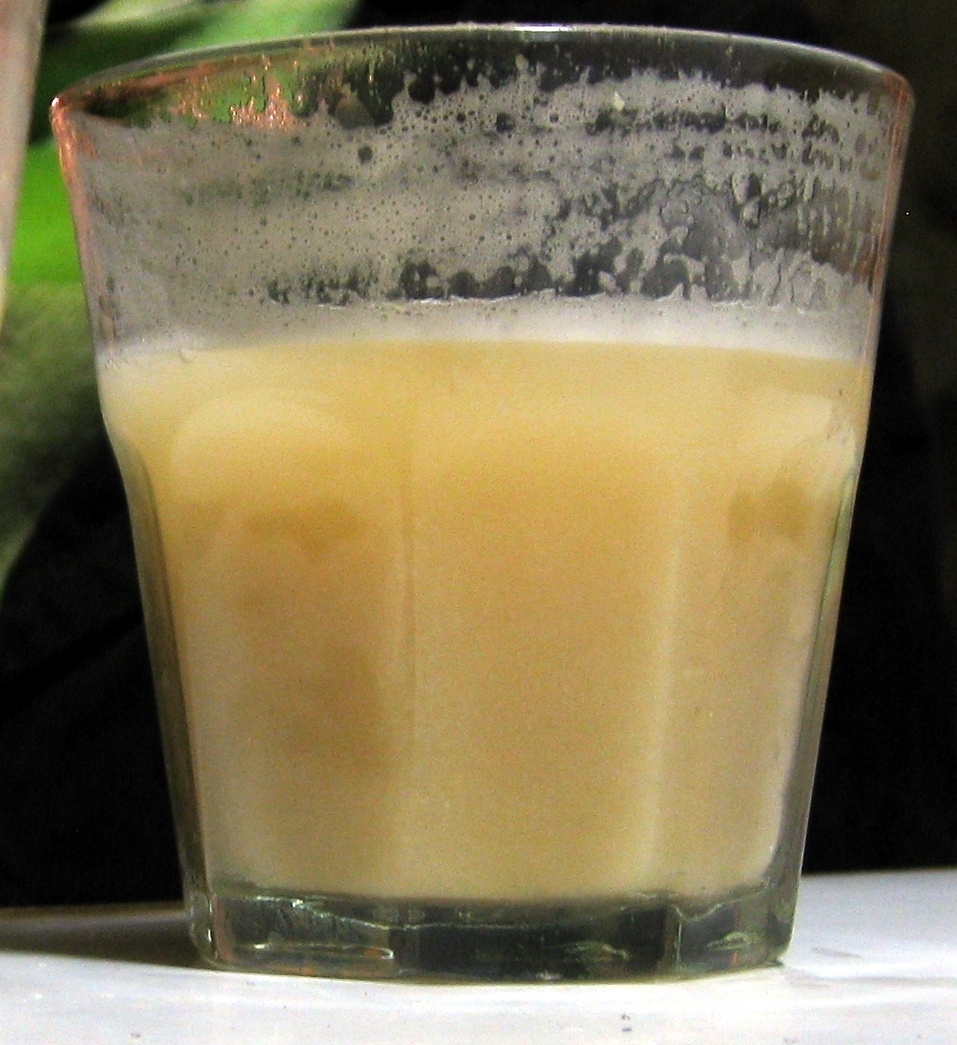
Chicha de jora

Chicha de jora has been prepared and consumed in communities throughout in the Andes for millennia. The Inca used chicha for ritual purposes and consumed it in vast quantities during religious festivals. Mills in which it was probably made have been found at Machu Picchu.

During the Inca Empire, women were taught the techniques of brewing chicha in Aqlla Wasi (feminine schools).

In recent years, however, traditionally prepared chicha is becoming increasingly rare. Only in a small number of towns and villages in Bolivia, Peru, Ecuador, Colombia, and in Costa Rica, is it still prepared.

It is still very popular throughout southern Peru, sold in every small town and the residential neighborhoods of the larger cities. Normally sold in 'chicherias' consisting of an unused room or a corner of the patio of a home, these generally unlicensed businesses can provide a significant boost to a family's income. They are generally identified by a bamboo pole sticking out the open door, adorned with (often red) flags, flowers, ribbons or colored plastic bags.

Normally sold in large caporal (1/2 liter) glasses to be drunk on location, or by the liter if it is taken home. Chicha is generally sold straight from the earthenware chomba where it was brewed. In the Cuzco area, the recipient will often first offer a libation, dripping a portion of the foamy head on the ground with the phrase "Pachamama, santa tierra" (Pachamama is Quechua for "Earth Mother". Santa tierra is Spanish for "blessed ground"), a tradition dating from the time of the Spanish conquest. This tradition of spilling the first portion of the beverage (including beer) is a "brindis" or "toast" common in the highlands of Bolivia as well (including the capital La Paz), is explained as giving the first fruits to Mother Earth.

Chicha de Jora is reputed to be an anti-inflammatory on the prostate. Chicha may be mixed with Coca Sek, a Colombian beverage made from coca leaf.

== See also ==
- List of maize dishes
- Chicha
- Chicha morada
- Kuchikamizake
- Peruvian cuisine
