= Peruvian cuisine =

Culinary traditions of Peru

Peruvian cuisine refers to the culinary and gastronomical traditions of Peru, which originated in the pre-Columbian indigenous populations in its three main geographical regions along the Pacific coast, the Andes and the Amazonian areas. Some of the fare blends traditions that came after the arrival of the Spaniards in the 1530s, with immigrants from Europe (Spanish cuisine, Italian cuisine, and German cuisine), Asia (Chinese cuisine and Japanese cuisine), the Middle East, and Africa (Maghrebi cuisine and West African cuisine). Lacking ingredients often available in their original countries, these immigrants blended their recipes with those locally available in Peru.

The four traditional staples of Peruvian cuisine are corn; potatoes and other tubers; Amaranthaceae (quinoa, kañiwa and kiwicha); and legumes (beans and lupins). Staples brought by the Spanish include rice, wheat and meats (beef, pork and chicken).

Many traditional foods—such as quinoa, kiwicha, chili peppers, and several roots and tubers—have increased in popularity in recent decades, reflecting a revival of interest in native Peruvian foods and culinary techniques. Chef Gastón Acurio has become well known for raising awareness of local ingredients. The most important ingredient in Peruvian cuisine is the potato, as Peru has the widest variety of potatoes in the world.

American food critic Eric Asimov has described it as one of the world's most important cuisines and an exemplar of fusion cuisine, due to its long multicultural history.

== History ==
Peruvian cuisine reflects the influences of indigenous ingredients and techniques, the viceregal era, and immigration from Europe, Africa and Asia.

=== Pre-Columbian era ===
Local ingredients included potatoes, aji pepper, corn, quinoa and various Andean grains. By this time, sophisticated agricultural techniques had been developed that allowed the local inhabitants to grow and cultivate crops in the challenging terrain of the Andes.

=== Colonial era ===
The arrival of the Spanish in the 16th century brought about significant changes to Peruvian cuisine. The Spanish brought with them new ingredients, such as onions, garlic, and various meats, and introduced new cooking techniques, such as frying and sautéing.

=== African and Asian influences ===
In the late 19th century, Peru experienced an influx of African and Asian immigrants who brought with them their culinary traditions. African slaves introduced dishes such as tacu-tacu, a mix of rice and beans that was fried and served with steak or eggs. Chinese immigrants created dishes such as lomo saltado, a stir-fry of beef, onions, tomatoes, and French fries, which has become a popular dish in Peru and globally.

=== Modern era ===
Peruvian cuisine is known around the world with some of its the most distinguishable ingredients being aji amarillo peppers, huacatay herb, and Peruvian corn. In 2004, the Peruvian government launched the "Gastronomy Project" to promote the country's culinary traditions and encourage the development of the country's restaurant industry. In 2008, the Peruvian government declared June 28 as "National Ceviche Day" in recognition of the dish's importance to Peruvian cuisine.

== Crops ==
Peru is considered an important center for the genetic diversity of the world's crops:

- Potatoes. Many varieties of potato are native to the Andes mountains. Over 99% of all cultivated potatoes worldwide are descendants of a single subspecies, namely Solanum tuberosum. This subspecies has developed into thousands of varieties that vary by size, shape, color, and other sensory characteristics.

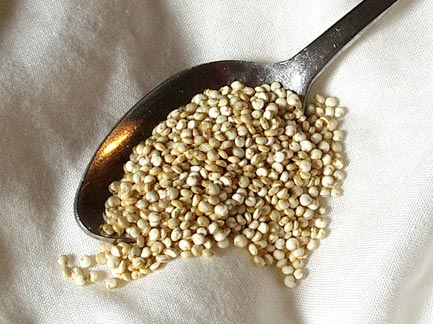
Quinoa

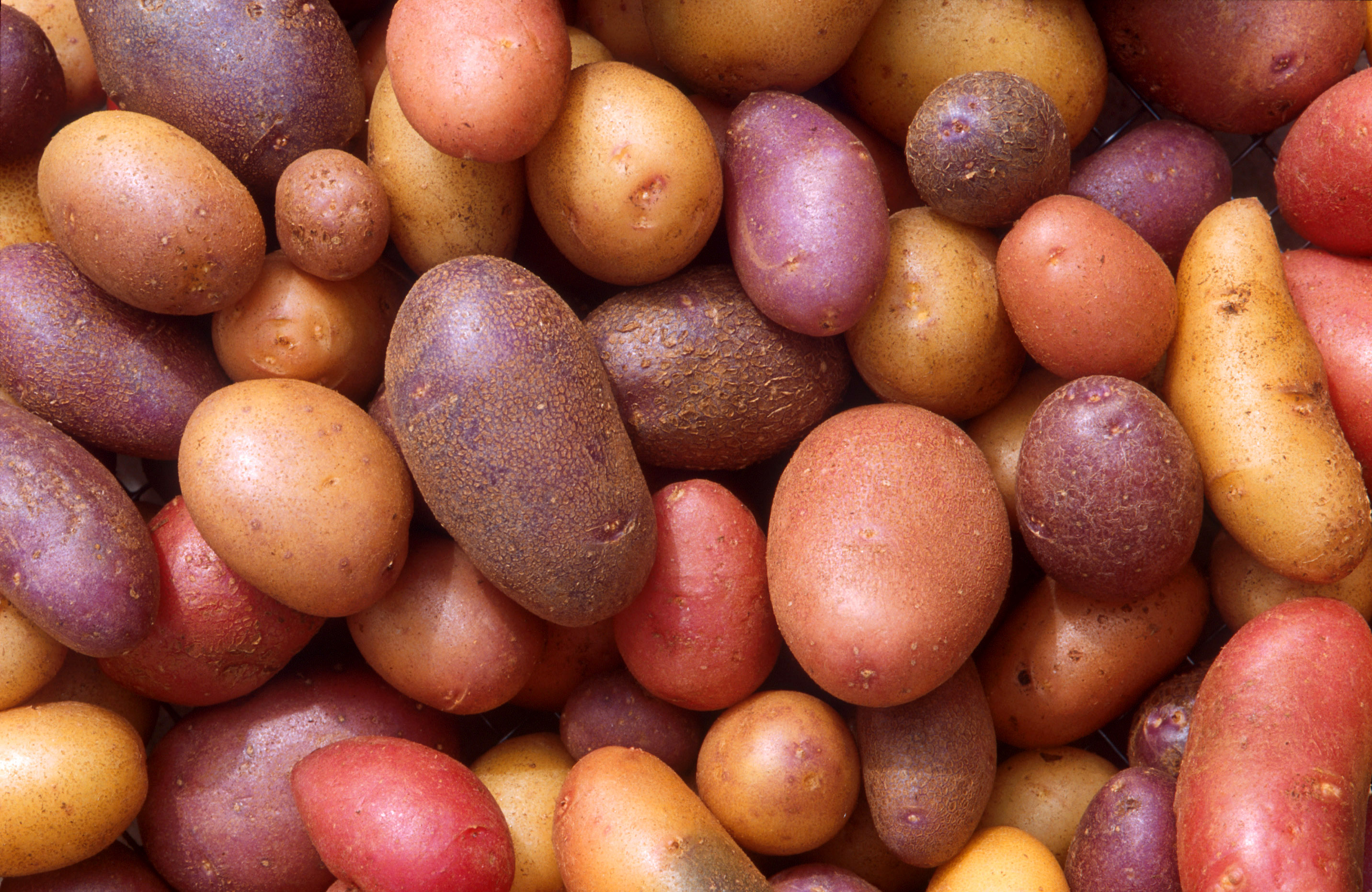
Peruvian potatoes

- Quinoa, three varieties
- Kaniwa
- Tarwi, a legume native to the Andes which is similar to the lupin bean
- Lima bean
- Maca
- Oca, a potato-like tuber
- Mashua, a potato-like tuber
- Ulluco, a potato-like tuber
- Caigua, a vegetable with a cucumber-like taste
- Capsicum baccatum chile peppers, including ají amarillo and ají limón
- Capsicum pubescens, rocoto chile
- Capsicum chinense, ají panca and ají mochero/limo
- Fruits—Peru has about 20 native fruits that are used in cooking or eaten fresh

The sweet potato is native to the Americas and was domesticated there at least 5,000 years ago. Two varieties of sweet potato are commonly available for sale in the markets, but there are more varieties around the country. One has dry orange flesh and light tan skin and tastes sweet. The other has purple skin, is white and brown inside, and is only moderately sweet. Occasionally another variety, characterized by small tubers and dark skin, is available.

Among the fruits native to the Andes region in general (Peru, Bolivia) are lúcuma, camu camu, prickly pear, cape gooseberry, cocona, pacay, guanabana, dragon fruit, pepino, papaya, ciruela, mammee apple, banana passionfruit, cherimoya, granadilla, moriche palm fruit, and tamarillo. Yacon, although an underground tuber, is also used as a fruit. Usually, none of the other native fruits are commercially available.

From Peru, the Spanish brought back to Europe several foods that became staples for many cultures around the world.

- Potatoes: Potatoes were introduced to Europe from the Americas. They were considered livestock feed in Europe until French chemist Antoine-Augustin Parmentier began serving dishes made from the tubers at his lavish banquets. His guests were immediately convinced that potatoes were fit for human consumption. The varieties used in Europe and most of the world, however, derive from a subspecies indigenous to the Peruvian Andes, Solanum tuberosum.
- Beans: Several varieties of the common bean are native to Latin America including the lima bean.

The varieties of chili peppers, potatoes, tomatoes and maize that the Spanish brought back to Europe, however, were native to Peru:

- Peppers: Chili peppers are native to America. The varieties most commonly used around the world, however, derive from Mexico and Central America. Sweet Peppers are native to Mexico and Central America. Peruvian Ají peppers are virtually unknown outside of the Andean region of South America.
- Maize: Maize ("Indian" corn), is native to Mesoamerica and Peru; the varieties used in Europe and most of the world are from Central America. The corn grown in Peru is sweet and has large kernels. However, it is not widely consumed outside of Peru.
- Tomatoes: The wild ancestor of the tomato, Solanum pimpinellifolium, is native to western South America both in the Peruvian and Ecuadorian Amazon.

Many foods from Spain are now considered Peruvian staples, including wheat, barley, oats, rice, lentils, chickpeas (garbanzo beans), broad beans, garlic, cabbage, broccoli, cauliflower, artichokes, onions, cucumbers, carrots, celery, lettuce, eggplant, wine, vinegar, olives, beef, pork, chicken, numerous spices (including coriander, cumin, parsley, cilantro (green coriander), laurel, mint, thyme, marjoram, turmeric, cloves, cinnamon, nutmeg, anise (fennel), black pepper and oregano), bananas, quince, apples, oranges, limes, apricots, peaches, plums, cherries, melons, figs, pomegranates, honey, white sugar, almonds, walnuts, cheese, hen eggs, cow's milk, etc. Many food plants popular in Europe, however, were imported to Peru.

== Cultivation of ancient plants ==
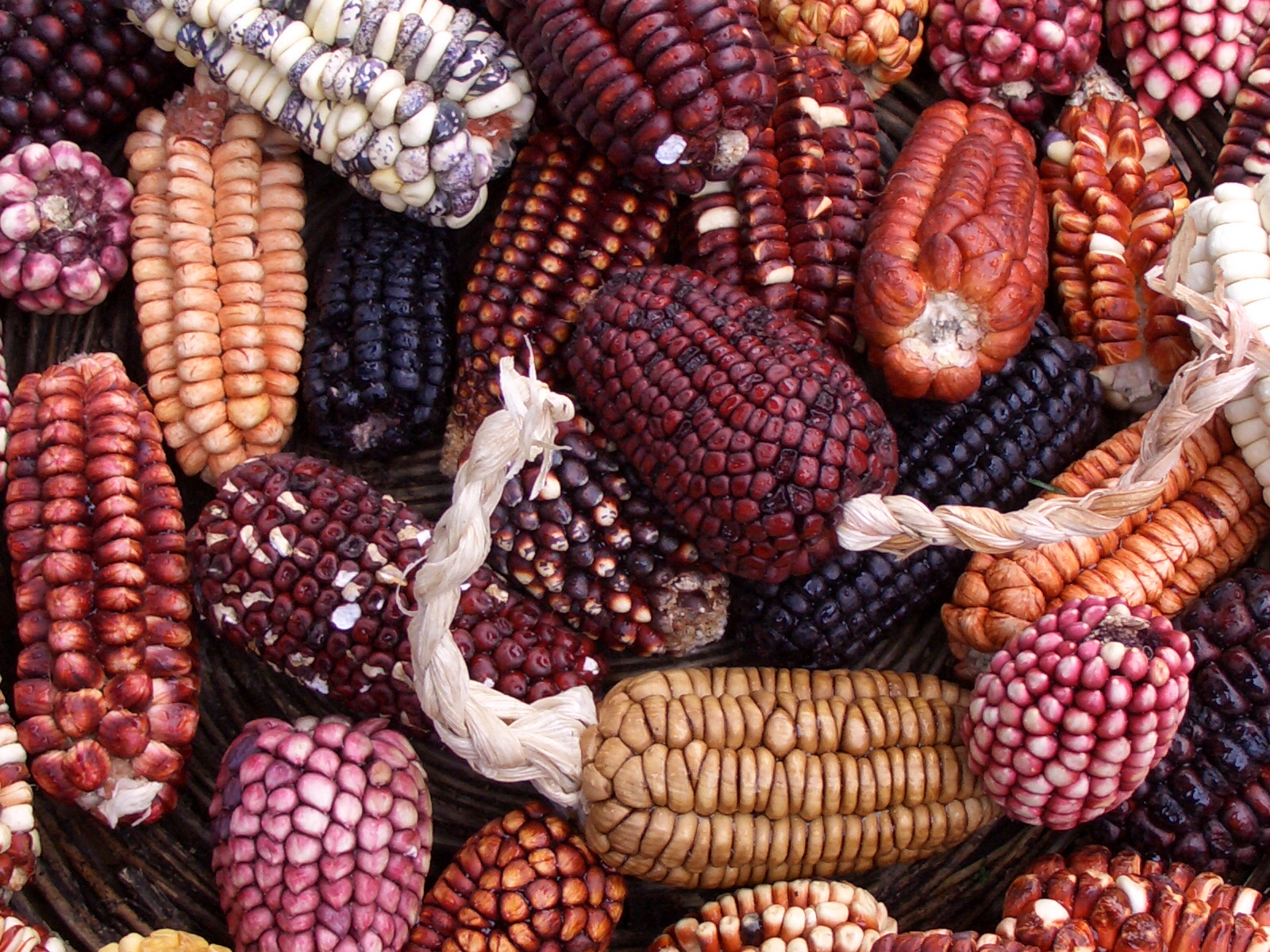
Peruvian corn

During the colonial period, and continuing up until the Second World War, Peruvian cuisine focused on Spanish models and virtually ignored anything that could be regarded as native or Peruvian. Traditional food plants, which the indigenous people continued to eat, were regarded as "peasant food" to be avoided. These colonial attitudes took a long time to fade. Since the 1970s, there has been an effort to bring these native food plants out of obscurity.

Some plants cultivated by ancient societies of Peru have been rediscovered by modern Peruvians, and are carefully studied by scientists. Due to the characteristics of its land and climate and the nutritional quality of its products, some Peruvian plants may play a vital role in future nutrition. Examples include quinoa (an excellent source of essential amino acids) and kañiwa, which look and cook like cereals but are pseudocereals. Nutritionists are also studying root vegetables, such as maca, and cereals like kiwicha.

Since 1985, NASA has used some of these foods—quinoa, kiwicha and maca—for astronaut meals. Andean ingredients like tubers and quinoa (kinwa in the indigenous language Quechua) have also been promoted by members of Peru's Ministry of Culture and received international endorsements from celebrities like Oprah Winfrey and NASA as a new type of superfood. While Peruvian state actors and celebrity chefs argue that these efforts have created economic opportunity for rural farmers and built international cultural awareness, the commercialization of Andean ingredients has decreased crop biodiversity on indigenous lands. Heightened global demand has caused prices to increase so that these ingredients are becoming less accessible to the native Peruvians.

For many of Peru's inhabitants, these food stocks allow for adequate nutrition, even though living standards are poor. Abandoning many of these staples during the Spanish domination and republican eras lowered nutritional levels.

Peruvian cuisine is often made spicy with ají pepper, a basic ingredient. Peruvian chili peppers are not always spicy but serve to give taste and color to dishes. Rice often accompanies dishes in Peruvian cuisine, and the regional sources of foods and traditions give rise to countless varieties of preparation and dishes.

== Regional differences ==
Peru is a country that holds not just a variety of ethnic mixes since times ranging from the Inca Empire, the Viceroyalty and the Republic, but also a climatic variety of 28 individual climates. The mixing of cultures and the variety of climates differ from city to city so geography, climate, culture and ethnic mix determine the variety of local cuisine.

=== Coastal areas ===
The Pacific Ocean is the principal source of aquatic resources for Peru. Peru is one of the world's top two producers and exporters of unusually high-protein fishmeal for use in livestock/aquaculture feed. Its richness in fish and other aquatic life is enormous, and many oceanic plant and animal species can only be found in Peru. As important as the Pacific is to Peru's biodiversity, freshwater biomes such as the Amazon River and Lake Titicaca also play a large role in the ecological make-up of the country.

Every coastal region, being distinct in flora and fauna populations, adapts its cuisine in accordance to the resources available in its waters.

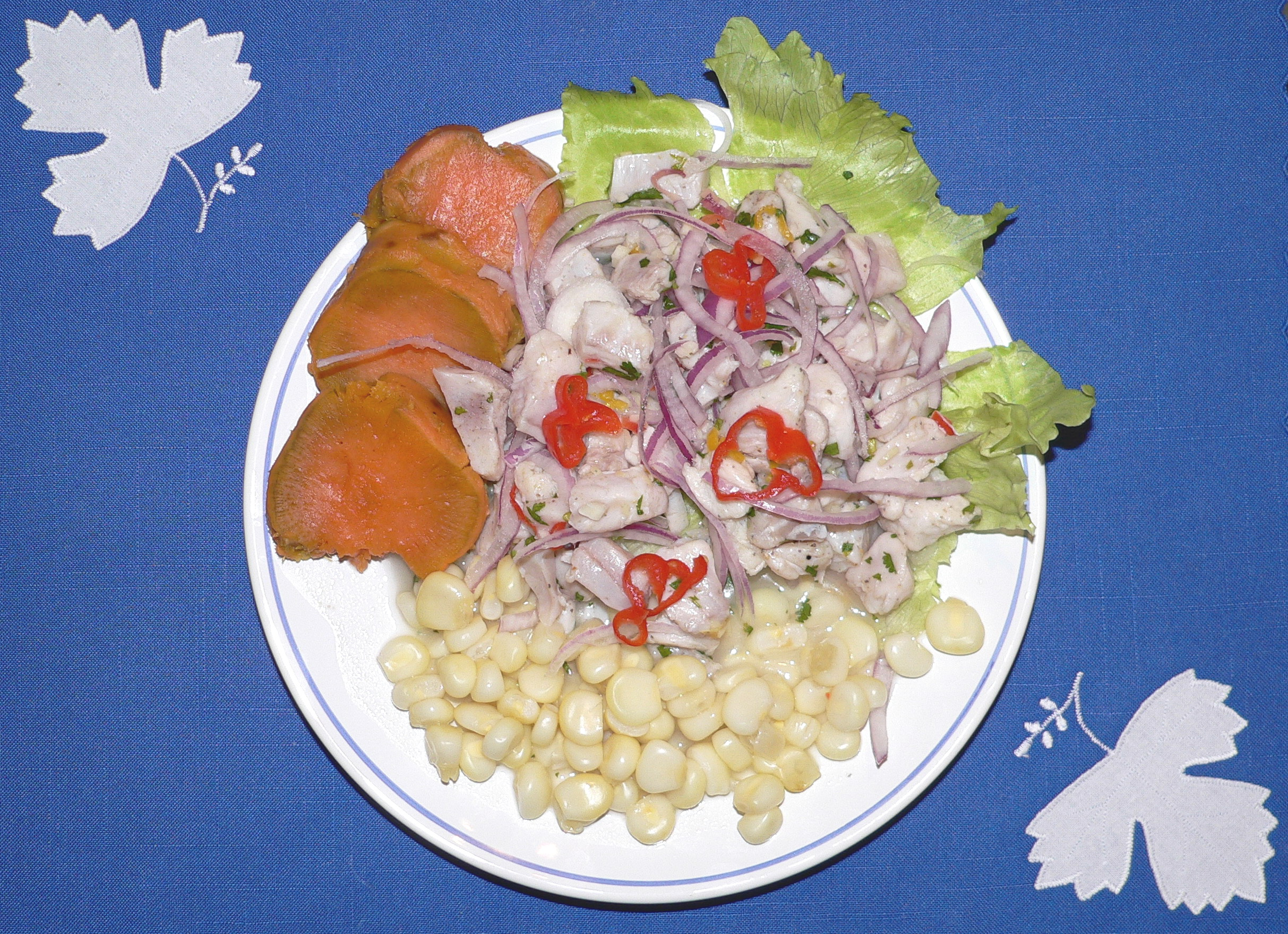
Peruvian ceviche platter

Ceviche, a Peruvian dish of marinated raw fish or seafood typically garnished with herbs and served as an appetizer, with many variations (pure, combination, or mixed with fish and shellfish), provides a good example of regional adaptation. Ceviche is found in almost all Peruvian restaurants on the coast, the shortly marinated seafood morsels are typically served with camote (sweet potato), and kernels of Peruvian choclo serrano. It can also be spelled "cebiche" in Peru. It is the flagship dish of coastal cuisine, and one of the most popular dishes among Peruvians. Ceviche marinade consists of Andean chili peppers, onions, and juices from an aromatic lime variety brought by the Spaniards. Before the Spanish colonists came to Peru, the Moche marinated seafood using fermented juice prepared from local banana passionfruit called Tumbo. Once the Spanish colonists arrived and brought with them citrus fruits, locals started using citrus to marinate their seafood. Ceviche is a spicy dish that consists generally of bite-size pieces of white fish (such as corvina or white sea bass), marinated raw in lime juice mixed with chilis. Ceviche is often served with raw onions, boiled sweet potatoes (camote), and toasted corn (cancha).

Many Peruvians believe that ceviche is an aphrodisiac and hangover cure, the latter possibly due to the fact that it is traditionally consumed with beer. Unlike the adaptations of ceviche made in Mexico and Ecuador, in Peru it is not made with tomatoes. Also popular is Leche de tigre (tiger's milk), which is the Peruvian colloquial name for the marinade used in ceviche. It has a light spicy flavor.

Chupe de camarones (shrimp cioppino) is one of the most popular dishes of Peruvian coastal cuisine. It is made from a thick freshwater shrimp (crayfish) stock soup, potatoes, milk and chili pepper. It is regularly found in Peruvian restaurants specializing in Arequipan cuisine.

A center of immigration and centers of the Spanish Viceroyalty, Lima and Trujillo have incorporated unique dishes brought from the arrival of the Spanish Conquistadors and the subsequent waves of immigrants. Besides international immigration—a large portion of which happened in Lima—there has been, since the second half of the 20th century, a strong internal flow from rural areas to cities, in particular to Lima. This has strongly influenced Lima's cuisine with the incorporation of the immigrants' ingredients and techniques.

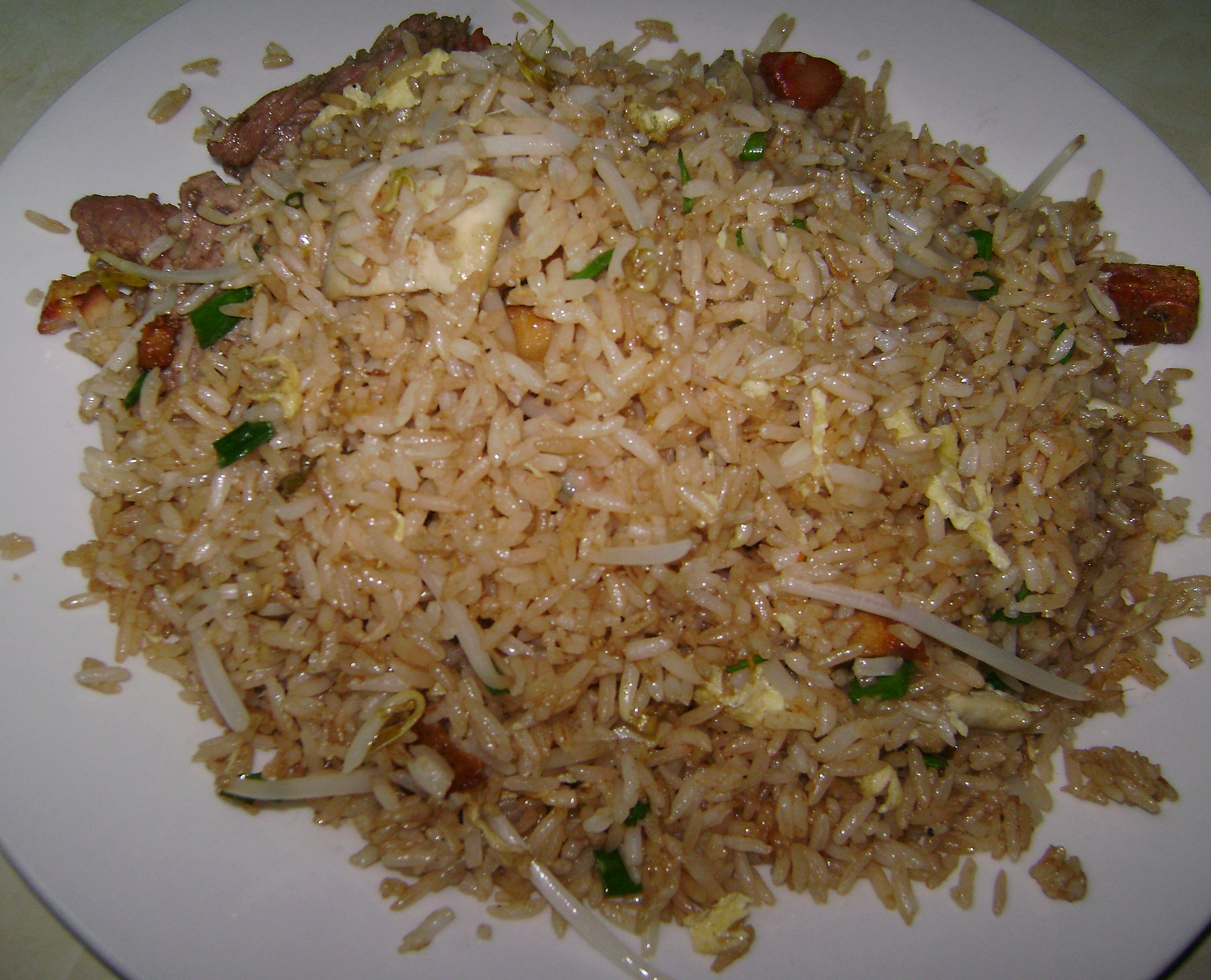
Arroz Chaufa, is a localized version of chaofan, or Chinese fried rice.

Creole cuisine is the most widespread in this cosmopolitan city. Lima hosts a wide variety of international cuisines, with Italian and Chinese (known locally as chifa, a Chinese-Peruvian fusion) being the most popular. Rice is one of the foods brought to Peru from Spain. Arroz Chaufa, which is Peruvian fried rice is one popular Peruvian dish. It is made of peppers, onions, garlic, soy sauce, eggs, chicken, sesame oil, ginger, and cumin. It is Peru's version of Chinese fried rice. Japanese food, especially sushi, is also very popular, and many chain restaurants from the United States have a significant presence as well. Offerings of Arabic, Thai, Mexican, French, English, Argentine, Brazilian, and Indian cuisine can also be found in multiple locations throughout the city of Lima.

The city's bakeries are quite popular with Peruvians. One may find Peruvians standing in line in almost every bakery waiting for freshly baked white bread from 6 to 9 am and from 4 to 6 pm. The majority of Peruvians tend to eat bread for breakfast along with coffee or tea. Almost all bread in Peru, with the exception of baguettes, is fortified with added fats, such as lard. Whole wheat bread is extremely hard to find in the major cities, but more common (and often cheaper) in rural towns. Many bakeries sell white bread sprinkled with bran for health conscious customers as whole wheat flour is extremely hard to find. However, even this bread is often heavily fortified with lard, shortening or butter. Authentic whole wheat bread is imported from Europe and sold at upscale grocery stores. A few coastal cities bakeries produce "bollos," which are loaves of bread baked in stone and wood-ovens from the Andes.

Anticuchos are brochettes made from beef heart marinated in various Peruvian spices and grilled, often with a side of boiled potato or corn. They are commonly sold by street vendors, but one may find them in creole food restaurants.

Also frequently sold by street vendors are tamales: boiled corn with meat or cheese and wrapped in a banana leaf. They are similar to humitas, which consist of corn mixed with spices, sugar, onions, filled with pork and olives and finally wrapped in the leaves of corn husks. Tamales are a common breakfast food, often served with lime and "Salsa Criolla" which is a mixture of thinnly sliced raw red onion, ají peppers, cilantro and lime juice.

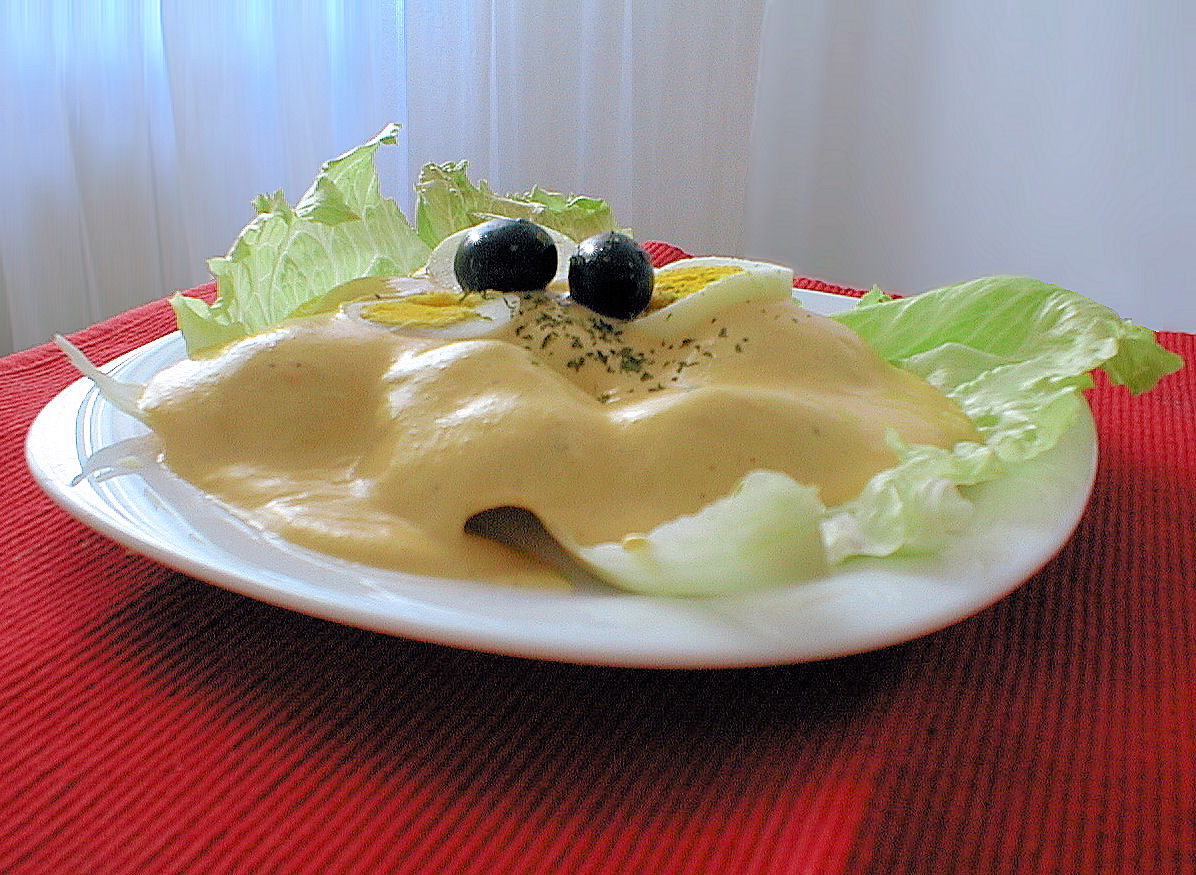
Papa a la huancaina (Huancayo-style potatoes)

Another favorite food found in many restaurants is Papa a la huancaina (Huancayo-style potatoes), a dish consisting of sliced boiled potatoes, served on a bed of lettuce with a slightly spicy cheese sauce with olives. The dish is cheap to make and uses ingredients that are readily available in Peru, yet it has complex flavours and textures so is very popular with chefs in restaurants in Peru. This combination of being cheap to make, yet favored by chefs, has helped Papa a la Huancaina become popular across all classes of Peruvian society. The name of the dish is from Huancayo, a city in Peru.

Tacu-tacu: Mixture of beans, rice and a fried egg, on top of breaded or pan-fried steak and a Salsa Criolla.

Papa rellena (stuffed potato): mashed potatoes stuffed with ground (minced) meat, eggs, olives and various spices and then deep fried.

Arroz tapado (covered rice): uses the same stuffing of papa rellena, but rather than used as a stuffing, it is accompanied by rice.

Pollo a la Brasa (Peruvian-flavored rotisserie or roaster chicken): is one of the most consumed foods in Peru. It is roasted chicken marinated in a marinade that includes various Peruvian ingredients, baked in hot ashes or on a spit-roast. The origins of the recipe for this dish date back to Lima, the capital of Peru, during the 1950s. Two Swiss citizens who were Peruvian residents, Roger Shuler and Franz Ulrich, invented and registered the patent (1950) for the machine to cook the chicken on the grill, a mechanical system of planetary rotation in that the chickens rotating on its axis and over a central axis, simultaneously. The dish comes with French fried potatoes, salad and various creams (Peruvian mayonnaise, ketchup, olive sauce, chimichurri and aji (chili) sauces of all kinds). There are many famous brands of "Pollo a la Brasa" restaurants in Peru and particularly in Lima, the most famous and popular being Hikari, Norky's, Roky's, Pardo's, and La Leña.

Sancochado is a hearty beef and vegetable broth that includes yuca (cassava) and potatoes.

A local staple is Lomo Saltado, also known as saltadito. Sliced beef (tenderloin or in Spanish "lomo") is stir-fried with, garlic, cumin powder, tomato and Spanish onion and fried-mixed with already fried French cut potatoes, coriander and parsley and accompanied with white rice. Salt and black pepper is also added to taste.

Arroz con pollo, or rice with chicken, is enjoyed for its rich-flavored rice combined with chicken.

Chupe de pescado or fish cioppino is popular in Lima and along the coast.

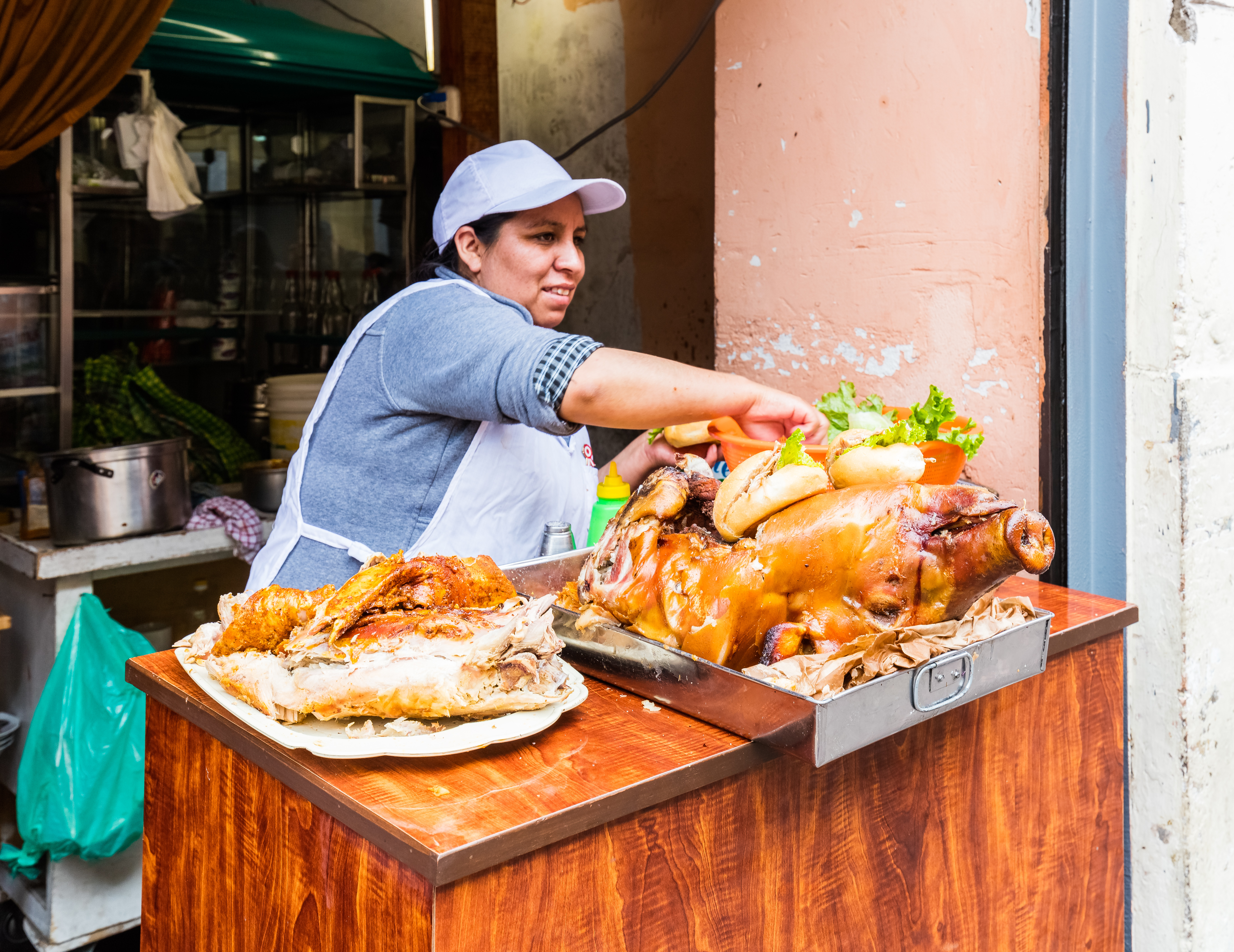
Street food stand in the center of Lima.

Lima butter bean salad is a salad made with Lima butter beans (called pallares in Perú), cooked whole, cooled, and mixed with a mixture of onion, tomato, and green ají, marinated in lime juice, oil, salt, and vinegar. Lima butter beans (pallares) have been part of the Peruvian cuisine for at least 6,000 years.

Butifarras, also known as Jamon del Pais, is a sandwich with "Peruvian ham", sliced onions, sliced chili peppers, lime, salt, pepper, oil, in a white bread roll.

Causa, in its basic form, is a mashed yellow potato dumpling mixed with key lime, onion, chili and oil. Varieties can have avocado, chicken, tuna or even shellfish added to the mixture. Also, causa is popular in Lima, where it is distinguished by the name Causa Limeña. Causa is usually served cold with hard boiled eggs and olives.

Carapulcra is an appetizing stewed dish of pork and chicken, dried potatoes, red chilis, peanuts and cumin. The version from the Afro-Peruvian Ica region uses fresh potatoes.

Empanadas (meat turnovers) were introduced by the Spanish during the colonial period, and later modified, possibly due to lack of Spanish ingredients (olive oil, codfish, smoked paprika, etc.). In Peru, they are filled either with chicken, beef, or cheese. Olives, and sometimes hard boiled eggs and raisins gives them a unique taste.

Ají de gallina (chili chicken or Peruvian creamed chicken) consists of thin strips of chicken served with a creamy yellow and spicy sauce, made with ají amarillo (Peruvian yellow chilis), cheese, milk, bread. Occasionally walnuts are added on special occasions or at upscale restaurants due to its prohibitive cost in Peru. Traditionally the meat is from non-laying hens, but today almost exclusively made from more tender chickens.

Escabeche criollo (pickled fish): "Escabeche" when the word is used alone normally refers to fish escabeche. Other varieties can use duck or chicken. The escabeche dishes rely in the cooking on the heavy use of vinegar and onions together with other spices and chili.

Cau cau is a meal consisting of mondongo or tripe stew and accompanied by rice. There are a number of versions of Cau-Cau, as it is a style of cooking a choice protein. Two noteworthy styles are the creole style simply called Tripe Cau-Cau, and the Italian-Peruvian style. Creole style is made with strips of previously cooked tripe, seasoned with a mixture of sauteed onions, garlic, yellow aji, a pinch of turmeric, salt and pepper and cubes of boiled potatoes. The mixture is cooked together to blend the flavors and acquire consistency. It is then sprinkled with mint. Some add vinegar for added flavor before serving. The other common version is the Italian-Peruvian style. It consists of strips of precooked tripe sauteed with red onions, peeled tomatoes, tomato paste and dried mushrooms, usually Porcini. After the flavors combine, it is seasoned with parsley and mixed with fried potato just prior to serving. Some chefs add a few tablespoons of wine or pisco following the sauteeing.

Chicharrones is salted pork deep-fried in its own fat. There are at least two kinds of chicharrones: pork skins, a country style ribs that are first boiled, then rendered in their own fat until they brown into chicharrones. Other types of chicharrones including deep fried squid, and other seafoods. They can be served at any time of day, including breakfast.

The cuisine of the northern coast offers a difference in style from the central and southern varieties. This is not only due to the coastal native Indian influence (less Andean), the Spanish influence, and the African; but also to the warmer coastal seas, hotter climate and immense geographical latitude variety.

The widely different climates between Tumbes, Piura, Lambayeque, La Libertad, Cajamarca and San Martin contributes to the variety of dishes in these areas.

Northern style dishes:

Seco de Cabrito (goat stew, often substituted by lamb, chicken, or beef) is made in a pot after marinating in chicha de jora (corn beer) and spices including cilantro and garlic. This dish is most popular in the northern coast especially in Cajamarca and Lambayeque.

Seco de Chavelo (typically from Catacaos - Piura) is a type of seco that is made of cecina stewed and dried meat that has been clotted and dried along with bananas, yuca, aji panca (Capsicum chinense) and Clarito (from Chicha de Jora the Piurano style).

Cebiche de Conchas Negras (ceviche with black shells) is a dish of Piura and Tumbes is also popular along the southern coast of Ecuador as the territory previously was under Ecuadorian jurisdiction. In this version of ceviche, the seafood used in the dish should be black clams accompanied by toasted corn.

=== Andes ===
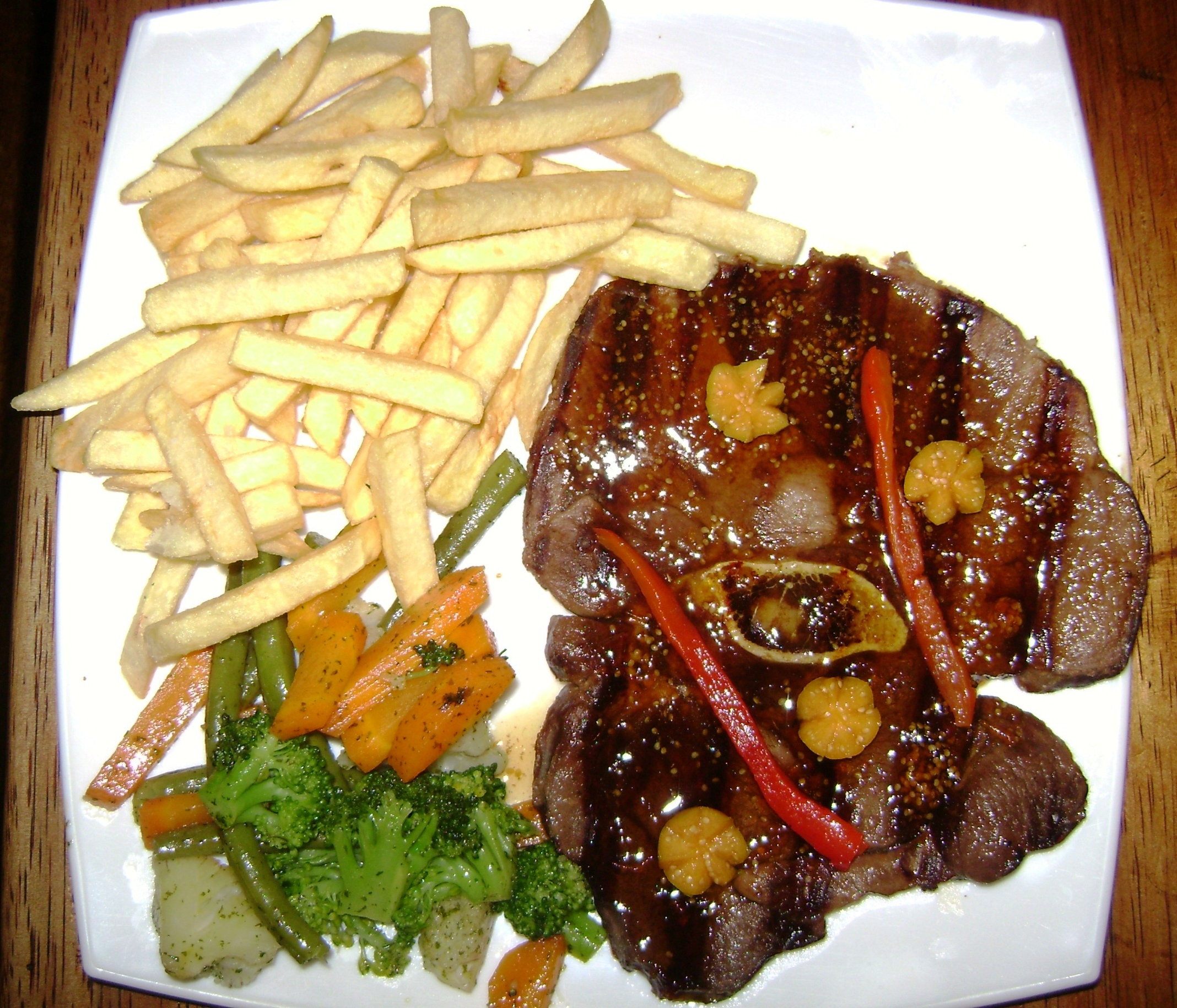
Alpaca with aguaymanto sauce

In the valleys and plains of the Andes, the diet is still a traditional one based on corn (maíz), potatoes, and an assortment of tubers. Meat comes from indigenous animals like alpacas and guinea pigs, but also from imported livestock like sheep, cattle and swine.

As with many rural cultures, most of the more elaborate dishes were reserved for festivities, while daily meals were simple affairs. Nowadays, festive dishes are consumed every day by urban dwellers, while rural diets tend to be light on meat and heavy on lahua gruel.

The pachamanca is a distinctive Peruvian dish. Cooked all over the Andean region of Peru, it is made from a variety of meats (including pork and beef), herbs, and a variety of vegetables that are slowly cooked underground on a bed of heated stones. Because of its tedious preparation it is normally only made for celebrations or festivals in the Andes, though recent years have seen the appearance of many "campestre" restaurants in rural areas outside Lima, such as in Cieneguilla.

Andean cooking's main freshwater fish is the trout, raised in fisheries in the region.

Cuy: Guinea pig, which is often served whole, or the meat can be used as filling for foods such as tacos and ravioli.

Cuy chactado: A dish more popular in the highlands is this meal of fried guinea pig. Often the indigenous women of the Peruvian Andes will raise the guinea pigs in their huts. Besides the use of guinea pigs as separate meals, they are often cooked in a Pachamanca with other meats and vegetables.

Olluquito con charqui is another traditional Andean dish. Olluco is a yellowish tuber (Ullucus tuberosus) domesticated by pre-Inca populations, and is visually similar to colorful small Andean potatoes, but with a distinct crunchy texture when cooked. Charqui is the technique employed in the Andean highlands to cure meat by salting, then dehydration (the word "jerky" in English is derived from this Andean (Quechuan) word). The dish is a stew of finely diced ollucos with charqui pieces (traditionally alpaca, or less frequently llama meat, though today it is also very commonly made from sheep), served with white rice.

Rocoto relleno: Arequipa dish made from stuffed rocoto chilis. Rocotos are one of the very hot (spicy) chilis of Peru. In this dish they are stuffed with spiced beef or pork, onions, olives, and egg white, then cooked in the oven with potatoes covered with cheese and milk.

Tocosh or Togosh is a traditional Quechua food prepared from fermented potato pulp.

Puka Pikanti: Ayacucho dish made from white potatoes, beets, yellow chili pepper, mint, and peanuts.

In Peruvian restaurants, steak is commonly served with rice rather than fries.

=== Amazon ===
Naturally, Amazonian cuisine is made using the products local to the Amazon rainforest. Although many animal species are hunted for food in the biologically diverse jungle, standouts are the paiche (one of the world's largest freshwater fish), prepared in variety of dishes; many other types of fish like gamitana, sabalo (Salminus hilarii, see Salminus), tucunare, boquichico, palometa, bagre, and many others including the piranha, that are prepared in variety of dishes such as "timbuche" (soup) or "patarashca" (grilled in vegetables); many types of turtles like the motelo (land turtle), and the charapa and taricaya (river turtles). Hunting turtles is prohibited in Peru, therefore turtle-based dishes are scarce and expensive and not sold à la carte in restaurants. Other animals include the majas, the sajino, the agouti and jungle mammals, which are called collectively "carne de monte". The black caiman is also considered a delicacy, but its hunt is forbidden under Peruvian law.

Among the fruits of Peru's jungle is the camu camu, which contains 40 times more vitamin C than the kiwifruit. Non-native fruits such as mango and pineapple and star apple are also in abundance, as well as other jungle fruits like, mammee apple, cherimoya, guanabana, taperiva, copoazu, dry fruits like the aguaje and the hungurahui.

Juane is rice seasoned with turmeric, and chicken wrapped with bijao leaves.

Chapo is a beverage made with sweet plantain.

== Other regional dishes ==
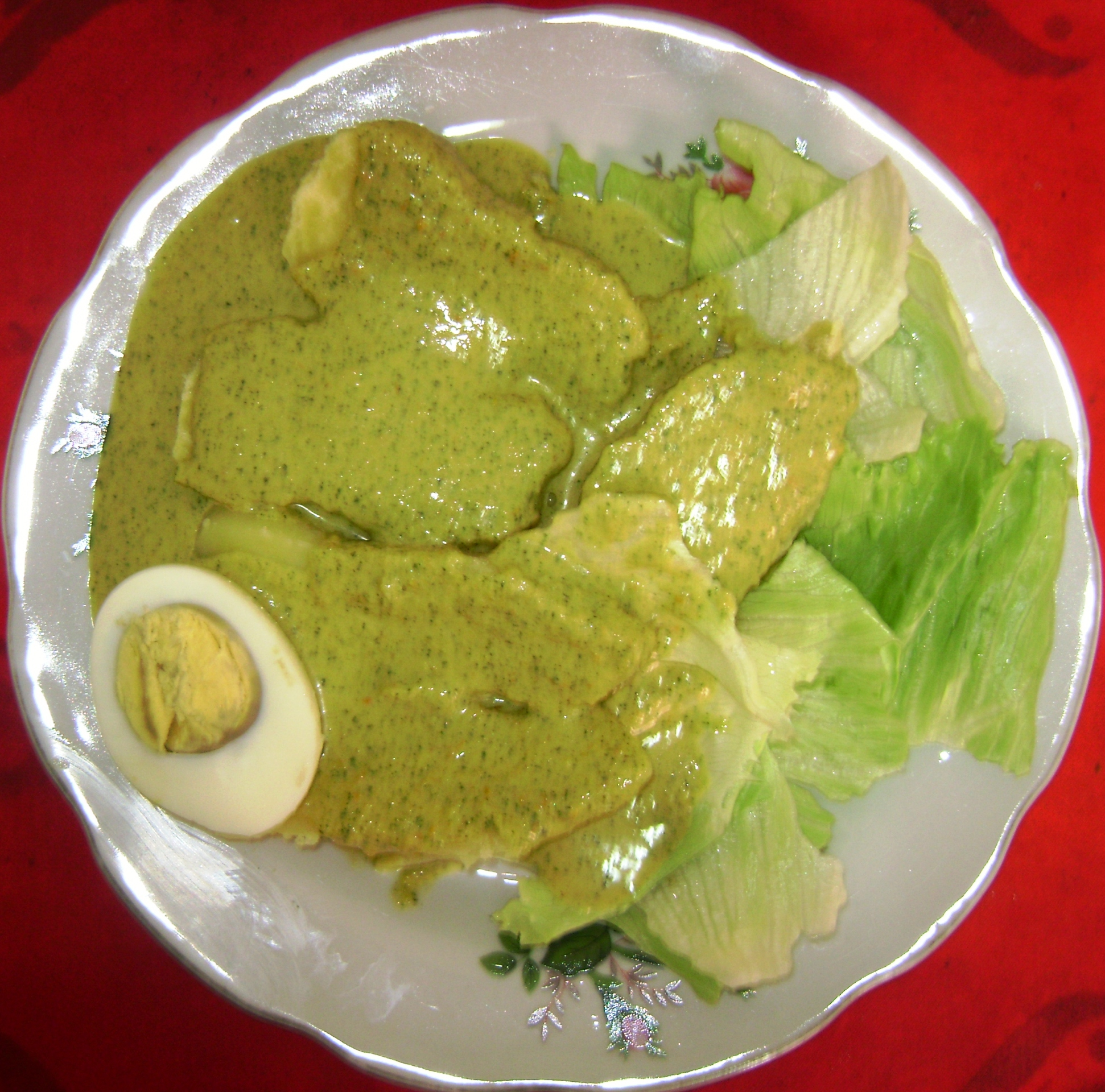
Ocopa

Chalona or charqui is a cured dried meat originally obtained from alpaca. It is also eaten in Bolivia, and was eaten by the Indigenous peoples on the coast and in the highlands of Peru before the arrival of the Spaniards. Today, lamb is often substituted for alpaca meat. It is used as an ingredient in a variety of dishes of the Puno region, Cusco, and Arequipa. It is prepared using recently cured lamb, in which furrows are made with a knife, so the salt can penetrate. Salt penetration is important, because it determines how long the cured meat lasts. The meat is left to dry in the sun and cold nights for almost one month.

Chairo: A traditional soup of the Puno and Arequipa regions. Its origins have been traced to the Collan Indians who live in the Andes of Bolivia and southern Peru. The soup consists of black chuño, aji panca (red chili pepper), sweet potatoes, sheep tripe and chalona.

Ocopa: A dish with some similarities to papas a la huancaina. It consists of boiled and sliced yellow potatoes covered with a sauce of made of aji (chili pepper), the Peruvian herb Tagetes minuta (called huacatay; the herb gives it a vivid green color), ground peanuts, and fresh or white cheese, with sides of lettuce, boiled eggs and olives. At expensive restaurants walnuts are often added, but this is seldom done in Peruvian homes due to the prohibitive cost of walnuts in Peru. The name ocopa is also used to refer to the hot sauce by itself.

Copús is one of the best-known dishes of Piura. Its ingredients are ripe fried bananas, camotes (sweet potatoes), and seasoned hen, turkey, goat, and mutton. The meat is cooked in a furnace under the ground; this method is different from using a pachamanca since the furnace is covered with blankets and clay.

Yuca chupe or cassava soup is one of the variations in which the Peruvians enjoy cassava.

Currently, ostrich meat is being raised on farms in Arequipa, although its consumption is not widespread and limited to urban areas.

Sangrecita: A dish of cooked chicken blood seasoned with garlic, onion, chilli and herbs and commonly served with potatoes, sweet potatoes or cassava.

Crema de tarwi (tarwi soup): Tarwi is a vegetable native to the mountains of Bolivia, Ecuador, and Peru. In addition to its use in soup, tarwi is used in much of Peruvian cuisine, including sancochado. Fresh tarwi can be used in stews, purees, sauces, desserts and in a variation of cebiche. In some areas, locals call it chocho. Its cultivation has recently expanded to all the countries of the Andean region. In Peru, it is principally grown in the areas of Cajamarca, Ancash, the Mantaro Valley, Ayacucho, Cusco, and Puno.

Tarwi can also be found in beverages (such as papaya juice with tarwi flour). Tarwi has been shown to have a higher vegetable protein content than soy. In pre-Incan and Incan times, it was an important part of the mostly vegetarian diet of the region. It was consumed with small quantities of meat and dried fish, providing an abundant source of protein for the population. Tarwi seeds have been found in Nazca tombs and in representations of Tiahuanaco ceramics.

== Chifa ==
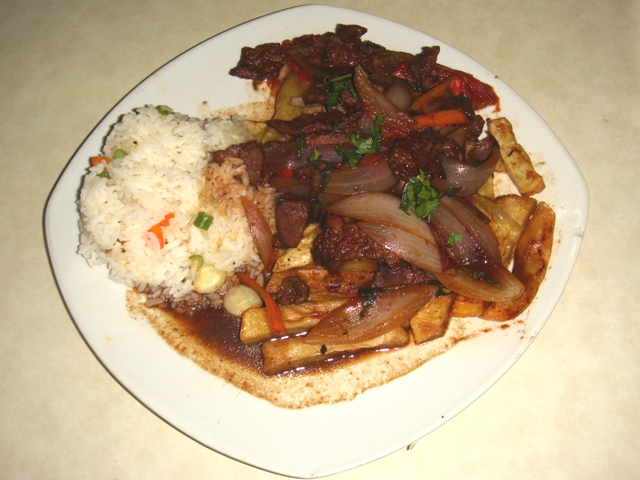
Lomo saltado

Chifa (from the Mandarin words 吃饭 "chī fàn", meaning "to eat rice") is the Peruvian term for Peruvian-Chinese food (or for a Peruvian-Chinese fusion restaurant). Because many Chinese ingredients are hard to find in Peru, the Chinese modified their cuisine and incorporated many Peruvian elements (mainly Spanish, native and African) into their cuisine, and the popularity of chifa has made it hard to find authentic Chinese cuisine in Peru.

== Sweet dishes and desserts ==
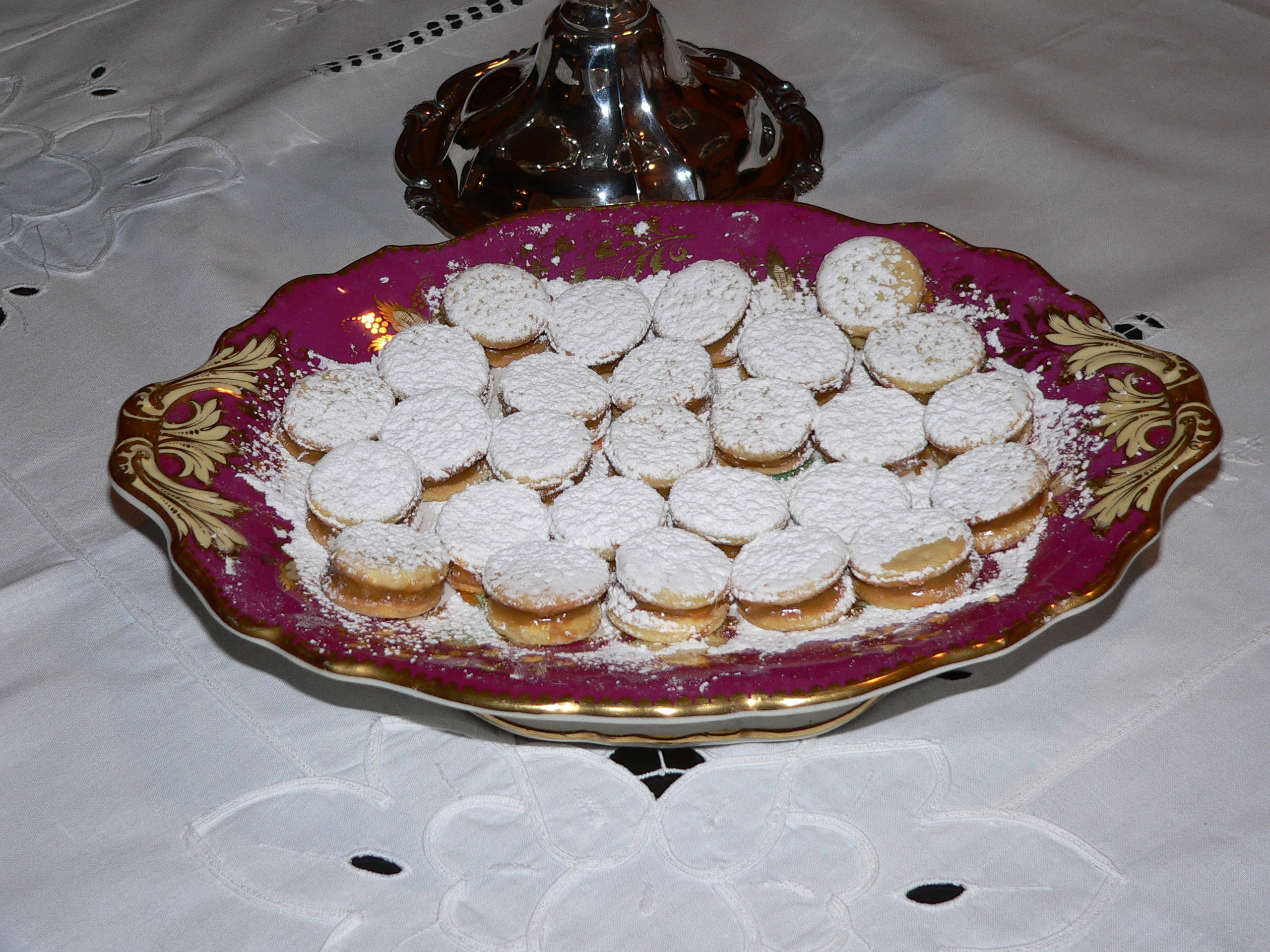
Small alfajores

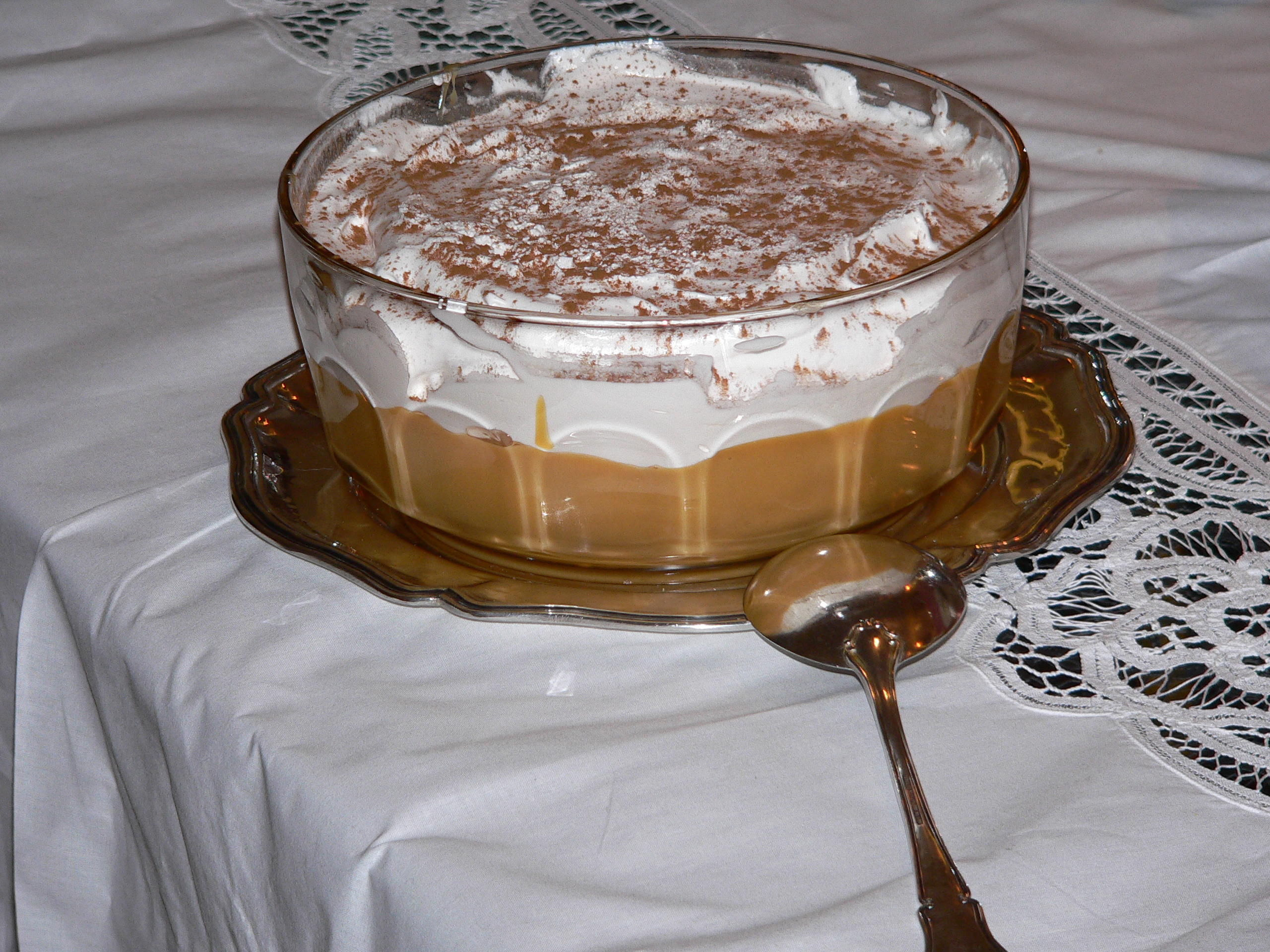
Suspiro a la limeña

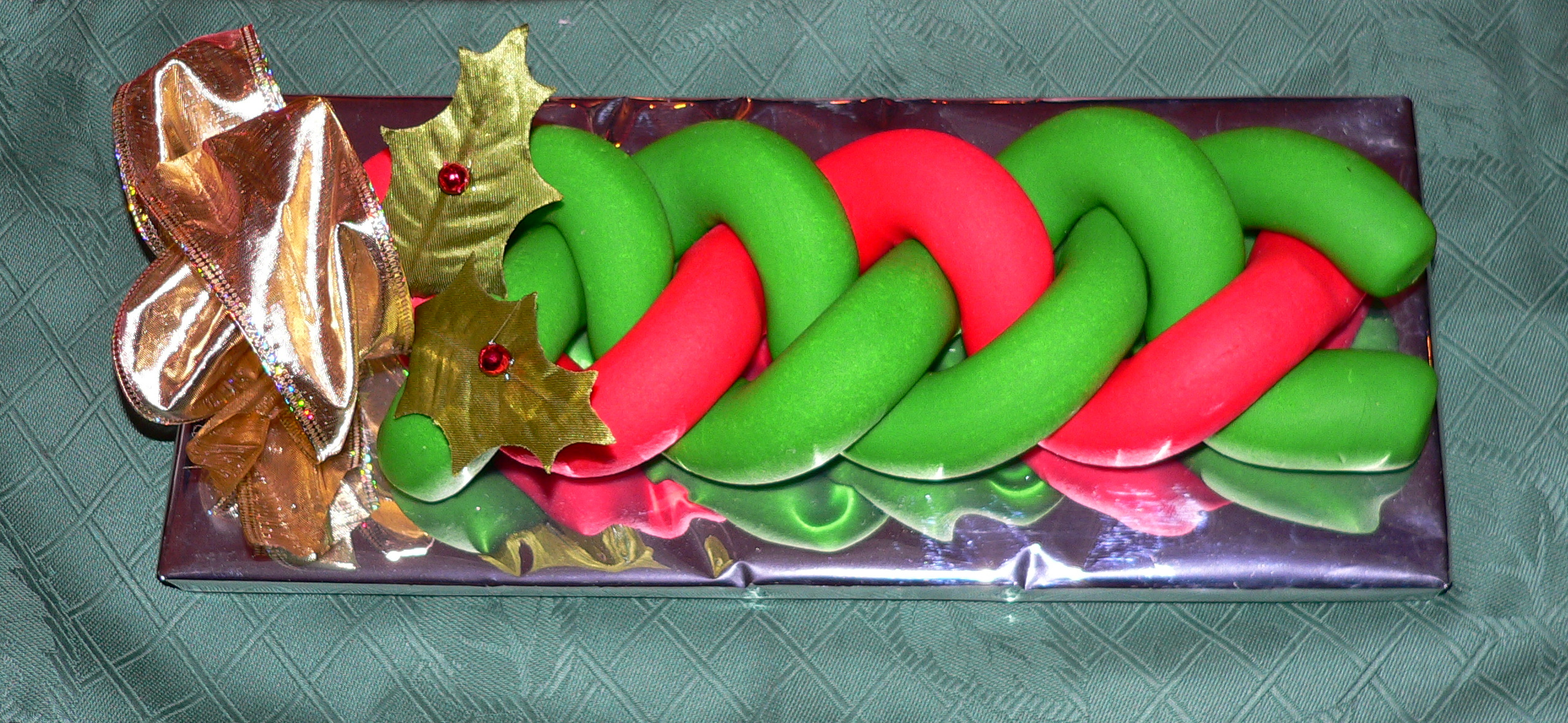
Maná for Christmas

Alfajores: a dessert found in virtually all of Spain's former colonies. It is derived from the versions popular in Spain during the colonial period. The original Spanish recipes, however, have been modified because the original ingredients are expensive in Peru (almonds, honey) or even unobtainable (hazelnuts, lemon rind, coriander seed, etc.). The basic recipe uses a base mix of flour, margarine, and powdered sugar, which is oven-baked. Alfajores consist of two or more layers of this baked pastry, and is usually filled with manjar blanco (a caramel-colored, sweet, creamy filling made with milk and sugar)

Turrones (or nougat) is another originally Spanish dessert. The original Spanish recipe, which contained ingredients that were rare or expensive in Peru (such as almonds, rose water, orange blossom water, honey) were modified in a variety of ways. One common variety found in Lima is Turrón de Doña Pepa, an anise and honey nougat that is traditionally prepared for the Señor de los Milagros (or Lord of Miracles) religious procession, during October.

Almost exclusive to the Andes region is the fruit known as lúcuma. Lúcuma juice, ice cream, and corresponding lúcuma shakes are very popular throughout Peru. Lúcuma ice cream can normally only be found in large US cities (typically in Peruvian restaurants). One popular brand of ice cream in Peru is D'Onofrio, which is owned by Nestlé.

Arroz con leche (rice pudding): Another dessert originally from Spain that can be found in various varieties throughout Latin America. Arroz con leche is one of the more common desserts found in homes and restaurants of modern-day Peru. It consists primarily of cooked rice, cinnamon/nutmeg, raisins, and milk. Rice pudding never has lemon rind as is traditional in the Spanish version. Arroz con leche is usually eaten with Peruvian Mazamorra (jelly-like clove-flavored dessert).

Helados (ice cream): The most common ice cream flavors found in Peru are lucuma, chocolate, vanilla and strawberry. Some more exotic flavors such as camu camu, guaraná and prickly pear can occasionally be found. For other commonly available flavors, however, one needs to purchase imported ice-cream as many of the ingredients are not available in Peru. Peru is one of few countries in the world where the third most popular ice-cream (after vanilla and chocolate) is not strawberry, it is in fact the "nutty" flavored, orange colored lúcuma, which is an exotic fruit grown in quantity only in Peru, and only in recent years being exported in very limited quantities as an exotic flavor (for ice cream and savory sauces) to the US, and available in Europe essentially in food shows.

Mazamorra morada: Is a jelly-like clove-flavored dessert. It takes on the color of one of its main ingredients: purple maize. A variety of purple corn (maíz morado) that only grows in Peru adds color to the water it's boiled in, along with cinnamon cloves. When the water cools, chopped fruit, key lime and sugar are added. The mixture is served as a beverage called "chicha morada".

Picarones: a sweet, ring-shaped fritter with a pumpkin base; often served with a molasses syrup. Picarones were created during the colonial period to replace the Spanish dessert Buñuelos, as buñuelos were too expensive to make (They had an egg custard filling) and some ingredients were unavailable (lemon rinds). Peruvian Picarones are made of squash or pumpkin dough and sweetened with chancaca, raw cane sugar melted into a syrup.

Tejas: another modified Spanish dessert. The original Spanish version contained ingredients that were prohibitively expensive in Peru, such as almonds. The Peruvian version of this candy is filled with manjar blanco and coated with a fondant-like shell. Some are also made with a chocolate shell (chocoteja).

King Kong: is made of cookies (made from flour, butter, eggs and milk), filled with milk candy, some pineapple sweet and in some cases peanuts, with cookies within its layers. It is sold in one-half and one kilogram sizes. It is known as part of the culture of Lambayeque Region.

Suspiro a la Limeña: Is another Spanish-influenced dessert that uses dulce de leche, which derives from the Spanish Blancmange. The bottom layer is made of dulce de leche enriched with egg yolks. The top layer consists of meringue made with port wine. This classic criollo dessert is said to have been named by the famous Peruvian poet and author José Gálvez whose wife doña Amparo Ayarez was famous for her cooking. When asked what inspired the name, he reportedly replied, "Because it is soft and sweet, like the sigh of a woman." In this case, it would be a woman from Lima, a Limeña.

Panetón: is a type of sweet bread with dried fruit. It is usually served for breakfast around Christmas with a cup of hot chocolate. They used to come in big boxes only with huge panetóns inside but now they also sell personal portions. Chocotón is variety of panetón that replaces the fruit with chocolate bits. The bread is very light and sweet. Because Christmas is the hottest time of year, people often replace the hot chocolate with coffee or a drink that's served cold.

Flan de leche is also a very popular dish.

Cachanga: Also known as a sopaipilla, sopapilla, sopaipa. This dessert is a kind of fried pastry and a type of quick bread that is usually prepared during breakfast time and contains cinnamon in its recipe. It is traditionally made from leavened wheat dough (or a mixture of wheat flour and masa harina) to which some shortening such as butter is added.

== Beverages ==
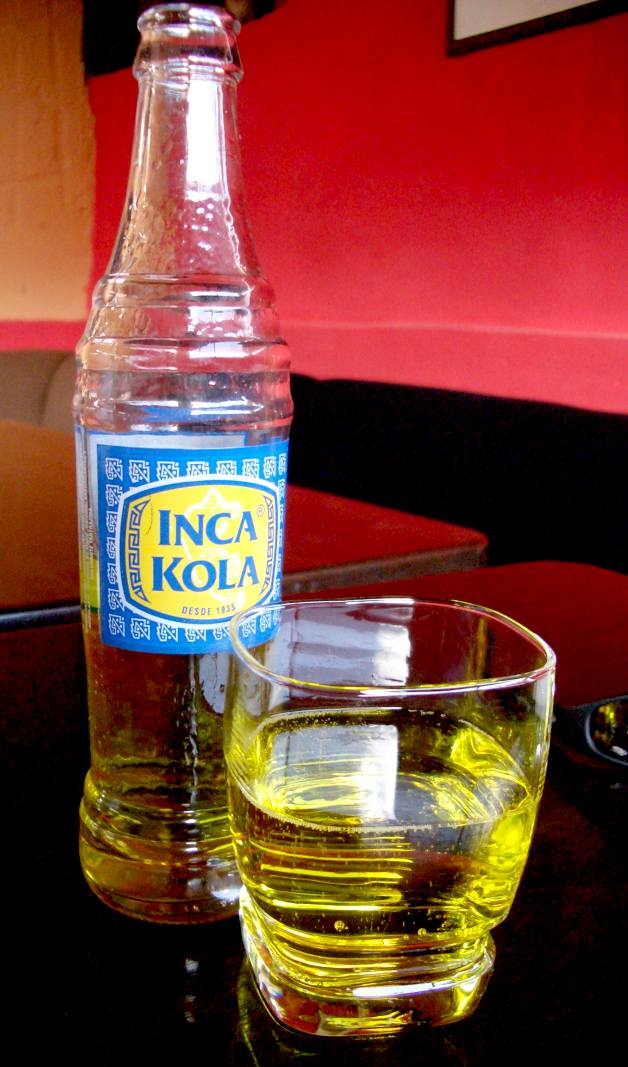
Inca Kola

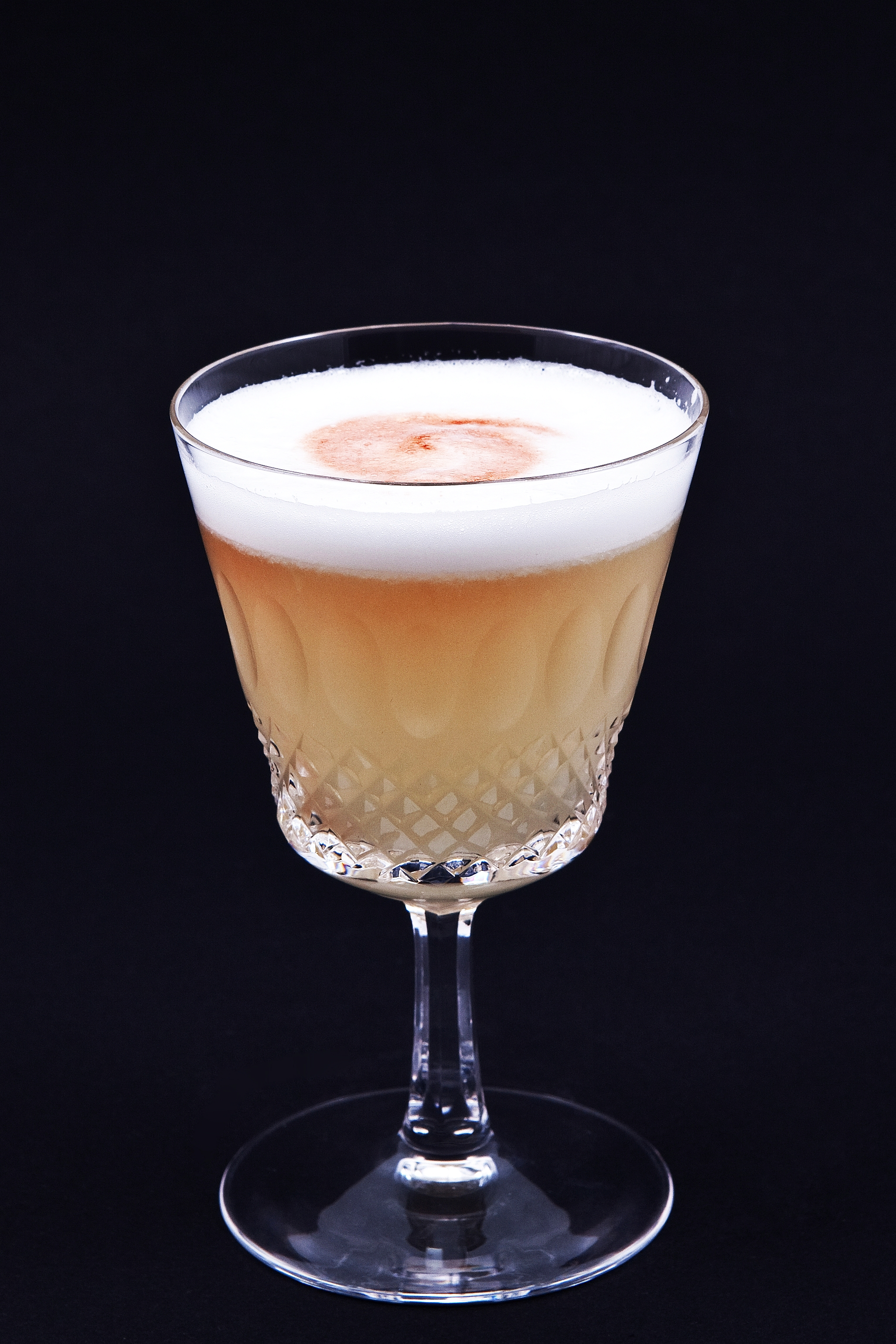
Pisco Sour

=== Soft drinks ===
The most commonly encountered soft drinks in Peru are:

- Chicha morada: a clove-flavored beverage prepared from a base of boiled purple maize and a generous amount of powdered cloves, to which sugar, cinnamon and ice are added as it cools. Occasionally chunks of pineapple are added. The taste is reminiscent of old-fashioned clove-flavored candy. Chicha de jora is a beer made with corn (see below)
- Inca Kola: a lemon verbena flavored soda (verbena de limon), which is a cultural icon, served from the most humble to the most exclusive tables nationwide. Yellow in color, it is very sweet (with a candy-like taste). Inca Kola beat out Coca-Cola in Peruvian sales, the only other national beverage apart from Irn-Bru in Scotland to beat Coca-Cola in the world. This is mainly due to nationalism prevalent among Peruvians, and an advertising campaign that capitalized on the fact that Inca Kola is a Peruvian product. In 1997, however, Coca-Cola acquired 49 percent of the Inca Kola company. Although exported to various countries, Inca Kola has not enjoyed major success elsewhere.
- Kola Inglesa: a cherry-flavored red soda introduced in 1912 by its English creator, Erin Stone.
- Kola Escocesa: a purple soda, traditional in the city of Arequipa. The beverage has been produced since the 1950s using mineral water.

Less common are:

- Refresco de camu camu: Refrescos are juices of various flavours mixed with water and sugar and often served with the set menu of the day at smaller restaurants. Besides camu camu, there are more common flavours such as orange. Pure juices, such as orange juice or grape juice, are seldom encountered in Peru due to their expense.
- Té de uña de gato: a tea made from a plant from the Amazon, cat's claw (Uncaria tomentosa), which is consumed for its supposed healing or medicinal properties.

=== Alcoholic drinks ===
Pisco, a type of brandy, is the national drink of Peru. It originated during the colonial period as a cheaper substitute for the Spanish liquor known as orujo. Nevertheless, orujo is a product made from the spoils of wine production. Pisco uses fresh grapes like wine-making. This distilled beverage made from grapes is produced in various regions of the country. Pisco Sour is a cocktail made from pisco combined with lime juice, egg white and simple syrup. Chilcano is also made with Pisco. Wines come from many different regions of the country, most notably from the Ica Region.

Beer, as in many countries, is popular at all levels of society. The first brewery was Pilsen Callao, which was established by a German immigrant in 1865. Other regional beers are Cristal, Arequipeña, Cusqueña and Pilsen Trujillo from Arequipa, Cuzco and Trujillo respectively; though Cuzqueña is popular nationwide and is exported worldwide. A common beer-drinking ritual among many Peruvian men involves a group sharing one glass. The party holding the bottle waits for the prior person to drink from the glass before receiving that glass, filling it and passing the bottle on to the next in line. While this custom is more common among men of lower classes of society, people of higher social status, particularly youth and occasionally women, take part in this custom for fun.

Chicha de jora is a corn-based alcoholic fermented beverage that originated in pre-Columbian coastal Peruvian indigenous cultures, and became more widespread during the height of the Incan Empire, as it was often consumed in mass during weeks of celebration. Different cultural regions would produce it in a mash that depended on different varieties of fermented maize and different aromatic herbs. While it is most popular today in the Andes region, it can still be found throughout markets across the country.

== History ==
The presence of the various altitudinal floors of the Andes mountain range in Peru and its proximity to the geographical equator allows the existence of a series of microclimates and species, from areas of usual snowfall to tropical forests. With 84 of the 104 climatic zones on the globe, it is one of the 12 countries in the world with the greatest mega-diversity. It has suitable conditions for growing fruits and vegetables throughout the year. Likewise, the Humboldt Current of cold oceanic waters that run through the Pacific Ocean off the Peruvian coast allows the existence of a great variety of fish and shellfish (Peru is one of the main fishing countries in the world).

Peru is a diverse country and that can be reflected in its food. Both immigration and the Spanish bringing in slaves from Africa contributed to some of Peru's diversity. In 1527 the Spanish started to bring people from Africa. 30 to 40 percent of Lima, Peru's population was of African descent. Women did domestic work or vended food. African influence played a role in shaping the national food heritage of Peru. A woman named Doña Josefa Marmanillo created turron or Turrón de Doña Pepa. She was an Afro- Peruvian slave who lived in Lima, Peru. Her dessert is eaten during the Señor de los Milagros (Lord of Miracles) feast that is celebrated every October. The month is also known as the purple month because of the procession colors. Another dessert eaten during the celebration is mazamorra morada (purple pudding).

Afro-Peruvians were one group that influenced Peru's food history. Marmanillo was skilled at cooking but became paralyzed in her arms. She went to the procession for Señor de los Milagros which means Lord of Miracles. The painting of Christ there was known to lead to miracles and healing. Indigenous artists would sometimes be paid to paint pictures of Christ on churches. After her visit, Marmanillo was healed. To show her gratefulness, she created a dessert called Turrón de Doña Pepa. The dessert had become part of a tradition and is eaten every October in Peru during the Lord of Miracles celebration. The dessert is still eaten today for the celebration. It is one of the world's largest Catholic ceremonies.

According to Elias et al (2022), the emergence and appearance of Peruvian gastronomy in the international market was produced through a reconversion that combined the local with the foreign. This was based on innovation aimed at enhancing its cuisine by applying international haute cuisine techniques supported by identity, cultural diversity and taking advantage of Peru's biodiversity.

In an article discussing the connection between food and heritage, cultural anthropologist, M. Cristina Alcalde states, “Food is now charged with Peruvian economic and social development, fast becoming a more attractive national marketing feature than Peru’s iconic Machu Picchu.” Alcaide is highlighting the importance of food in Peru's society. She also states that “Over and over again, Peruvians who returned to Peru and those living abroad referred to Peruvian dish as a source of pride and to their consumption as a way to feel and taste home.” Food can be seen as a form of national identity. Many Peruvians enjoy foods like ceviche, causa, ají de gallina, and lomo saltado.

== See also ==
- List of Peruvian dishes
- Andean cuisine
- Tourism in Peru
- Nikkei cuisine
- Chifa
- Novoandina
