= List of Peruvian dishes =

These dishes and beverages are representative of the Peruvian cuisine.

== Traditional dishes ==
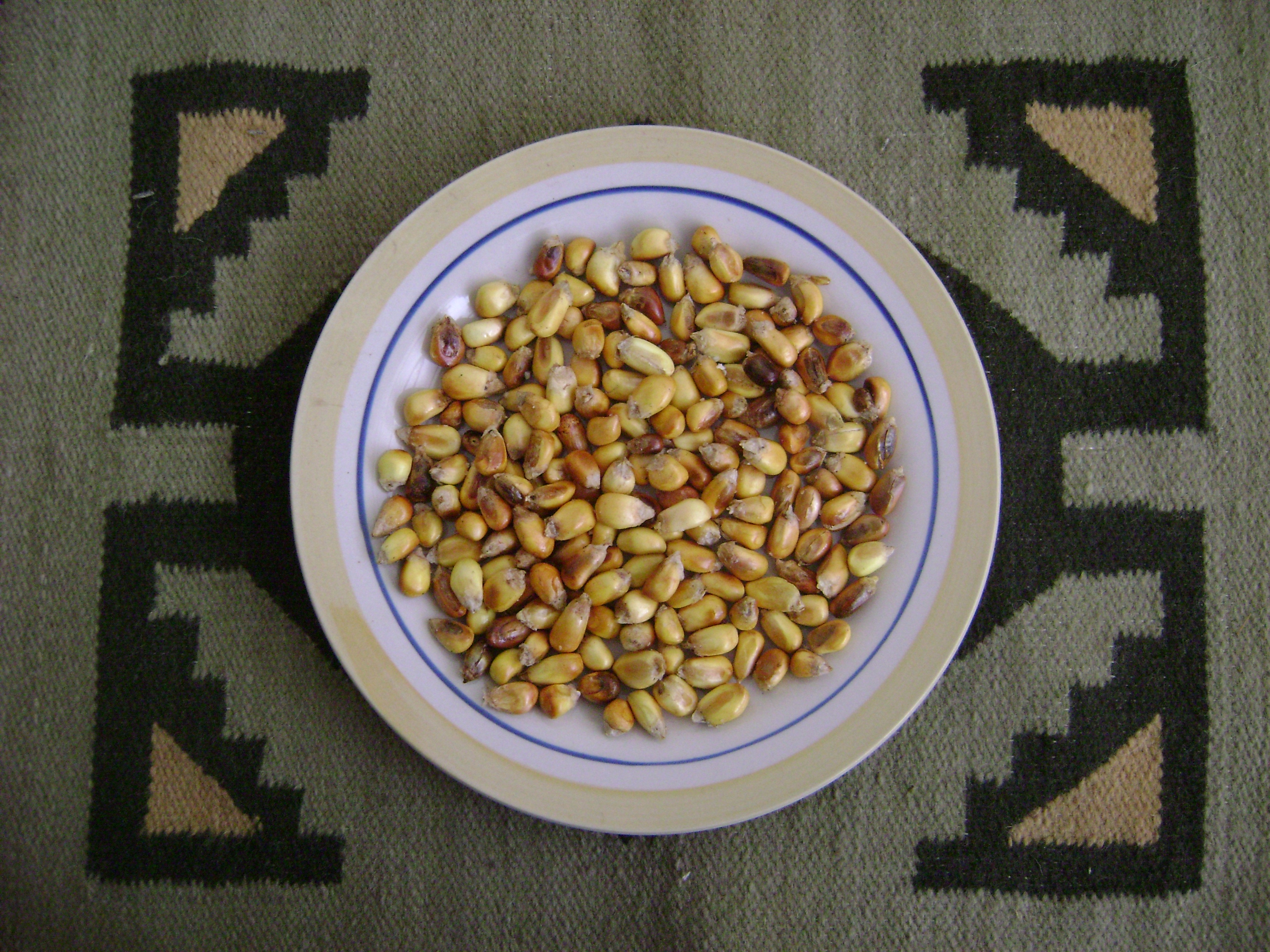
Cancha serrana

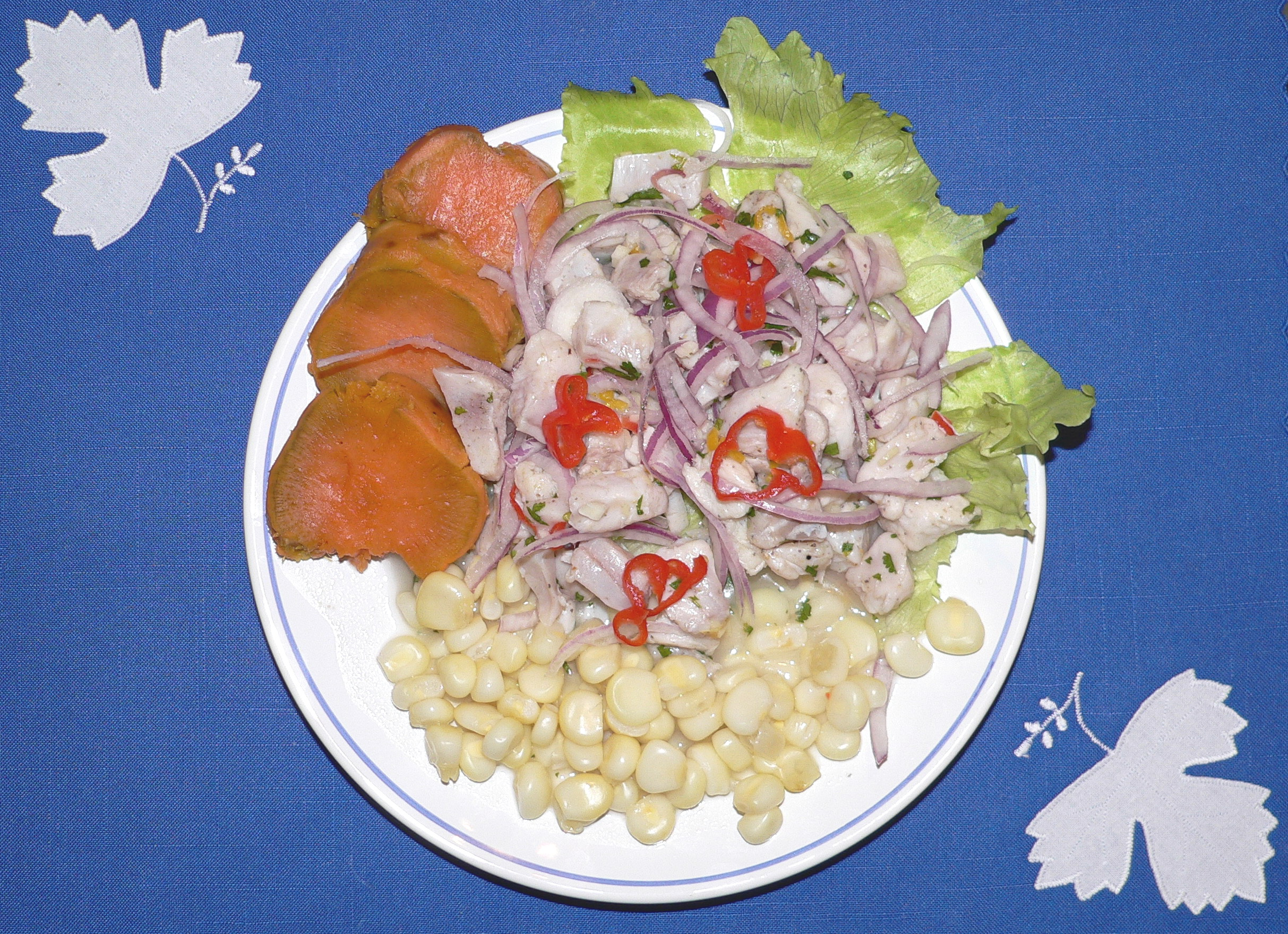
Ceviche with Peruvian fish

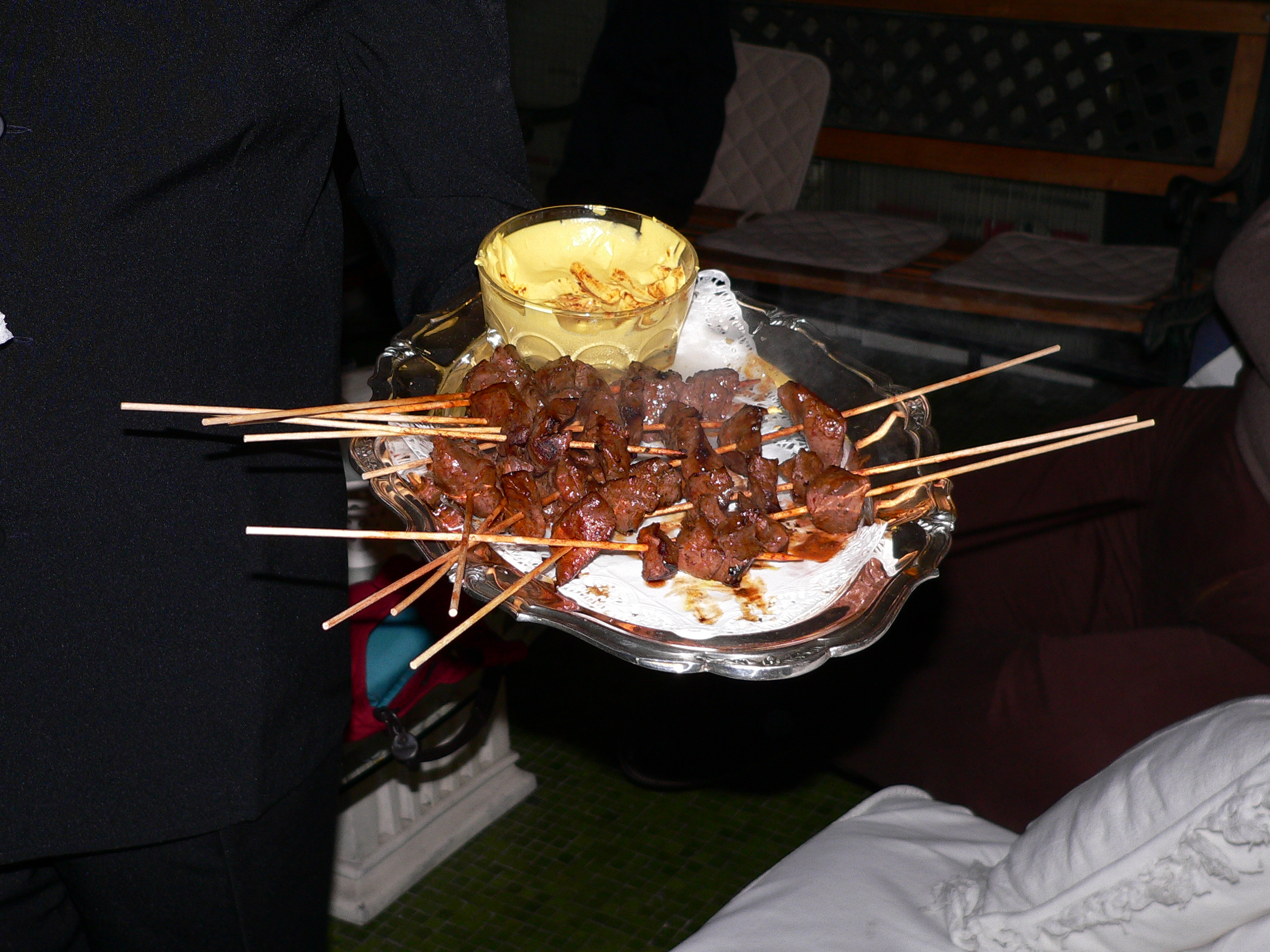
Anticuchos

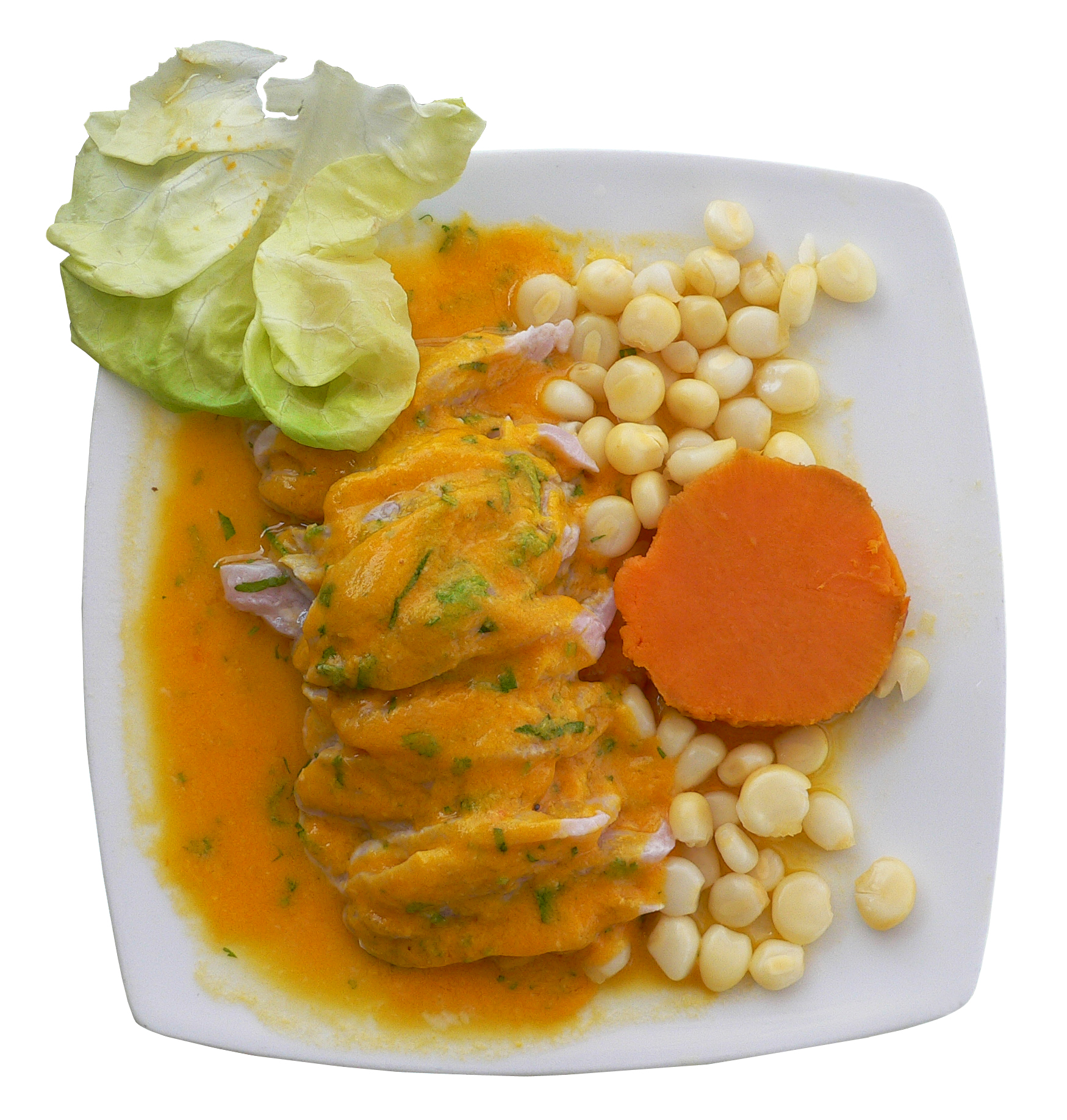
Tiradito of Lima

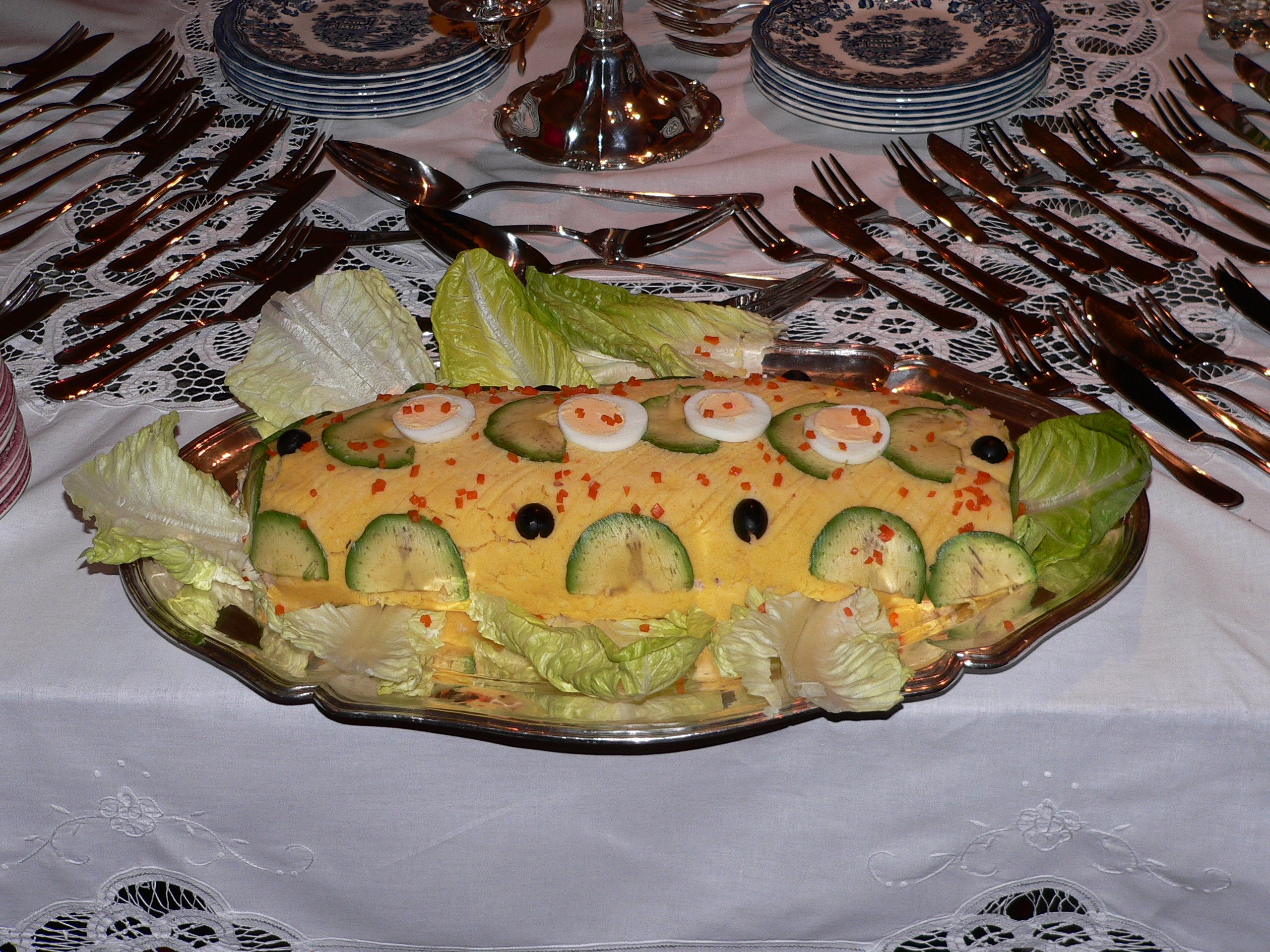
Causa limeña

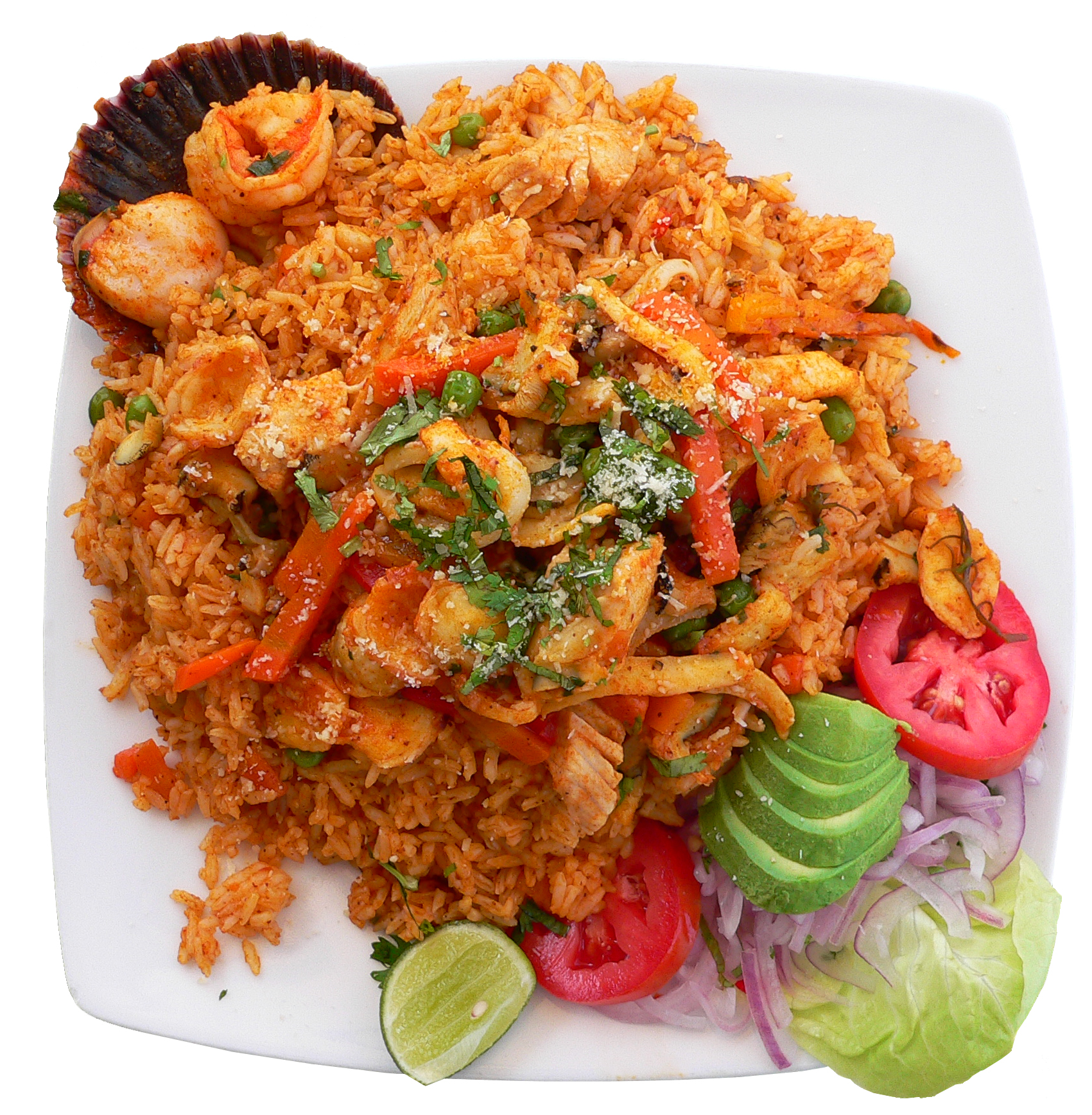
Arroz con mariscos a la limeña

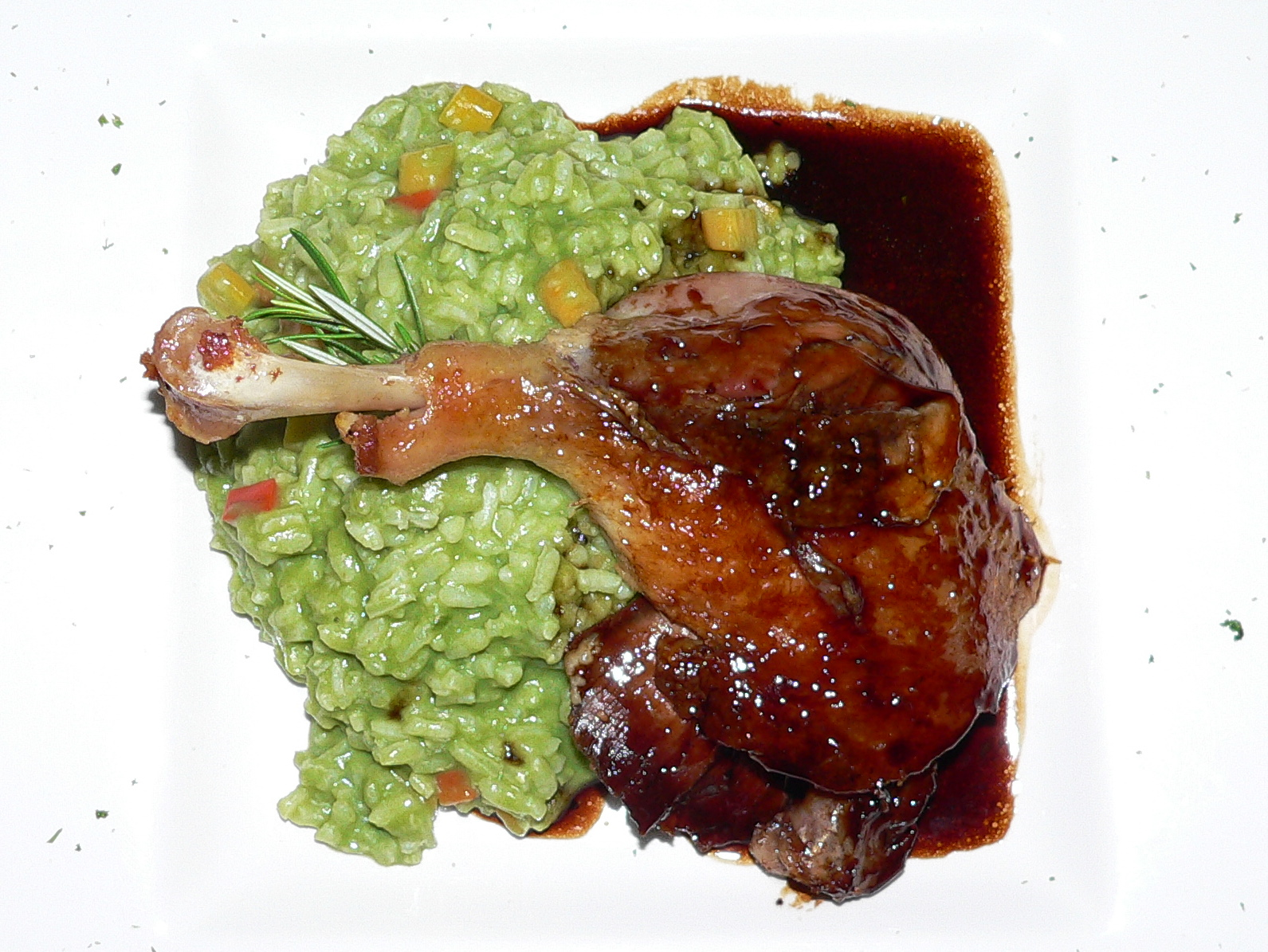
Arroz con pato of Lima

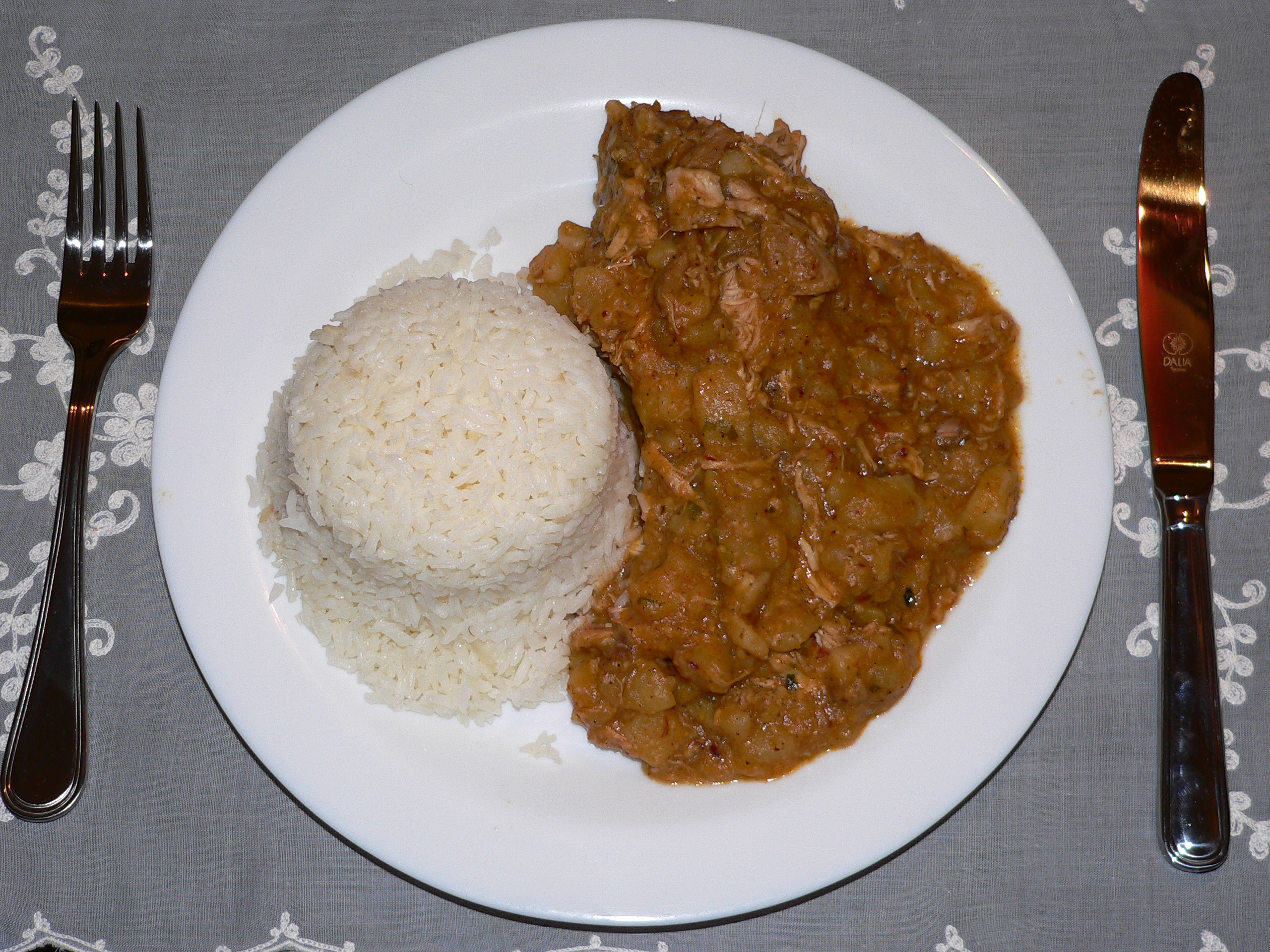
Carapulcra

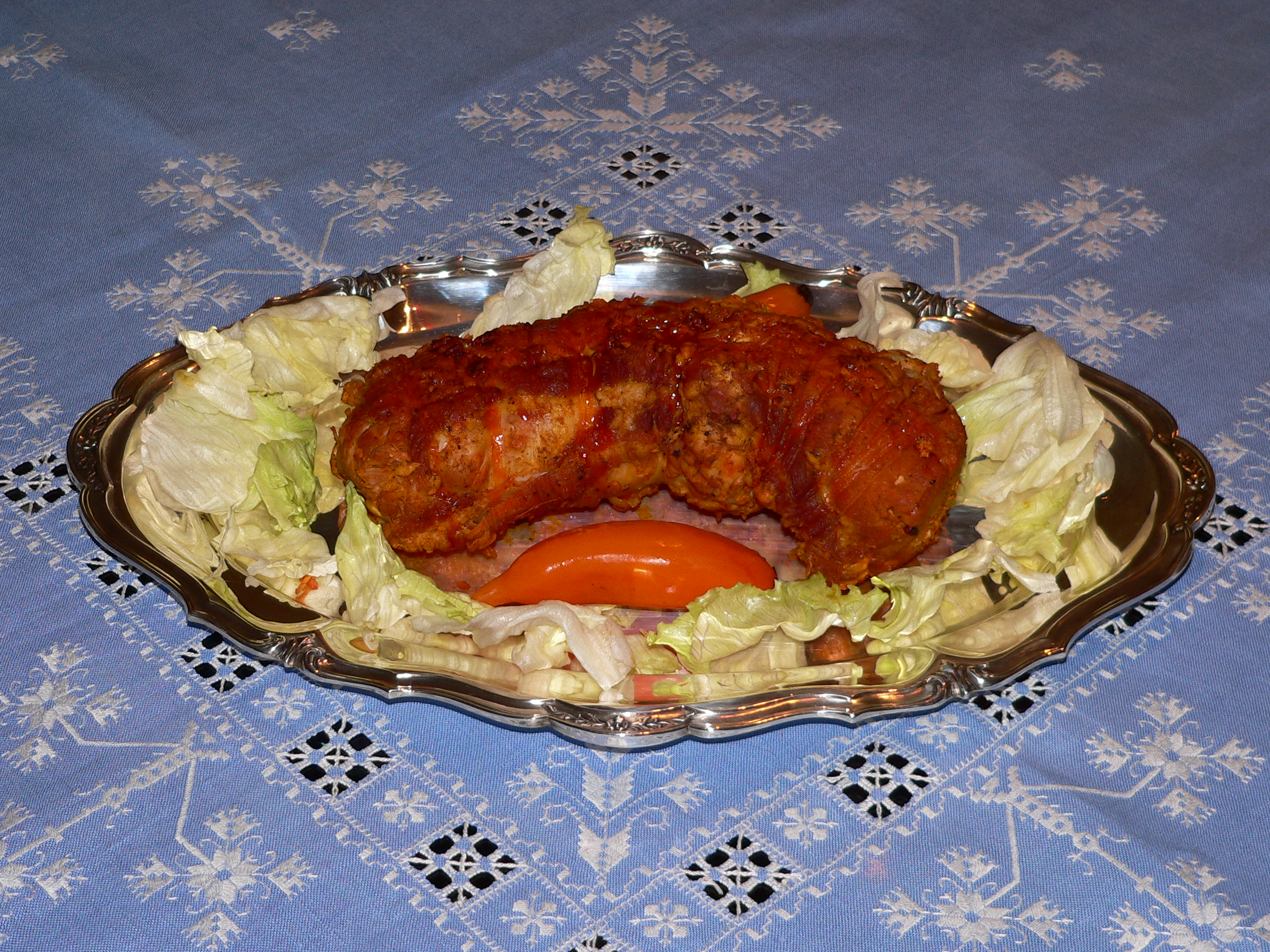
Jamón del país

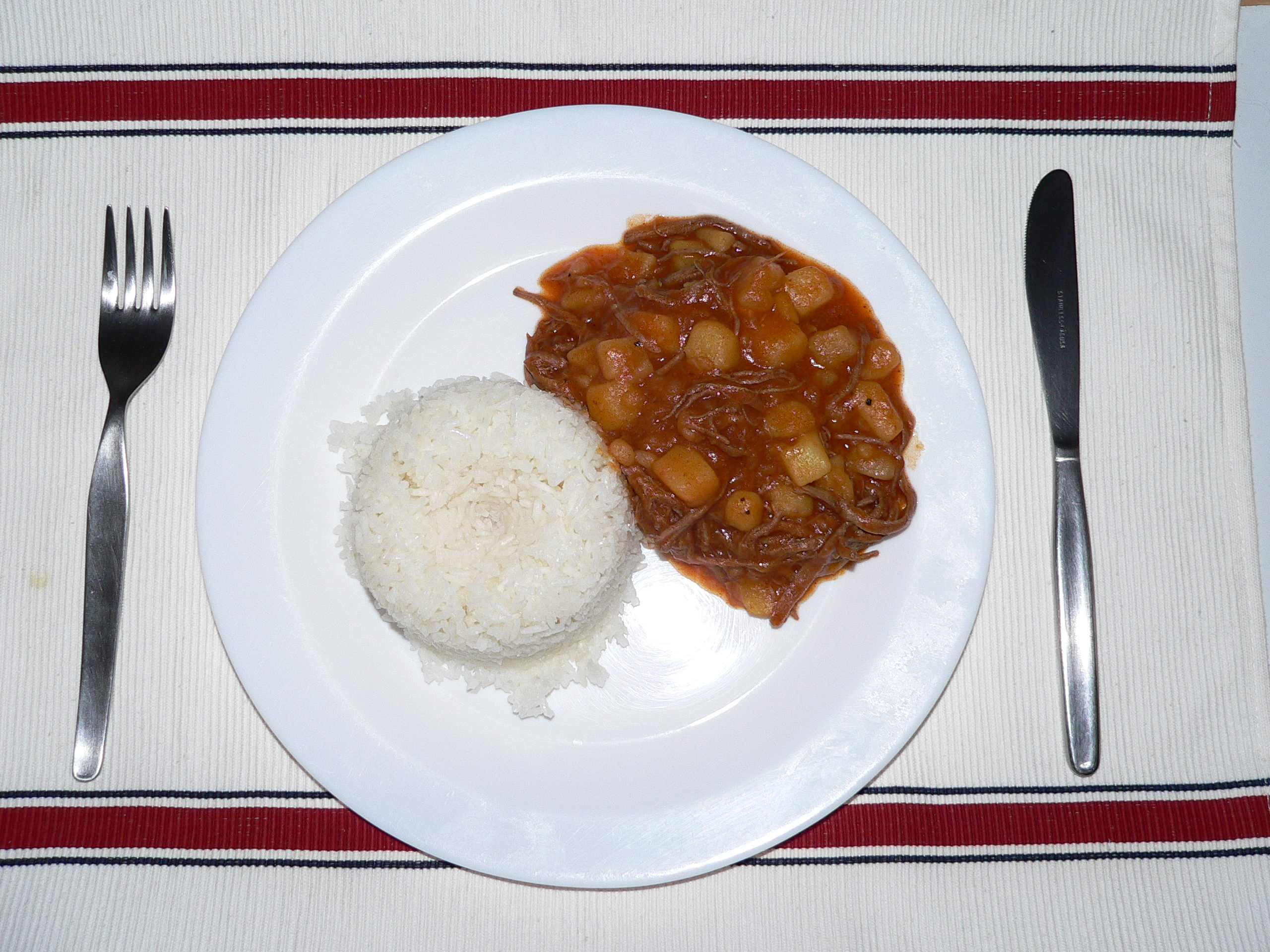
Carne mechada

- Adobo de chancho: Pork, pepper, ground garlic, onion, vinegar, and salt.
- Adobo: Pork marinated with concho de chicha (corn beer sediment) and spices, cooked in a pot with onions, served with bread.
- Aguadito
- Aguadito de mariscos: Rice stew with vegetables with shellfish and some shrimps.
- Ají de gallina: A chicken stew made with cream, cheese, aji (hot pepper), and peanuts.
- Aji de langostinos: Prawns in a bread crumb and aji amarillo (hot pepper) sauce, green pepper too.
- Anticuchos: Grilled brochettes of beef heart, macerated in vinegar and aji panca (hot pepper).
- Apanado de alpaca: Breaded alpaca meat, served with rice, potatoes, and salad.
- Aguadito de pollo: a traditional chicken soup in Peruvian cuisine consisting of chicken, cilantro, vegetables and spices.
- Arroz con pato a la Limeña: Like Arroz con pato a la Chiclayana but the salad contains mashed avocado, carrot, mayonnaise, and other ingredients.
- Arroz con pato a la Chiclayana: Tender duck meat cooked in black beer and cilantro.
- Asado de picuro: Roasted meat of tasty Amazonian rodent.
- Asado de venado: Roast deer meat with rice and green banana.
- Asado de zamaño, cutpe and sakino: Roasted pork, guinea pig, and peccary.
- Avispa juane: Chopped pork, mixed with garlic and spices, bound with egg and flour; this is boiled and wrapped in achira leaves like a tamale.
- Cabrito con frijoles: Stew of tender baby goat meat marinated in chicha de jora (fermented corn liquor whose origins date back to a time before the Incas) and vinegar accompanied with beans served with fried onions and garlic.
- Caldo de bolas: Stuffed banana balls
- Caldo de cabeza: Ram head soup prepared with mint and aji peppers.
- Caldo de carachama: Thick soup made of carachama fish, with garlic and cilantro (coriander).
- Caldo verde: Soup made with potatoes and aromatic herbs from the region.
- Cancacho: Roasted pork or lamb macerated in aji (hot pepper) and oil.
- Cancha: Corn tostado.
- Carapulcra Iqueña: Dehydrated potatoes, boiled and cooked with pork and chicken, aji panca and mirasol (chili peppers), garlic, and other spices.
- Carapulcra: Boiled dehydrated potatoes made into a stew with pork and chicken, aji panca and mirasol (hot peppers), garlic, and other spices.
- Cau-cau: Cow stomach stew with potatoes, turmeric, and parsley. Sometimes served with peas.
- Causa rellena: Mashed yellow potatoes seasoned with lime and aji (hot pepper), and filled with tuna or chicken.
- Cecina: Dried and salted beef or pork.
- Ceviche: Raw fish filet cut into pieces and marinated in key lime juice, onions, and aji limo.
- Ceviche de conchas: Scallops with lime, onion, and aji limo (hot pepper).
- Ceviche de jurel or mixto: Raw fish and/or shellfish marinated in key lime juice. It is served with onions, potato, sweet potato, corn, and lettuce.
- Chairo: Beef and lamb soup with potatoes, lima beans, squash, cabbage, chuño or dehydrated potatoes, wheat, and chalona or dried lamb.
- Chanfainita: Medallions of beef heart, served with white rice and potatoes.
- Charqui: Dry salty pork meat.
- Chicharron Colorado: Pork rinds fried in their own lard with an aji Colorado sauce (hot pepper).
- Chicharron con mote: Pork rinds fried in their own fat and accompanied with hominy or corn.
- Chicharron de chancho con maiz tostado: Fried pork rinds with toasted corn.
- Chicharrón de pescado de río: Fried pieces of river fish.
- Chicharrón de pulpo: Pieces of octopus, fried. It is served with onion salad, tomato, potatoes, and cooked sweet potatoes.
- Chinguirito: Cebiche using the dry meat of the banded guitar fish.
- Chirimpico: Stew made from the offal of the baby goat, covered with onions, garlic, hot peppers, cilantro (coriander) and squash, mixed with grains of tender corn.
- Choclo con queso: Boiled tender corn accompanies by fresh cheese.
- Chontajuane: Mashed chonta, palm, and paiche (fish), wrapped in banana leaves.
- Choros a la chalaca: Mussels covered with diced onions and aji (hot pepper) and seasoned with key lime juice.
- Chunchulijuane: Mashed yucca, cilantro (coriander), and chicken innards, wrapped in banana leaves.
- Chuño cola: Beef soup with rice, garbanzo beans, and dehydrated potatoes.
- Chupe de camarones: Chowder made with shrimp, milk, eggs, and oregano.
- Chupe de cangrejo: Crab chowder.
- Chupín de pejesapo: Soup with a base of onion, tomato, aji (hot pepper), and bumblebee catfish.
- Cordero al palo: A whole sheep on a spit grilled over glowing embers.
- Cuchicanca: Succulent pork meat marinated in vinegar and then roasted; it is served with boiled yellow potatoes and hominy (dried boiled corn).
- Cuy chactado: Guinea pig, breaded with corn flour and fried and served with golden potatoes and salad.
- Cuy con papas: Seasoned, cooked, and fried Guinea pig served with a potato stew, toasted peanuts, chopped onions and hot peppers.
- Cuy frito: Guinea pig breaded with corn meal and fried.
- Cuy relleno: Guinea pig stuffed with parsley, black mint, mint, oregano, green onions, cleaned and boiled innards, and crushed toasted peanuts.
- Enrollado: Roast beef, rolled and stuffed with ground pork and chicken meat, raisins, and hard boiled egg.
- Ensalada de chonta o salad palmito: (the palm stem is also called pona).
- Escabeche de Pollo: Pieces of fish or chicken marinated in vinegar and steamed with plenty of onions.
- Escribano: Potato salad, with rocoto, vinegar, oil, tomatoes, and parsley.
- Frejoles a la trujillana: Black beans with sesame seed and mirasol chili peppers.
- Huallpa chupe: Chicken soup with potato and rice.
- Huatia: Beef and potatoes cooked on hot stones with huacatay (black mint).
- Humitas: Mashed corn filled with seasoned beef or cheese, wrapped in corn shucks and steamed.
- Inchicapi: Chicken soup with peanuts, cilantro (coriander), and yucca cassava.
- Inchicucho: Prepared with corn, peanuts, and aji (hot pepper).
- Jalea: a lightly breaded and fried seafood dish.
- Juane Loretano: Rice seasoned with turmeric, and chicken wrapped in bijao leaves.
- Juane: Rice with paprika and pieces of chicken wrapped in bijao leaves.
- Juanes de arroz: Chicken mixed with rice seasoned with spices and, wrapped in bijao leaves.
- Juanes de yuca: Grated and boiled yucca mixed with rice and either chicken or beef jerky; this mixture is wrapped in a bijao leaf and steamed.
- Kapchi: Lima bean or mushroom soup with potatoes, milk, eggs, and cheese.
- Leche de Tigre: Concentrated key lime juice, fish, and blended aji limo (hot pepper). It is the by-product of the ceviche preparation.
- Llunca kashki con gallina: Chicken broth with wheat.
- Locro de gallina: A stew made of chicken, onions, potatoes, and aji peppers.
- Locro de Zapallo: Mashed squash with corn, cheese, yellow potatoes and huacatay.
- Lomo saltado: Beef tenderloin slices, sautéed with onions, tomatoes, aji (hot peppers), and other spices. It is served with French fries and rice. Lima
- Majado de yucca con chicharron: Cooked and crushed yucca with aji (hot pepper) and accompanied with chicharron (fried pork rinds).
- Majarisco: Mashed green bananas with a shellfish sauce.
- Mondongo ayacuchano: A soup with a base of hulled corn cooked all night long with beef, cow stomach, and bacon (cuchiqara). It is seasoned with aji Colorado, (hot pepper), blended and toasted and diced mint.
- Mondongo: Beef soup with cow innards, pork rinds, corn, and parsley.
- Morusa: Mashed butter beans with roast beef or pork.
- Natilla: A typical dessert made from goats milk, chancaca (sugar syrup), and very fine rice flour.
- Ocopa: Boiled potatoes covered with a fresh cheese sauce, lima beans, onions, olives, and rocoto.
- Olluco con charqui: Olluco stew with jerky or llama meat.
- Pachamanca: Variety of meats, potatoes, lima beans and humitas cooked in the pre-Hispanic style (on hot stones buried into the ground) and seasoned with aromatic herbs.
- Pachamanca Huanuqueña: Pork, potatoes, yucca cassava, and sweet potatoes cooked in a pre-Hispanic style (on hot stones buried into the ground) and seasoned with aromatic herbs like wild sage.
- Pallares: A stew of savory butter beans seasoned with aji (hot pepper).
- Pan con Chimbombo: Fish sandwich, mainly silverside fish.
- Panes Huancaveliqueños: Pumpkin buns, cheese pastries, wheat and achita breads.
- Papa a la Huancaína: Yellow potatoes with a spicy, creamy sauce.
- Papas con Uchullachua: Boiled potatoes with aji (hot pepper) and huacatay (aromatic herb).
- Parihuela: Concentrated soup of fish and shellfish.
- Pastel de choclo: Made with fresh corn, it can be either salty or sweet with raisins.
- Patachi: Wheat soup with beans, bacon, beef, and mint.
- Patarashca: Fire roasted fish wrapped in banana leaves.
- Patasca moqueguana o caldo de mondongo: Soup made with cow innards, corn, and mint.
- Patasca tacneña: A soup made with beef, pigs feet, wheat, yellow potato, squash, starch, and garlic.
- Pebre: Soup with lamb, beef, and ram jerky.
- Pecan caldo: Ram head soup, cooked with mint and the feet and stomach or innards of the ram; it is served with boiled potato and/or hominy.
- Pepian de Cuy: Stew made with Guinea pig meat, peanuts, and spices.
- Pepián de pava: Turkey stew with rice, tender blended corn, cilantro (coriander), and chili pepper.
- Pescado a la chorrillana: Fried fish in a tomato, onion, and white wine salsa.
- Pescado a la trujillana: Steamed fish with an egg and onion sauce.
- Pescado a lo macho: Fried fish in a shellfish sauce with aji (hot pepper) and garlic.
- Pesque de quinoa: Mashed quinoa seasoned with milk and cheese.
- Picadillo de paiche: Strips of dried and salted paiche fish meat served with onions, tomatoes, and aji (hot pepper).
- Picante a la tacneña: A stew made with cow stomach, cows feet, beef jerky, onions, and oregano.
- Picante de cuy Huanuqueño: Guinea pig stew cooked in a peanut and an aji panca (hot pepper) sauce.
- Picante de cuy: Barbecued guinea pig stew, seasoned with aji Colorado or amarillo (hot peppers). There is an old variation called jaka cashqui or guinea pig broth.
- Picante de mariscos: A stew made with mashed potatoes and aji Colorado (hot pepper), pieces of shellfish (limpets, surf clams) and sea weed (cochayuyo).
- Picante de Pallares: Spicy butter beans with milk, eggs and fresh cheese.
- Picante de papa con cuy frito: Cooked Guinea pig stew in a peanut and aji panca (hot pepper) sauce accompanied with potatoes.
- Puca picante: Potato stew with peanuts, blended and toasted, seasoned with aji panca (hot pepper) and fried pork rinds. It is served with rice and salad.
- Puchero: Made with cabbage, fruit, chickpeas, sweet potatoes and yucca. It is usually prepared at Carnival.
- Purtumute: Boiled beans with mote sancochado (individual grains of corn boiled with cilantro).
- Pusra: Toasted and blended barley soup with aromatic herbs, potatoes, peas, eggs, and milk.
- Qapchi: An appetizer made with cachipa or fresh cheese, crumbled and mixed with aji (a hot pepper), rocoto (a hot pepper), milk, oil and diced onions. It is served on a bed of potatoes.
- Rocoto Relleno: Rocoto (hot pepper) without veins stuffed with chopped beef, eggs, peas, carrots, cheese, milk, and potatoes.
- Ropa vieja: Beef stew with beans, potatoes, rice, and cabbage.
- Sancochado: Boiled beef with corn, sweet potato, carrots, cabbage, yucca, and potatoes.
- Sango de plátano verde: Made from black scallops and green bananas.
- Sarajuane: Mashed corn and peanut filled with pork, wrapped in bijao leaves.
- Saralawa: Soup of fresh corn, lima beans, dry aji Amarillo (yellow hot pepper), and huacatay (native herb).
- Seco de cabrito con frijoles: Stew made of tender baby goat meat marinated in chicha de jora (a fermented corn liquor whose origin dates back to the time before the Incas) and served with beans seasoned with fried onions and garlic.
- Seco de chabelo: Beef jerky or dried beef stew with sweetened bananas.
- Shambar: Soup made with wheat, pork rinds, smoked ham, assorted beans, and green onions. It is served with toasted corn (cancha) and is made only on Mondays.
- Soltero: A salad of fresh cheese, lima beans, onions, olives, tomatoes, and rocoto.
- Sopa teóloga: Turkey and/or chicken soup with moistened bread, potato, milk, and cheese.
- Sudado de machas: Stew made with onions, tomato, aji (hot pepper), surf clam, white wine and vinegar. It is served with boiled potatoes.
- Tacacho con cecina: Crushed bananas mixed with lard then baked or fried. It is served with dry meat.
- Tacacho: A dish of mashed and kneaded green, roasted bananas with fried pork rinds. Generally, it is combined with cecina.
- Tacu-tacu: Mixture of beans and rice, fried, and topped with breaded and pan-fried steak and an onion salsa.
- Tallarín Casero: Homemade noodles served with a stew (chicken, beef, or lamb) and kapchi of chuño (dehydrated potatoes).
- Tamales Ancashinos: Mashed corn filled with beef wrapped in banana leaves.
- Tamales: Mashed corn filled with beef, wrapped in banana leaves, and steamed..
- Timbuche: Concentrated broth made from fish and cilantro (coriander).
- Tortilla de raya: Egg tortilla made with dehydrated and re-hydrated ray meat.
- Uman caldo: Ram head soup, rice, potatoes and dehydrated potatoes. It is garnished with mint and aji (hot pepper).
- Yaku chupe or sopa verde: Soup made with potatoes, cheese, eggs, and aromatic herbs.

== Desserts ==
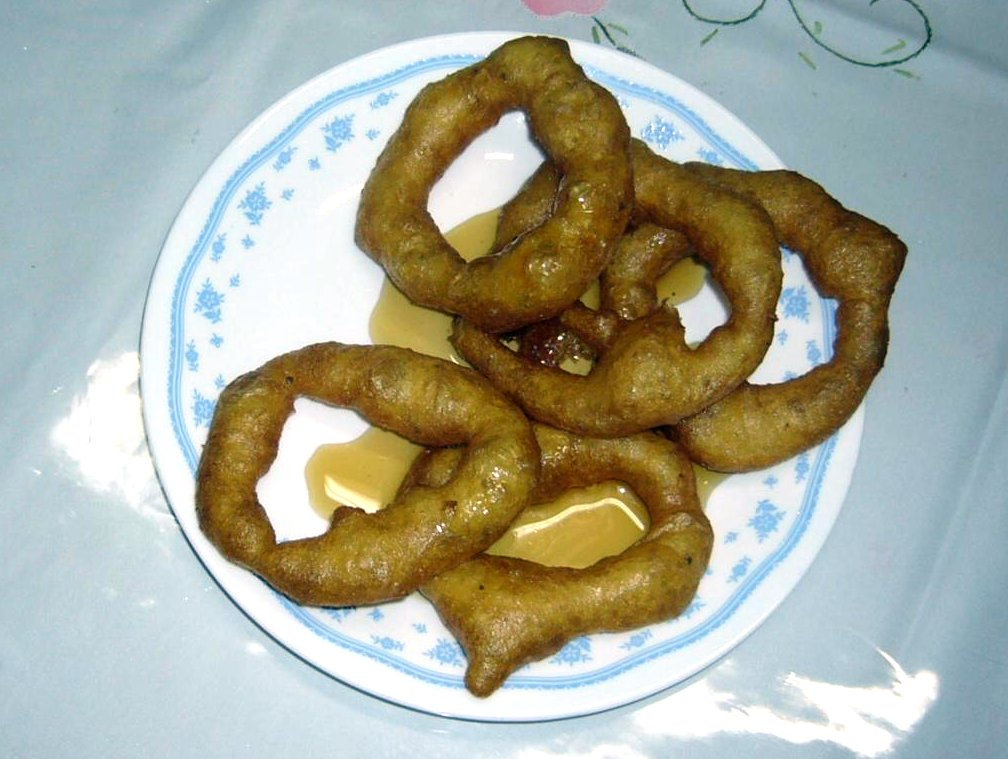
Picarones

- Alfajor de Penco
- Alfeñiques Lambayecanos
- Antecoco
- Antepapaya
- Arroz con leche
- Arroz Zambito
- Ayarampo (llipta)
- Champú Lambayecano.
- Champú Limeño
- Chapanas
- Chocotejas
- Churros con manjarblanco
- Cocadas
- Crema Volteada
- Dulce de Mamey
- Dulce de papaya
- Dulce o compota de Camote
- Frejol Colado
- Guargueros
- Humitas Dulces
- King Kong Lambayecano
- Leche Asada
- Machacado de Membrillo
- Masapanes
- Mazamorra de Cochino (also known as Mazamorra de maiz)
- Mazamorra morada
- Mousse de Fresa
- Natillas Norteñas
- Oquendos
- Picarones
- Ponderaciones
- Prestiños
- Ranfañote
- Sanguito
- Suspiro a la limeña
- Tejas
- Turrón de Doña Pepa
- Voladores

== Beverages ==
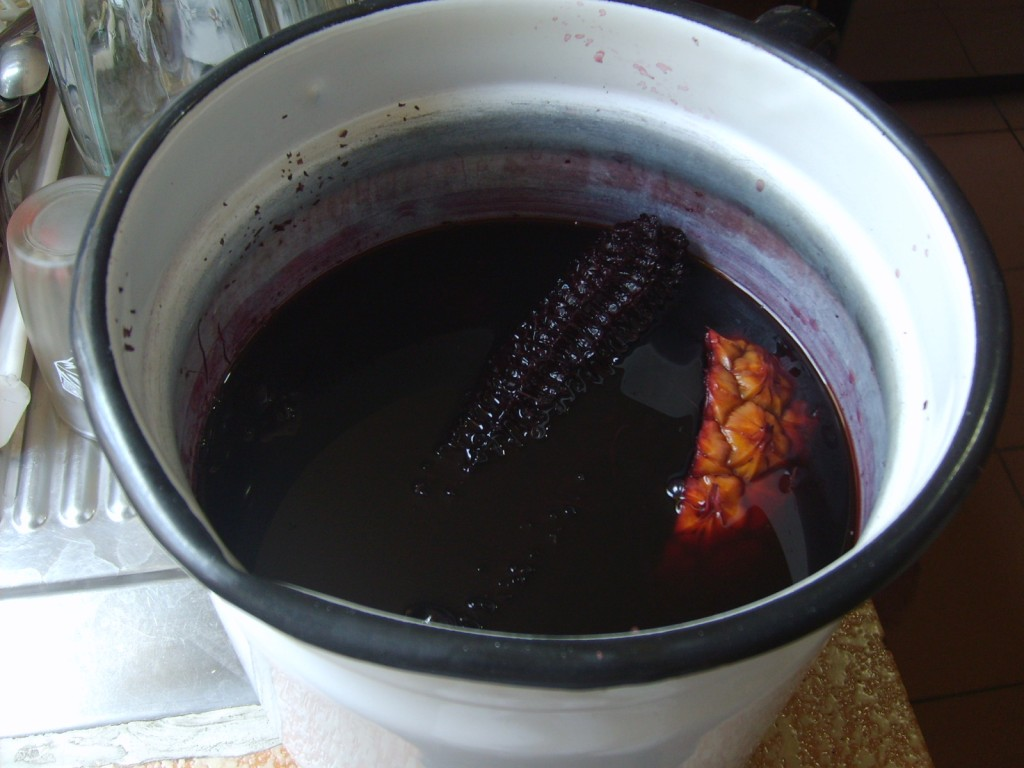
Chicha morada, with the purple corn and additional pineapple still in the water for flavor purposes.

- Aguajina: Made from mashed, filtered, and sweetened fruit of the aguaje palm tree.
- Cachina: a partially-fermented wine based on fermented grape must.
- Caliche: A type of distilled liquor.
- Chapo: Made from ripened bananas, cooked and stirred, then served cold.
- Chicha de jora: Fermented corn drink, which origin and consumption predate the Incas.
- Chicha de maní: Fermented peanuts liquor.
- Chicha de molle: Fermented liquor of False Pepper fruit (also called Peruvian peppertree or molle)
- Chicha morada: Alcohol-free drink of purple corn juice.
- Chimbango de tres higos: Liqueur prepared with red, black, and green figs.
- Chuchuhuasi: Cordial made from a bitter and astringent root, very popular in western Peru.
- Coconachado: Made from the cocona fruit, sugar, and cordial.
- Guarapo de caña: Fermented and sweetened sugar cane juice.
- Huarapo: Fermented sugar cane juice.
- Huitochado: Made with the "huito" fruit, sugar, and cordial.
- Leche de monja: Liqueur prepared with a cordial, eggs, and key lime.
- Licor de leche: Made from cordial and whey filtered drop by drop until transparent.
- Licor de mora: Made from cordial, blackberries, and syrup.
- Macerado de damasco: Peach liqueur made with pisco.
- Masato: Drink made of cooked, smashed, and fermented yucca cassava, with sweet potato or sugar.
- Piraña bite: Made with rum and cocona.
- Ponche Ayacuchano: Drink of peanut, sesame, and other spices.
- Ponche de maca: Drink made of maca, a local root with energizing properties.
- Ponche: This punch is made with sesame seeds, Brazil nuts, peanuts, pecans, grated coconut, vanilla, milk, cinnamon, clover, and sugar. On special occasions almonds and/or walnuts may be added. It is served with grated coconut and a glass of pure distilled sugar cane juice.
- Pur Pur: Made from cordial, fruit and pur pur seeds. Later, syrup is added.
- Refresco de aguajina: Delicious juice made with aguaje, edible fruit of a native palm tree.
- Refresco de cocona: Juice of a common fruit from the area.
- Refresco de pihuayo: Juice made with the fruit of another native palm tree.
- Shibe: Juice prepared with fermented and toasted yucca.
- Siete Raíces: Made with bark from different trees like the Brazilwood, clove vine, breadfruit, huacapurana, chuchuhuasi, rosewood, and ipururo, sweetened with honey and macerated in cordial.

=== Pisco cocktails ===
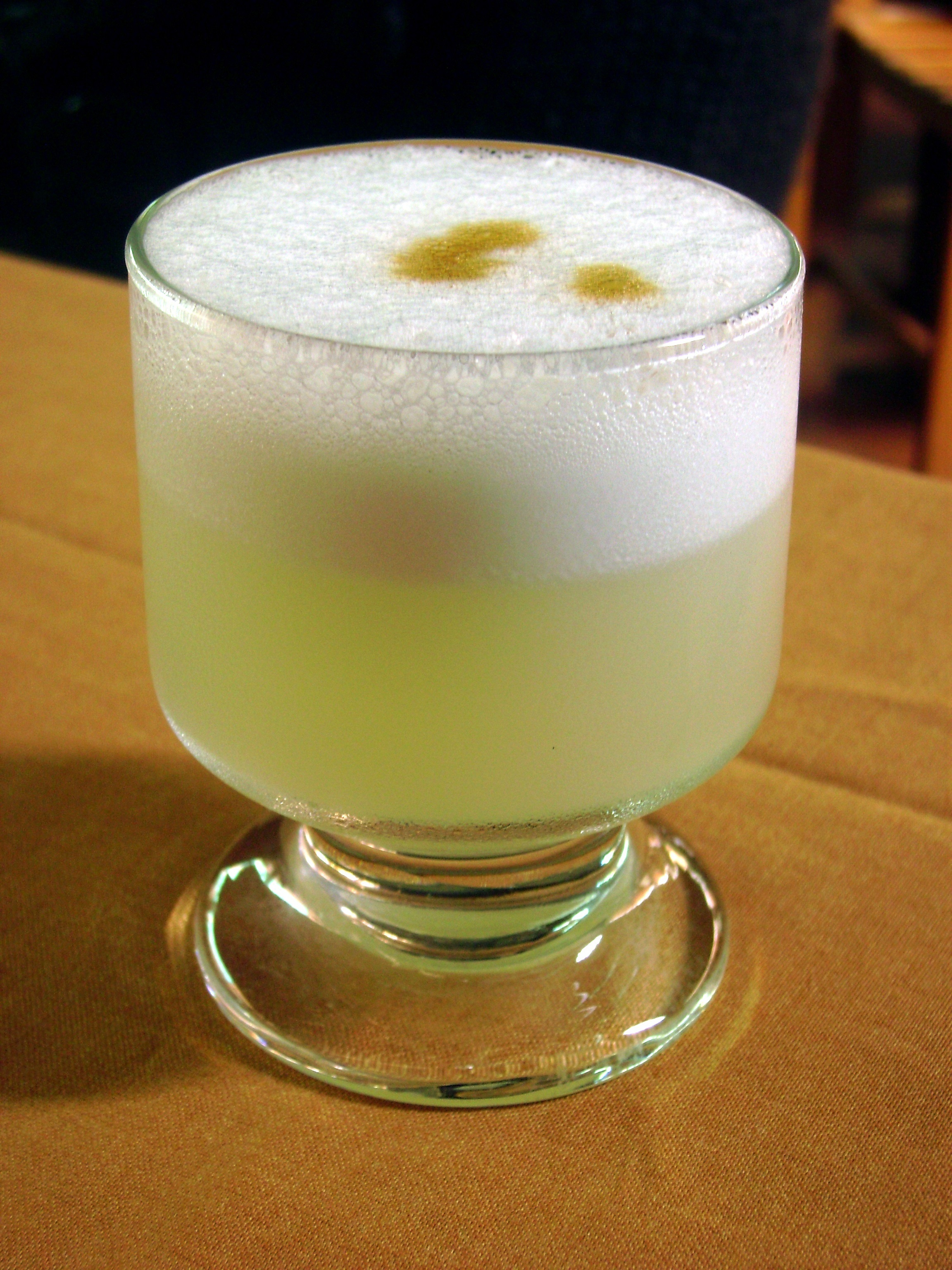
A Pisco Sour

- Algarrobina
- Aguaymanto Sour
- Aguaymanto Sour
- Apple Pisco
- Bull Pisco
- Café Oxidado
- Cafe Quirichisqa
- Cahuide Punch
- Cala Martini
- Canario
- Capitán
- Carambita
- Caricia
- Chilcanito de Manzana
- Chilcano de Anís
- Chilcano de guinda
- Chilcano de Pisco
- Cholo Blanco
- Cholo Negro
- Cholopolitan
- Clavito
- Coca Sour
- Cocona Sour
- Costeñito Sour
- El Carajo
- El Cholo Bravo
- El Lucumero
- Huaca del Sol y La Luna
- Huacachina
- Huamancoco
- Huamanripa
- La Chola Picarona
- La Sirenita
- La Zalamera
- Limeña Mazamorrera
- Lulo Sour
- Luz de Luna
- Maki Maki
- Malambo
- Mamacha
- Manzapistini
- Maraki Almendrado
- Maraki Cafe
- Maraki Colada
- Maraki Cooler
- Maraki Ice Tea
- Maraki Latte
- Maraki on the Beach
- Maricucha
- Maricucha
- Mata Chola
- Michifuz
- Mojadita
- Morena Mia
- Morochita
- Mosquito
- Mother Earth
- Pisco Collins
- Pisco Punch
- Pisco Sour: Typical Peruvian cocktail made with a pisco, lime and egg-white.
- Poker
- Potito Sour
- Red Martini
- Sol y Sombra
- Sour Apasionado
- Su Santidad
- Tuna Sour
- Wakamayu
- Yanganuco
- Zamboni
