= Peruvians =

People of Peru

Peruvians Peruanos

Total population
- c. 36.5 million Diaspora 3.5 million

Regions with significant populations
- (Peru) 33,105,273 (2019 estimate)
- United States: 951,296
- Spain: 430,277
- Argentina: 319,183
- Chile: 260,785 (2023)
- Italy: 94,131
- Brazil: 65,494 (2025)
- Japan: 49,068
- Venezuela: 44,319
- Canada: 42,295
- France: 30,000
- Switzerland: 17,112
- Australia: 11,571
- Sweden: 9,780
- Germany: 9,000
- United Kingdom: 7,426
- Mexico: 4,948
- Netherlands: 4.749
- Colombia: 4,042
- French Guiana (Overseas France): 2,500
- Dominican Republic: 1,489
- Puerto Rico: 1,218
- Aruba: 1,100

Languages
- Peruvian Spanish • Quechua • Aymara

Religion
- Predominantly: 76.03% Catholicism; Minorities: 5.09% Irreligion, 14.07% Evangelical, 1.64% Non-denominational Christian, 1.52% Adventist, 0.75% Jehovah's Witness, 0.49% Mormon and 0.41% Other

Peruvians (Spanish: peruanos/peruanas) are the citizens of Peru. What is now Peru has been inhabited for several millennia by cultures such as the Caral before the Spanish conquest in the 16th century. Peruvian population decreased from an estimated 5–9 million in the 1520s to around 600,000 in 1620 mainly because of infectious diseases carried by the Spanish. Spaniards and Africans arrived in large numbers in 1532 under colonial rule, mixing widely with each other and with Native Peruvians. During the Republic, there has been a gradual immigration of European people (especially from Spain and Italy, and to a lesser extent from Germany, France, Croatia, and the British Isles). Chinese and Japanese arrived in large numbers at the end of the 19th century.

With 31.2 million inhabitants according to the 2017 Census. Peru is the fourth most populous country in South America. Its demographic growth rate declined from 2.6% to 1.6% between 1950 and 2000, and its population is expected to reach approximately 46 - 51 million in 2050. As of 2017, 79.3% lived in urban areas and 20.7% in rural areas. Major cities include Lima, home to over 9.5 million people, Arequipa, Trujillo, Chiclayo, Piura, Iquitos, Huancayo, Cusco and Pucallpa, all of which reported more than 250,000 inhabitants. The largest expatriate Peruvian communities are in the United States, South America (Argentina, Chile, Venezuela and Brazil), Europe (Spain, Italy, France and the United Kingdom), Japan, Australia, and Canada.

== Ethnic groups ==
In the 2017 Census, those of age 12 and above were asked what ancestral origin they belong to, with 60.2% of Peruvians self-identifying as mestizos, 20% as Quechuas, 5% as European, 3% as Afro-Peruvian, 2% as Aymaras, 0.6% as Amazonians, and 0.1% as Asian. Large indigenous populations live in the southern Andes, with other large populations found on the southern and central coast due to massive internal labor migration from the Andes to coastal cities over the past four decades.

=== Mestizo ===
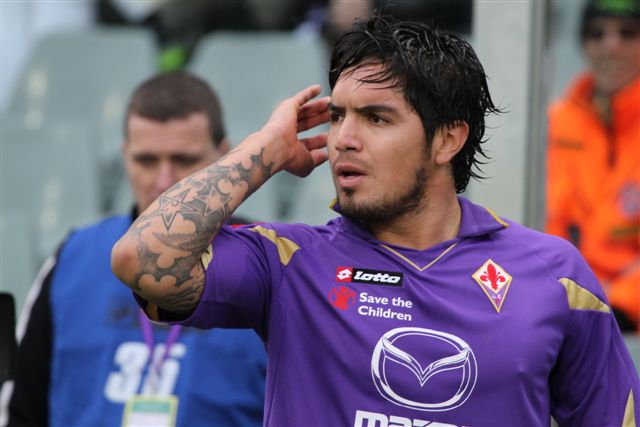
Juan Manuel Vargas

Mestizos compose 60.2% of the total population. The term traditionally denotes Peruvians of mixed Indigenous and European ancestry (mostly Spanish ancestry). This term was part of the caste classification used during colonial times, whereby people of exclusive Spanish descent who were born in the colonies were called criollos, people of mixed Indigenous and Spanish descent were called mestizos, those of African and Spanish descent were called mulatos, and those of Indigenous and African descent were called zambos. Genetic analysis conducted among Peruvians from Lima found that they are of predominantly Indigenous ancestry. Most mestizos are urban dwellers and show stronger European inheritance in regions like Lima Region, La Libertad Region, Callao Region, Cajamarca Region, San Martin Region, Piura Region, Lambayeque Region, and Arequipa Region.

=== Indigenous ===
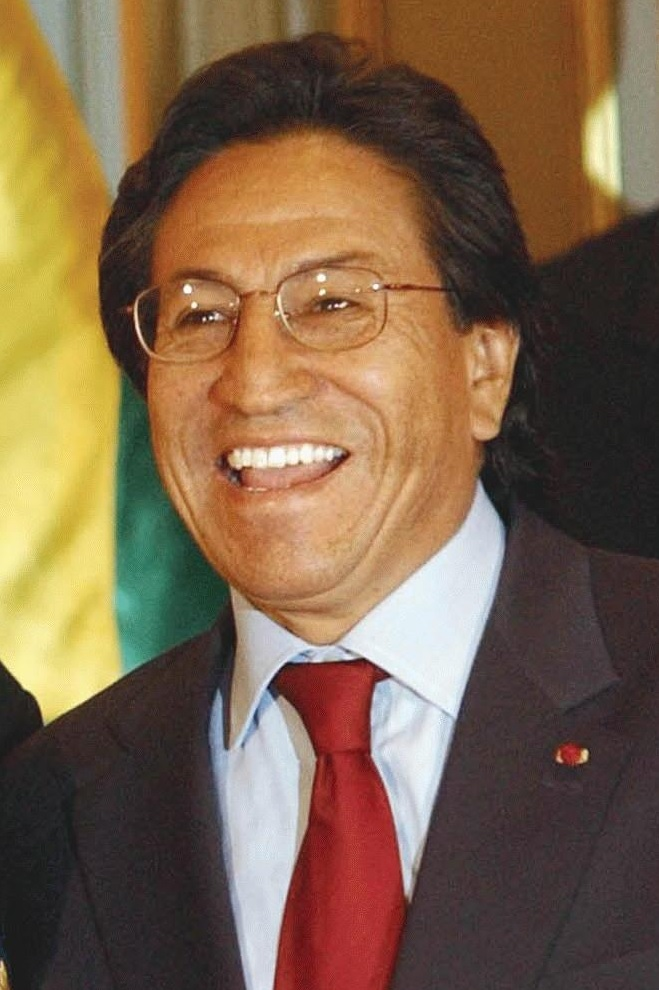
Alejandro Toledo

Ethnic groups of Indigenous origin constitute 25.8% of the total population. The two major ethnic groups are the Quechuas (belonging to various cultural subgroups), followed by the Aymara, mostly found in the extreme southern Andes. A large proportion of the ethnic groups who live in the Andean highlands still speak Quechua and have vibrant cultural traditions, some of which were part of the Inca Empire.

Dozens of Peruvian cultures are also dispersed throughout the country beyond the Andes Mountains in the Amazon basin. This region is rapidly becoming urbanized. Important urban centers include Iquitos, Nauta, Puerto Maldonado, Pucallpa and Yurimaguas. This region is home to numerous ethnic groups, though they do not constitute a large proportion of the total population. Examples of ethnic groups residing in eastern Peru include the Shipibo, Urarina, Cocama, and Aguaruna. There is no special law for ethnic groups or reserves; they are Peruvians and are legally treated as such. In the present day, some isolated indigenous communities still live in the Peruvian Amazon. Though living far from other settlements, these communities enjoy the same rights and constitutional protections as Peruvians of other backgrounds.

=== European ===
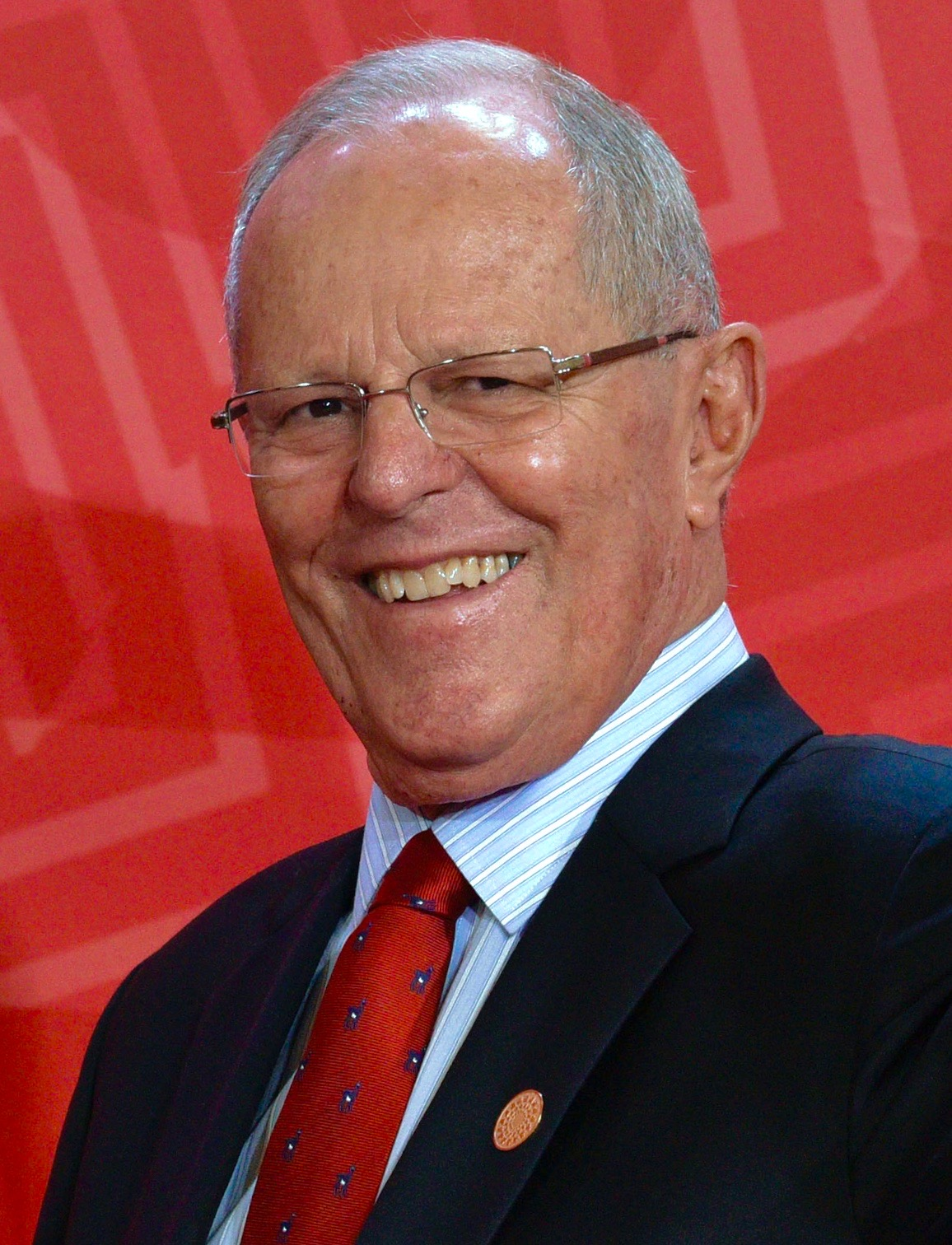
66th President Pedro Pablo Kuczynski

European descendants total 5.9% of the total population. Most of them are descendants of Spanish settlers that came to the country during the colonial era, while others are descendants of other European ethnic groups that arrived in the 19th and 20th centuries like Italians, Germans, British, French, Irish, Dutch, Portuguese, Polish, and Croats. Most of them also live in the largest cities, generally in the capital Lima and the northern cities of Peru: Trujillo, Tacna, Chiclayo and Piura.

The city of Arequipa in the south of Peru displays the majority of Spanish descendants in the south. Cajamarca in the highlands, parts of San Martin in the Rupa-Rupa or Amazonian Andes Area; Oxapampa and Pozuzo were populated by German and Austrian settlers also in the Rupa-Rupa or Amazonian Andes area. A considerable European population migrated to Peru seeking economic opportunity in the booming oil, mining, fishing, sugar, cotton, guano, and rubber industries in the 19th century. Recently, Peru has seen an influx of American senior citizens and businessmen looking for permanent residency to settle in the country, due to the lower cost of living, gastronomy, Amazon forest environment, and the ease of doing business in Peru due to liberalized economic policy in the 21st century.

=== African ===
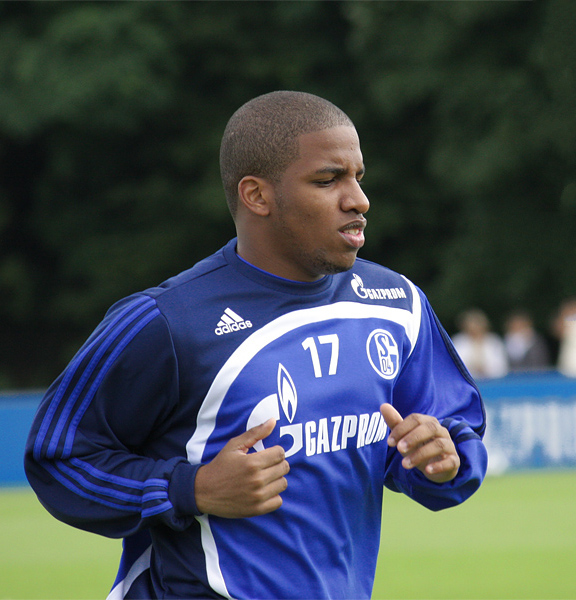
Jefferson Farfán

Afro-Peruvians constitute 3.6% of the population. Peru, as a Spanish colony, has a history of involvement in the slave trade, with slave imports originating from Ghana, Angola, Nigeria, the Republic of Congo, the Democratic Republic of Congo, Mozambique, and Madagascar. As in other Spanish colonies, slaves were typically imported to perform labor work in sugar cane, cotton fields and vineyards, very few of them in gold mines in Cuzco. The Spaniards brought 500 Africans from Guinea as part of the troops for the Conquista by 1531. Slavery in Peru was abolished in 1854 by President Ramón Castilla. Today also mulatos (mixed African and European) and zambos (mixed African and Indigenous) constitute an important part of the population as well, especially in Piura, Tumbes, Lambayeque, Lima and Ica regions. The Afro-Peruvian population is concentrated mostly in coastal cities south of Lima, such as those found in the Ica Region, in cities like Cañete, Chincha, Ica, Nazca and Acarí in the border with the Arequipa Region. The African descendants brought their own dances and drumming music style, creating some instruments like the "Cajon" and some culinary art characterized by their delicious taste. Some of the best soccer players in Peru are Afro-descendants. Relatively unmixed African populations exist in El Carmen en Chincha Alta Ica, Peru.

Another large Afro-Peruvian presence is in the Yunga regions (west and just below the Andean chain of northern Peru), (i.e., Piura and Lambayeque), where sugarcane, lemon, and mango production are still of importance. Important communities are found in the Morropón Province, such as in the city of Chulucanas. One of them is Yapatera, a community in the same city, as well as smaller farming communities like Pabur or La Matanza and even in the mountainous region near Canchaque. Further south, the colonial city of Zaña or farming towns like Capote and Tuman in Lambayeque are also important regions with Afro-Peruvian presence.

=== Asian ===
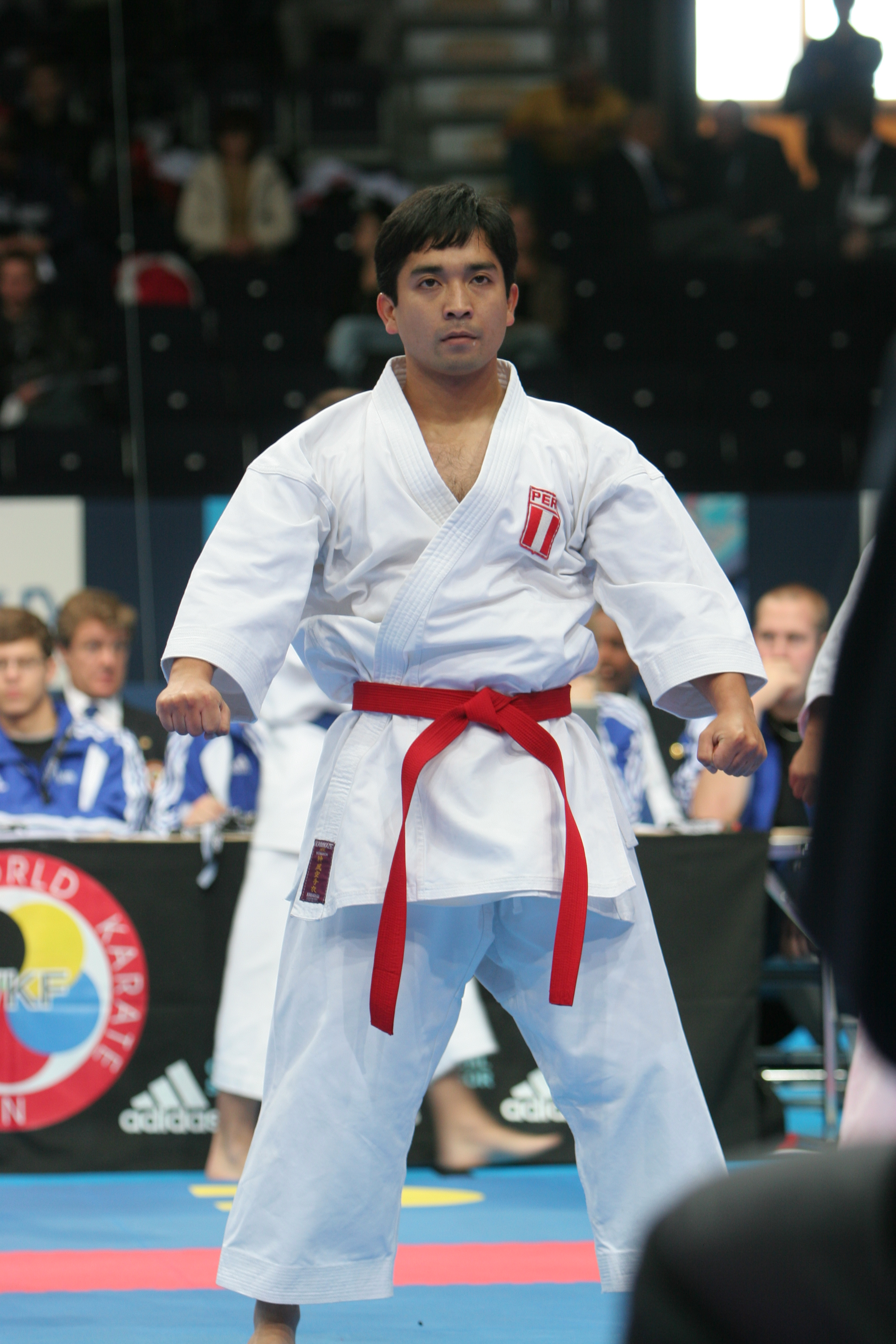
Akio Tamashiro

According to the 2017 census, 3-10% of the population identifies as having either Chinese or Japanese heritage. Peru has the largest population of Chinese descendants in Latin America since Peru became independent from Spain in 1821 and banned the import of slaves. The first group of Asians came in 1849 on the Danish ship named Federico Guillermo to replace slavery as part of the plan to abolish slavery in 1854 by replacing it with the Asian labor force. During the next 25 years, 100,000 Chinese arrived in Peru, hired in eight-year contracts from Macao, Hong Kong, Canton, and Fujian, including some Sangley people. They were hired for sugar cane fields, rice fields, extracting guano and constructing the railroads in the Andes in semi-slavery working conditions.

Geographically Chinese descendant communities are found throughout the Peruvian upper Amazon, including cities such as Yurimaguas, Nauta, Iquitos and the north-central coast (Lambayeque and Trujillo) and the capital Lima.

In contrast to the Japanese community in Peru, the Chinese appear to have intermarried much more since they came to work in the rice fields during the Viceroyalty and to replace the African slaves, as laborers during the abolition of slavery itself. Despite the presence of Peruvians of Asian heritage being quite recent, in the past decade, they have made significant advancements in business and political fields; a past president (Alberto Fujimori), several past cabinet members, and one member of the Peruvian Congress are of Chinese or Japanese origin. There are also large numbers of Arab Peruvians, mostly Palestinians, Lebanese, Syrians, and Iraqis.

Self-identified Racial and Ethnic Composition (2017) Instituto Nacional de Estadística e Informática (INEI)
Race/Ethnicity
Mestizo	60.1%
Quechua	22.3%
White	5.9%
Afro-Peruvian	3.6%
Aymara	2.4%
Amazonian	0.3%
Others	1.1%

=== Immigration after independence ===
After independence, there has been a gradual European immigration from Spain, Italy, Croatia, France, Germany, and Austria. Chinese arrived in the 1850s as a replacement for slave workers in the sugar plantations of the north coast and have since become a major influence in Peruvian society.

== Languages ==
Peruvian Spanish is the main language of 82.6% majorly spoken in the Coastal cities, It is the primary language of the country used for the public media, television, radio, newspapers, and the internet in general with very minimal exceptions. It coexists with several Indigenous languages, the most common Quechua, 13.9% and Aymara 1.6%, both spoken mostly in the Andes, Ashaninka 0.3% in the Rainforest. Other Native and foreign languages were spoken at that time by 0.8% and 0.2% of Peruvians, respectively. Literacy was estimated at 94.2% in 2017; this rate is lower in rural areas (83%) than in urban areas (96.8%).

== Religions ==
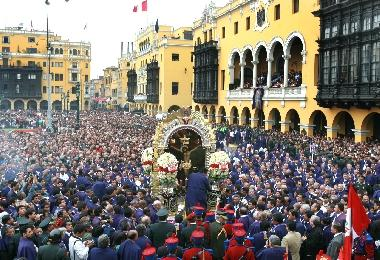
Peruvians participating in the annual procession in commemoration of the Lord of Miracles

According to the 2017 Census, Christianity is the largest religion in Peru, with Roman Catholics having the most adherents (76%), other Christians 18.6%, Other 0.5%, and non-religious 5%. Lord of Miracles is a mural painted by an Angolan slave in the 17th century of Jesus Christ that is venerated in Lima and the main Catholic festivity in Peru and one of the biggest processions around the world. Every year, in October, hundreds of thousands of pilgrims from all walks of life, dress in purple to celebrate the also known "Black Christ" in a religious procession through the streets of Lima. The story tells that some earthquakes in Lima during the 17th and 18th Centuries destroyed most of the city leaving only that mural that was painted by the Angolan slave in 1651 as the only standing wall after the quakes in 1655,1687 and 1746 8.6 magnitude earthquake. These facts contributed to the growth and the solidification of devoted veneration to the mural known as "Christ of Pachacamilla"

== Culture ==
Machu Picchu

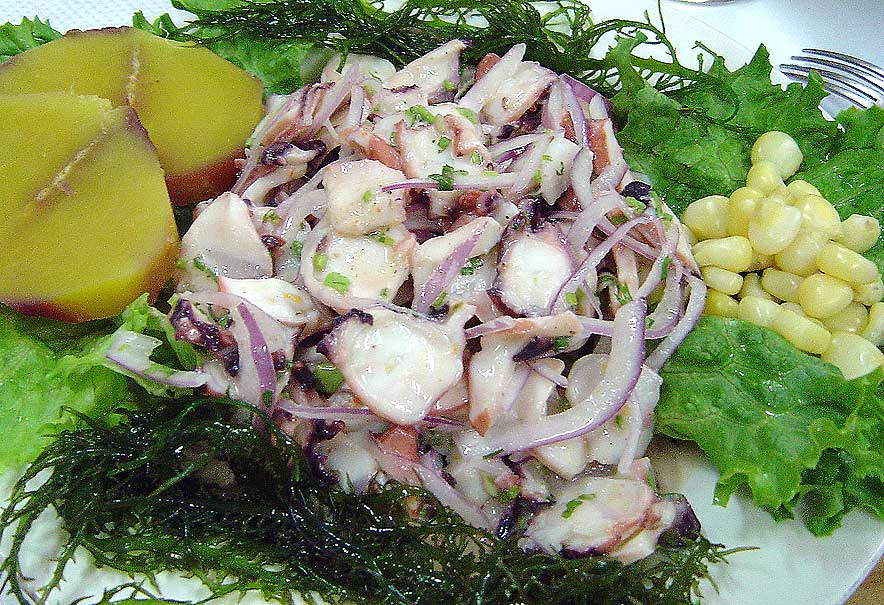
Ceviche is a lime marinated seafood dish.

Peruvian culture is primarily rooted in Amerindian traditions, mainly Inca, and Hispanic heritage. It has also been influenced by various European, African, and Asian ethnic groups. Peruvian artistic traditions date back to the elaborate pottery, textiles, jewelry, and sculpture of Pre-Inca cultures. The Incas maintained these crafts and made architectural achievements including the construction of Machu Picchu. Baroque dominated colonial art, though modified by Native traditions. During this period, most arts focused on religious subjects; the numerous churches of the era and the paintings of the Cuzco School are representative. Arts stagnated after independence until the emergence of Indigenismo in the early 20th century. Since the 1950s, Peruvian art has been eclectic and shaped by both foreign and local art currents. The Peruvian culture today is modern with global influences, always open to new trends and is constantly moving and changing in Music, Art, Literature. Peruvians are expressive, using hand gestures when talking and are tactile, expecting a kiss on the cheek for hi and bye. It is not uncommon to see couples showing affection in public places. Peruvians also have respect for elders, people of higher positions at work, skilled professionals and educated people.

=== Literature ===
Peruvian literature has its roots in the oral traditions of pre-Columbian civilizations. Spaniards introduced writing in the 16th century; colonial literary expression included chronicles and religious literature. After independence, Costumbrism and Romanticism became the most common literary genres, as exemplified in the works of Ricardo Palma. In the early 20th century, the Indigenismo movement produced such writers as Ciro Alegría, José María Arguedas, and César Vallejo. During the second half of the century, Peruvian literature became more widely known because of authors such as Nobel laureate Mario Vargas Llosa, a leading member of the Latin American Boom. María Jesús Alvarado Rivera was a Peruvian rebel feminist, educator, journalist, writer and social activist who was noted by the National Council of Women of Peru in 1969 as the "first modern champion of women's rights in Peru".

=== Architecture ===
Machu Picchu, one of the seven wonders of the world, was built by the Incans in the 15th century, sometimes referred to the "Lost City of the Incans". It is theorized that it was used as a retreat by the Incan elite. Machu Picchu was surrounded by terraces for agricultural use. After the Spanish conquest, the site was lost until the 20th century.

Other famous architectural sites in Peru include the fort of Sacsayhuaman, famous for its high stone walls, and the city of Chan-Chan, the capital of a civilization called the Chimu culture, located on what is now the site of Trujillo. It was the largest city in Pre-Columbian South America. It is believed to have been built in the mid-800s, and held 40-60 thousand people. It is the largest adobe city in the Americas, and believed to be the second-largest in the world.

Other famous examples of Peruvian colonial architecture include the Cathedral of Lima, the Basilica of San Francisco in Lima, the Cusco Cathedral, and the Church of San Agustin.

=== Cuisine ===
Peruvian cuisine shows influences from Andean, Spanish, Chinese, Italian, Arab, African, and Japanese cooking. Common dishes include anticuchos, ceviche and pachamanca. Because of the variety of climates within Peru, a wide range of plants and animals are available for cooking. Peruvian cuisine has a special ingredient that gives the flavor to the majority of dishes "aji seco". If the same dish is prepared in another part of the world it might look the same, but the raw vegetables, potatoes, ingredients have a different taste in other parts of the world. Examples of these are eggs, quinoa, Lima beans, fish, lime which is more acidic, they taste totally different in other countries. Peru has more than 4,000 types of potatoes, as well as quinoa, both from the highlands. introduced to Europe by the Spaniards in 1532 after the conquest. Ancient Peruvians were harvesting potatoes between 8000 and 5000 years according to scientific research.

==== Traditional dishes ====
- Adobo de chancho: Pork, turmeric, ground garlic, vinegar, and salt.
- Aguadito de mariscos: Rice stew with vegetables with shellfish and some shrimps.
- Ají de gallina: A chicken stew made with cream, cheese, aji (hot pepper), and peanuts.
- Anticuchos: Grilled brochettes of beef heart, macerated in vinegar and aji panca (hot pepper).
- Aji de langostinos: Prawns in a bread crumb and aji amarillo (hot pepper) sauce, green pepper too.
- Arroz con pato a la Chiclayana: Tender duck meat cooked in black beer and cilantro.
- Aguadito de pollo: a traditional chicken soup in Peruvian cuisine consisting of chicken, cilantro, vegetables and spices.
- Carapulcra: Boiled dehydrated potatoes made into a stew with pork and chicken, aji panca and mirasol (hot peppers), garlic, and other spices.
- Cau-cau: Cow stomach stew with potatoes, turmeric, and parsley. Sometimes served with peas.
- Causa rellena: Mashed yellow potatoes seasoned with lime and aji (hot pepper), and filled with tuna or chicken.
- Ceviche: Raw fish filet cut into pieces and marinated in key lime juice, onions, and aji limo.
- Pachamanca: Variety of meats, potatoes, lima beans and humitas cooked in the pre-Hispanic style (on hot stones buried into the ground) and seasoned with aromatic herbs.
- Papa a la Huancaína: Yellow potatoes with a spicy, creamy sauce
- Rocoto Relleno: Rocoto (hot pepper) without veins stuffed with chopped beef, eggs, peas, carrots, cheese, milk, and potatoes.

=== Music ===
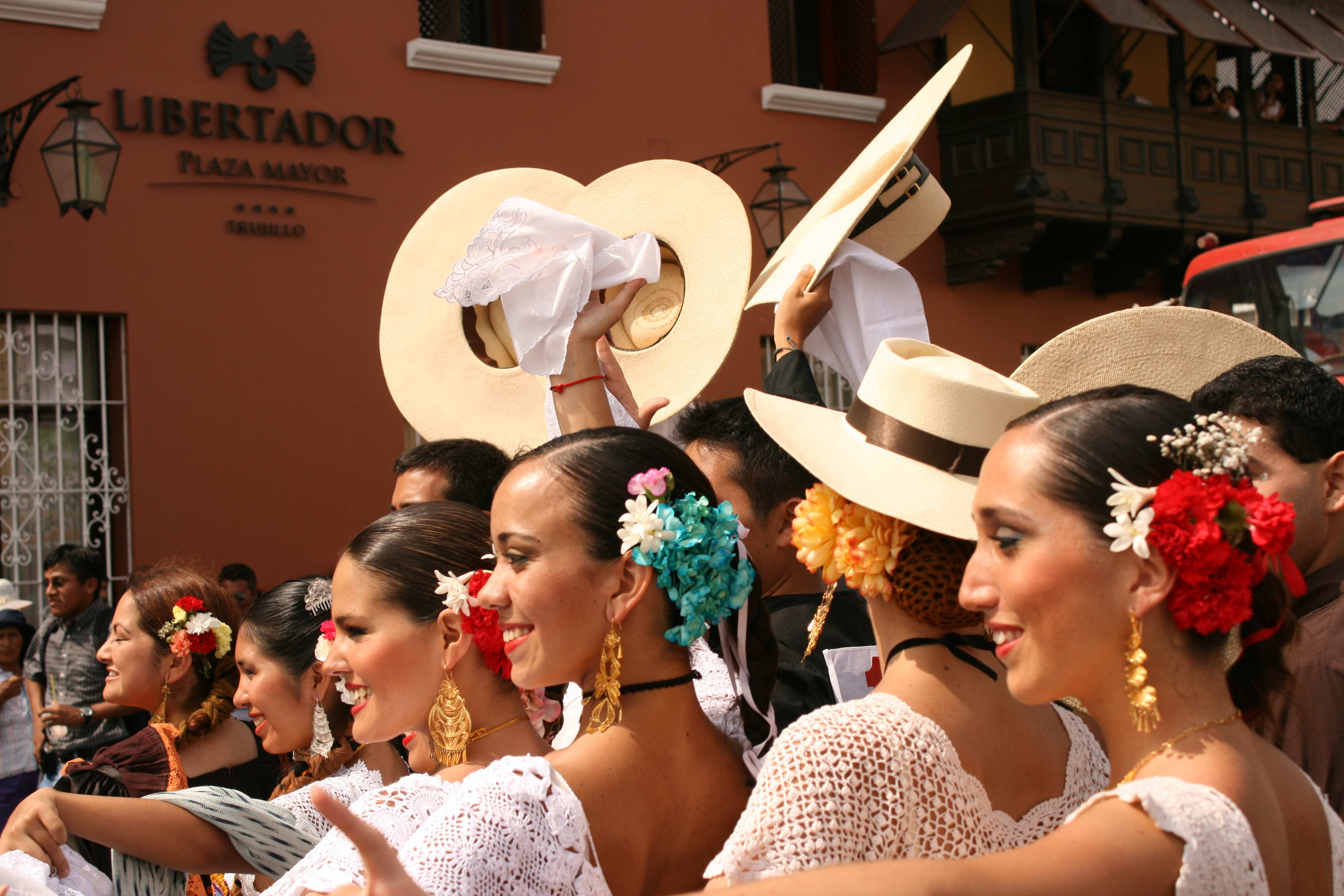
Marinera dancers in Trujillo.

Peruvian music has Andean, Spanish, and African roots. In pre-Hispanic times, musical expressions varied widely from region to region; the quena and the tinya were two common instruments. Spanish conquest brought the introduction of new instruments such as the guitar and the harp, as well as the development of crossbred instruments like the charango. African contributions to Peruvian music include its rhythms and the cajón, a percussion instrument. Peruvian folk dances include marinera, tondero and huayno.

== See also ==
- Demographics of Peru
- Peruvian Americans
- Peruvian migration to the United Kingdom
- Peruvians in France
- Peruvian Mexicans
- Peruvians in Spain
- Inca Empire
- Bolivians
- Amerindians
- Hispanics

== Gallery ==
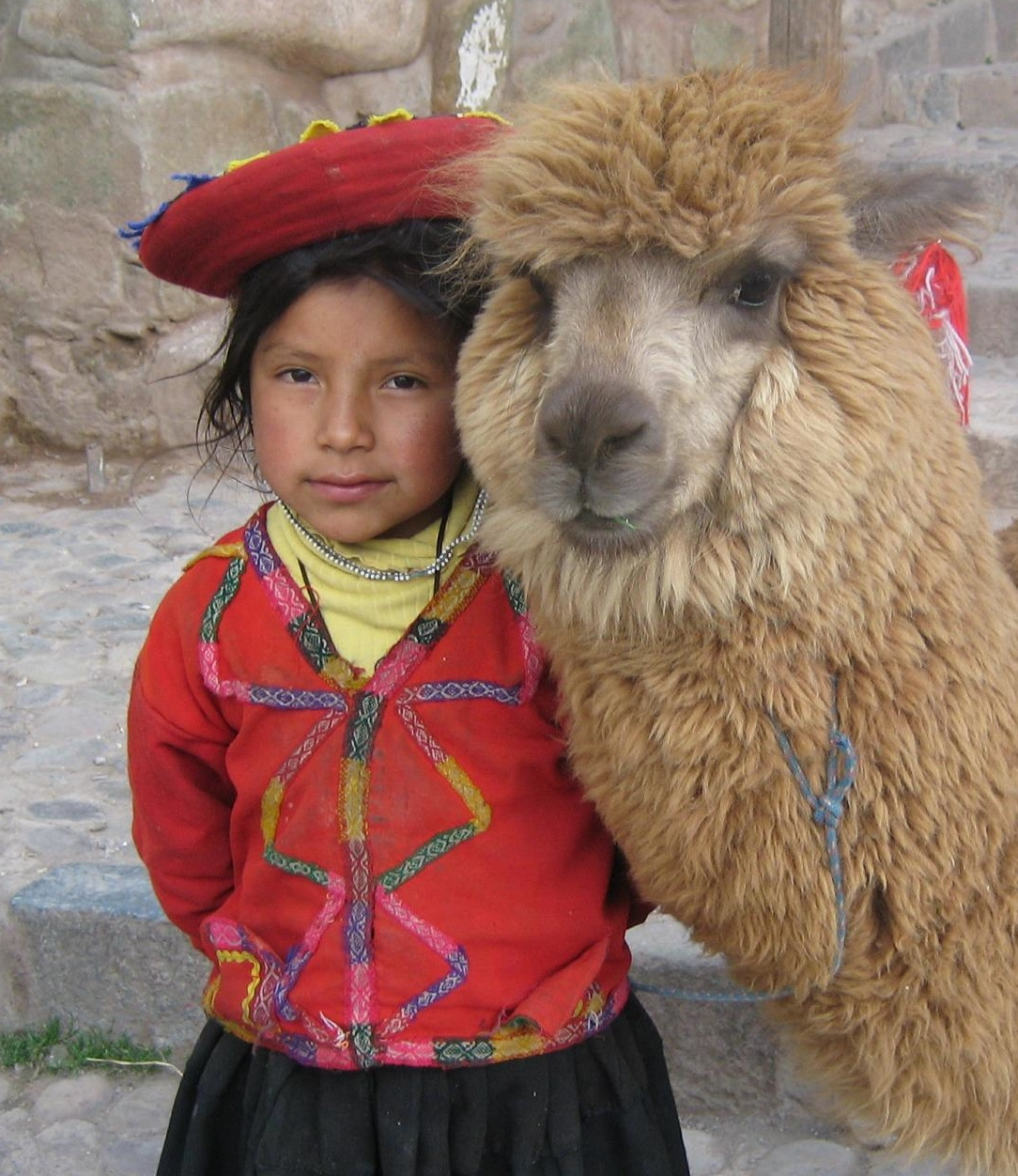
Peruvian girl.

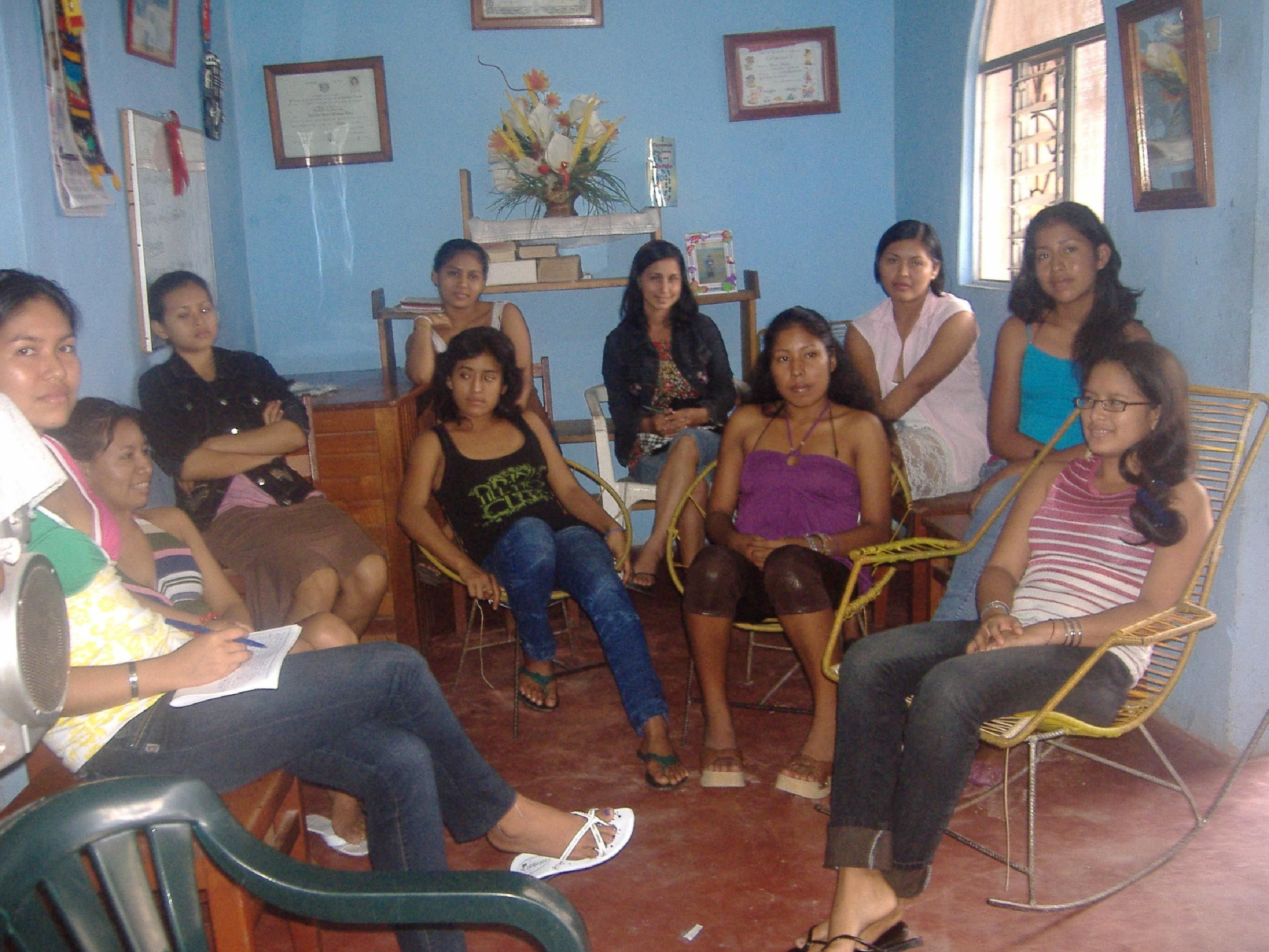
Peruvian women in Iquitos.

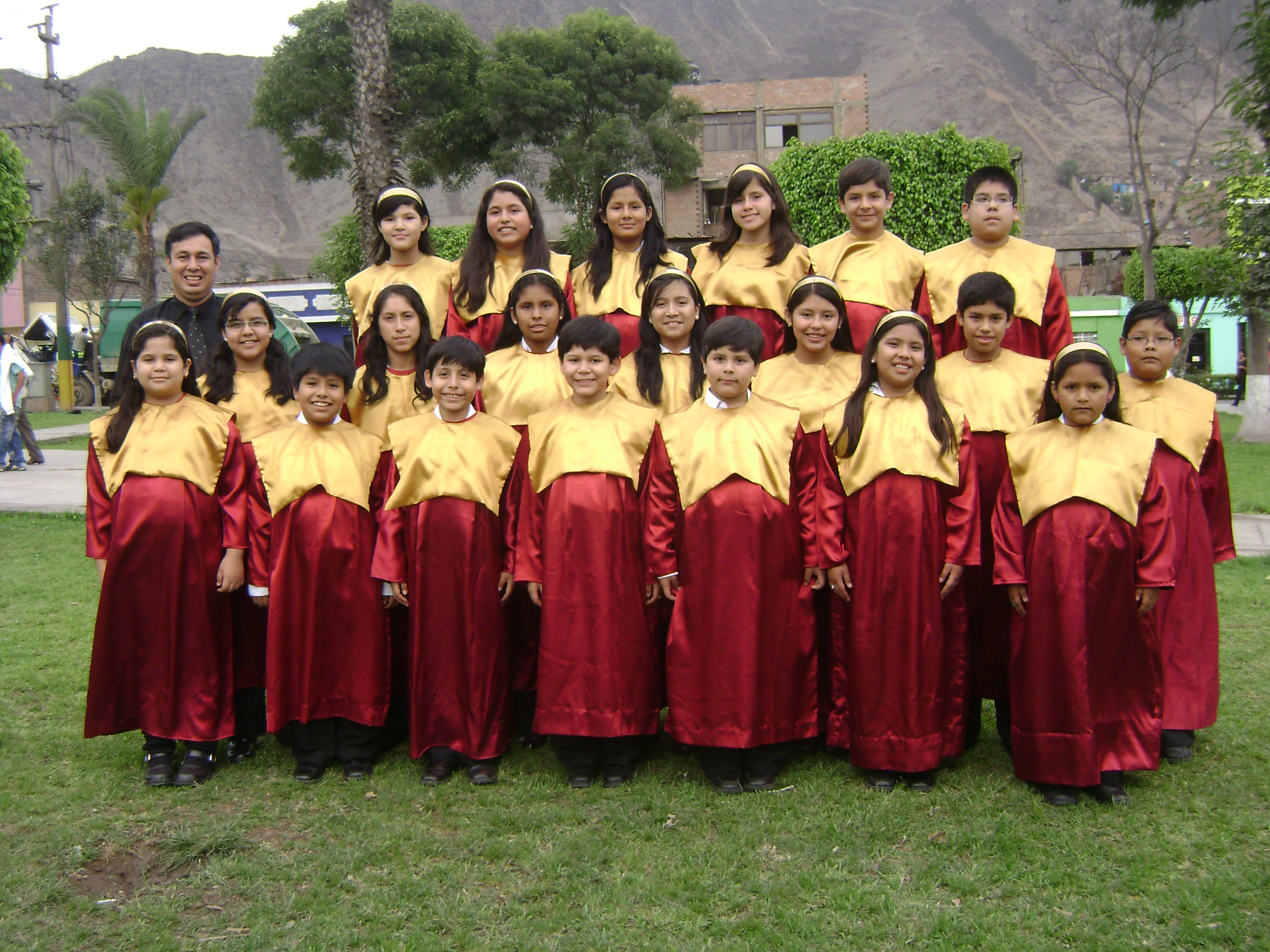
Children choir from El Agustino.

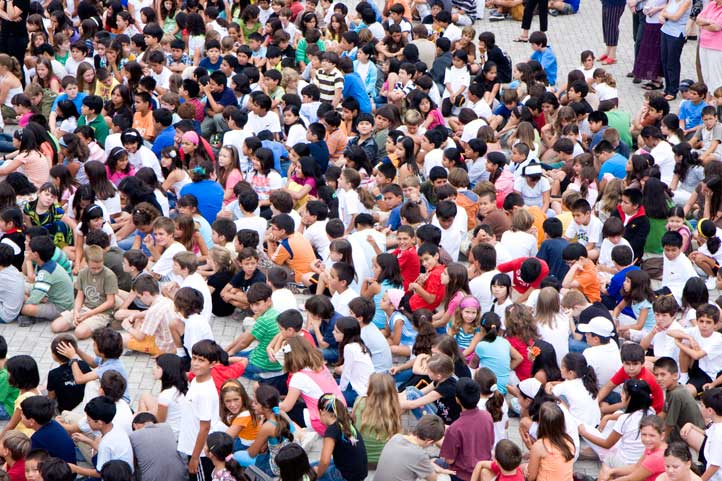
Children at Deutsche Schule Lima Alexander von Humboldt (German School) in Santiago de Surco, Lima.
