= Carapulcra =

Andean stew

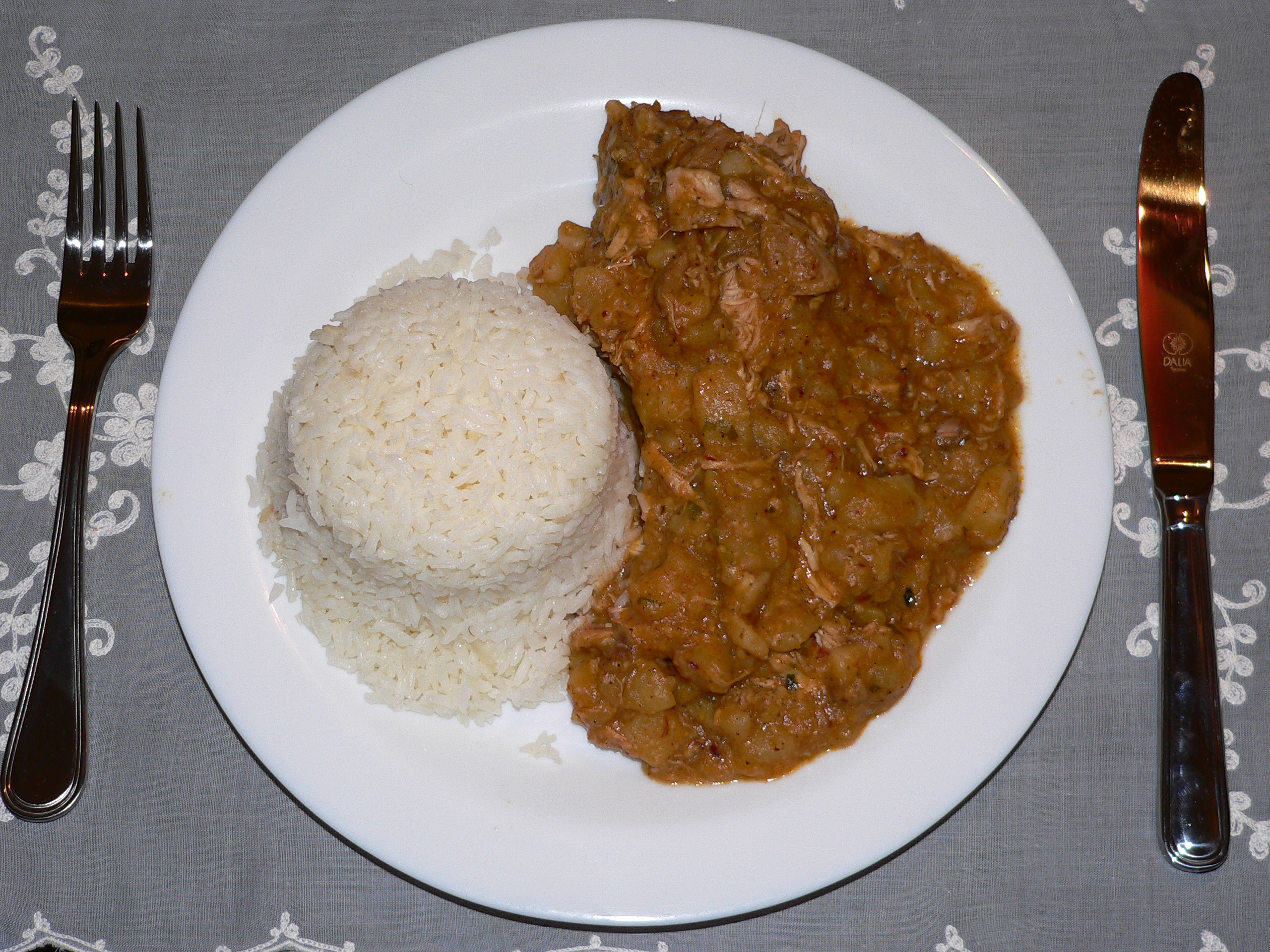
- A carapulcra dish
- Place of origin: Peru
- Region or state: South America
- Main ingredients: stew of pork, potatoes, peanut, aji panca, mirasol peppers, garlic, and clove

Carapulcra, or carapulca, is an ancient Andean dish that has been prepared for centuries by both Quechua peoples and Aymara peoples. The original term for this dish in the Aymara language is qala phurk'a, which means a stew made with hot stones. In contemporary Peruvian cuisine and Bolivian cuisine, it is a stew of pork and papa seca (dehydrated potatoes), with peanuts, aji panca and mirasol peppers, garlic, and other spices like clove. In ancient times llama meat or alpaca meat would have been used, and some people still use these meats today. It is usually eaten with rice, boiled potatoes or yuca.

== Name ==
Originally called carapulca, this stew has spread and is widely known in Lima as carapulcra (although this name is not accepted by the RAE). The name comes from the Aymara qala phurk'a, 'stew [made] on hot stones', and from the Quechua qalaphurka).

== See also ==
- List of Peruvian dishes
