= Aguadito de pollo =

Peruvian chicken soup

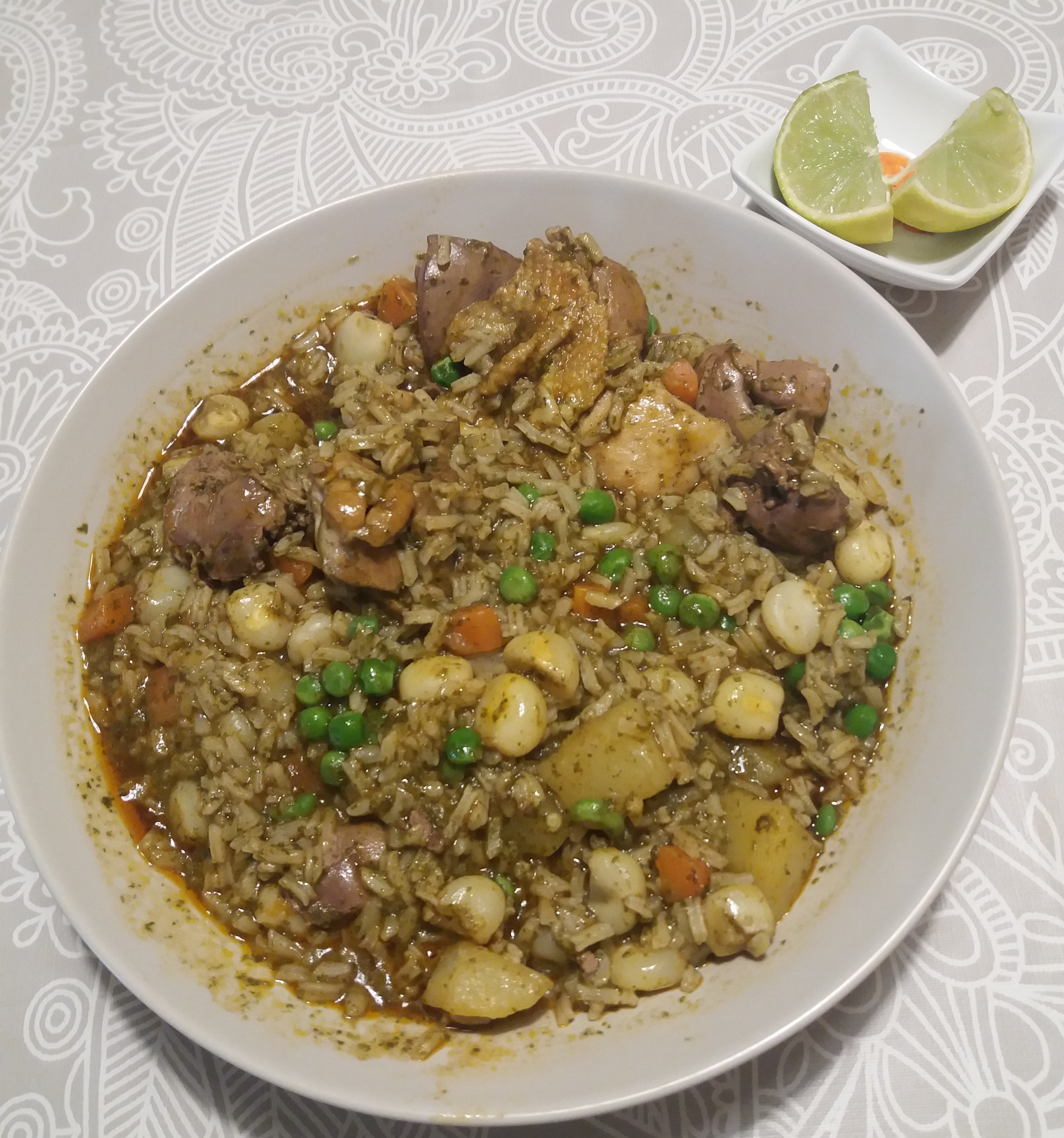
- Type: Soup
- Place of origin: Peru
- Main ingredients: Chicken
- Ingredients generally used: Offal, yellow potatoes, corn, peas, rice, carrots, yellow chili, coriander

Aguadito de pollo, also referred to as aguadito, is a traditional chicken soup in Peruvian cuisine consisting of chicken, cilantro and vegetables. The dish is prepared using large chunks of chicken and additional ingredients like chicken hearts, livers and gizzards. Other ingredients used can include potatoes, corn, peas, other vegetables, rice, noodles, red pepper and various spices. It typically has a pronounced green coloration due to a significant amount of cilantro used in the soup.

In Peru, aguadito de pollo is consumed in part for having a theoretical potential for easing or alleviating symptoms associated with the hangover.

== See also ==
- Hangover food
- List of Peruvian dishes
