= Ají panca =

Variety of Capsicum chinense grown in Peru

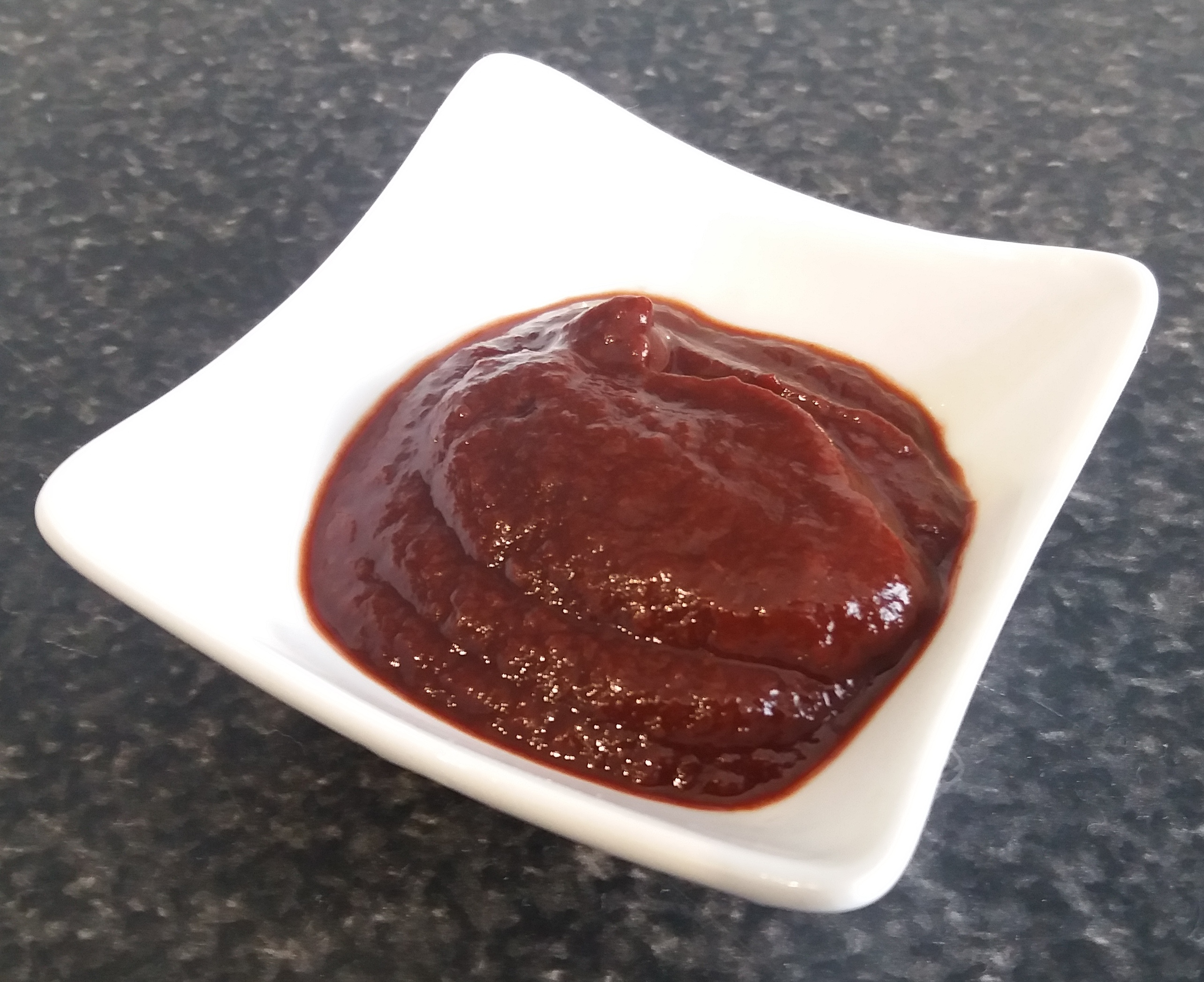
- Species: Capsicum chinense
- Origin: Peru
- Heat: Mild
- Scoville scale: 100 SHU

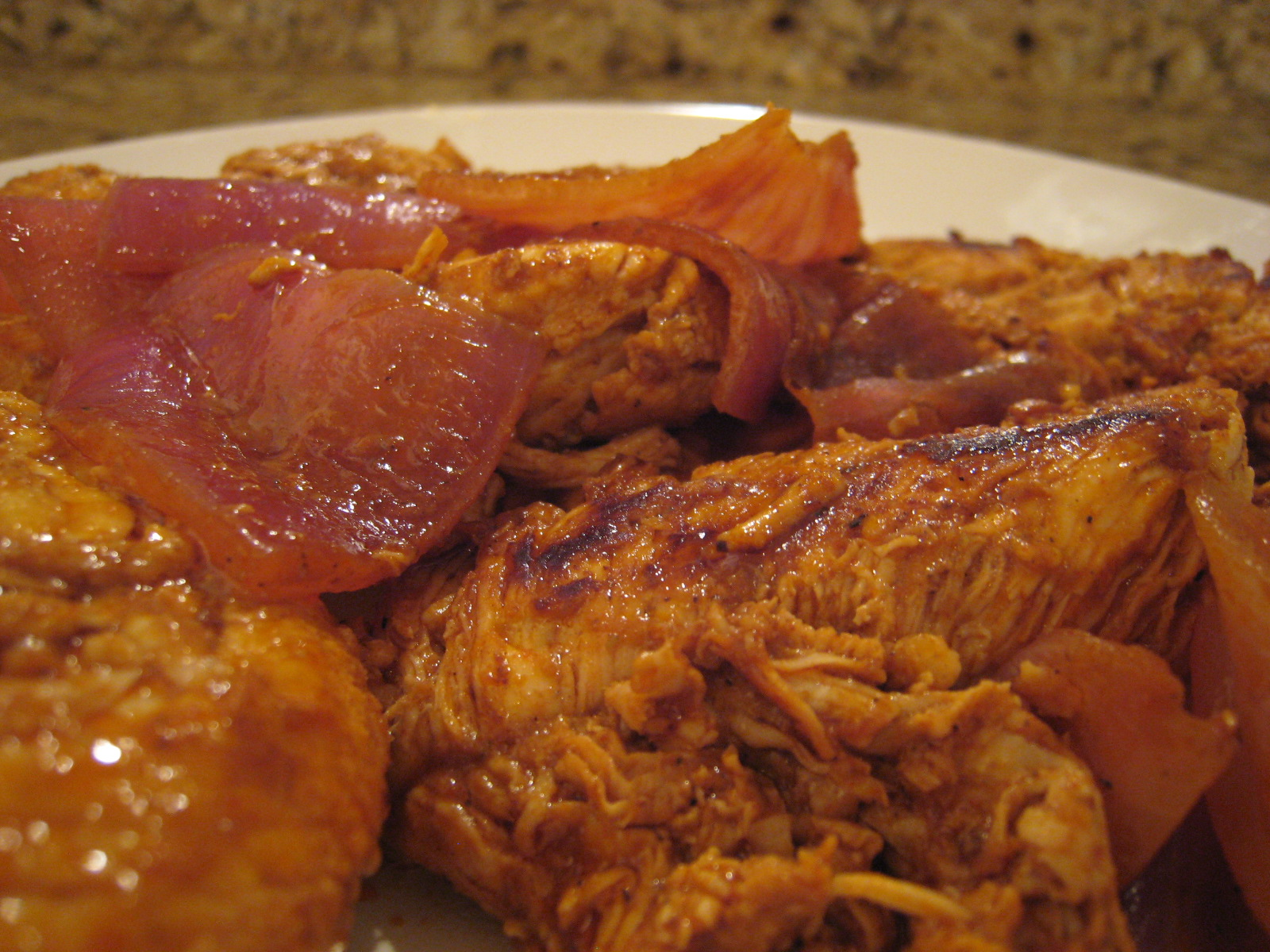
Peruvian adobo chicken with ají panca

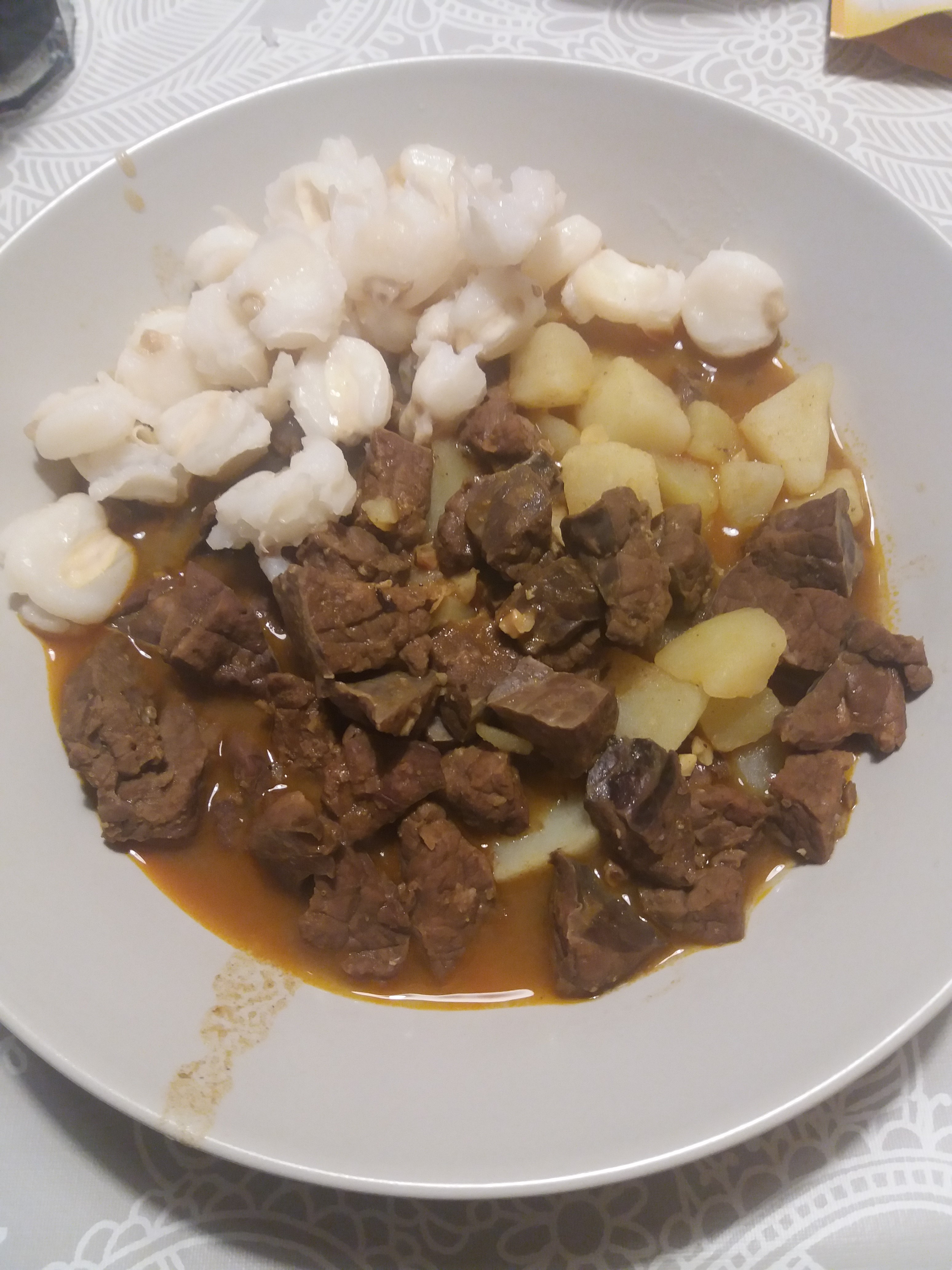
Peruvian chanfainita is made with bofe (cow lung) diced and cooked with diced potatoes with an ají panca sauce

Ají panca, Peruvian red pepper, is a variety of Capsicum chinense (a chili pepper) grown in Peru and used in Peruvian cuisine. It is commonly grown on the coast of Peru and measures 3 to 5 in (7.6 to 12.7 cm) long and 1 to 1.5 in (2.5 to 3.8 cm) across. It has thick flesh and fruity overtones, turning deep red to burgundy when ripe. It is commonly sun-dried at the farms and sold dry. It is very mild and if deseeded and deveined is considered to have no heat but is instead used for its flavor and color.

It is also appreciated in Ecuador, mostly in dried and powdered form, and mostly sold in traditional highlands markets.
