= Sol y Sombra =

After-meal alcoholic drink

Sol y sombra is an after dinner or breakfast alcoholic drink (or digestif), consisting of equal parts brandy and anise dulce (sweet anise or anisette) served in a brandy snifter, that is well known in Madrid and Spain generally. This is more than a single shot and is poured in a ratio of five seconds per each component. Alcohol for breakfast maybe an alien concept for many but a sol y sombra is commonly taken with a bar breakfast of coffee and churros or tostada in Andalucia.

The drink's name comes from the Spanish words for sun and shade and refers to different types of seats one can buy at bullfights. The cheap seats are Sol, and are in the full sun, whereas the most expensive seats are Sombra and are fully shaded. A Sol (Sun) y Sombra (Shadow) ticket has some shade and some sun throughout the day. The drink's name reflects this, as the drink is a combination of the dark brandy (sombra) and the clear anise (sol).
