= Jalea =

Peruvian seafood dish

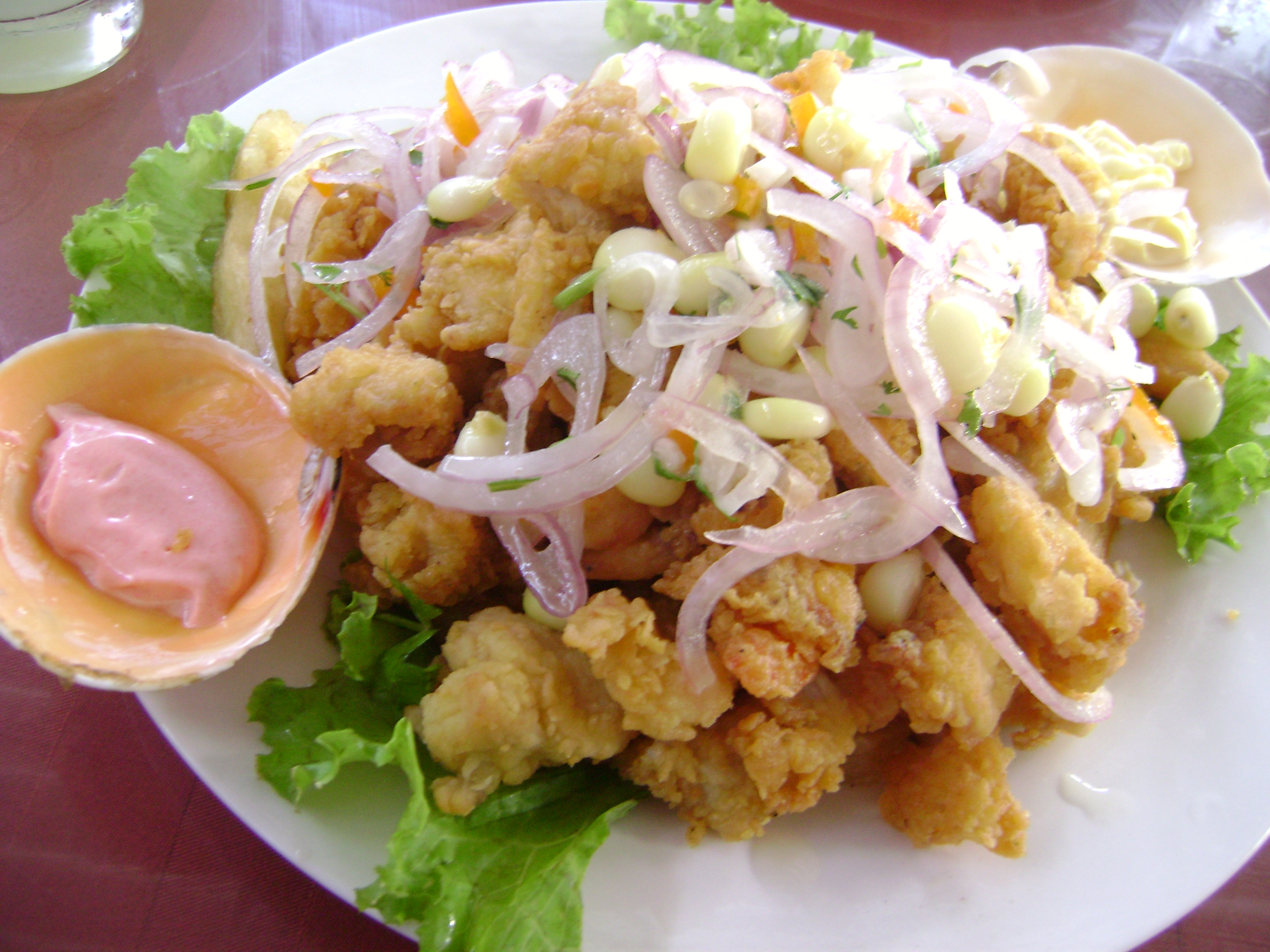
Jalea mixta (mixed) from Chiclayo, Peru

Jalea is a Peruvian cuisine dish consisting of fried fish, squid, and other seafood. It originates in the northern region, specifically in the regions of Lambayeque and Piura, and is influenced by the Moche culture.
