= Anticucho =

Meat skewer dish that originated in Peru

Anticuchos
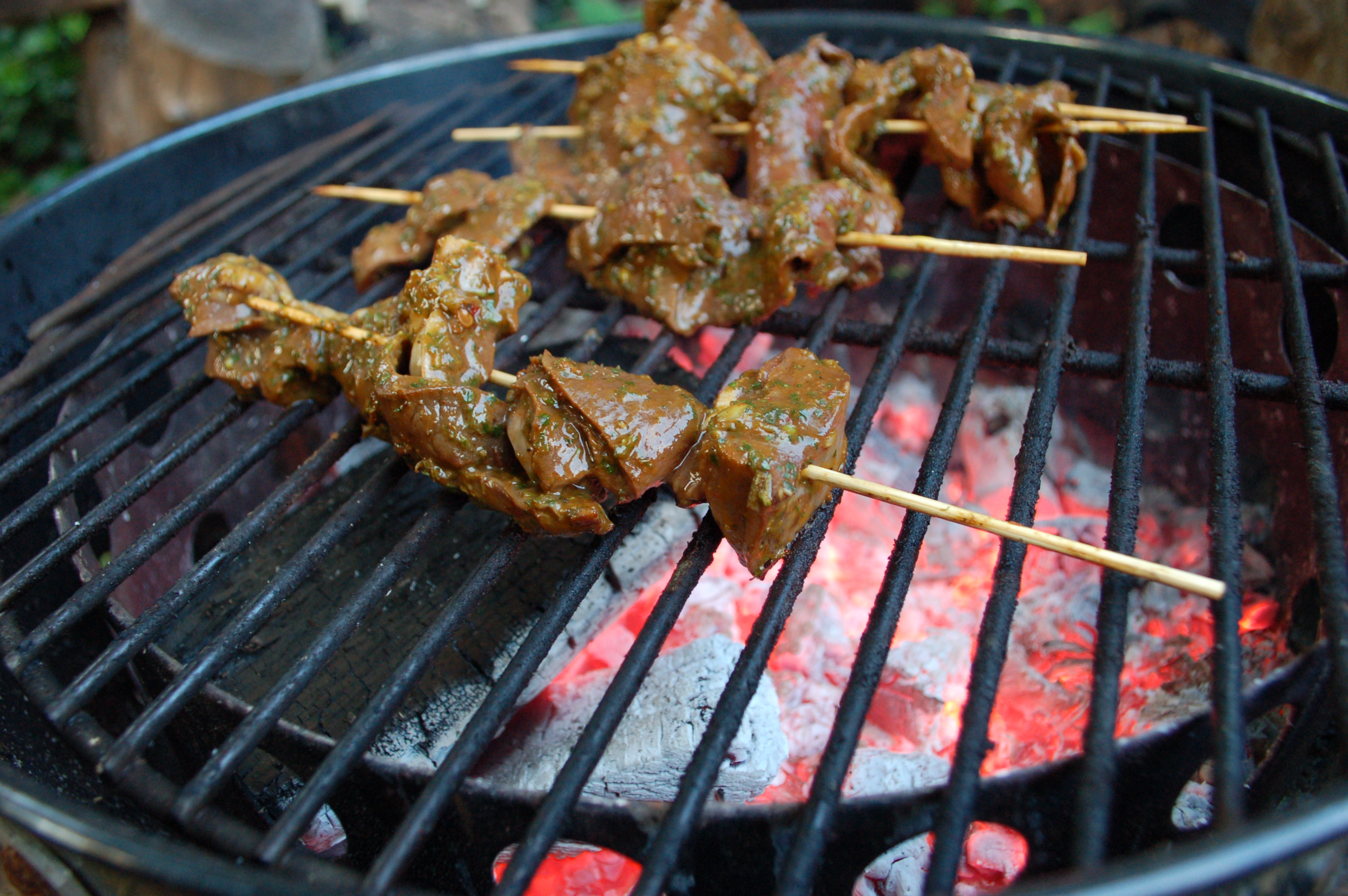
- A standard serving of Peruvian anticuchos.
- Alternative names: Anticuchos de corazon
- Type: skewer
- Course: Main dish
- Place of origin: Peru
- Region or state: Andes
- Serving temperature: Hot
- Main ingredients: Meat

Anticuchos (singular anticucho, Quechua 'Anti Kuchu', Anti: 'Eastern region of the Andes' or 'Eastern native ethnicities', Kuchu: 'Cut'; Quechua for 'Anti-style cuts', 'Eastern-style cuts') are popular and inexpensive meat dishes that originated in the Andes during the pre-Columbian era, specifically in the Antisuyu region of the Tawantinsuyu (Inca Empire). The modern dish was adapted during the colonial era between the 16th and 19th centuries and can now be found in Peru, Bolivia, Chile, and Ecuador, where they are known as "chuzos" or "carne en palito".

Anticuchos can be found on street-carts and street food stalls (anticucheras). The meat may be marinated in vinegar and spices (such as cumin, ají pepper and garlic). While anticuchos can be made of any type of meat, the most popular are made of beef heart (anticuchos de corazón). Anticuchos usually come with a boiled potato at the end of the skewer. A similar dish, shish kebab, is found in Mediterranean cuisine. In Peru, anticuchos are linked to the procession of Señor de los Milagros.

== History ==
Anticuchos are of Pre-Columbian origin. In the 16th century European ingredients such as garlic were added and beef began to replace the traditional llama that was used at the time of the Inca Empire. It was a popular dish among the inhabitants of the Inca Empire, and it is currently popular throughout most South American countries. Americanized versions of anticuchos are sometimes made of non-organ meats.

According to the text file from the National Library in Lima (Peru), it is believed that the term comes from the Quechua antikuchu (anti: 'East' + kuchu: 'cut' or uchu: 'porridge, mix'). The writer Erika Fetzer mentions that according to tradition, anticuchos were prepared with meat and flame. The Spanish strung the meat on sticks as skewers.

The Spaniards also brought enslaved Africans, who were concentrated in Lima and the coast of southern Peru of the Vice-royalty of Peru. In those days, the Spanish dismissed offal as food for slaves; the Spanish generally cooked with the "prime" cuts only. As a result, many traditional recipes use beef heart and other "off" cuts. In Peru, the tradition continues with the traditional name and ingredients; anticuchos are consumed by all social classes of Peru, and are especially popular as a street food.

== Anticuchos in the Andes ==
=== Cooking ===
Traditional anticuchos are made with beef heart slivers ranging from 2 cm x 2 cm to about 5 cm × 5 cm, roasted on a metal skewer about 30 to 40 cm (16 in) long and 3 × 3 mm in diameter.

They are seasoned with salt to taste, and sometimes with vinegar.

A popular dressing is a sauce made from garlic, onion, aji panca, cumin, black pepper, and beer, which is spread onto the anticuchos while cooking.

Anticuchos are usually not the main course of a meal, but rather an accompaniment to grilled meats along with other side dishes such as choripanes, potatoes, sausages and salads.

Variants include smaller sticks of wood; those 15 cm or less are called "meat skewers."

=== Peru ===
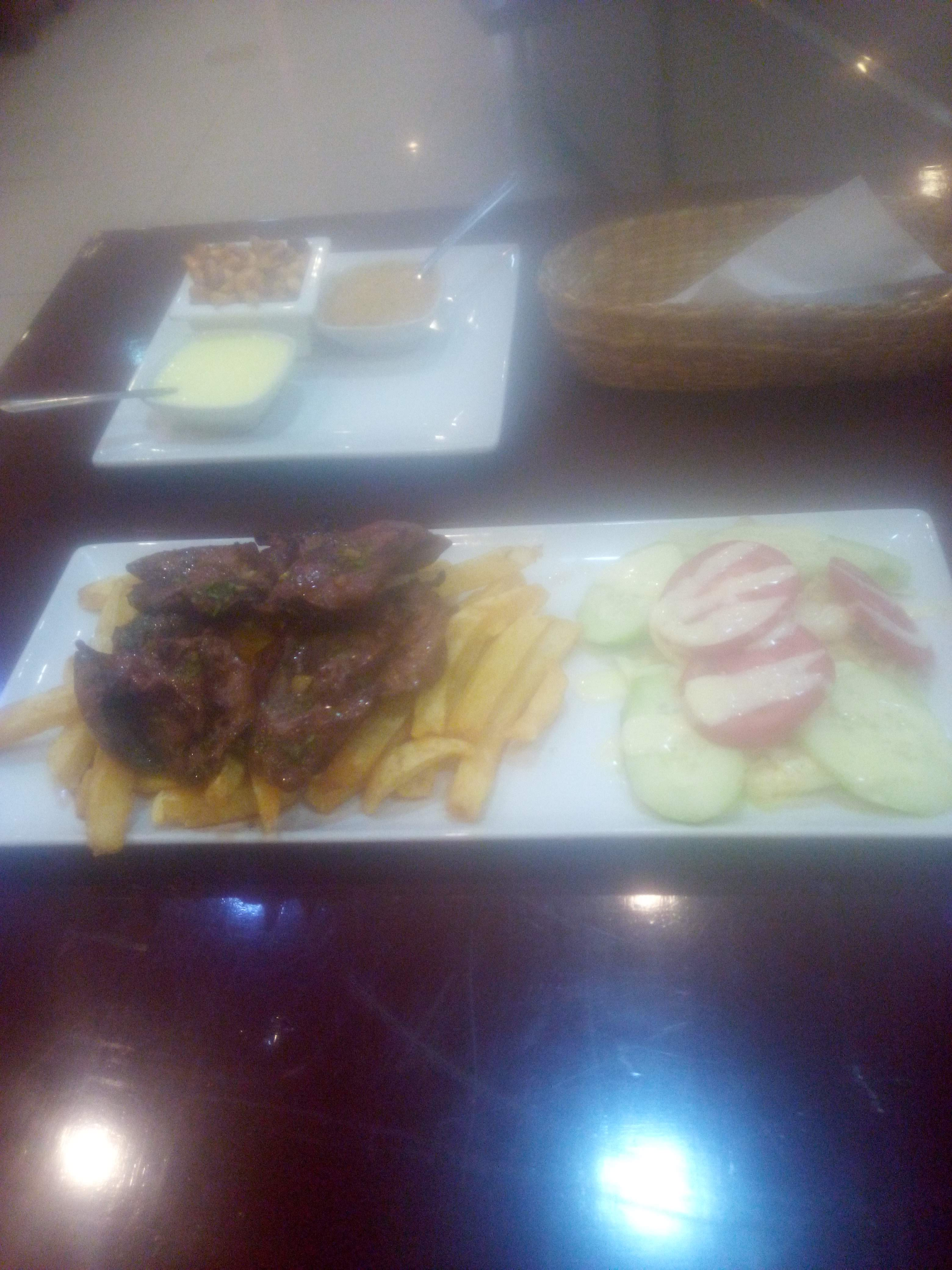
Anticuchos de Corazon served in restaurant in Arequipa

Anticuchos are part of traditional Peruvian cuisine. The greatest consumption in Peru is in July, during the celebration of Fiestas Patrias (Independence Day) in fondas and BBQs.

=== Bolivia ===
The Bolivian anticucho is a dish based on thin beef heart fillets marinated in spices, oil, and vinegar, cooked on skewers and over charcoal, and then served hot, mainly accompanied by roast potatoes and spicy sauce or peanut llajua. The anticucho is widely known as one of the favorite night delicacies dishes in innumerable parts of Bolivia. The vendors (affectionately known as "anticucheras") are easy to find on streets or boulevards and have a peculiar ritual to attract their clients, which consists of creating spectacular flames of fire that give off the irresistible aroma of the dish.

=== Ecuador ===
Known as "chuzos" in the Sierra Region and "carne en palito" in the Costa Region, they are a favorite night street food.

== See also ==
- List of meat dishes
- Şiş kebap
