= List of Danish desserts =

List of important desserts in Danish culture/history

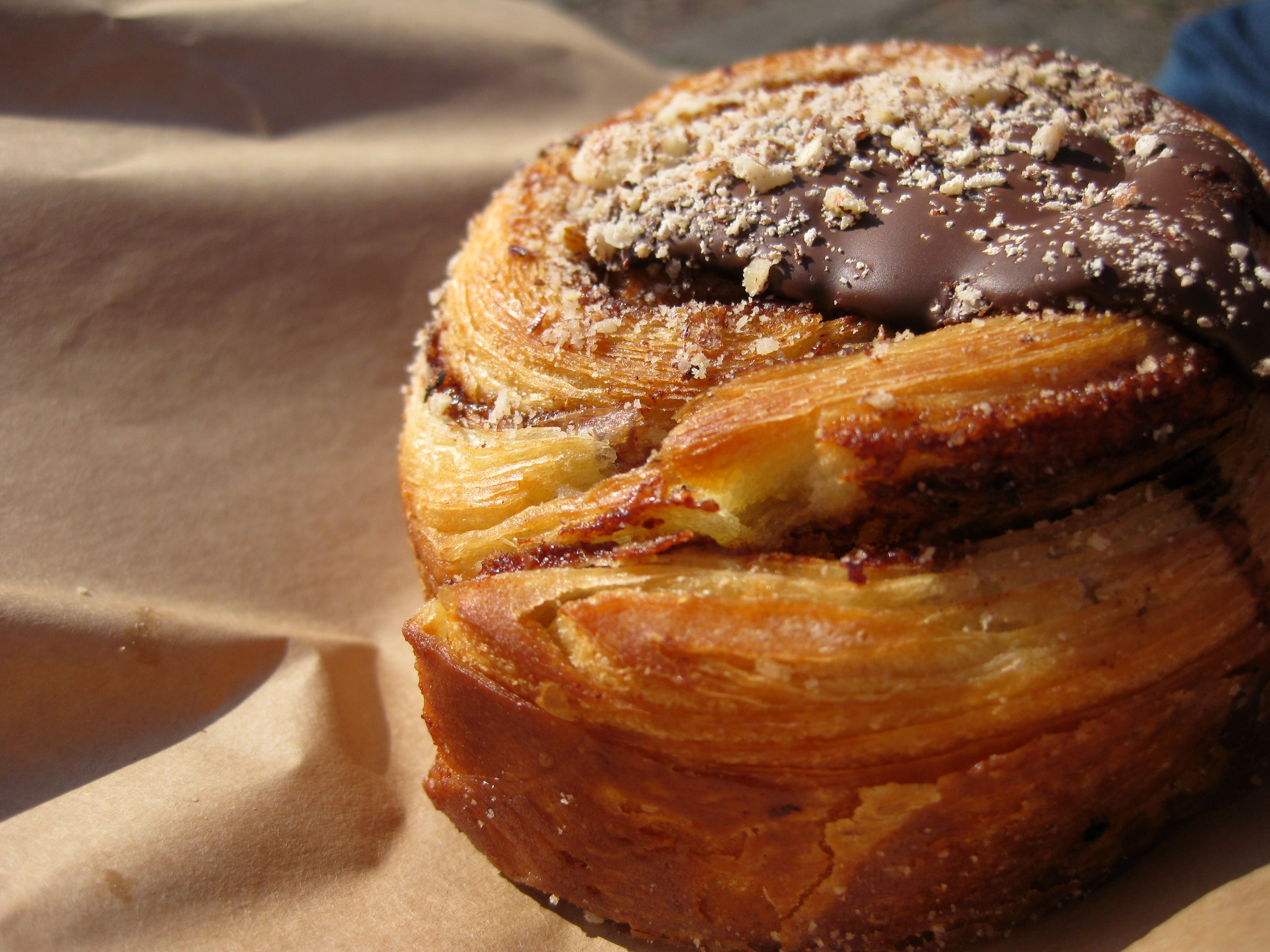
Glazed Kanelsnegl, a Danish cinnamon roll

This is a list of Danish sweets and desserts. The cuisine of Denmark refers to food preparation originating from Denmark or having played a significant part in the history of Danish cuisine. Denmark also shares many dishes and influences with surrounding Nordic countries, such as Sweden, Finland, and Norway.

== Characteristics ==
Danish desserts are heavily inspired by other desserts, cultures, and bakers throughout Europe. Specifically, the famous Danish pastry wienerbrød was first developed by Austrian bakers who immigrated to Denmark during a worker's strike. Other European desserts, such as profiteroles and riz à l'impératrice, have inspired the development of Danish desserts.

Frequently used ingredients include butter, sugar, various flours, dried fruit, nuts, chocolate, and different spices. Characterized by its cold climate, Denmark features desserts consisting of fruits that can survive the long, frigid winters, such as apples, redcurrants, cherries, cloudberries, and plums.

== Danish desserts ==
Name	Image	Description
Wienerbrød (Danish pastries)	Kringle; Kagemand	A Danish pastry is a multilayered, laminated sweet pastry; a derivative from the viennoiserie tradition. Types include: Kringle: Pastry flavored with almonds and butter, then rolled into a ring-shape; Kagemand: Boy- or girl-shaped cake made from brown-sugar-topped dough
Småkager (Danish cookies)	Pebernødder; Vaniljekranse; Kammerjunker; Jødekage	A Danish cookie is typically made from butter, flour, and sugar, with additional ingredients when needed. Types include: Pebernødder: a small cookie flavored with cardamom, cinnamon, mace or nutmeg, cloves, and white pepper; Vaniljekranse: vanilla butter cookie; Kammerjunker: twice-baked butter cookie flavored with cardamom and orange zest; Jødekage: sugar cookie topped with egg wash and chopped almonds, sugar, and cinnamon
Flødekager		Profiterole with a moist cream or custard filling
Lagkage		Layer cake with alternating layers of cream, sponge cake, or jam
Gåsebryst		Marzipan-covered cream cake
Kransekage		Cake made from layers of ring-shaped dough and icing
Studenterbrød		Thin, dense cake made from leftover pastries. Literally translates to "student bread" due to its cheapness of ingredients
Hindbærsnitte		Raspberry slice pastry
Kaj kage		Cake made in the shape of a frog
Pålægschokolade		Thin chocolate slice
Aebleskiver		Pancake balls, sometimes filled with jam or covered in powdered sugar
Risengrød		Rice pudding with cinnamon
Risalamande		Rice porridge dessert typically topped with fruit jam
Citronfromage		Lemon mousse dessert typically topped with whipped cream
Frugtsalat		Salad mixed with various fruits, nuts, chocolate, and marzipan, then topped with vanilla custard
Brunsviger		Crispy, square cake topped with brown sugar and cream
Koldskål		Drink made from buttermilk with yogurt, sugar, lemon juice, vanilla extract, and eggs

== Gallery ==
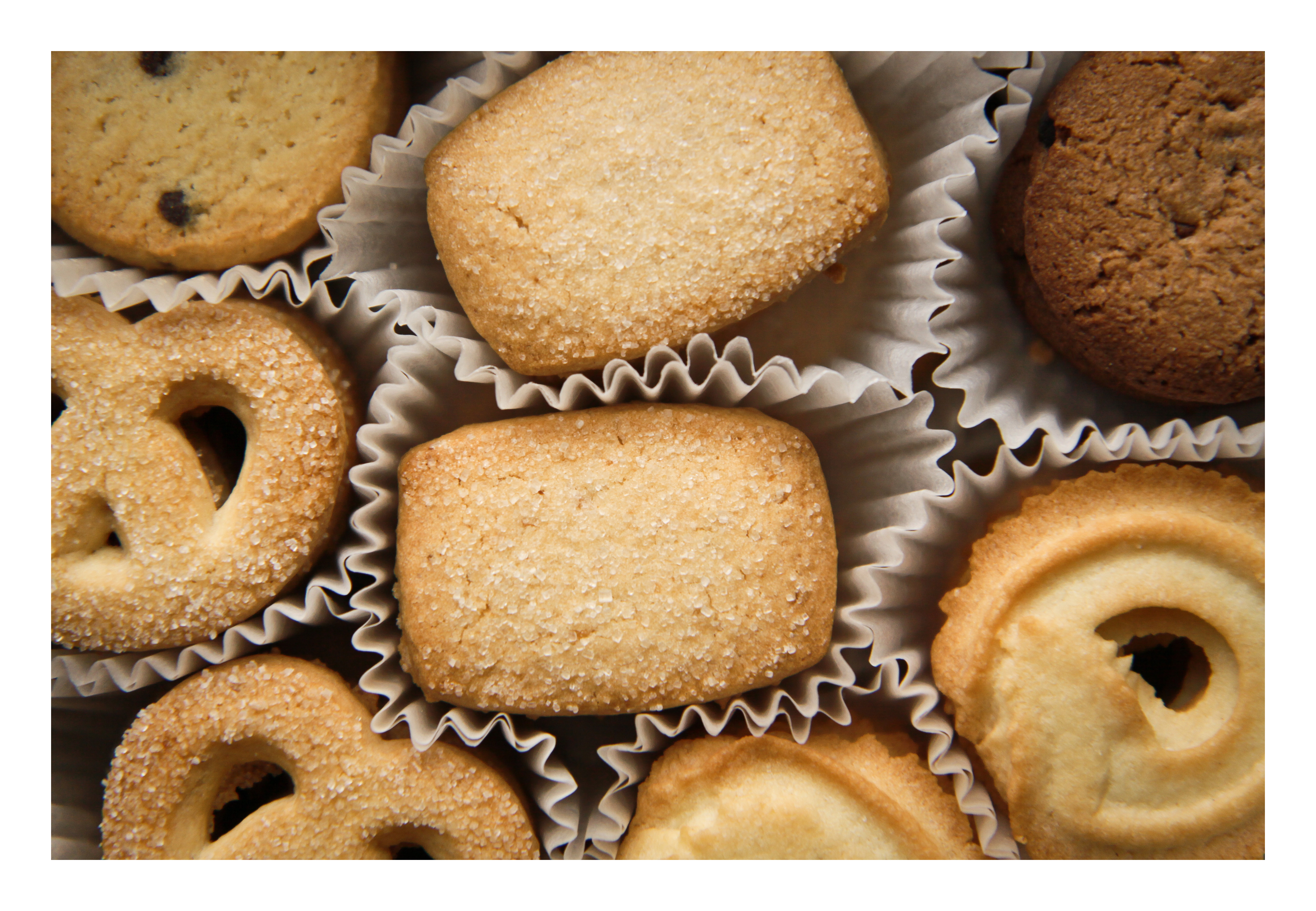
Danish cookies in wrappers

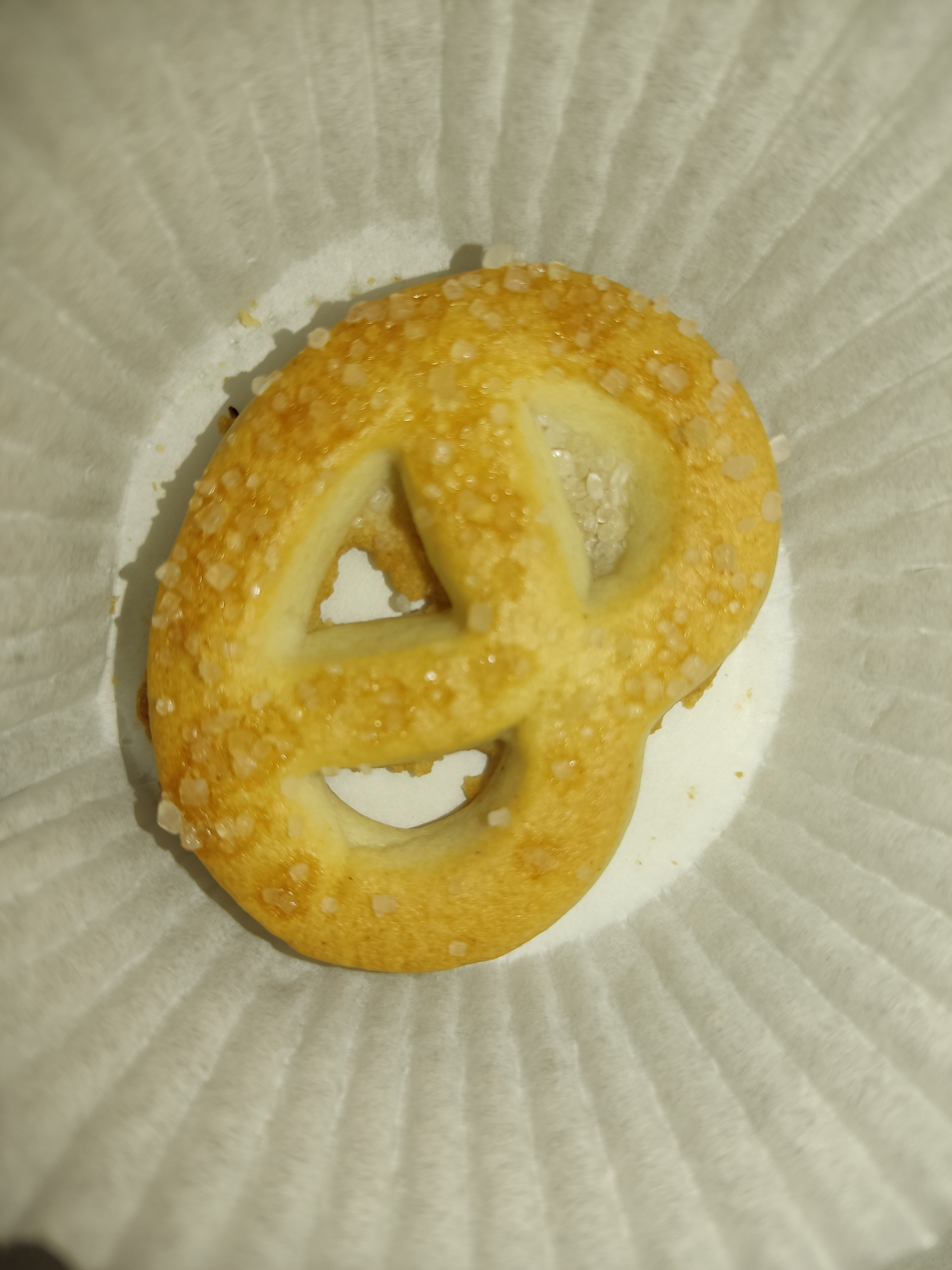
Small butter kringle

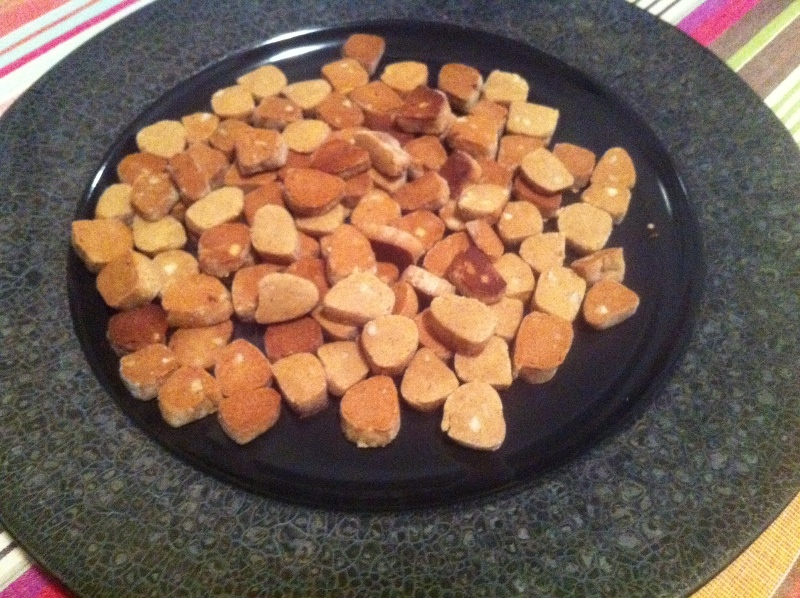
Lots of pebernødder

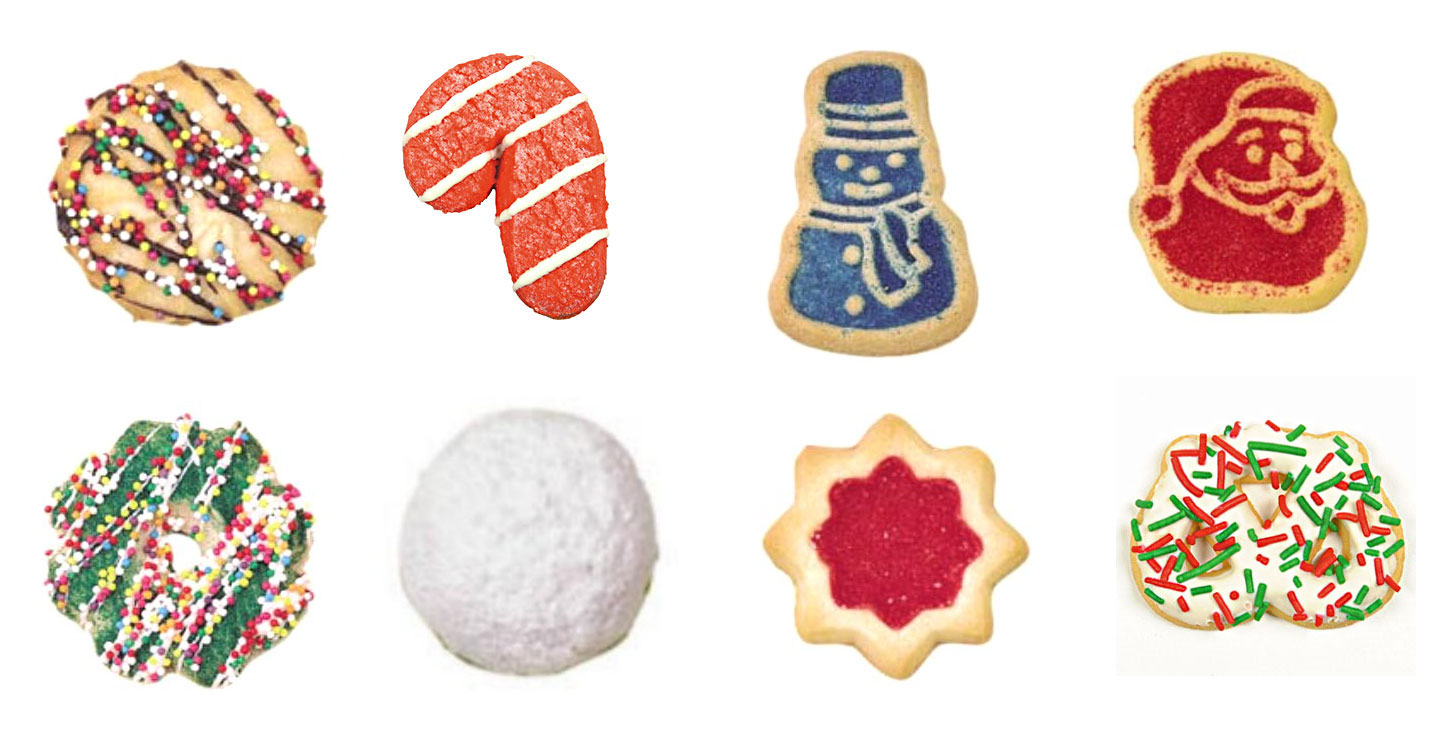
Types of Danish Christmas cookies

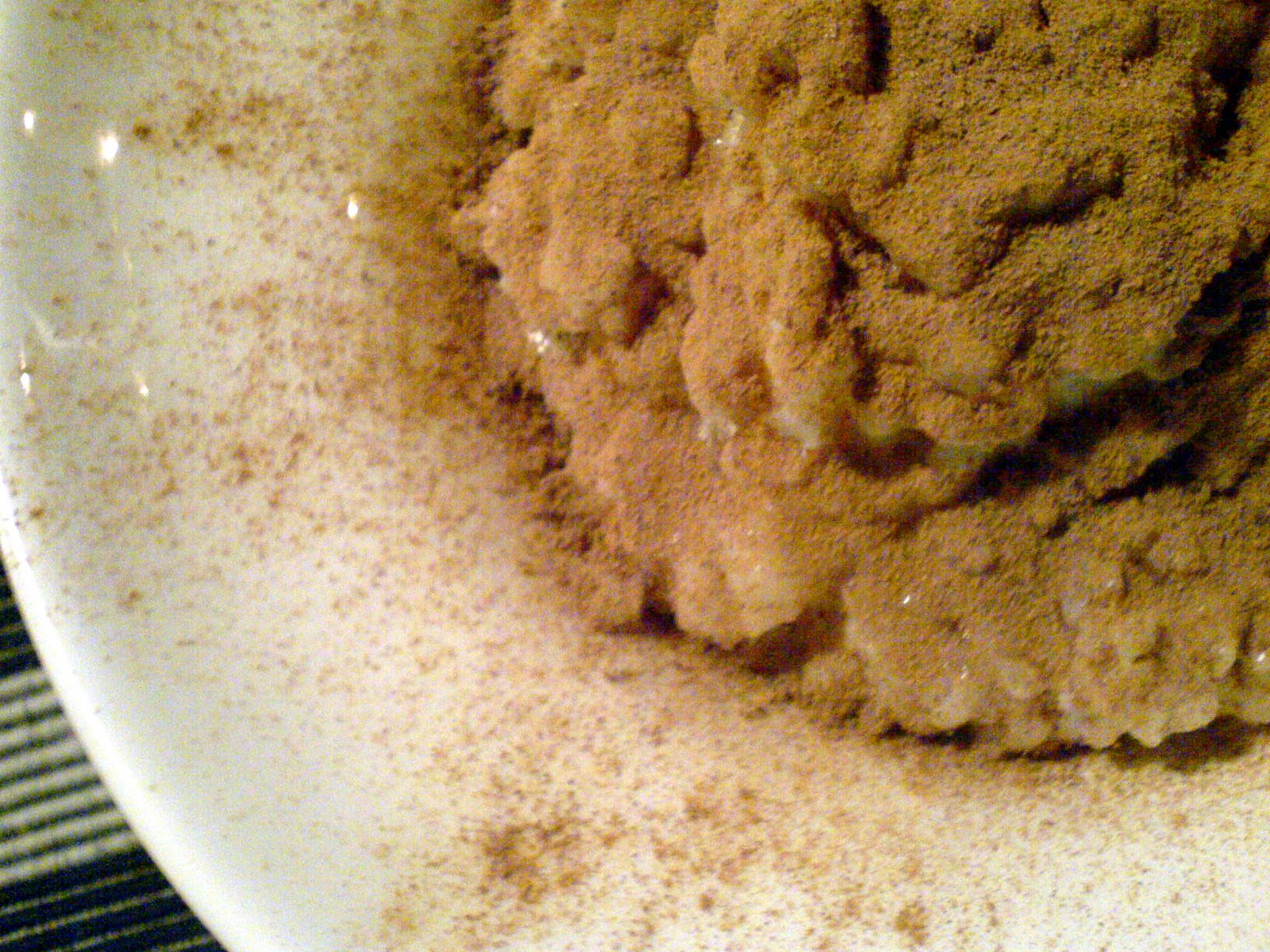
Plate of risengrød

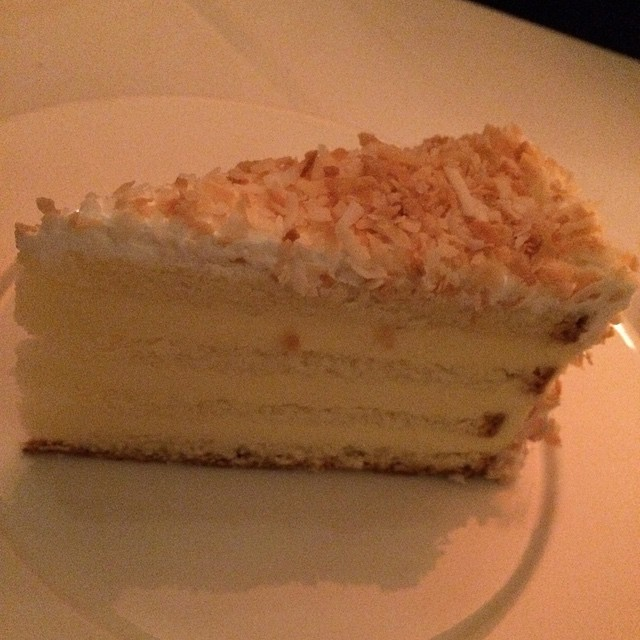
Coconut lagkage

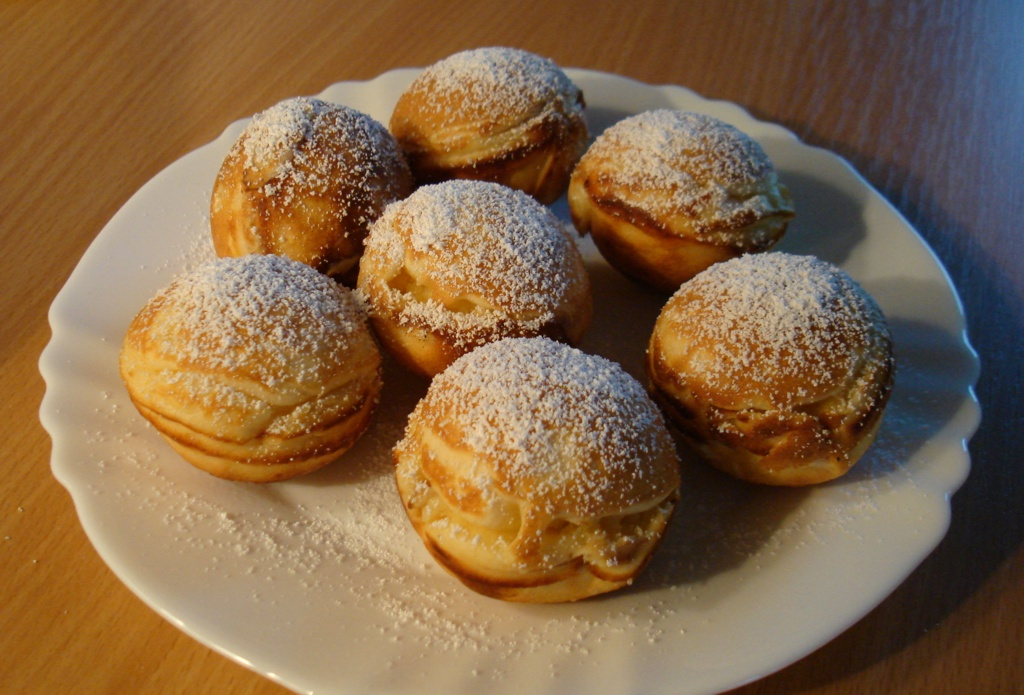
Tray of æbleskiver with cardamom

== See also ==
- Danish cuisine
- List of desserts
