= Arroz zambito =

Traditional Peruvian dessert

- Course: Dessert
- Place of origin: Peru
- Region or state: Lima
- Main ingredients: Rice, milk, chancaca (panela), raisins, pecans, cinnamon
- Similar dishes: Arroz con leche

Arroz zambito (literally "little dark rice") is a dessert typical of the Peruvian cuisine, specifically originating from Lima. It is considered a variant of the traditional arroz con leche (rice pudding). The primary difference is the addition of chancaca (unrefined whole cane sugar, known as panela in other regions), which gives the dessert its characteristic dark color and distinct flavor.

Historically, during the 19th century, the dessert was commonly sold by street vendors in Lima, who were predominantly Afro-Peruvian women.

== Description ==
The preparation method is very similar to that of rice pudding. The key ingredients include rice, milk, and chancaca, often flavored with spices such as anise, cloves and cinnamon. It is typically garnished or cooked with pecans, raisins (often golden raisins), and grated coconut.

The chancaca is the defining ingredient, also used in the syrup for picarones, which imparts the brown hue.

=== Etymology ===
The name "zambito" is a diminutive of the term Zambo, a racial classification used during the colonial era. In this culinary context, the name was adopted due to the dark brown color of the dish, resembling the skin tone associated with the term, distinguishing it from the white arroz con leche.

== See also ==
- List of Peruvian dishes
- Mazamorra
- Champús
