= Kamby arro =

Paraguayan dessert made of rice and milk

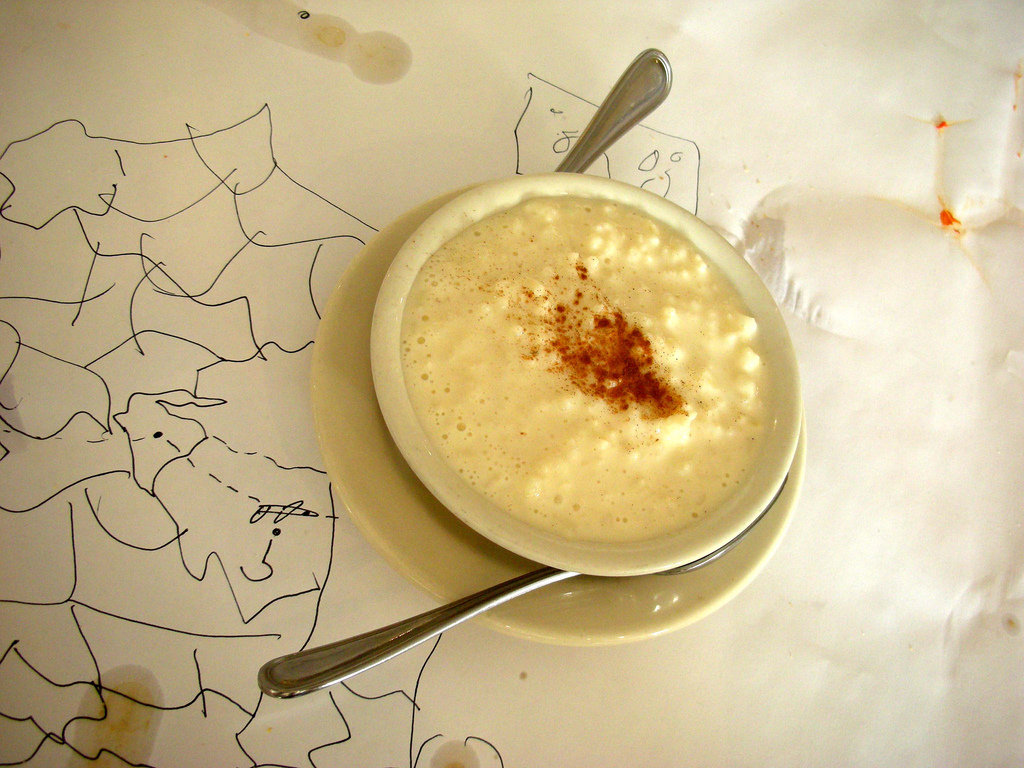
- Type: Pudding
- Place of origin: Paraguay
- Serving temperature: Cold
- Main ingredients: Cow’s milk, water, rice, sugar, lemon zest, cinnamon

Kamby arro is a common dessert in Paraguay. It is a variation of arroz con leche, a rice pudding produced from cooked rice and cow's milk.

== Origin of the name ==
The Spanish words directly refer to the dish's two principal ingredients, milk (leche) and rice (arroz).

Comparably, in Guaraní, kamby arro directly translates to the ingredients in the dish, kamby (milk) and arro (rice).

== Ingredients ==
There are many different ways to prepare kamby arró, thus the ingredients may vary according to each version.

The most traditional recipes use cow’s milk, water, rice, sugar, lemon peel and cinnamon.

== Preparation ==
The rice is first washed and poured into a pot with milk, sugar, water and lemon peel. The mixture is then boiled slowly until it acquires a thick texture while being mixed occasionally to avoid any rice sticking to the cooking appliance.

When the mixture becomes creamy, it is served in little containers. Cinnamon powder is dusted on the cream. The kamby arró is then served cold.

There is one variant in the preparation of the kamby arró in which vanilla is added to the ingredients mentioned above, thus creating a different flavor.

== Cultural views ==
In the Paraguayan country-side, the kamby arró is considered nutritious and a way to boost intelligence because of the use of cinnamon.
