= Risalamande =

Danish dessert served during Christmas

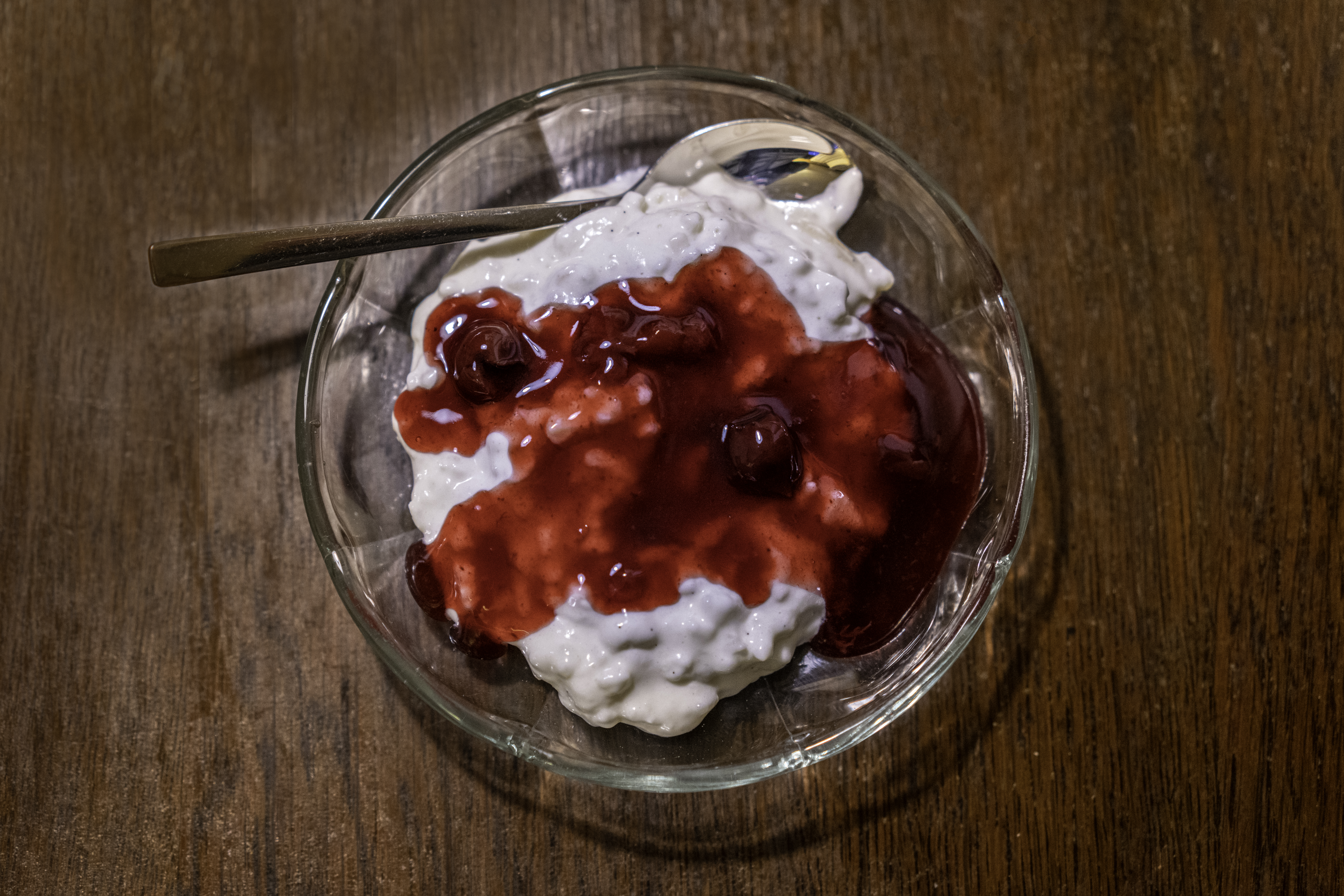
- Alternative names: Ris à l'amande
- Course: Dessert
- Place of origin: Denmark
- Region or state: Northern Europe
- Serving temperature: Cold
- Main ingredients: Rice pudding, almonds, whipped cream, vanilla

Risalamande (Danish pronunciation: [ˌri:salaˈmɑŋ] also spelled as ris à l'amande) is a traditional Danish dessert served at Christmas dinner and julefrokost (Christmas lunch). It is made of rice pudding mixed with whipped cream, sugar, vanilla, and chopped almonds. It is served cold with either warm or cold cherry sauce (kirsebærsovs). It is also served in the Faroe Islands where it is called rísalamang.

== Etymology ==
The name is based on French riz à l'amande meaning 'rice with almonds', although the dessert has a Danish origin. Today risalamande is the spelling documented by the Danish Language Council.

== History ==
According to a rumor, the invention of risalamande came about when a French cook or chef at the Hotel d'Angleterre in Copenhagen had to improvise a dessert.

Risalamande was inspired by the classical French dessert of riz à l'impératrice (empress rice) which is more solid, shaped in moulds and decorated with raspberry jelly.

As a tradition, rislamande is known from around 1900, meaning it was probably invented in the 19th century. Here, the kitchens of bourgeois homes began to serve risalamande with cherry sauce for Christmas instead of rice pudding. Before then, rice pudding was a more exclusive food, being made of imported rice, cinnamon and almonds. It was not until the rationing times during and following World War II that the rice pudding became the most common Danish Christmas food, that is in the first 50 years of the 20th century, and became more common as rice became both more cheap and common in the nation.

At some point, a tradition of giving a special additional prize to someone who found one whole almond hidden in the pudding, called mandelgaven "the almond present" was created, with the prize usually being in the form of a pink marzipan pig. It is believed that this tradition came from a French custom of the 1500s where on the Epiphany, also known as "Three Kings' Day", you would bake and serve a "Three Kings cake" or simply "king cake" in which one whole bean was hidden, and whoever got the bean was "king" for the night with all his privileges.

In general, the bourgeois of Denmark was rather "francophilic" and viewed French culture as one of the most sophisticated and fine ones. By eating rislamande for dessert, they could distance themselves from the more common Danish people who instead ate rice pudding as a starter.

The almond present is believed to have come about in Denmark around 1800 where the bean was replaced with an almond and the Holy Three Kings cake with the rice pudding.

== Use in Christmas tradition ==
Simple rice pudding (risengrød) can be served all year in Denmark, but is also often seen as a Christmas dish. It is served hot and topped with cinnamon and butter, often along with malt beer (hvidtøl).

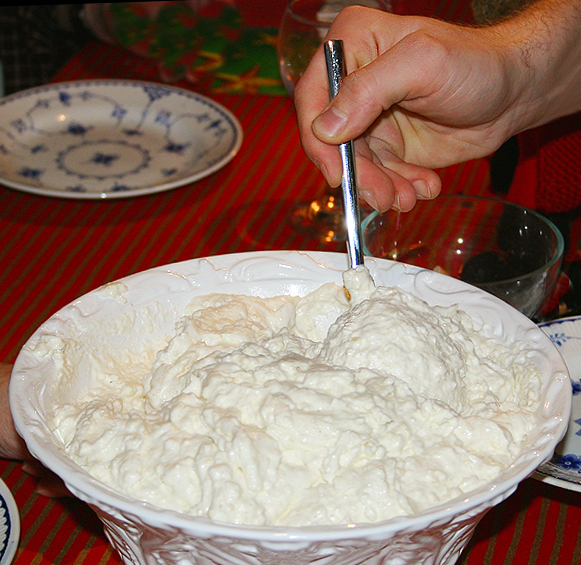
A bowl of rice pudding.

Some families make a large batch of rice pudding for dinner on December 23 (lillejuleaften meaning 'Little Christmas Eve') and keep a part of it for preparing risalamande as a dessert after the big Christmas dinner. Others eat hot rice pudding as part of the Christmas dinner, usually as a starter and more rarely as a dessert. This is often regarded as an older tradition than the risalamande.

According to tradition, hot rice pudding is also the dish eaten by nisser, the Christmas elfs, which is common in other Nordic countries too. As such, children may put out a bowl of rice pudding, and if eaten (possibly by a cat, or more often, the parents), it will demonstrate the existence of the nisse. This usage is derived from the ancient belief in house spirits.

On Christmas Eve, a whole almond is added to the dessert, and the person who finds it wins a small prize such as a marzipan pig, a chocolate heart or a small board game. The finder may conceal their discovery as long as possible, so that the rest of the partygoers are forced to eat the entire dish of risalamande, even after they have already devoured a large Christmas dinner.

== In Sweden, Finland, Norway and Iceland ==
In Sweden, this dish is called ris à la Malta. Typically it is made of chilled leftover rice pudding, whipped cream, sugar and vanilla, with or without almonds. By tradition, the person finding a hidden almond in the dessert is expected to get married before the next Christmas. A variety containing diced oranges is called apelsinris. The dish is mostly served with either a smooth cordial, jam or semi-thawed frozen berries.

In Finland, this dish is called Maltan riisi, Typically it is made of chilled leftover rice pudding, whipped cream, sugar and vanilla, with or without almonds. By tradition, the person finding a hidden almond in the dessert is very lucky whole year. In Finland, it can be served with puree made of raspberry (or even lingonberry) or raisin compote.

Norwegians have a similar dish called riskrem 'rice cream' and, as in Denmark, the person finding a hidden almond in the dessert wins a mandelgave (almond present) in the form of a marzipan pig or the like. The dessert may contain almonds for flavour, but mostly chopped on top as decoration. In Norway, the sauce is also normally made of raspberry (or even strawberry) rather than cherry.

In Iceland, this dish is called Ris a la mande or möndlugrautur (almond pudding) and served with cherry jam. It is made of rice pudding which is cooled overnight before adding whipped cream, sugar and chopped almonds. The dish is served at lunch on Christmas Eve. Typically a whole almond with the skin on is hidden in the pudding and the person who finds it receives a present.

== Risifrutti ==
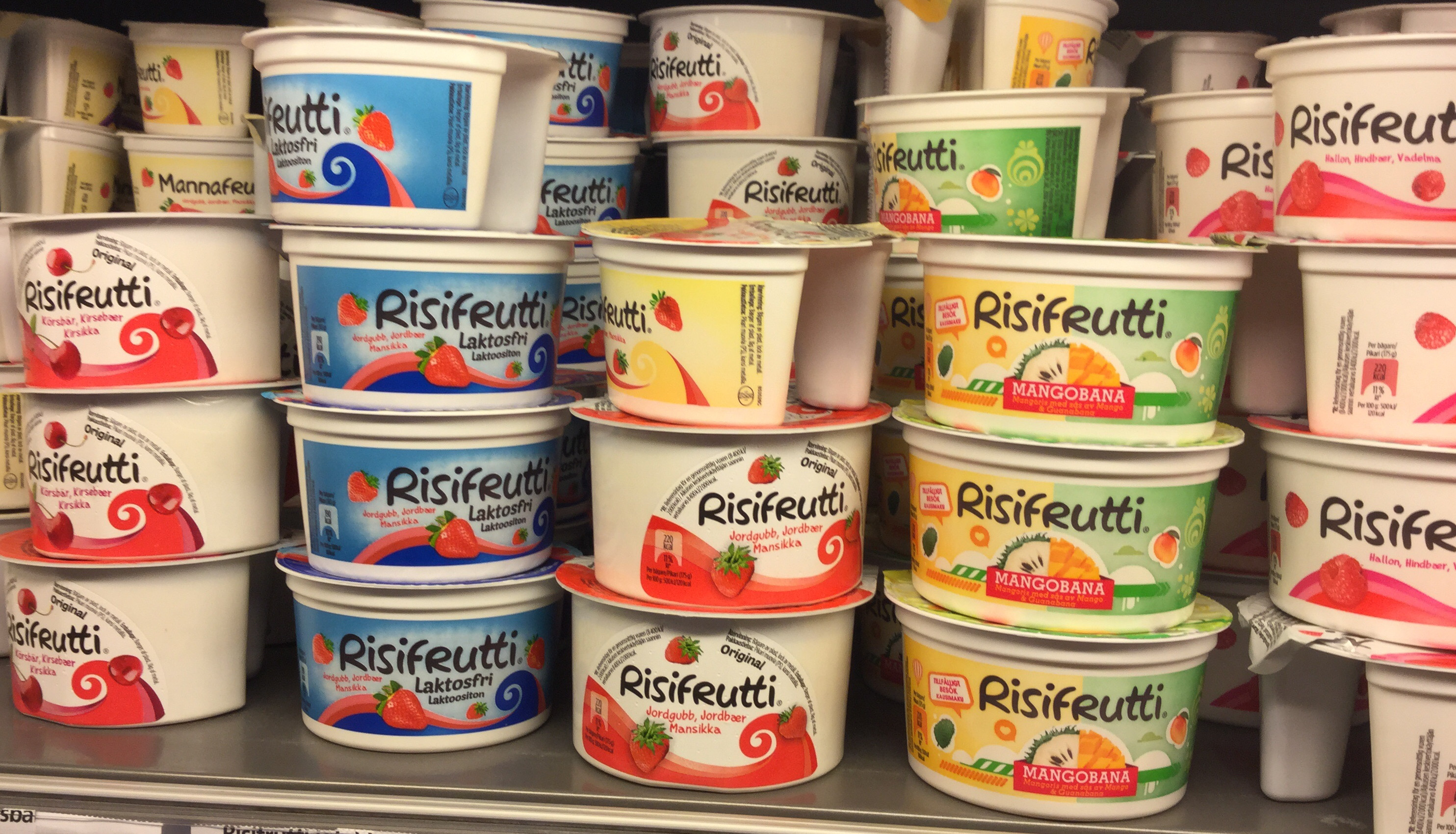
Risifrutti for sale in a grocery store

Risifrutti is a ready-to-eat snack product inspired by risalamande, sold in the Nordic countries since 1993. Various sauces exist, such as strawberry, cherry, blueberry, and raspberry.

However, ready-to-eat products marketed as risalamande (and more similar to the actual dessert) also exist.

== See also ==
- Glorified rice
- Danish cuisine
- List of Christmas dishes: Denmark
- Christmas worldwide: Denmark
