= Tregar =

Argentine dairy company

García Hermanos Agroindustrial S.R.L.
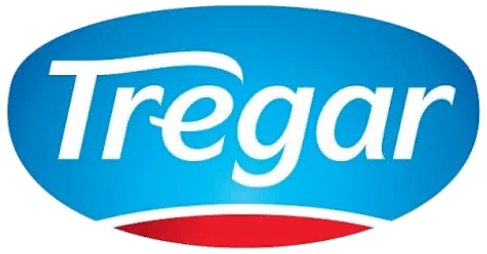
- Trade name: Tregar
- Company type: S.R.L.
- Industry: Dairy
- Founded: 1940s
- Founder: Cipriano García; Hortensia de Simón
- Headquarters: Gobernador Crespo, Argentina
- Products: Milk, cheese, cream cheese, yogurt, rice pudding
- Net income: AR$239 million (2009)
- Owner: García Family
- Number of employees: 300 (2020)
- Website: tregar.com.ar

García Hermanos Agroindustrial S.R.L. (mostly known for its trade name Tregar) is an Argentine dairy company headquartered in the city Gobernador Crespo, Santa Fe Province. Established in the 1940s, it has since remained in the hands of the founding family. It owns two production plants, the main one (95,800 m2) located in Gobernador Crespo, and another one in Calchaquí (also in Santa Fe, 12,800 m2).

As of February 2020, the company employed 300 people in its two plants. Tregar processes about 250 million liters (66 million gallons) of milk a year, purchased from over 320 small producers. The company manufactures yogurts, rice pudding, dulce de leche, a variety of cheeses, and other dairy products. It exports a 30% of its output, primarily to Russia, Brazil, Algeria, Chile, Asia and Western Africa.

In 2019, it was awarded an AlimentAR prize for its accomplishments in increasing exports.

== History ==
Tregar was founded in the 1940s by a couple of Spanish immigrants, Cipriano García and Hortensia de Simón. During it first period, the company only produced milk, but later expanded as a handcraft cheese producer. Their three sons, Florencio, Vicente and Pedro established

The founders' sons (Florencio, Vicente, and Pedro) expanded the small enterprise, transforming it into the García Hermanos Company. In the first years of the 21st Century, it benefited on the crisis of big rival company SanCor, which lost a big market share.

In 2004, the company launched its yogurt product line and, in 2013, its fluid long-life UHT milks.

== Products ==
=== Yogurts ===
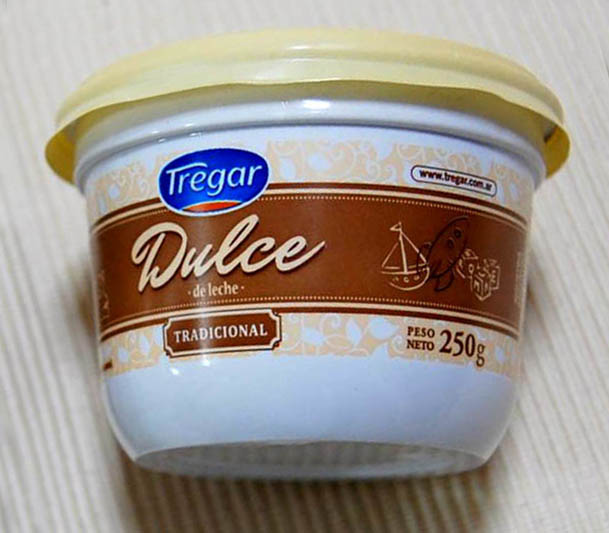
Dulce de leche

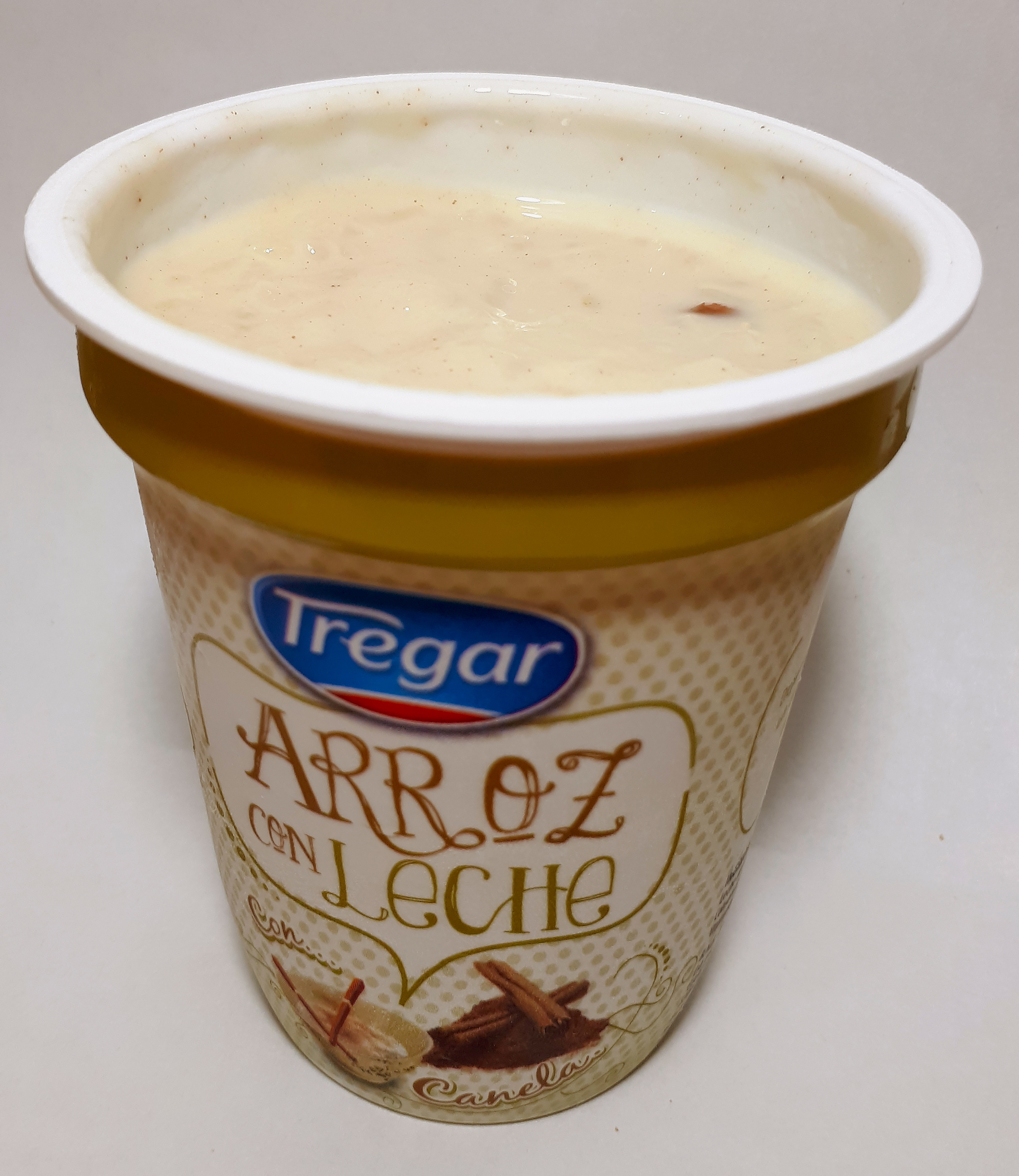
Rice pudding flavored with cinnamon

- Whole Yogurt (Strawberry, Dulce de leche, Vainilla)
- Low-Fat Yogurt (Vainilla, Strawberry)
- Whole Yogurt with fruit pieces (Blueberry, Pineapple, Strawberry, Peach, Mango-Maracuyá)
- Low-Fat Yogurt with fruit pieces (Blueberry, Strawberry, Peach)
- Yogurt with cornflakes, whole and low-fat
- Whole Drinkable Yogurt (Vainilla, Strawberry)
- Low-Fat Drinkable Yogurt (Vainilla, Strawberry)

=== Dulce de Leche ===
- Classic
- Repostero (For confectionery)

=== UHT Milk ===
- Whole
- Low-Fat
- Low-Fat, Low-Lactose
- Chocolate Milk
- Flavored (Strawberry, Dulce de leche, Vainilla)

=== Cheeses ===
- reggianito
- Criollo
- Pategrás
- Holanda (Gouda cheese)
- Mozzarella
- Danbo
- Cream Cheese
- Port Salut
- Fontina
- Blue cheese
- Brie
- Cream cheese spread
- Mascarpone
- Flavored Cheese spread (Blue cheese, Ham, Salami, Cheddar)

=== Other dairy products ===
- Rice pudding (Classic, and flavored: Cinnamon, Dulce de Leche, Chocolate, Light)
- Cream
- Crème Chantilly
- Ricotta
