= Teurgoule =

Rice pudding from Normandy

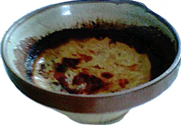
- A tergoule cooked in its traditional terrine
- Alternative names: Teurt-goule, torgoule, bourre-guele, terrinée
- Type: Rice pudding
- Place of origin: France
- Region or state: Normandy
- Main ingredients: Rice, milk, sugar, cinnamon

Teurgoule is a rice pudding that is a speciality of Lower Normandy, where traditionally it was popular at village festivals, and today it remains a family dish. It consists of rice cooked in milk, sweetened with sugar, and is flavoured with cinnamon and sometimes nutmeg. It is baked in an earthenware terrine for several hours. Long cooking creates a thick, brown caramelised crust over the teurgoule.

The name comes from the Norman language and means 'twist mouth', a reference to the faces supposedly pulled or twisted by someone tasting it due to the spiciness of the dish.

Teurgoule even has a brotherhood, Confrérie des gastronomes de Teurgoule et de Fallue de Normandie, which is based in Houlgate and presides over the annual teurgoule-cooking competition. The presiding members wear the brotherhood's ceremonial robe, which is green and orange with a cape. The brotherhood keeps the official recipe.

Alternative names for teurgoule include teurt-goule, torgoule, bourre-goule and terrinée.
