= Rice pudding =

Sweet rice and milk dish

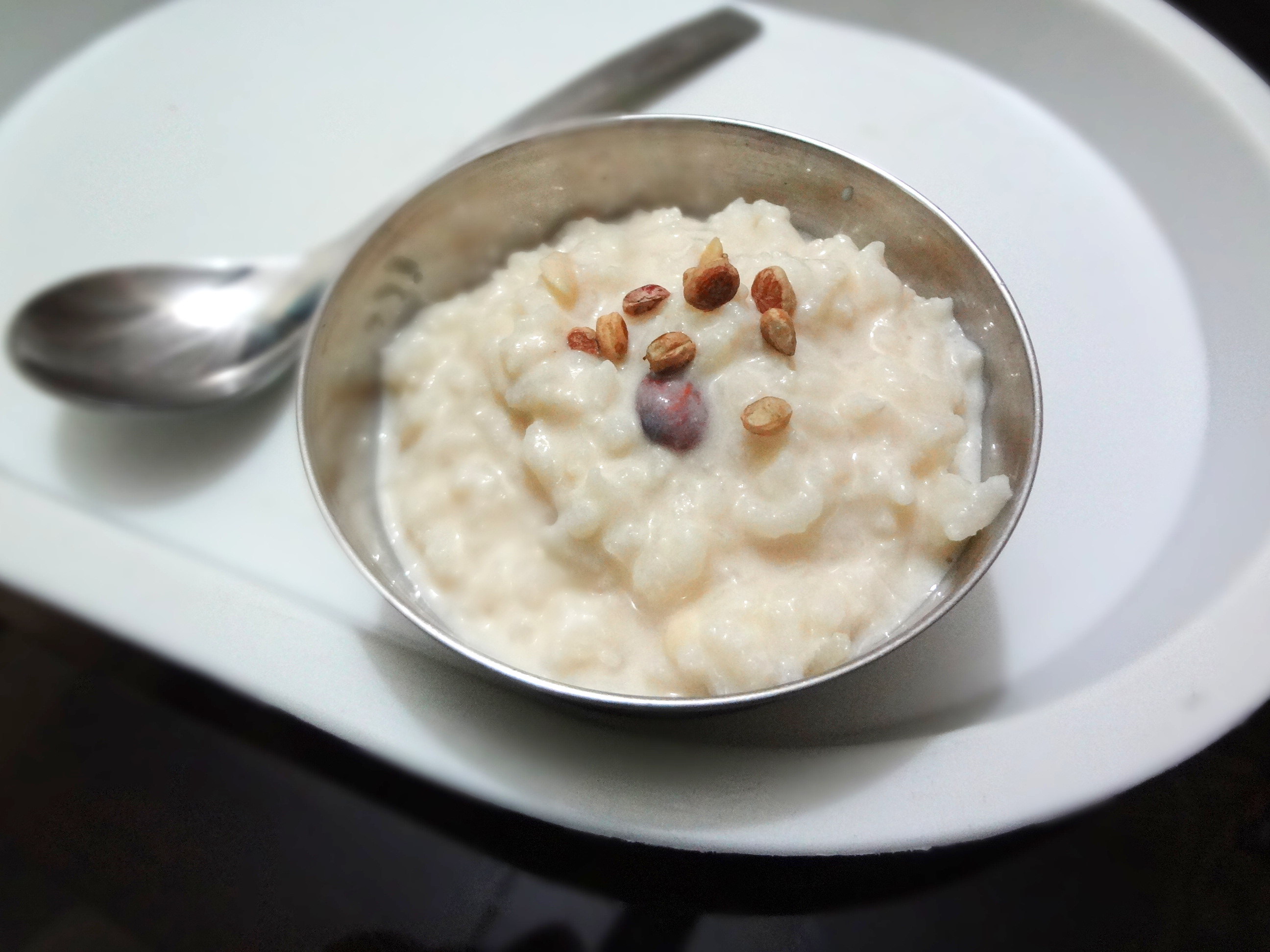
- Kheer or paysam, an Indian rice pudding
- Alternative names: Creamed rice, sütlaç, sholezard, riz au lait, arroz-doce, kheer, arroz con leche, Milchreis
- Type: Milk
- Place of origin: Worldwide
- Serving temperature: Any temperature
- Main ingredients: Rice, water or milk

Rice pudding is a dish made from rice and milk, and commonly other ingredients such as sweeteners, spices, flavourings and sometimes eggs.

Variants are used for either desserts or dinners. When used as a dessert, it is commonly combined with a sweetener such as sugar. Such desserts are found on many continents, especially Asia, where rice is a staple. Some variants are thickened only with the rice starch, while others include eggs, making them a kind of custard.

== Rice pudding around the world ==
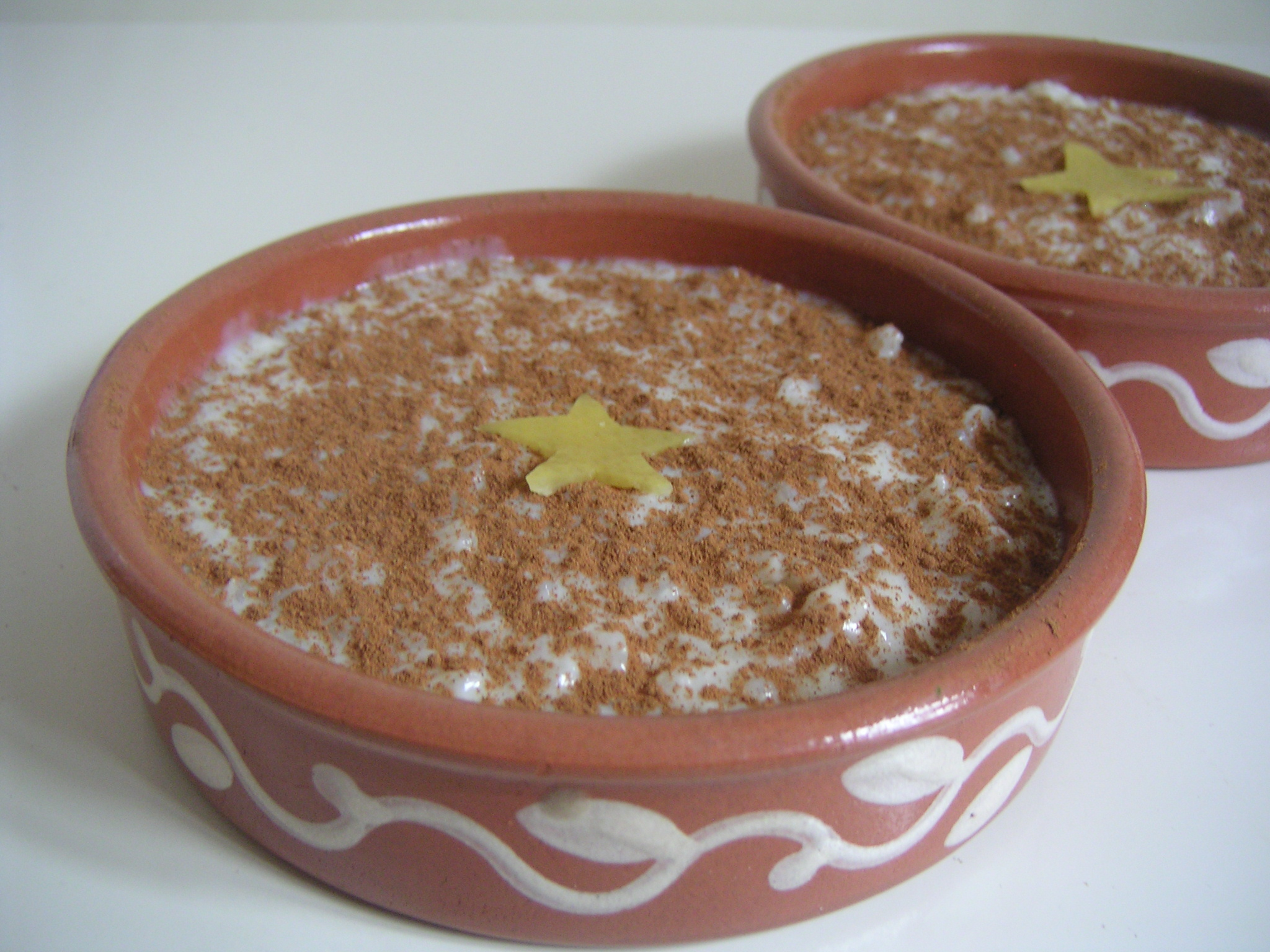
Arroz con leche (rice with milk) is the Spanish and American type of rice pudding. Leftover rice is often used, especially in restaurants.

Rice puddings are found in nearly every area of the world. Recipes can greatly vary even within a single country. The dessert can be boiled or baked. Different types of pudding vary depending on preparation methods and the selected ingredients. The following ingredients are usually found in rice puddings:

- rice; white rice (usually short-grain, but can also be long-grain, broken rice, basmati, or jasmine rice), brown rice, or black rice
- milk (whole milk, plant milk, cream, or evaporated)
- spices (cardamom, nutmeg, cinnamon, ginger, or others)
- flavorings and toppings (vanilla, orange, lemon, rose water; pistachio, almond, cashew, raisin, walnut, or others)
- sweetener (sugar, brown sugar, honey, sweetened condensed milk, dates, fruit or syrups)
- eggs (sometimes)

The following is a list of various rice puddings grouped by place of origin.

=== West Asia/North Africa ===
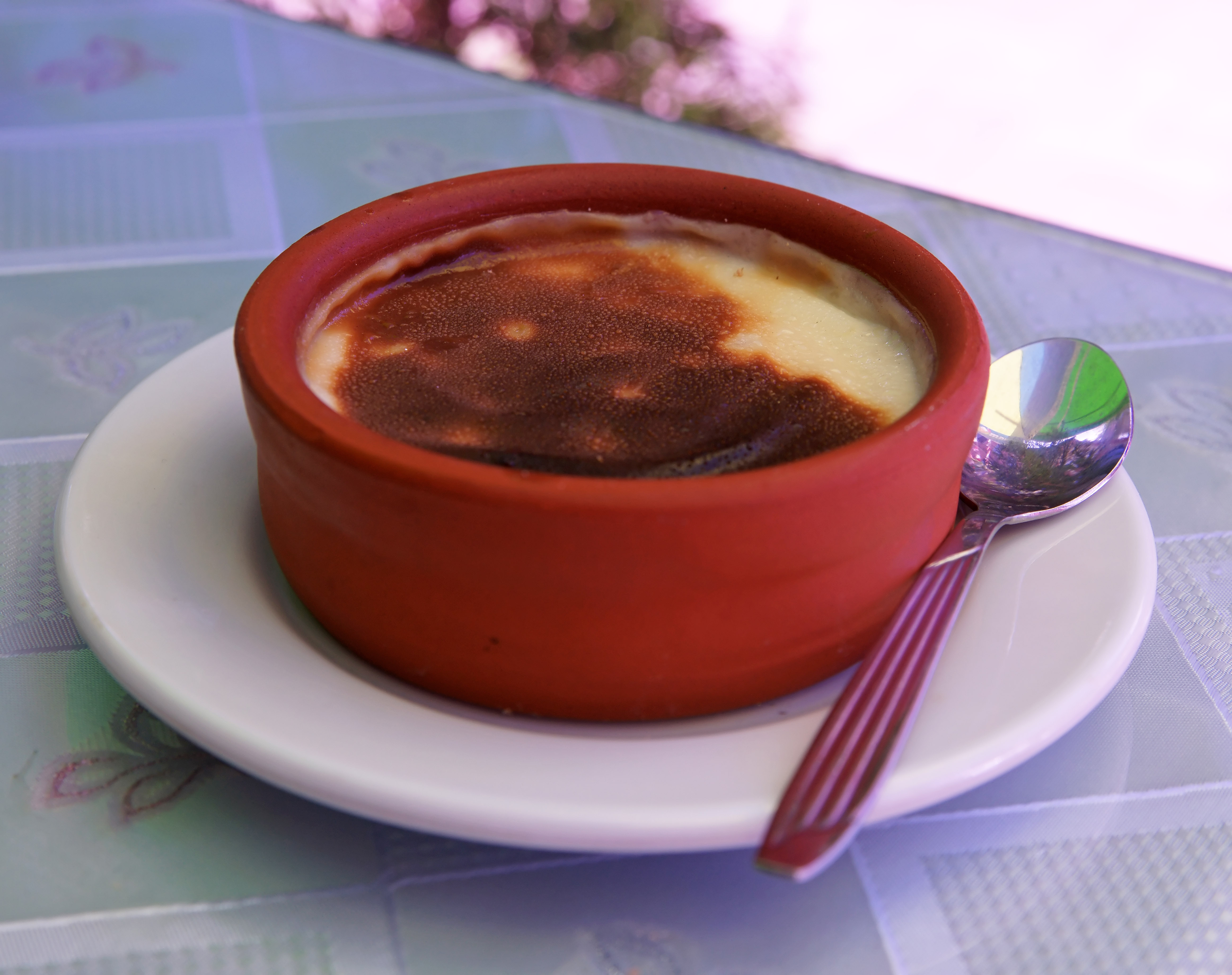
Turkish fırın sütlaç, baked

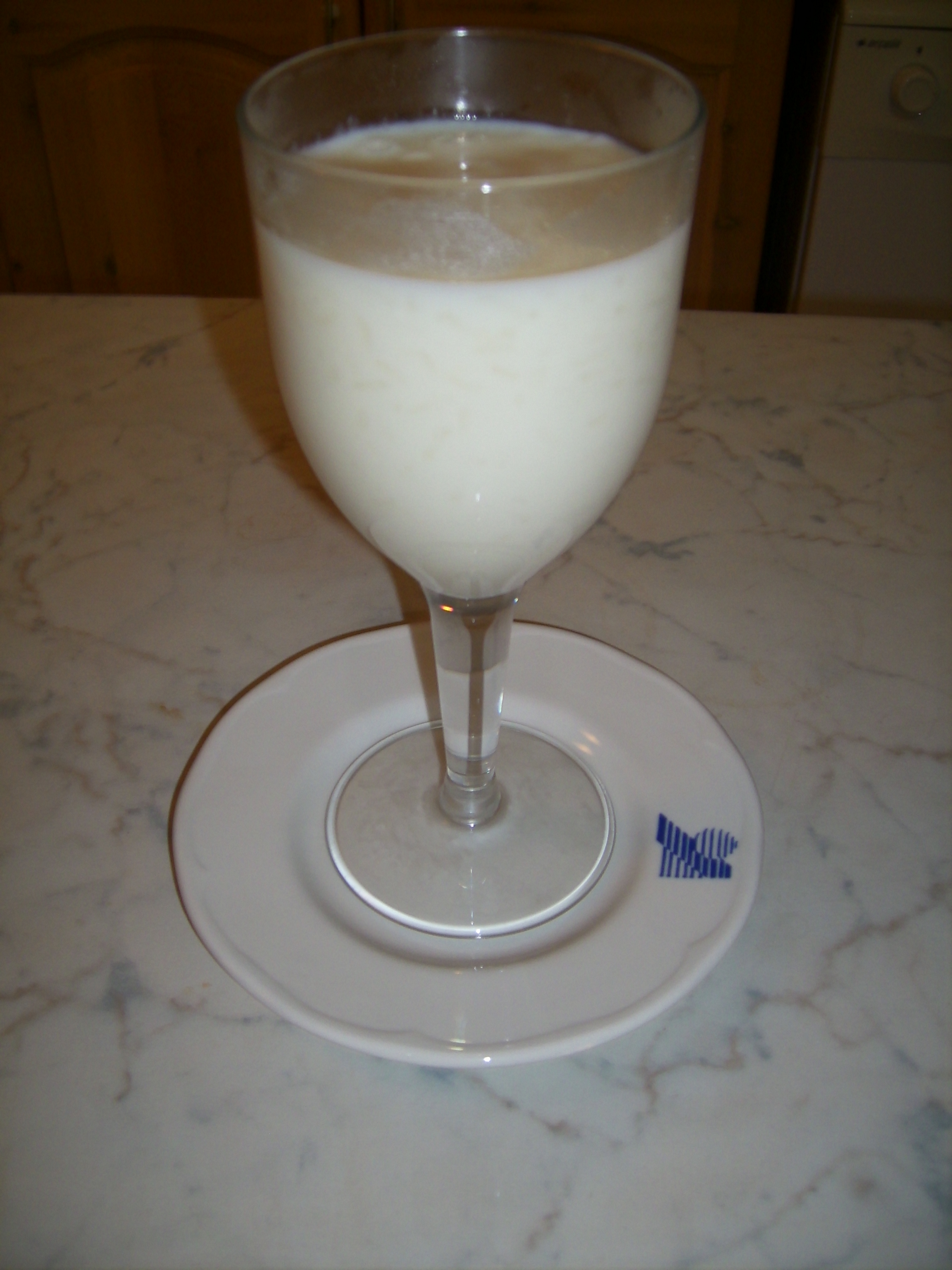
Lebanese riz bi haleeb

- Levant: rice with milk (رز بحليب) with anise, caraway, and cinnamon
- Egypt: Rozz bi-laban (رز بلبن transliterated rozz be laban, meaning "rice with milk") is a traditional Egyptian dessert made from rice flour, milk, sugar, and vanilla. It is often enriched with toppings such as cinnamon, raisins, coconut, nuts for added flavor and texture.
- Tunisia: Mhalbiya (محلبية تونسية) made with rice, milk, sugar, rose water or orange blossom water and nuts
- Riz au lait (DRC-French) with milk and sugar
- Fırın sütlaç (Turkish) baked, with milk, eggs, and cinnamon
- Sütlaç (Turkish), served cold; often browned in a salamander broiler and garnished with cinnamon. May be sweetened with sugar or pekmez. The name comes from sütlü aş (lit. 'dish with milk'). It is also consumed by Sephardic Jews, traditionally during the Jewish holiday of Shavuot.
- Sholezard (Iranian) made with saffron and rose water. Some variations use butter to improve the texture. It is especially served on Islamic occasions in the months of Muharram and Ramadan.
- Shir berenj (Iranian, شیر برنج) made with cardamom
- Zarda wa haleeb (Iraqi) rice prepared with date syrup served in the same dish as with rice prepared with milk
- Gatnabour (Armenian, Կաթնապուր), (lit. 'milk pudding')
- Südlü aş (Azerbaijani), (lit. 'rice dish with milk')

=== Central and South Asia ===
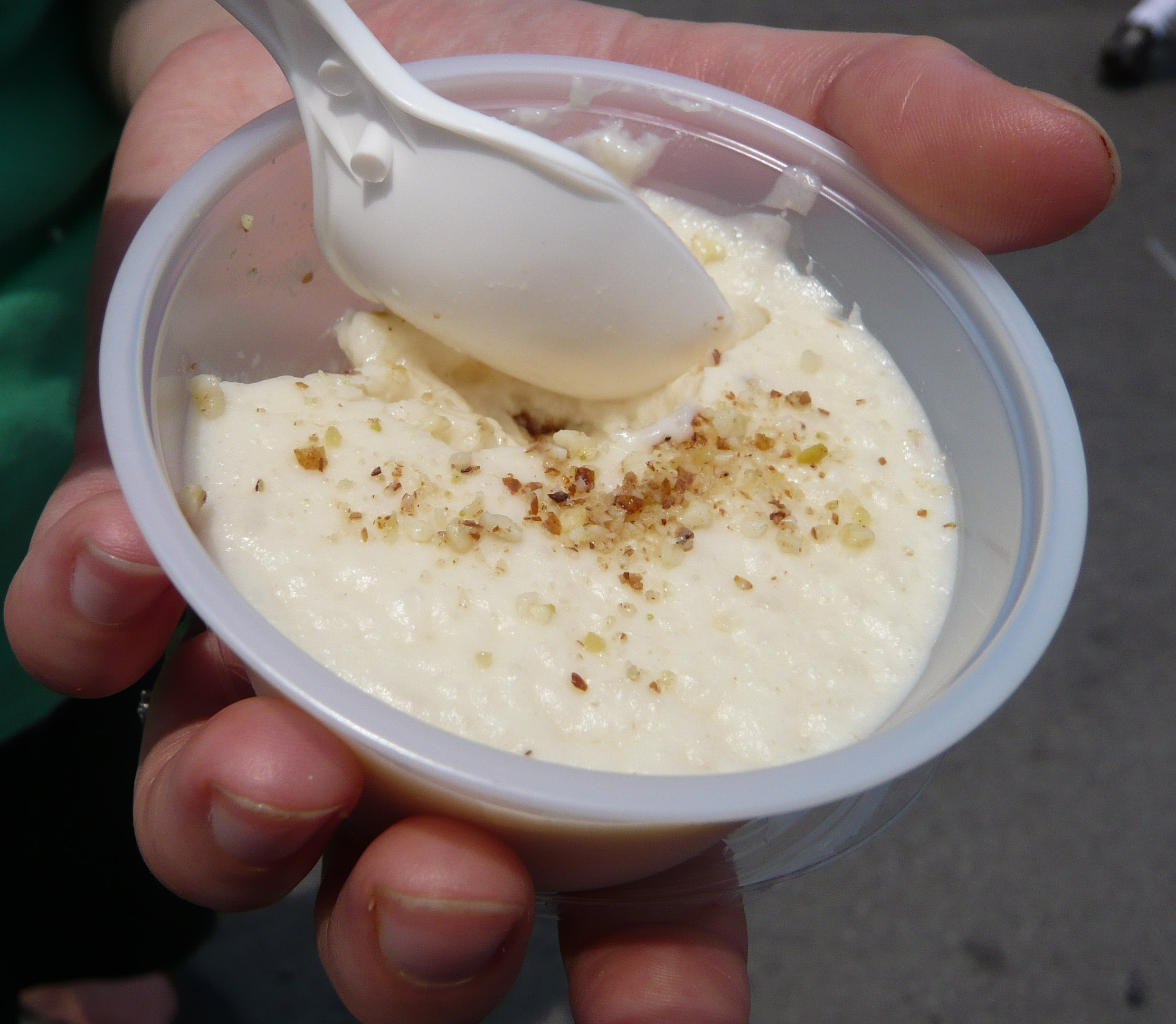
Indian kheer in a restaurant

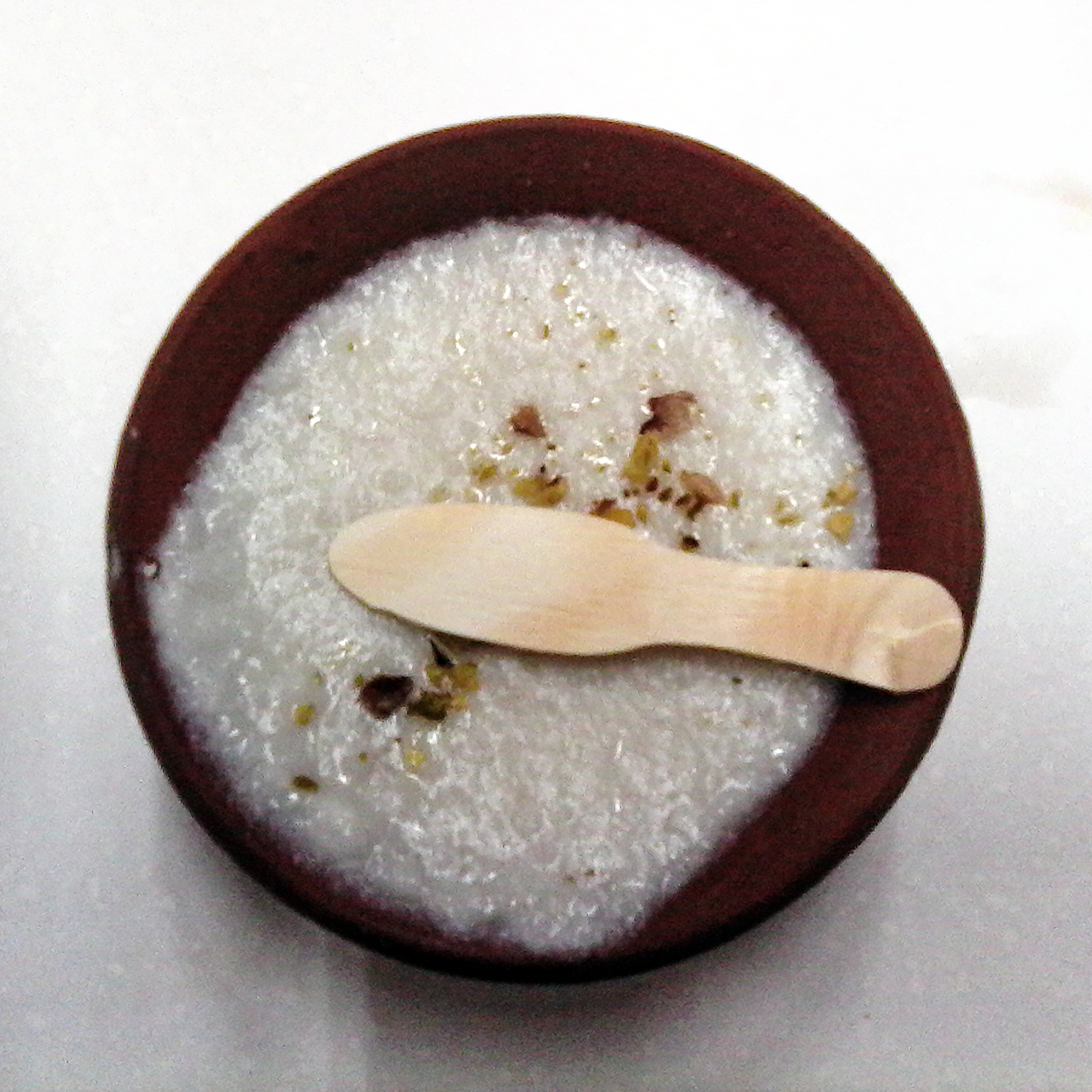
Kheer benazir at the Old Delhi restaurant Karim's

- Dudhapak (Indian [Gujarati]) with slow-boiled milk, sugar, basmati rice, nuts, and saffron
- Firni (South-Central Asian) with broken rice, cardamom and pistachio, reduced to a paste, and served cold
- Kheer (Indian Subcontinent) with slow-boiled milk
- Payasam (South Indian) with slow-boiled milk, sugar/ jaggery, and nuts. A special mention must be made about the Paal Payasam made in Kerala where the payasam is simmered for hours in a heavy-bottomed metal pot, producing a naturally thick, rich texture giving it a distinctive pastel pink shade
- Paayesh (Bengali) with grounded basmati or parboiled rice, milk, sugar or jaggery, cardamom and pistachio; can be served either hot or cold
- Pongal, a sweet rice pudding made with brown rice, traditionally found in both South Indian cuisine and Sri Lankan cuisine and eaten for New Year's Day festivities.
- Kiribath, a traditional dish made from coconut milk and rice in Sri Lankan cuisine.

=== East Asia ===
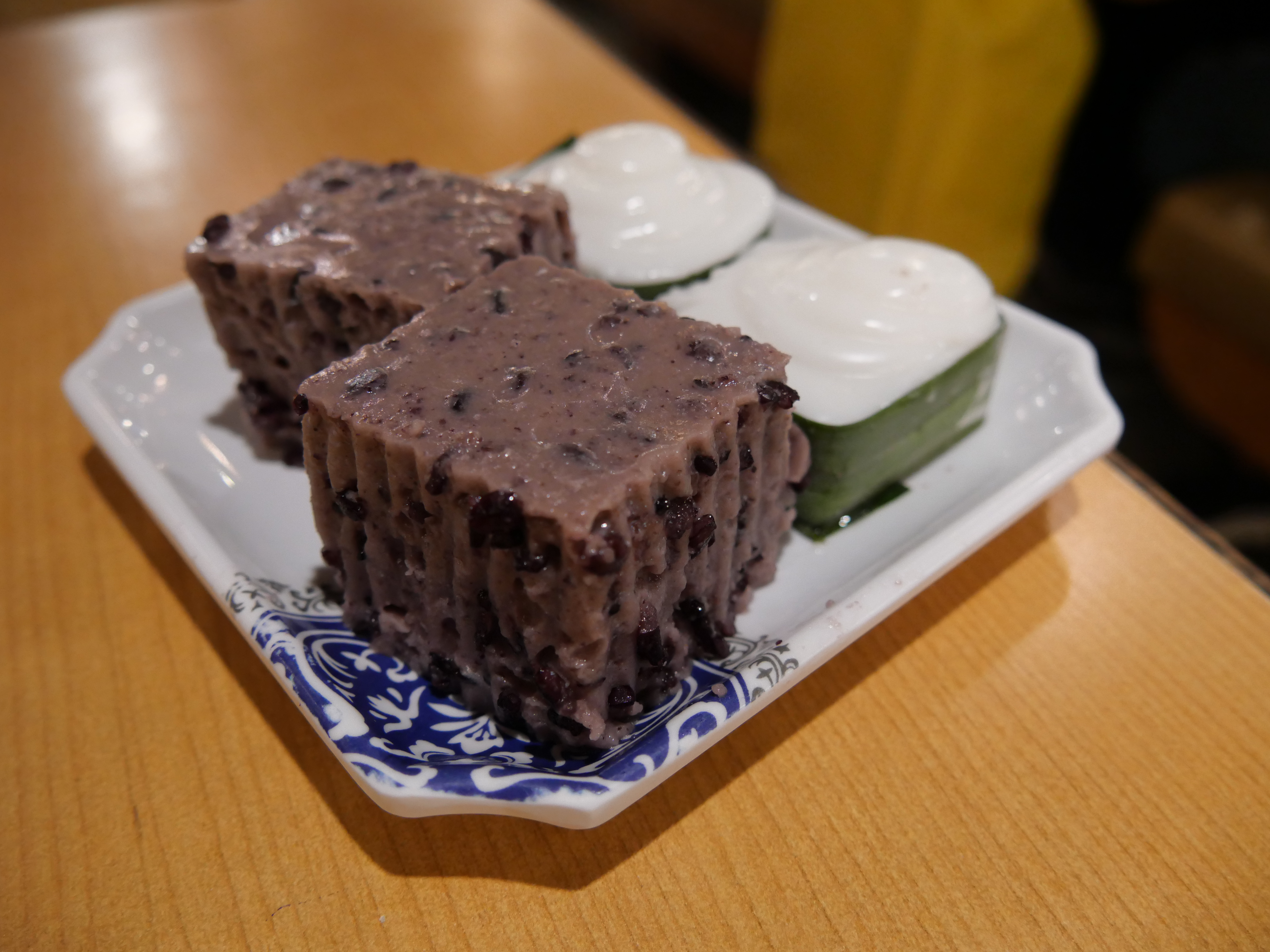
Chinese black rice pudding

- Ba bao fan (Chinese) with glutinous rice, red bean paste, lard, sugar syrup, and eight kinds of fruits or nuts; traditionally eaten at the Chinese New Year
- Put chai ko (Hong Kong) made with white or brown sugar, long-grain rice flour, red beans, and a little cornstarch. It can be commonly found as street food and has a gelatinous consistency.
- Tarak-juk (Korea): juk (rice porridge) made with milk.

=== Southeast Asia ===
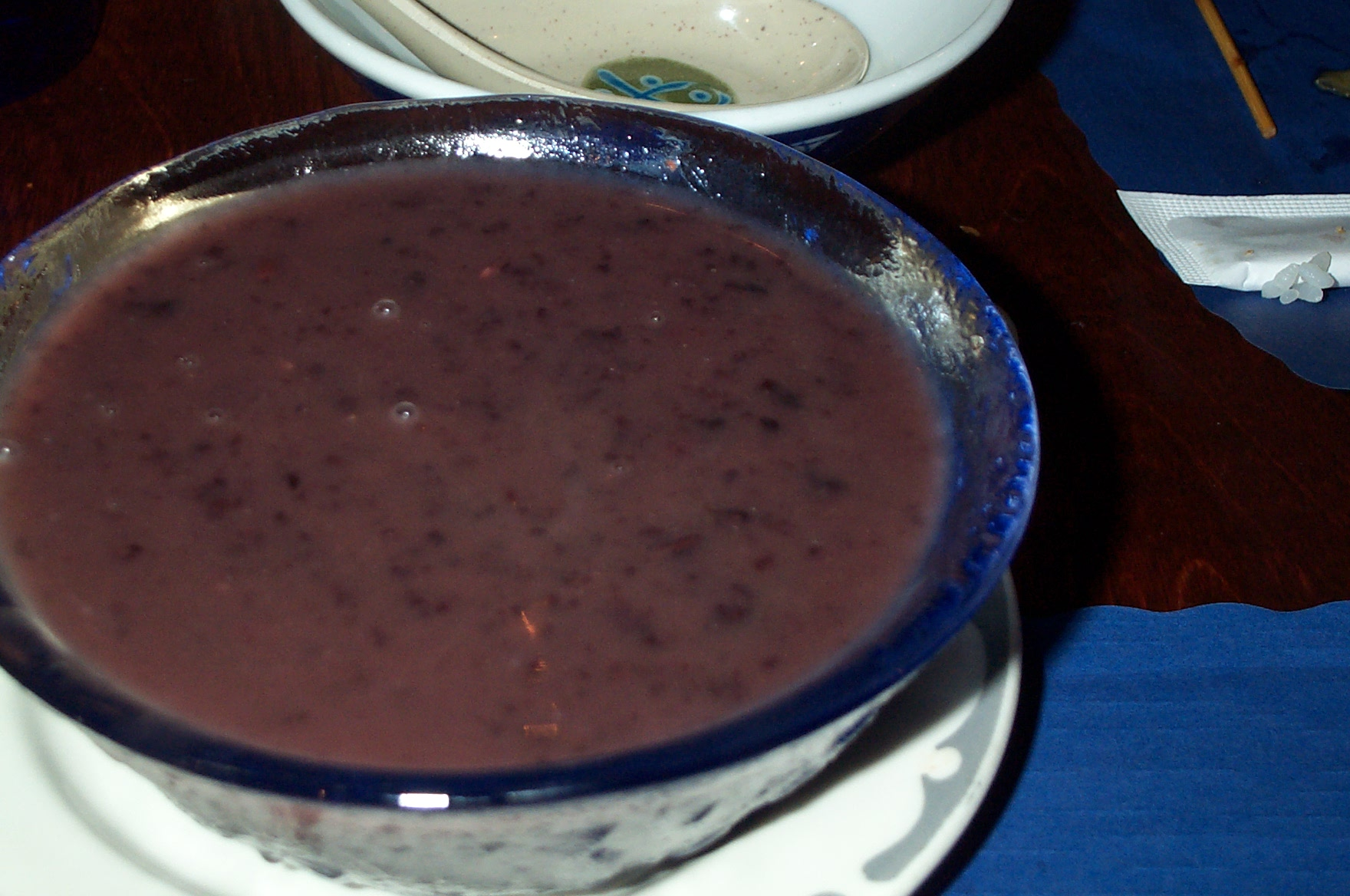
Malaysian pulut hitam in a restaurant

Many dishes resembling rice pudding can be found in Southeast Asia, many of which have Chinese influences. Owing to Chinese usage, they are almost never referred to as rice pudding by the local populations (whether ethnic Chinese origin or not) but instead called sweet rice porridge.

- Banana rice pudding (Thailand)
- Bubur ketan hitam (Indonesia), black glutinous rice porridge
- Bubur sumsum (Indonesia)
- Chè (Vietnam), Vietnamese dessert porridges and puddings, many of which utilize glutinous rice
- Khanom sot sai (Thailand, ขนมสอดไส้)
- Maja blanca (Philippines), milk-and-rice pudding
- Pulut hitam (Malaysia/Singapore), similar to ketan hitam, its Indonesian counterpart
- Tibuktíbuk (Philippines), Pampangan milk-and-rice pudding
- Tsamporado (Philippines), chocolate rice pudding

=== Oceania ===
Koko alaisa (lit. "cocoa rice") is a type of pudding unique to Samoa flavoured with chocolate, usually processed at home.

=== Europe ===
==== Britain and Ireland ====
In the United Kingdom and Ireland, rice pudding is a traditional dessert typically made with high-starch short-grained rice sold as "pudding rice".

The earliest rice pudding recipes were called whitepot and date from the Tudor period. Rice pudding is traditionally made with pudding rice, milk, cream and sugar and is sometimes flavoured with vanilla, nutmeg, currants, raisins, jam or cinnamon. It can be made in two ways: in a saucepan or by baking in the oven.

It can be made by gently simmering the milk and rice in a saucepan until tender, and then the sugar is carefully mixed in. Finally, the cream is mixed in, and it can either be left to cool and served at room temperature, or heated and served hot. It should have a very creamy consistency.

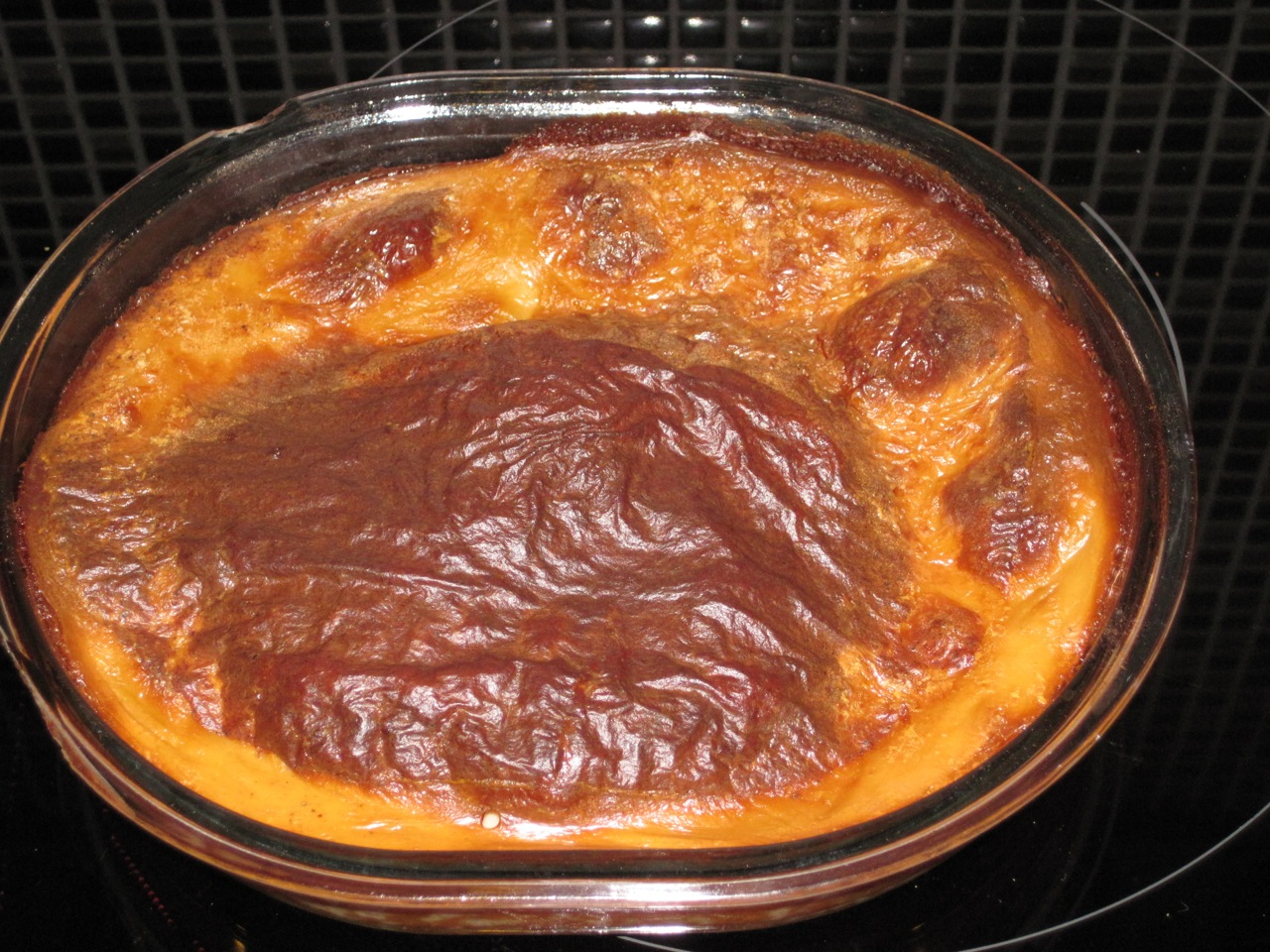
Oven-baked

When made in the oven, the pudding rice is placed into a baking dish, and the milk, cream and sugar are mixed in. The dish is then placed in the oven and baked at a low temperature for a few hours, until the rice is tender and the pudding has a creamy consistency. While cooking, the pudding may develop a thick crust, which adds a distinct texture. It is traditional to sprinkle the top with finely grated nutmeg before baking. Using evaporated milk (9% milk fat) instead of whole milk enriches the result and intensifies the caramelised flavour.

An alternative recipe frequently used in the north of England uses butter instead of cream, adds a small pinch of salt, and requires the pudding mixture to stand for an hour or so prior to being cooked. Such puddings tend to set firmly when cooled, enabling slices to be cut and eaten like cake. If eaten hot, the pudding is traditionally served with cream poured on top in wealthy households, and with full-fat milk where cream was not available. A spoonful of sweet jam or conserve is a frequently added topping for the pudding. Clotted cream is often used in the West Country.

A specific type of rice is available and widely used for rice pudding, called pudding rice. Similar to Arborio rice, its grain is round and short, and when cooked produces a creamier consistency than savoury rice. However, other short-grained rice can be used as a substitute.

Ready-made, pre-cooked rice pudding is widely available in supermarkets and corner shops, either chilled in pots or ambient in tin cans, which has a long shelf life. A popular brand is Ambrosia. Some brands are made with skimmed (fat free) milk.

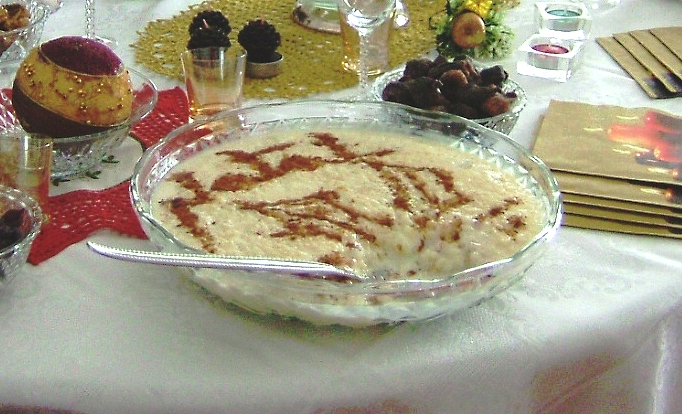
Portuguese arroz doce served for Christmas

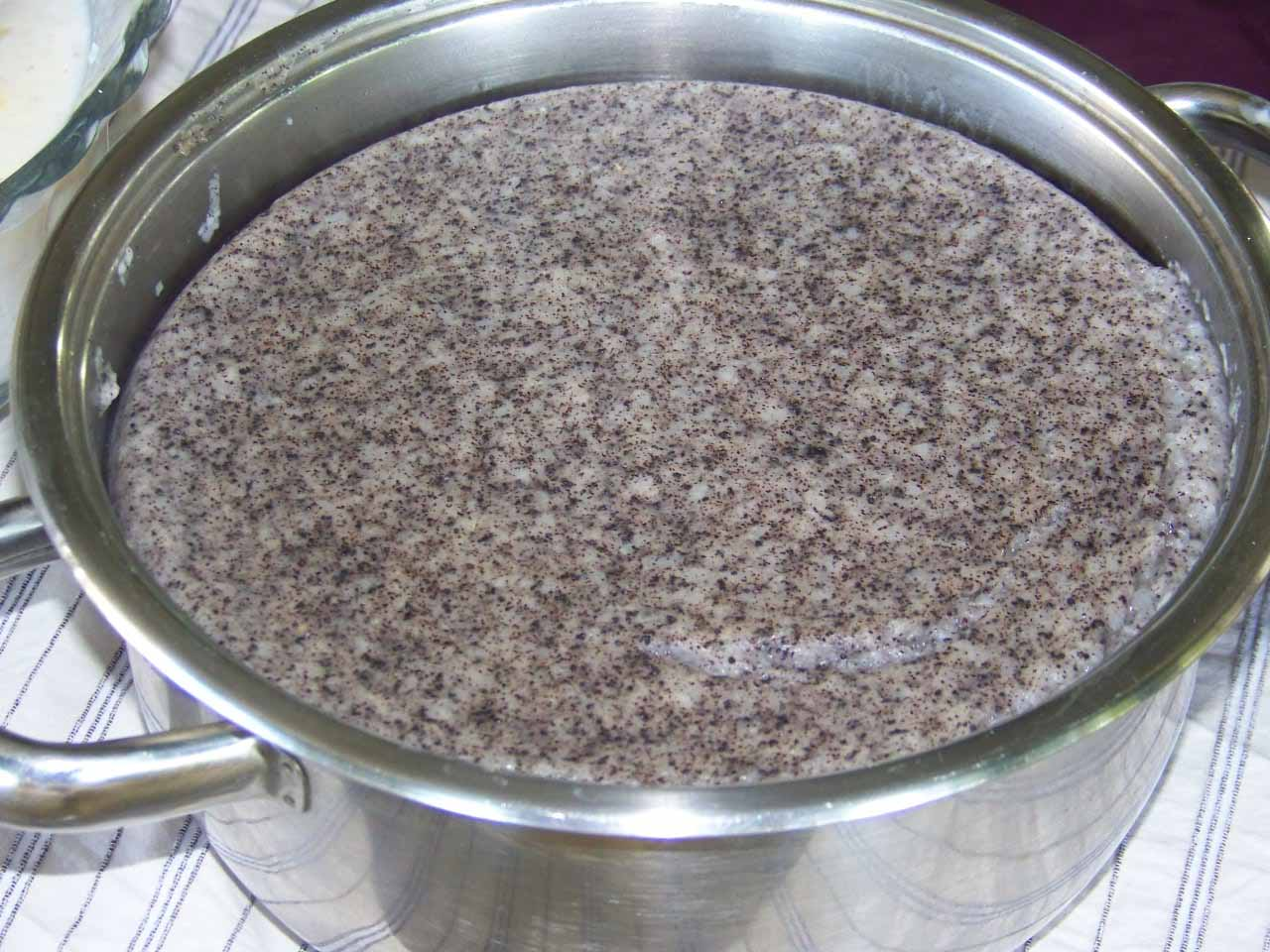
Armenian lapa with black poppy seeds

==== European dishes similar to rice pudding ====
- Arroz con leche (Spanish) with milk, sugar, cinnamon, lemon zest (whole or grated), sometimes eggs
- Arroz doce (Portuguese) with sugar, milk, egg yolks, cinnamon sticks and ground cinnamon, lemon peel, vanilla and a pinch of nutmeg can be added. The consistency should be thick, soft and held together. It is traditional to create a decorative pattern with ground cinnamon using only the fingertips.
- Arroz-esne (Basque) with sugar and milk; sometimes with cinnamon
- Budino di riso (Italian) with milk, eggs, raisins and orange peel
- Grjónagrautur (Icelandic), everyday meal, served with cinnamon, sugar, raisins and lifrarpylsa 'liver sausage'.
- Milchreis (German) with rice, milk, sugar, cinnamon, and different fruit compotes, like cherry compote, or applesauce.
- Mlečni riž or Rižev puding (Slovene)
- Mliečna ryža (Slovak)
- Молочна рисова каша / molochna risova kasha (Ukrainian), also can appear as кутя (kutia) for Christmas (served with dried fruits and nuts)
- Orez cu lapte (Romanian) with milk and cinnamon
- Riisipuuro (Finnish), served at Christmas time, often with cinnamon and sugar or prune kissel; additionally used as a filling for the traditional Karelian pasty
- Rijstebrij (Dutch) or Rijstpap (Flemish)
- Risengrød (Danish), served with butter, sugar and cinnamon or dark fruit juice at the Christmas table and for dinner during the winter months
- Risengrynsgrøt/risgrøt/riskrem (Norwegian), served with butter, sugar and cinnamon and especially popular at Christmas, usually eaten on 23 December in a celebration called Lillejulaften 'Little Christmas Eve'
- Risgrynsgröt (Swedish), served with sugar and cinnamon and milk or fruit juice sauce, at the Christmas table and for breakfast and dinner during the winter months, especially during Christmas time
- Riža na mlijeku (Croatian)
- Riso al latte (Italian)
- Riz au lait or the moulded riz à l'impératrice (French)
- Ρυζόγαλο/rizogalo (Greek) stovetop or baked rice pudding, with milk, sugar, vanilla and cinnamon.
- Ryż na mleku (Polish)
- Sutlijaš (Bosnian)
- Sylt(i)jash / qumësht me oriz (Albanian)
- Сутлијач / Благ ориз (sutliyach, blag oriz) (Macedonian), also Лапа (lapa, Audio) with black poppy seeds
- Сутлијаш / sutlijaš (Serbian)
- Мляко с ориз / mliako s oriz, or Сутляш in certain regions (Bulgarian) with milk and cinnamon
- Tameloriz (Kosovan Albanian)
- Tejberizs and rizsfelfújt (Hungarian) often with raisins or golden raisins, cinnamon or cocoa powder, sometimes with almonds or walnuts; for dessert or breakfast
- Teurgoule (Normandy)
- Рисовая каша / risovaya kasha (Russian), usually eaten for breakfast, sweetened with sugar and served with a knob of butter

==== Nordic countries ====
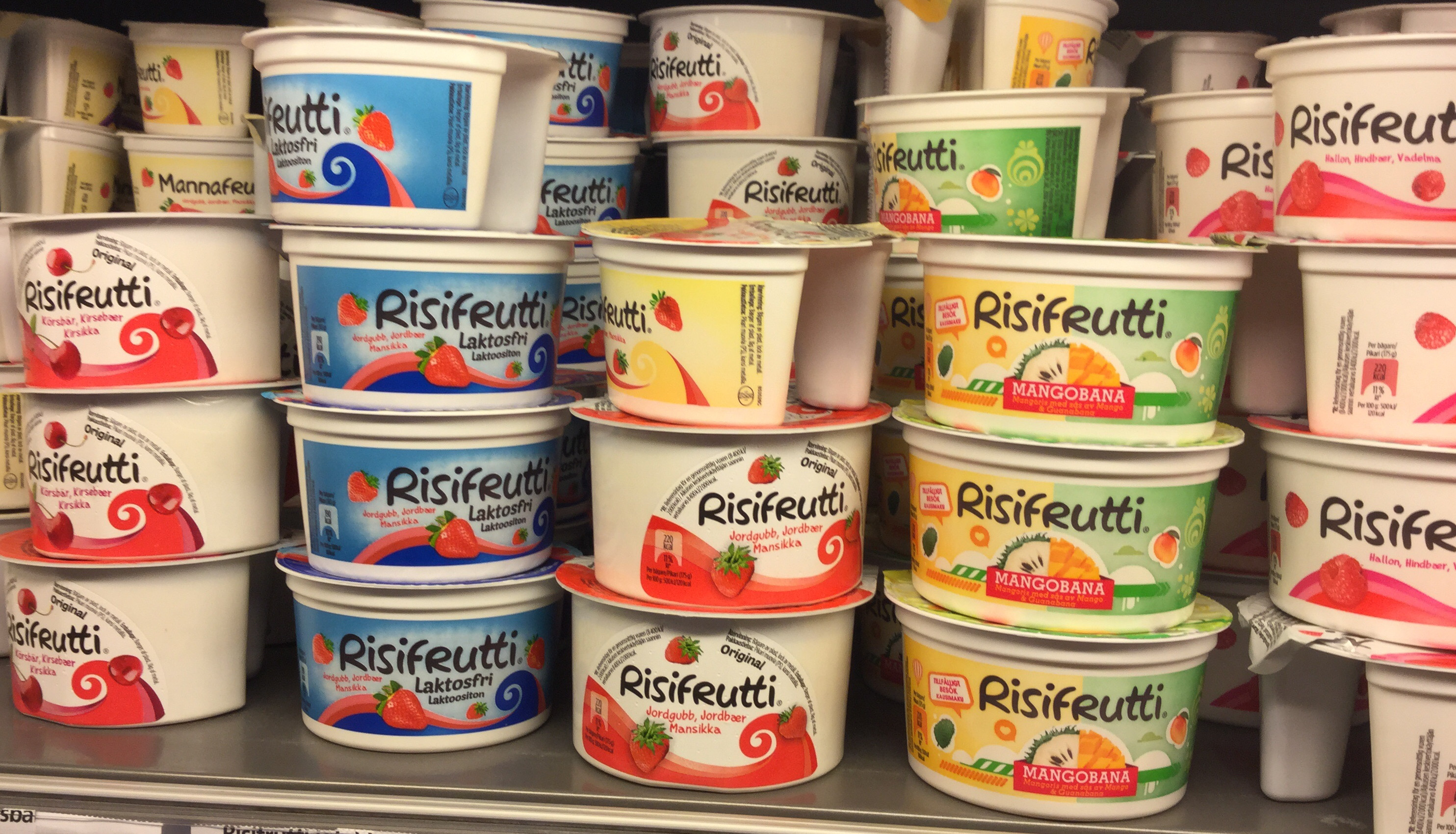
Store-bought rice pudding

In the Nordic countries, rice porridge is commonly eaten for breakfast, dinner and sometimes lunch. It is made as a warm dish from rice cooked in milk. When served, it is commonly sprinkled with cinnamon, sugar (or syrup) and a small knob of butter, and served with milk or fruit juice. In Iceland, it is sometimes served with cold slátur, a type of liver sausage. In different languages it is called risengrød (Danish), risengrynsgrøt or risgrøt/risgraut (Norwegian), risgrynsgröt (Swedish), riisipuuro (Finnish), grjónagrautur [ˈkrjouːnaˌkrœyːtʏr̥], hrísgrautur [ˈr̥iːs-] or hrísgrjónagrautur (Icelandic), and rísgreytur (Faroese).

The rice porridge dinner is used as a basis for rice cream dessert. There are many different variants of this dessert but the basis is the same: cold rice porridge (the dinner variant) is mixed with whipped cream and sweetened. In Sweden, it is sometimes mixed with oranges and is then called apelsinris. Risalamande (Danish, after French riz à l'amande, rice with almonds) is cold risengrød with whipped cream, vanilla, and chopped almond, often served with hot or chilled cherry (or strawberry) sauce. In Norway, the dessert is called riskrem and served with red sauce (usually made from strawberries, raspberries or cherries). Rice cream dessert is called ris à la Malta in Sweden, while what is referred to as risgrynspudding is made with eggs instead of cream.

In Scandinavia, rice pudding has long been a part of Christmas tradition, in some countries referred to as julegröt/julegrøt/julegrød/joulupuuro (Yule porridge) or tomtegröt/nissegrød. The latter name is due to the old tradition of sharing the meal with the guardian of the homestead, called tomte or nisse (see also blót). In Finland, Christmas rice porridge is sometimes eaten with a kissel or compote made of dried prunes.

A particular Christmas tradition often associated with rice pudding or porridge is hiding a whole almond in the porridge. In Sweden and Finland, popular belief has it that the one who eats the almond will be in luck the following year. In Norway, Denmark, Iceland and the Faroe Islands, the one who finds it will get the almond present as a prize. In Denmark and the Faroe Islands, the almond tradition is usually done with risalamande served as dessert at julefrokost (Christmas lunch) or on Christmas Eve. In Norway, it is commonly served as lunch or early dinner on Christmas Eve or the day before, lillejulaften 'Little Christmas Eve'. In Sweden and Finland, it is more commonly done with a rice porridge dinner, sometimes a few days before Christmas Eve.

=== Canada and the United States ===
In Canada and the United States, most recipes come from European immigrants. In the latter half of the 20th century, South Asian, Middle Eastern and Latin American recipes have also become more common. In New England, a popular pudding is made with long grain rice, milk, sugar, or in Vermont, maple syrup. This may be combined with nutmeg, cinnamon or raisins. The pudding is usually partially cooked on top of the stove in a double boiler, and then finished in an oven.

=== Latin America and the Caribbean ===
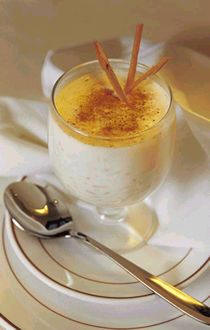
Argentine arroz con leche

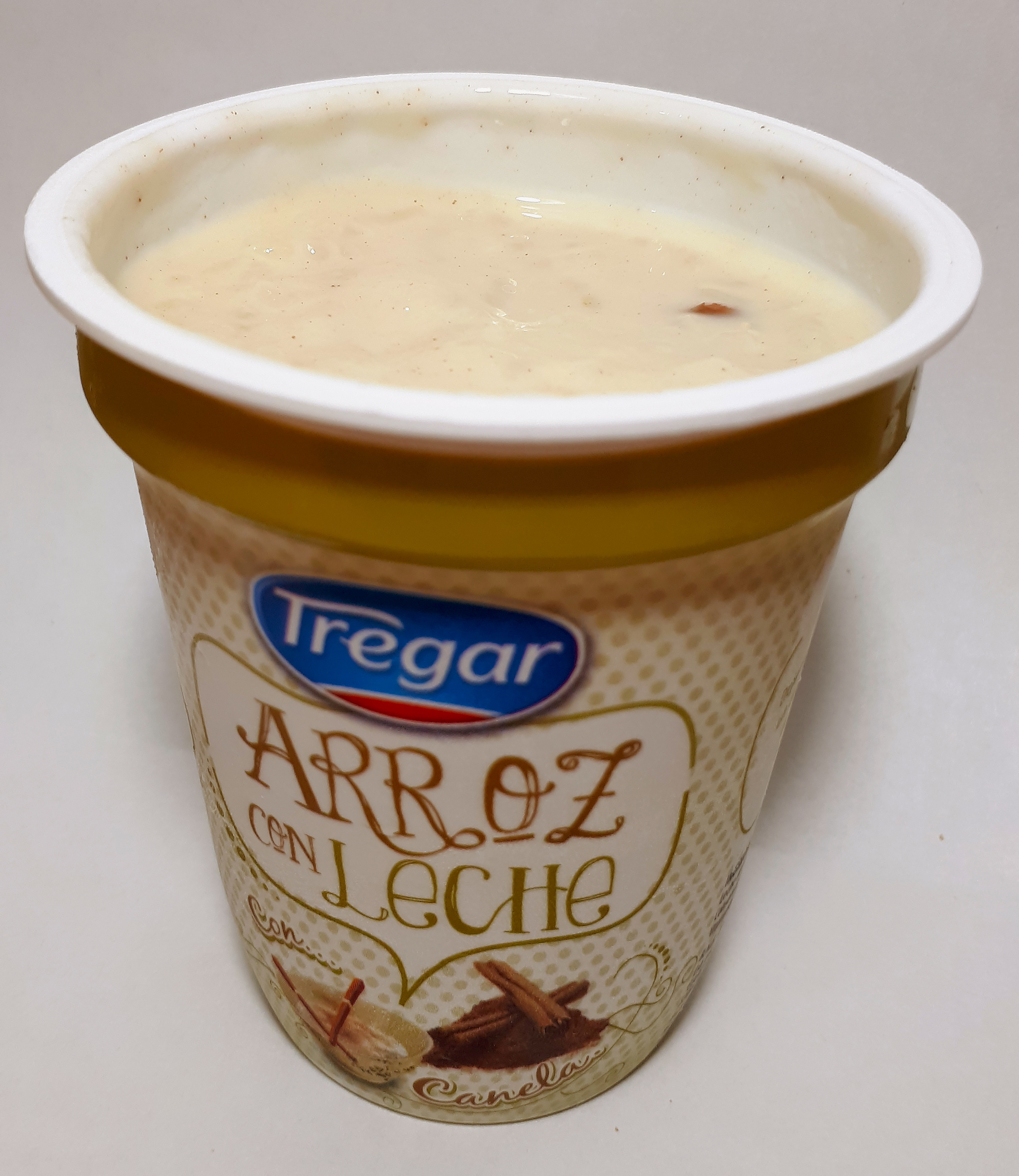
Industrial arroz con leche with cinnamon sold in Argentina by Tregar

- Arroz con dulce (Puerto Rico) rice pudding in Puerto Rico is typically made with milk, butter, raisins, rum, short grain rice, coconut cream, sugar and a variety of spices. The spices usually include ginger, clove, star anise, nutmeg, cinnamon, and vanilla.
- Arroz con leche (Dominican Republic) made with milk, cinnamon, raisins, sugar, and nutmeg. Other spices are also often used such as clove, vanilla, star anise and lemon zest.
- Arroz con leche made to Spanish recipes; popular flavourings include anise seed, star anise, and raisins (Nicaragua, El Salvador, Costa Rica), cinnamon, or cajeta or dulce de leche (Bolivia, Paraguay, Chile, Uruguay, Venezuela, Cuba, Panama) or dulce de leche with cinnamon (Argentina). Arroz con leche was brought to Argentina by Spanish colonists, and has been popular and developed many variants since then. It may be served cold or hot, and in addition to the standard dulce de leche and/or cinnamon, it can be served with almonds, fruit, lemon zest, chocolate or cocoa, cream, or even plain with no additional flavors.
- Arroz con leche (Mexican) with milk, cinnamon, sugar, egg yolk, vanilla, orange peel, raisins (soaked in sherry, rum or tequila); chocolate, butter, nutmeg, or lime zest may also be added.
- Arroz con leche (Guatemala) with milk, cinnamon, sugar, and vanilla; raisins may also be added.
- Rice pudding (Jamaican) with milk, egg yolk, allspice, sugar, raisins (soaked in rum), vanilla, butter, sometimes crushed meringue, toasted coconut flakes, cornstarch, and crushed pineapple can be added.
- Arroz con leche (Colombian) with milk, cream, sugar, coffee, raisins (soaked in rum or red wine), butter, vanilla, cinnamon, and cloves.
- Arroz con leche (Peruvian) with milk, sugar, orange peel, raisins, cloves, sweetened condensed milk, cinnamon, and vanilla and sometimes shredded coconut and (more rarely) brazil nuts can be added. It is commonly consumed with mazamorra morada (purple corn pudding). When served with mazamorra morada, it is known as clasico. A variant known as arroz zambito is made by adding chancaca.
- Morocho (Ecuador)
- Sweet rice (Trinidadian and Guyanese) with coconut milk, nutmeg, cinnamon, raisins, vanilla, and angostura bitter.
- Arroz-doce or arroz de leite (Brazilian) with milk or occasionally coconut milk, sugar, condensed milk and cinnamon.
- Arroz con leche (Venezuela) with milk, coconut, sugar, condensed milk and cinnamon.
- Du riz au lait (Haiti) made with milk, condensed milk, cinnamon, vanilla, sugar, and raisins.

== See also ==
- Amazake
- Congee
- Hasty pudding
- List of savoury puddings
- List of sweet puddings
- Sago pudding
- Semolina pudding
- Sombi
- Tapioca pudding
