= Chancaca =

Sugar sauce in Andean cuisine

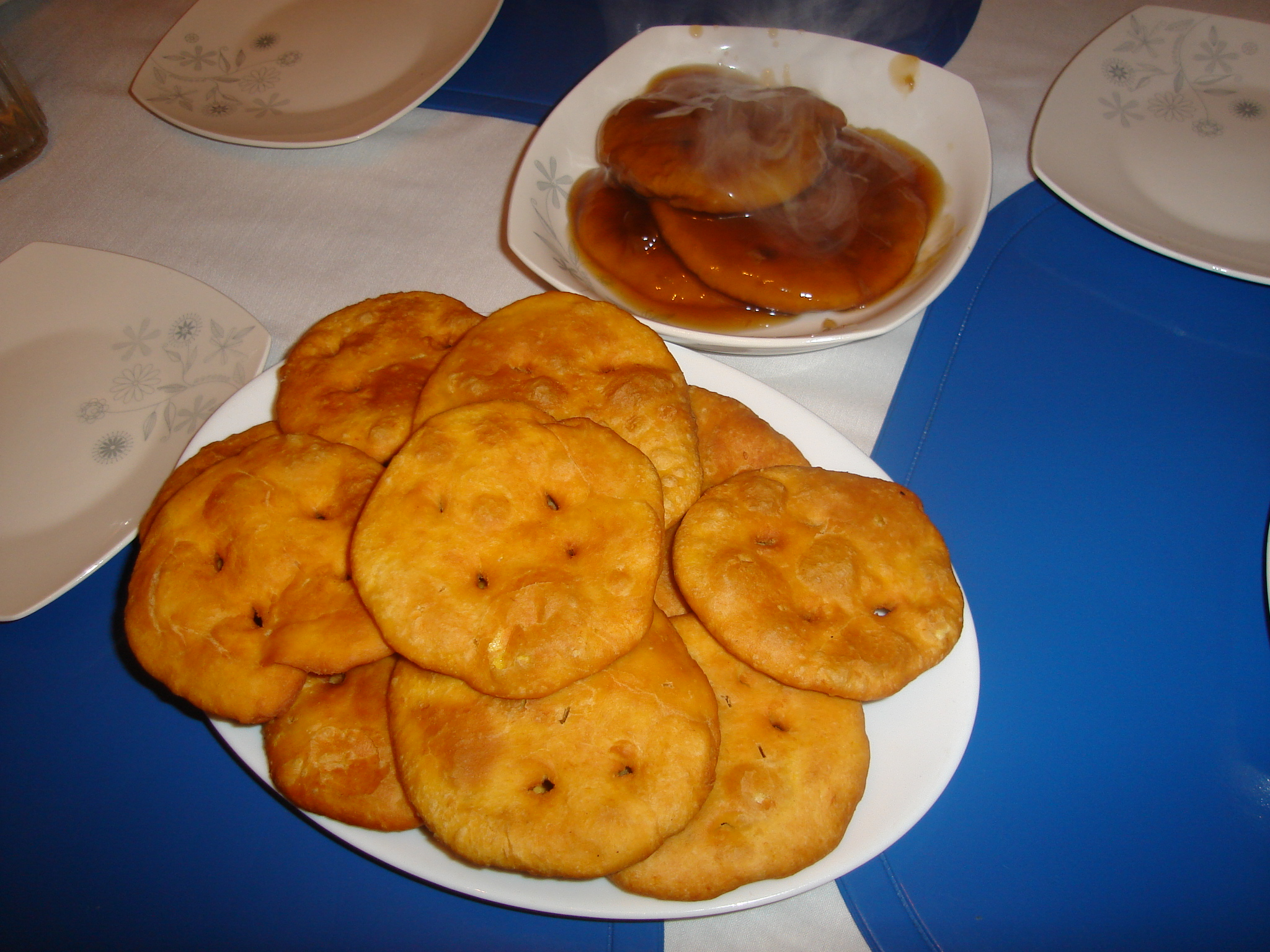
- Sopaipillas with and without chancaca sauce
- Type: Dessert topping
- Place of origin: Bolivia, Chile, and Peru
- Main ingredients: Sugar, honey; usually zest of orange

Chancaca is a typical Bolivian, Chilean and Peruvian, warm, sweet sauce made of raw unrefined sugar from sugarcane. It is often flavored with orange peel and cinnamon, and is consumed on sopaipillas or picarones.

Chancaca is also a synonym for panela, the unrefined sugar used to make chancaca syrup. Chancaca can be used to prepare chicha de jora, Peruvian maize beer.

In Colombia, chancacas are a traditional coconut candy.

== See also ==
- List of dessert sauces
