= Picarones =

Peruvian dessert

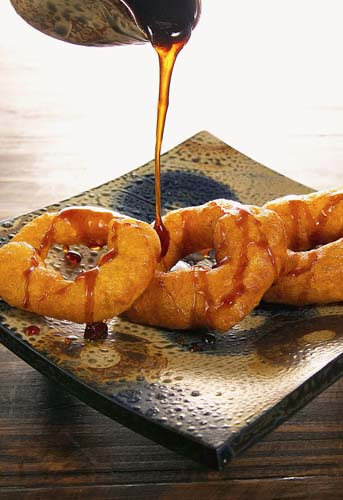
- Chancaca being poured over some picarones.
- Type: Doughnut
- Place of origin: Peru
- Main ingredients: Squash, sweet potatoes, chancaca syrup

Picarones (or picarón singular) is a Peruvian dessert that originated in Lima during the viceroyalty. It is somewhat similar to buñuelos, a type of doughnut brought to the colonies by Spanish conquistadors. Its principal ingredients are squash and sweet potato. It is served in a doughnut form and covered with syrup, made from chancaca (solidified molasses). It is traditional to serve picarones when people prepare anticuchos, another traditional Peruvian dish.

== History ==
Picarones were created during the colonial period to replace buñuelos as buñuelos were too expensive to make. People started replacing traditional ingredients with squash and sweet potato, which created a new dessert, picarones.

Picarones are mentioned by Ricardo Palma in his book Tradiciones Peruanas (literally Peruvian traditions). Picarones are also featured in traditional Latin American music and poetry.

This dessert is mentioned in the autobiographical memoirs Remembrances of thirty years (1810-1840) (Spanish: Recuerdos de treinta años (1810-1840)) by Chilean José Zapiola, who mentions that picarones were typically eaten in Plaza de Armas de Santiago (Chile) before 1810.

== Gallery ==
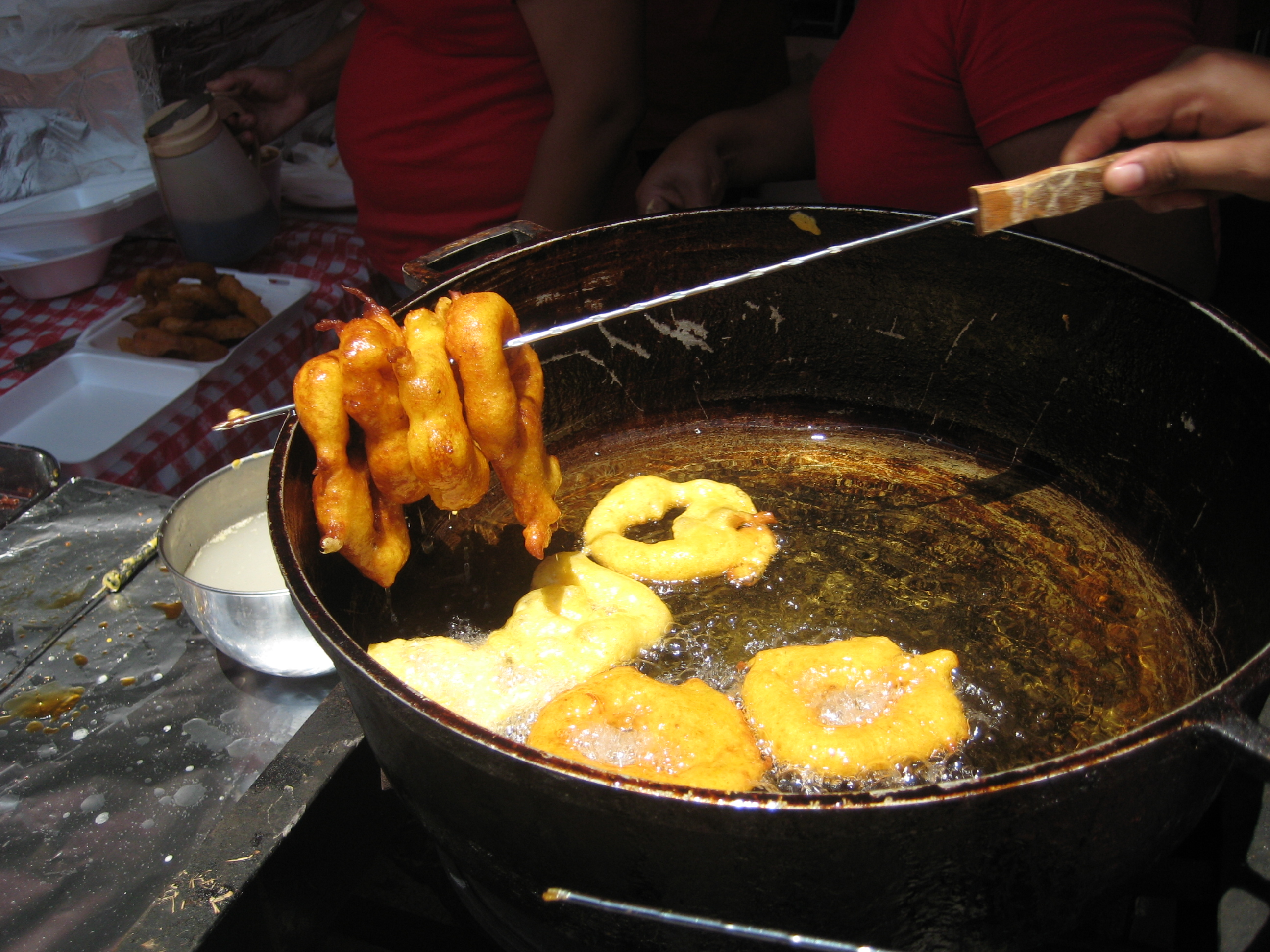
The image above shows one of the steps, deep-frying, of making Picarones.

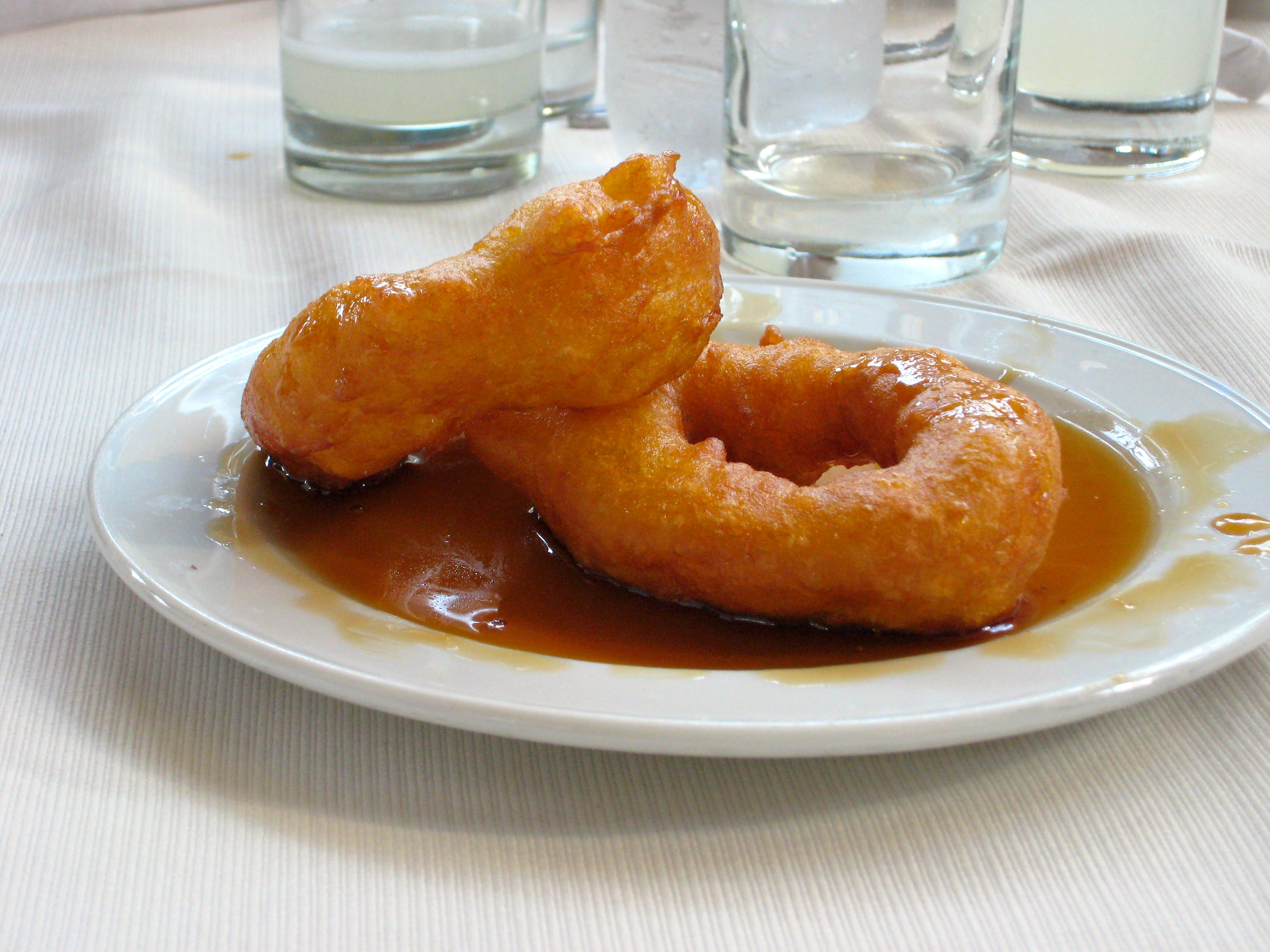
Qué ricos picarones!

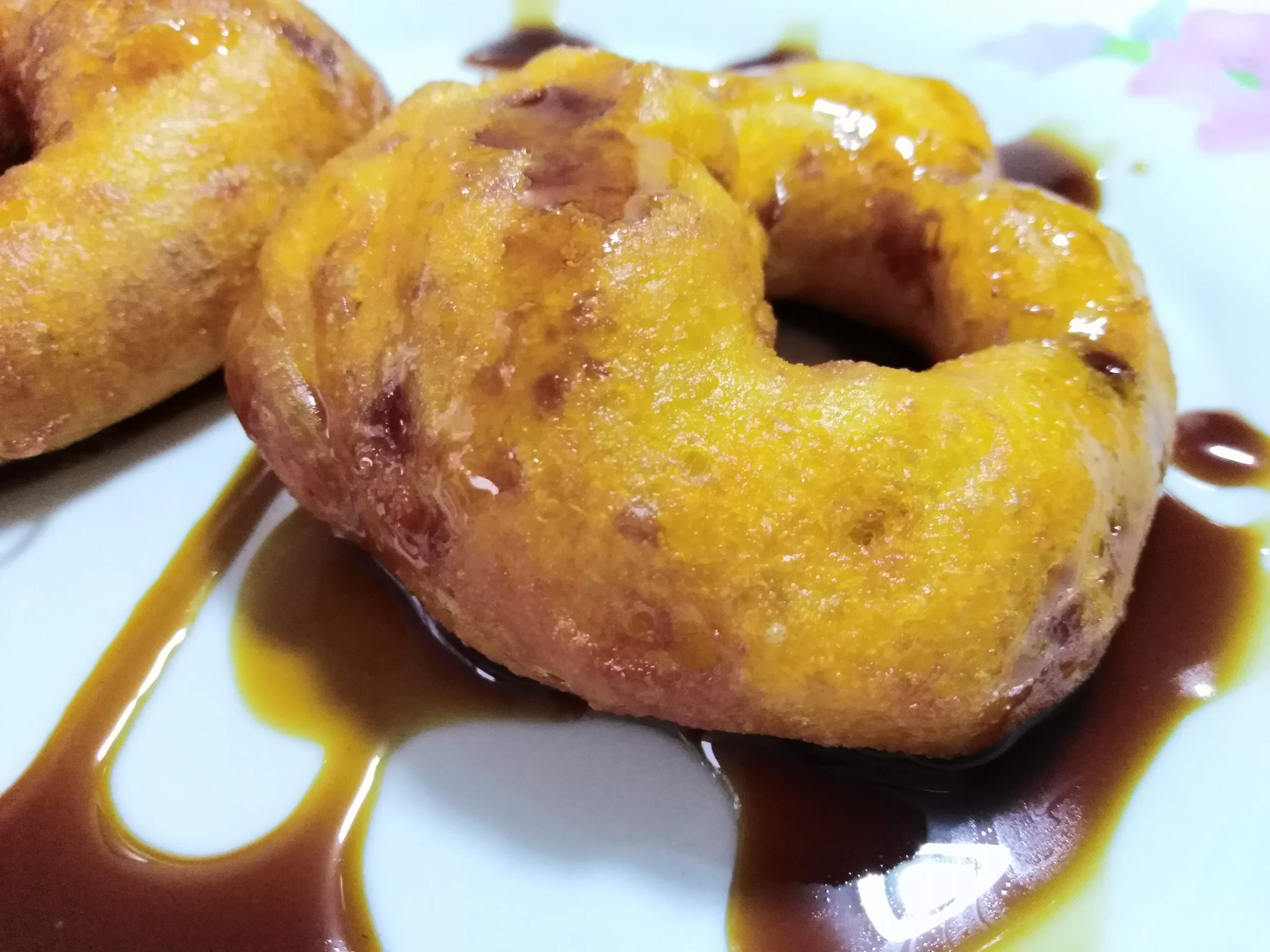
Picarones are one of the main dishes of Peru.

== See also ==
- List of doughnut varieties
- List of fried dough varieties
- List of squash and pumpkin dishes

== Sources ==
- Compton, M. D. April 20, 2004. Peruvian Traditions: Ricardo Palma’s Latin American Historic and Folkloric Tales. United States. AuthorHouse. ISBN 1-4184-1046-2
- (in Spanish) Plevisani, S. 2005. Dulce Pasión. Lima, Perú. Quebecor World Perú.
- (in Spanish) Ada y Maricarmen. February, 1997. El Arte de la Repostería. Lima, Perú. Biblos
- Krystina Castella (3 January 2012). A World of Cake: 150 Recipes for Sweet Traditions from Cultures Near and Far; Honey cakes to flat cakes, fritters to chiffons, tartes to tortes, meringues to mooncakes, fruit cakes to spice cakes. Storey Publishing, LLC. pp. 268–270. ISBN 978-1-60342-446-2.
