= Almond present =

Scandinavian Christmas tradition

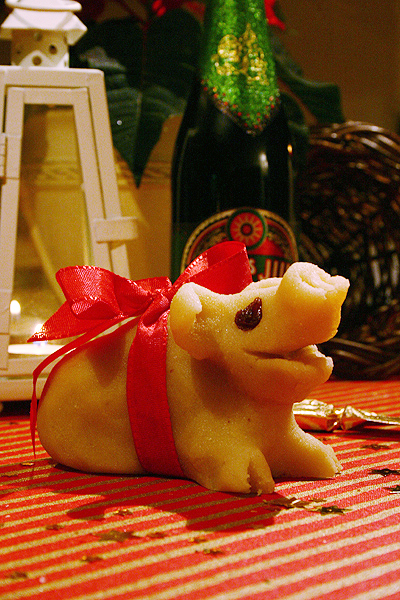
A marzipan pig, an example of a typical "almond present"

An almond present (Danish: mandelgave, Bokmål: mandelgave, Nynorsk: mandelgåve, Icelandic: möndlugjöf, Swedish: mandelgåva) is a small present traditionally given in some Nordic countries to the person who gets the whole almond put in the rice pudding served for Christmas. It is a common Scandinavian tradition for many families, and especially for families with children.

In Denmark, this tradition has been known since the 16th century. The custom with the almond in the porridge has similarities to the king cake custom of Epiphany at the end of the Christmas season.
