= Chancacas =

Traditional Colombian coconut candy

Chancacas are a traditional Colombian coconut candy from Buenaventura, Colombia, a seaport city on the Pacific Ocean. They are made with panela and coconut. Fresh coconut is preferable to dried shredded coconut, but either can be used. The chancacas have a chewy consistency and are flavored with zest of lime and cinnamon.

== See also ==
- Cocadas
