= Riz à l'impératrice =

Rice pudding dish in French haute cuisine

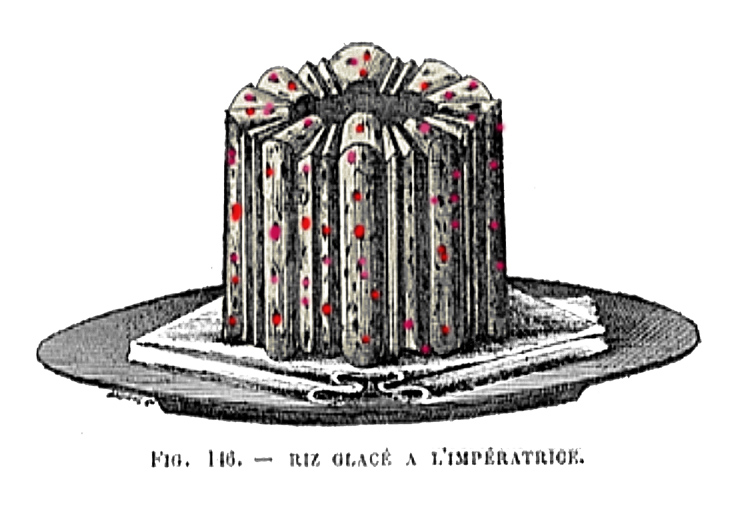
- Illustration of riz à l'impératrice (1889)
- Alternative names: Riz impératrice
- Course: Dessert
- Place of origin: France
- Main ingredients: Rice, gelatin, liqueurs, candied fruit

Riz à l'impératrice (pronounced [ʁi a lɛ̃.pe.ʁa.tʁis]) is an elaborate molded version of rice pudding in French haute cuisine. Rice pudding is mixed with Bavarian cream, set in a charlotte mold, turned out and then decorated with candied fruits macerated in alcohol such as kirsch or maraschino.

The dessert is said to have been named in honor of the Empress Eugénie de Montijo, Empress of France from 1853 to 1870.

Marcel Proust refers to the dish in the first volume of In Search of Lost Time.
