= Arequipan cuisine =

Culinary traditions of Arequipa, Peru

Arequipan cuisine is the cuisine of Arequipa, a regional Peruvian cuisine. Arequipan cuisine is known for its picanterías (place of spicy food), traditional local restaurants offering chicha de jora accompanied by four small plates of spicy rocoto seasoned regional delicacies along with singing or music.

== Picanterías ==
Traditionally, a set list of dishes are served on each day of the week (and rarely changes) as was common during the Spanish colonial era. Monday: chaque, Tuesday: chairo, Wednesday: chochoca, Thursday: red stew or potato flour, Friday: stew, Saturday: stew or timpusca, and Sunday: white broth, pebre loins and adobo.

Arequipa is known for its Spanish colonial style stews and casseroles cooked on firewood in clay pots at picantería. Among the best known are the Chupe de Camarones (shrimp), Ocopa Arequipeña, Rocoto Relleno (stuffed chili), Adobo, Solterito de Queso, Potato Cake, Costillar Frito, Cuy Chactado (Guinea Pig), Cauche de Queso, Locro, Chaque de Pecho, etc. Common items for dessert include: Queso Helado, donuts, Spanish style convent candy, chocolates and Chicha de Jora (made of black corn, beer and anise liqueur).

The menus change daily and include chaque, chairo, pebre, timpusca, river crawfish soup (chupe de camaraones) and Blanco de lomos. Typical plated offering are rocoto relleno (stuffed with chopped meat, peanuts, boiled eggs, olives, cream cheese, and milk) served with baked potatoes. Ocopa (boiled potatoes covered with a cream (ocopa) made from yellow hot pepper, onion, garlic, cream cheese and huacatay (spice leaf) blended with dry bread. It is served with boiled eggs, olives, lettuce. Arequipan adobo with pieces of pork meat marinated overnight in chicha, vinegar, hot pepper and spices and served with gravy. Chairo is a beef broth marinated with yellow hot pepper, garlic, onion, spices, black chuño (a root), pieces of cured meat, tongue of lamb and patasca (a pork and corn stew). It is served with toasted corn. Shrimp soup is made with potatoes, milk, eggs, cheese, spices, hot pepper, and tomato. Chactado is made with Guinea pig or rabbit in a spicy and hot pepper gravy served with boiled potatoes. A regional beer and liquor of anisette are also available, as well as chocolates, bonbons (masapán) and toffees. River crawfish are also a regional specialty.
