= Peruvian huacatay =

Creamy sauce in Peruvian cuisine

- Alternative names: black mint sauce, ají huacatay
- Type: sauce
- Associated cuisine: Peru
- Main ingredients: huacatay leaves
- Ingredients generally used: oil, queso fresco, chiles, garlic, cilantro, scallions, salt
- Similar dishes: Papa a la huancaina

Cream of black mint, also called ají huacatay or black mint sauce, is a creamy sauce prepared with huacatay (or black mint) leaves and blended with other ingredients to accompany various Peruvian dishes. Traditionally used in Peruvian Andean dishes like Ocopa, where it is a key ingredient, this sauce is now also popular as a side for Peruvian parrillada (barbecue) and Peruvian pollada, as well as for other less common meals. Cream of black mint has a green color and thick texture.

== Preparation ==
The sauce is prepared with huacatay, a leafy green herb native to the Andes mountains, which is found growing wild in many fields and small farms. It is not formally cultivated, because it is self-propagating and used by the locals in their condiments. It is similar to the paico (or epazote) plant, which is used in sopa de paico, or paico soup.

In Peru and other Latin American countries, the huacatay leaves are crushed using a fulling mill, a stone tool that serves as a traditional blender. This grinds the leaves more coarsely than a modern blender would, but allows greater absorption of flavor. The sauce is easy to prepare and typically takes 15–30 minutes to make. It is traditionally used in the preparation of chicken parties or barbecues, but many households prepare it on a regular basis.
