= Rescue 911 =

American television series hosted by William Shatner

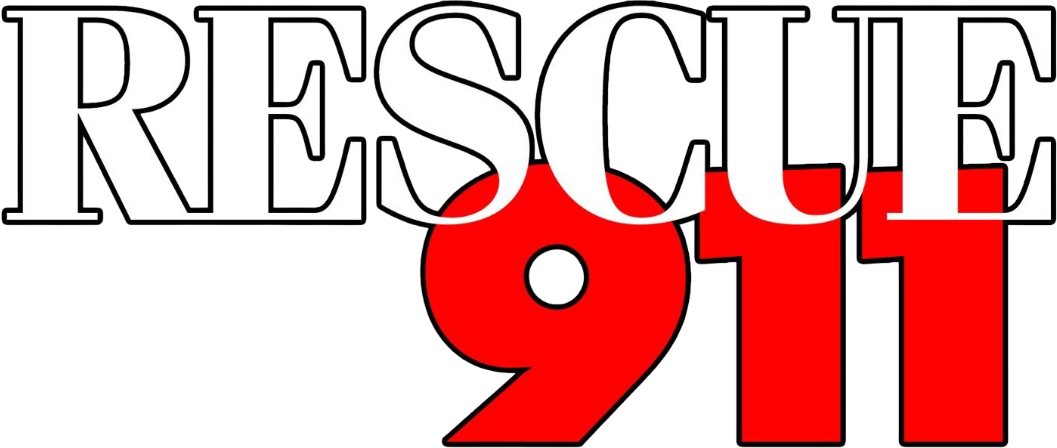
- Genre: Docudrama
- Written by: Paula Deats; Nancy Platt Jacoby; Aaron Kass; Jim Milio; Jean O'Neill
- Directed by: Sheri Goldstein; Mary Hardwick; Nancy Platt Jacoby; Jim Milio; Chris Pechin; Ronnie Weinstock; Segment directors Ron Brody; Mark Cole; Michael Collins; Allison Grodner; Robin Groth; Dan Jackson; Jim Milio; Steve Muscarella; Chris Pechin
- Presented by: William Shatner
- Theme music composer: Scott Roewe
- Composers: Richard Stone (Seasons 1–3); Stu Goldberg (Seasons 4–7)
- Country of origin: United States
- Original language: English
- No. of seasons: 7
- No. of episodes: 186 (and 2 specials) (list of episodes)

Production
- Executive producers: Arnold Shapiro; Jean O'Neill (Seasons 5–7)
- Producers: Nancy Platt Jacoby (Seasons 1–2); Jim Milio (Seasons 3–7); Sueann Fincke (Season 7)
- Running time: 60 minutes (30 minutes in syndication)
- Production companies: CBS Entertainment Productions (1989–1995); CBS Productions (1995–1996); Arnold Shapiro Productions

Original release
- Network: CBS
- Release: April 18, 1989 – August 27, 1996

Rescue 911 is an informational docudrama television series that premiered on CBS on April 18, 1989, and ended on August 27, 1996. The series was hosted by William Shatner and featured reenactments (and occasionally real footage) of emergencies that often involved calls to 911.

Though never intended as a teaching tool, various viewers used the knowledge they obtained watching the show. Two specials, titled 100 Lives Saved and 200 Lives Saved, were dedicated to these viewers who had written to CBS with their stories on how the knowledge they obtained watching the show allowed them to save the lives of others. At least 350 lives have been saved as a result of what viewers learned from watching it. The show's popularity coincided with, if not led to, the widespread adoption of the 911 emergency system replacing standalone police and fire numbers that varied from municipality to municipality; the number is now universally understood in the United States and Canada to be the number dialed for emergency assistance.

At its height, the show was adapted in 45 countries (with their own 911 equivalent showcased).

== Broadcast history ==
=== Conception and early airing ===
The idea for Rescue 911 was conceived in early 1989 by then-president of CBS Entertainment Kim LeMasters, when he heard a recording of a dramatic 911 call on Charles Osgood's radio show while driving to work. LeMasters discussed the idea of creating a television program centered on actual 911 recordings with in-house production head Norman Powell who, in turn, hired documentary producer Arnold Shapiro to produce three television specials. LeMasters initially suggested that Leonard Nimoy should host the show, but Shapiro felt William Shatner would be a better fit due to his role as a police officer on the TV series T. J. Hooker.

The first Rescue 911 special aired on April 18, 1989, and included a segment ("Arlington") featuring the 911 recording that had given LeMasters the idea for the show. A second special aired on May 9, 1989. Both specials received high ratings, prompting CBS to pick up Rescue 911 for the 1989 fall season. It began airing as a regular series on September 5, 1989, and ran for 7 seasons, with the last new episode airing on August 27, 1996, though it was not acknowledged as the series finale. The last episode to air on CBS (a repeat of Episode 627) aired on September 3, 1996.

Though it aired Tuesdays at 8:00 PM for most of its run, Rescue 911 occasionally aired on other nights either as an additional episode shown during that week, or a temporary rearrangement to make room for another program.

=== Syndication ===
In 1993, The Family Channel began airing reruns, but it was removed from the lineup when the Family Channel became the Fox Family Channel in August 1998. The original format was most recently shown in Ecuador on Oromar Televisión and in Brazil on SBT and Canal Viva.

That same year, a reformatted version (see below) of the show was sold into off-network syndication. The syndicated version continued to air both in the U.S. and internationally long after the show's cancellation, but it had not aired in the U.S. since July 2005. The syndicated version of the show aired on the Justice Network from October 2017 to November 2019, on GetTV from August 2019 to May 2020, and had its own channel on Pluto TV up until early 2025, where it aired 24 hours a day.

The following networks have aired the show in the syndicated format:

- Numerous local affiliates
- The Family Channel (also showed the original format)
- Odyssey/The Hallmark Channel
- Discovery Health Channel
- Reality TV/Zone Reality
- Justice Network/True Crime Network
- GetTV
- Pluto TV
- Living
- CI (Australia)
- AXN
- Uganda Broadcasting Corporation (Uganda)
- RPN (Philippines), under partnership with Silverstar Communications

=== Potential revival ===
In October 2018, Variety announced that CBS Television Studios was developing a two-hour Rescue 911 reboot with William Shatner slated to return as host. The reboot would have featured a live format similar to that of Live PD showing rescuers responding to calls in real time (in the original versions, only a small portion of the segments were done as such and were pre-recorded). However, in February 2020, Shatner said in a radio interview that the reboot had not moved forward because CBS could not work out the logistical difficulties of obtaining consent from accident victims to be filmed live as the events unfolded.

In May 2026, Discovery Channel announced that a reimagined version of Rescue 911 would premiere in the fourth quarter of 2026.

=== Seasonal timeslots/ratings ===
Season	TV season	Regular timeslot (EDT)	Episode count	Season premiere	Season finale	Rank	Rating
1	1989–1990	Tuesday, 8 p.m.	30	September 5, 1989	May 15, 1990	#54	
2	1990–1991	Tuesday, 8 p.m.	29	September 11, 1990	May 14, 1991	#31	14.0
3	1991–1992	Tuesday, 8 p.m.	27	September 17, 1991	May 19. 1992	#13	15.1
4	1992–1993	Tuesday, 8 p.m.	28	September 15, 1992	May 25, 1993	#18	14.61
5	1993–1994	Tuesday, 8 p.m.	28	September 14, 1993	May 24, 1994	#29	13.2
6	1994–1995	Tuesday, 8 p.m.	29	September 13, 1994	May 23, 1995	#48	10.8
7	1995–1996	Thursday, 9 p.m.	15	September 12, 1995	August 27, 1996	#84	7.7

=== Additional/alternate timeslots ===
- Season 2: Wednesday, 8 p.m.: April 1990 (in addition to Tuesday at 8 p.m.)
- Season 3: Friday, 8 p.m.: January–February 1992 (in addition to Tuesday at 8 p.m.)
- Season 7: Tuesday, 8 p.m.: September 1995, August–September 1996 (with the majority of the rest of the season airing on Thursdays at 9 P.M.)

=== Ratings by episode ===
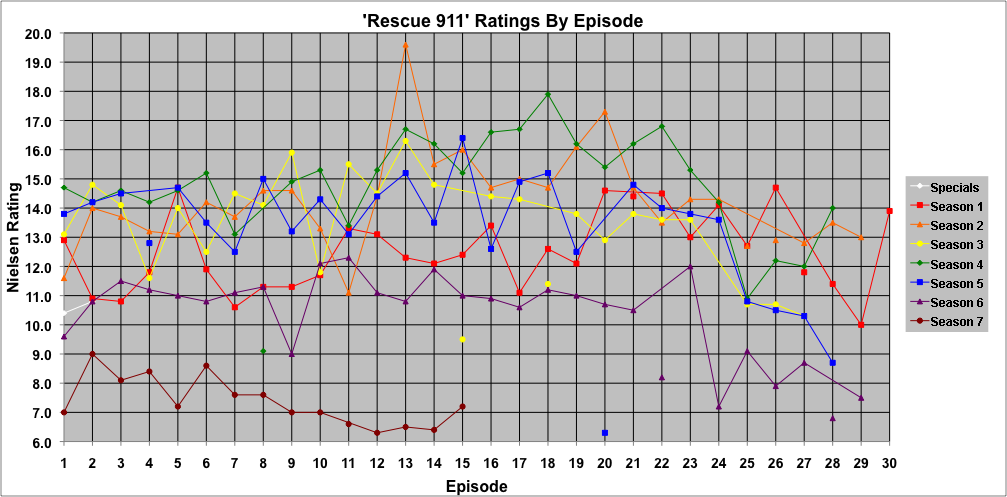

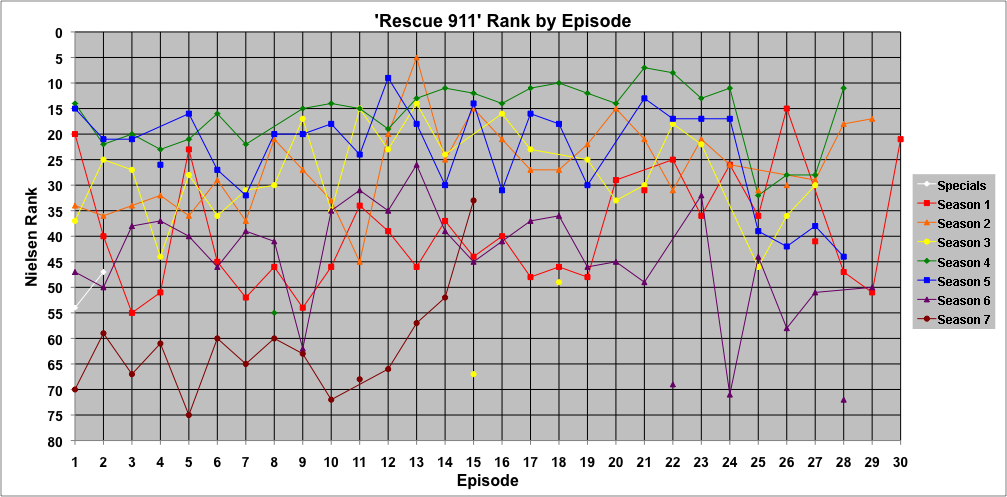

== Format ==
=== Original format ===
When the show aired on CBS, episodes normally ran 60 minutes and featured four stories, although some episodes featured three or five stories. Three-story episodes were common during the second and third seasons, but became less common during the later seasons.

Because the show was paired with The CBS Tuesday Night Movie for most of its run, episodes with irregular running times were occasionally created to accommodate movies that didn't fit the regular two-hour time slot. Such episodes usually ran 30 minutes and contained two stories. Others included a 90-minute episode, a 50-minute episode, a 45-minute episode, and a 15-minute episode containing only one story.

From seasons one through five, an opening disclaimer was shown before each episode. Shatner's voice was heard saying:

"This program contains true stories of rescues. All of the 911 calls you will hear are real. Whenever possible, the actual people involved have helped us reconstruct the events as they happened."

In a few of the early episodes, the last sentence of the disclaimer said:

"Unless indicated, the actual people involved have helped reconstruct the events as they happened."

In seasons six and seven, three segments from the episode were previewed in place of the disclaimer, and a shortened version of the original introduction was shown. Reruns from earlier seasons that aired after September 1994 had their old introductions replaced by the new version of the introduction.

When reruns aired on The Family Channel, episodes were edited for running time, censored for profanity and negative religious references, and graphic footage was sometimes cut out. Family initially showed the opening disclaimer at the beginning of the episodes, but it was later replaced with a short teaser that previewed one or two segments from the episode. Season six episodes that aired on Family had their introductions replaced with the original introduction, although the opening credits were not changed accordingly and were sometimes incorrect. Season seven episodes were never shown on Family.

=== Syndicated format ===
The syndicated version of the show ran 30 minutes and typically included two stories, although a few episodes contained one long-running story. Some syndicated episodes featured stories that began on one episode and concluded on the next, which was never done in the show's original format. These syndicated episodes contained no new material; they consisted entirely of stories taken from episodes that aired in the original format. Stories featured on syndicated episodes were often edited for running time, omitting short scenes that were shown in the original broadcasts. Three hundred syndicated episodes were produced, and they featured segments from the first six seasons of the show.

=== Stories featured ===
==== Presentation ====
Shatner would introduce episodes (and usually, all segments within them) from inside 911 dispatch centers or fire stations, or next to police cars and/or ambulances. He would end episodes from such locations as well. In addition, all segments included voiceover narration by Shatner, interview clips with the people involved and, in many cases, the actual recorded 911 call. Most segments were about 9 to 13 minutes in running time, although some ran shorter, particularly on five-segment episodes, and a few were longer in duration. Usually, the first segment of an episode included a commercial break shortly after the incident itself unfolded, and after the break Shatner would usually pick up again from the station the segment was introduced.

Unless otherwise specified, stories were presented in the form of re-enactments. Occasionally, recorded video footage of all or part of the event itself (usually amateur video or television news coverage) would be used. In these instances, Shatner would mention that a particular amount of footage was taped "as events unfolded" in the opening to a segment in which recorded footage was included. Many re-enactments required complex presentation, such as the recreation of house fires, automobile accidents, police chases, explosions, pregnant women in labor, and even natural disasters.

Some stories took place in the form of a documentary. In these stories, the show's camera crews would ride along with paramedics, firefighters or police, or wait in hospitals and film whatever happened to unfold. These stories usually involved more than one event in a single segment at the same medical facility. One such story was the Charles Stuart murder case, which happened during a ride-along with Boston EMS.

In the show's early seasons, Shatner would close episodes with a statement advising viewers to learn the emergency numbers in their area and to post them by each phone, as not all areas had the 911 system back then. Later in its run, however, the closing statements focused on other lifesaving tips such as learning various first aid techniques, among other things.

Each episode would end with Shatner making some variation of the following statement:

"This series is dedicated to all the men, women, and children who answer our calls for help, and are there when we need them most."

==== Situations ====
Crimes, automobile accidents, medical emergencies, fires, choking/asphyxiation, and miscellaneous injuries were the most common situations presented on the show. Other situations commonly presented on it included technical rescues, near-drownings, childbirth, animal rescues, search and rescue situations, and aircraft-related emergencies. Occasionally, stories involving gas leaks, electrocutions, suicide attempts, scuba diving accidents, drug overdoses, train-related accidents, allergic reactions, and natural disasters were also presented.

Although the show mostly featured serious emergencies, there were occasionally humorous stories of non life-threatening situations and false alarms. Examples included a burglar who got stuck upside-down when he tried to enter a house through the chimney, a young boy who got stuck in a laundry chute while playing hide-and-seek, a young boy whose tongue froze to the inside of a freezer while he attempted to get ice cream, a man who got a plaster mask stuck on his face, a dog that stepped on the 911 speed dial button after getting tangled in the phone cord (although the dog was in danger of being strangled), a woman who got a plaster mold stuck to her torso, a woman who called 911 when she mistook her parents' new mannequin for an intruder, a girl who called 911 after her mom got stuck in her bathroom when the door's lock failed, a boy who got his tongue stuck in a canteen, a woman who got trapped in her apartment behind a mattress, a toddler who got her foot stuck in the toilet while potty training, and a man who woke up to a break-in at his house, only to discover the burglar was a bobcat.

A few segments featured on the show had previously gained national news coverage. These incidents included the New Year's Eve 1986 fire at Puerto Rico's DuPont Plaza Hotel, the 1987 Amtrak train wreck in Maryland, two segments on Hurricane Hugo, the June 1990 Ohio tornado, the Stuart murder case, the Salt Lake City Public Library hostage incident, and the Oklahoma City bombing.

==== Deaths ====
Although the majority of stories featured ended with all lives being saved, there were some exceptions in which one or more victims died. Such occurrences became exceedingly rare later in Rescue 911's run, and usually occurred in documentary segments or in those reenacting multiple casualty incidents in which other victims survived. This list does not include segments where criminals were killed, either directly or indirectly, as a result of the incident with no other deaths.

List of deaths on Rescue 911
- "Church Bus" (Pilot/S1E17): A busload of children of swept away in a flooded river. Ten die, but many others are rescued.
- "Sudden Death" (Special 2/S1E09): A man in his 30s, who was stabbed and went into cardiac arrest, is pronounced dead after doctors try to save him.
- "Atlanta Fire" (S1E06): Five people die in a high-rise office building fire.
- "Baltimore Cops" (S1E06): A man is shot to death in a restaurant.
- "Double Football Player" (S1E09): Former NFL player Jerry Anderson drowns while saving a boy from a river.
- "Puerto Rico" (S1E13): In the Dupont Plaza Hotel arson, 98 people die while many are rescued.
- "Amtrak" (S1E16): Sixteen people die in the train collision in Chase, Maryland.
- "Resurrection Rescue" (S1E19): Three children and a young man are pulled from a burning house. Two of the children survive, but one child and the young man do not.
- "Runaway Boxcars" (S1E19): An elderly woman is killed when the car she is riding in is hit by runaway boxcars; her husband survives.
- "Boston" (S1E20): Charles Stuart murders his pregnant wife; his child later dies, and then he commits suicide.
- "Miami Medchopper" (S1E27): Two men are shot in a restaurant robbery; one dies.
- "Scuba Cave" (S2E02): Two out of three scuba divers are successfully rescued from an underwater cave; one dies.
- "Loma Linda Docu" (S2E02): An infant dies shortly after birth; its heart is transplanted into another newborn infant. Two months after the transplant, the mother's husband dies from a heart attack.
- "Philly Docu" (S2E05): One man dies in a hotel fire later found to be arson; all other tenants escape or are rescued.
- "Daytona" (S2E08): Slick Johnson is killed in a crash during an auto race; a paramedic injured aiding another driver survives.
- "Bingo" (S2E10): A woman dies from complications 3 years after being shot by her husband. She was alive when the episode originally aired, but re-runs indicated that she later passed away.
- "Bar Blast" (S2E19): A man is murdered at a bar; officers chasing the suspects are threatened by gunfire, but survive and are later able to apprehend the suspects.
- S2E21: A man dies after being injured during a stock car race
- "Terror in the Sky" (S2E27): The pilot of an aircraft dies while flying the plane. His wife brings it to a safe landing, saving herself and a friend who was also on board.
- "Denver Chopper" (S2E29): A fleeing bank robber being chased by police strikes and kills a detective, and the suspect is later killed in a shootout with police. The gunman's hostage survives unharmed.
- "Cincinnati Neonatal Docu" (S3E06): A documentary follows three premature babies in a neo-natal care facility; one baby dies, specifically, from severe brain damage due to complications from Group B streptococcal infection.
- "St. Pete Docu" (S3E07): An elderly woman dies after being struck by a car.
- "Fernie's Heart" (S3E19): A boy is killed in a car crash. His family donates his organs, saving a five-year-old boy in need of a heart transplant.
- "Boomer's Rescue" (S3E26): A girl with terminal brain cancer's support dog is rescued from a house fire. She was alive when the episode originally aired, but re-runs indicate that she later passed away.
- "Las Vegas Docu II" (S4E06): A teen's friend is killed in a car crash caused by a drunk driver.
- "Oklahoma Cops Documentary" (S4E14): A young man is killed in a drive-by shooting.
- S5E19: A teen is brain dead after a car crash. Her family donates her organs, saving three people in need of organ transplants.
- "Butane Huffing" (S5E22): A teenage boy dies 11 hours after huffing butane. This was the only re-enacted segment in which the sole victim died.
- "Repentant Drunk Driver" (S6E14): A drunk driver kills a man and seriously injures a woman.
- "Healing the Healers" (S6E27): The Oklahoma City Bombing is profiled.
- "Trooper Buddy Down" (S7E04): A woman is killed in a head-on collision. A state trooper and his pregnant fiancée survive the wreck.

== International versions ==
In New Zealand, TV2 began screening the first season of Rescue 911 in January 1991 and subsequent seasons following this. At the start of each episode, the network would display a reminder to viewers that the emergency number in New Zealand is 111. In 1992, with the permission of CBS, the show was renamed to Rescue 111 in New Zealand. This was done following reports of New Zealanders calling 911 in emergencies instead of 111. The show's starting was shortened with a Rescue 111 title replacing the Rescue 911 title. Its format remained the same, however, with Shatner still addressing the show as Rescue 911 along with all stories mentioning calling 911. He also recorded a special outro for the show reminding viewers of New Zealand's emergency number. When the final series screened in 1996, the show was simply called Rescue.

Featured episodes from the American version of Rescue 911 were dubbed over in Spanish by Venezuelan distributor Etcétera Group. It aired in Mexico from 1993 to at least 1996 on the TV Azteca network, and in Ecuador from 1994 to 2000 on RTS. The series was aired in Spain from 1991 to 2000 on TVE 2 and also on regional networks such as Telemadrid.

=== France ===
The original French version was called La Nuit des héros, broadcast from September 14, 1991 to December 26, 1992 on Antenne 2 (later France 2) and was hosted by Laurent Cabrol until June 1992, then replaced by Michel Creton for the remainder of its run. One reenactment per week came from the original CBS show, who were associated with the production of the French reenactments.

At the end of July 1992, the host Cabrol resigned from Antenne 2. Three weeks later, TF1 announced the broadcast of Les Marches de la gloire, a similar show with Cabrol as host and produced by the same production company, Plaisance Films. A few months later, the TF1 channel was ordered to pay France 2 55 million francs in damages for plagiarism. This version was aired from September 1992 to June 1993.

=== Italy ===
The Italian channel Rai 3 realized its version, called Ultimo Minuto: it ran on Saturday evening, during the period of winter and spring, from 1993 until 1997. It contained also some episodes from Rescue 911 and 999. The series inspired later shows including Eroi per caso (Italia 1, 1999), Vivo x miracolo (La7, 2009–2010), Eroi di tutti i giorni (Rai 1, 2013) and Alive (Rete 4, 2013–2015).

=== Germany ===
German network RTL started its own version with a mix of cases from Germany and the US in 1992. The show ran for over 14 years, with the last episode broadcast on August 27, 2006, and from 1998 to 2001 also aired the offshoot Notruf täglich. In August 2009, the format was briefly revived as Helfen Sie mir!. In 2024, Sat.1 announced a reboot of Notruf, which has been broadcast on weekdays since April 22, 2024 and hosted by Bärbel Schäfer. In contrast to the original series, the cases are not re-enacted by the protagonists, but by actors.

=== Sweden ===
A Swedish version, entitled SOS – på liv och död, was originally broadcast on TV4 from 1993 to 1996 and was hosted by journalist Bengt Magnusson. The programme returned in 2003 on sister channel TV4 Plus (currently Sjuan) and ran for 30 episodes. This version was hosted by firefighter Glenn Borgkvist, also known as the lead singer of Brandsta City Släckers. The features are based on authentic calls received by the emergency centers in both Sweden and the USA.

=== Other countries ===
A British version called 999 (after the UK emergency telephone number) premiered in 1992 and ran on BBC One until 2003, hosted by journalist and newsreader Michael Buerk.

Hungarian channel RTL Klub ran its own version from May 1, 1998, until August 27, 1999, hosted by György Cserhalmi. Each episode contained two cases from Rescue 911, one from Germany's Notruf, and one original story. In Poland, the format has been running weekdays on Polsat since 2016 as Na ratunek 112.

== Merchandise ==
=== Home media ===
In Rescue 911's early seasons on CBS, ads were shown after the end credits of every episode that gave an 800 number viewers could call to order a copy of that night's episode. This ad was dropped in later seasons.

On May 27, 1997, Rescue 911: World's Greatest Rescues was released on VHS. This video featured stories of rescue attempts from around the world; segments were taken from both the U.S. and international versions of the show. The segments on the video were edited for running time, and the original narration on all segments (including those originally narrated by Shatner) were dubbed over by an uncredited narrator. The two stories taken from the U.S. version were about a New Zealand girl pinned beneath a flaming gasoline tanker (season three, episode 25) and the infamous documentary of the Stuart murder case in Boston, Massachusetts (season one, episode 20). The other stories, taken from international versions of the show, were about a Belgian family trapped in a car hanging precariously from a high overpass, a Russian hostage crisis in which a terrorist held two women captive, an Austrian skier who fell into an underground glacial river, and a French mother who was forced to drop her two children 60 feet (18 m) from a burning apartment to bystanders below (the latter segment is not included on some versions of the video).

=== Books ===
Several books were written that recounted stories featured on Rescue 911:

- Rescue 911 Extraordinary Stories by Linda Maron
- Rescue 911 Kid Heroes by Alison Hendrie
- Rescue 911 Amazing Rescues by Alison Hendrie
- Rescue 911 Humorous Rescues by R. M. Ferrara
- Rescue 911 Animal Rescues by R. M. Ferrara
- The Rescue 911 Family First Aid & Emergency Care Book by Julie Motz

=== Toys and games ===
- Model kits: In 1993, AMT-ERTL released three Rescue 911–themed emergency vehicle model kits. Each of the three kits contained decals with the Rescue 911 logo, and each box had on its side panel a synopsis of a relevant story from Rescue 911. These models were:

- Police car (1990 Ford Taurus). The side panel contained a synopsis of "911 Sister Abduction", in which a police officer rescued a six-year-old girl who was kidnapped from her back yard.
- Rescue ambulance (Dodge). The side panel contained a synopsis of "911 Cribbage Choke", in which paramedics performed a risky procedure on board an ambulance to save a young boy choking on a cribbage piece.
- Rescue helicopter (Civilian Medical Rescue Helicopter). The side panel contained a synopsis of "The Helicopter Horse", in which an injured horse was lifted out of a canyon by helicopter.

- Squirt Extinguisher: In 1993, JA-RU, Inc. released a toy fire extinguisher water squirter.
- Handheld game: In 1993, Micro Games of America released a handheld game based on the show. The objective of the game is to help the firefighter extinguish the fire in the building and the electrical room while avoiding falling debris.
- MatchBox Rescue 911 themed cars Pacecar, medic's car, and fire observer van and police van along with a search and rescue-themed vehicles.
- Slot car sets: In 1993, Marchon, Inc. released two slot car sets called "Rescue 911 Chopper Rescue" and "Rescue 911 Police Pursuit". The Chopper Rescue set included two slot cars (a fire truck and a police jeep) and a complete racetrack. A unique feature of this track was that it allowed racers to jump their cars over a canyon with the aid of a magnetic helicopter. The Police Pursuit set included two slot cars (a sports car and a police car) and a battery-powered racetrack with an automatic lap counter.
- Emergency Communications Vehicle: In 1993, Marchon, Inc. released a toy battery-powered police car with a remote control intercom.

=== Pinball machine ===
In May 1994, Premier Technologies, trade-name Gottlieb, released a Rescue 911 pinball machine. It featured a helicopter that magnetically captured the ball as well as a red revolving light on the backbox. In March 2016, it was released in The Pinball Arcade for PC, Android mobile devices and iOS.

== Awards ==
Year	Award	Result	Category	Recipient
1990	People's Choice Awards	Won	Favorite New TV Dramatic Series	-
1992	BMI Film & TV Awards	Won	BMI TV Music Award	Scott Roewe and Stu Goldberg
1993	BMI Film & TV Awards	Won	BMI TV Music Award	Scott Roewe and Stu Goldberg
1994	BMI Film & TV Awards	Won	BMI TV Music Award	Scott Roewe and Stu Goldberg
