= Papa a la huancaína =

Peruvian appetizer

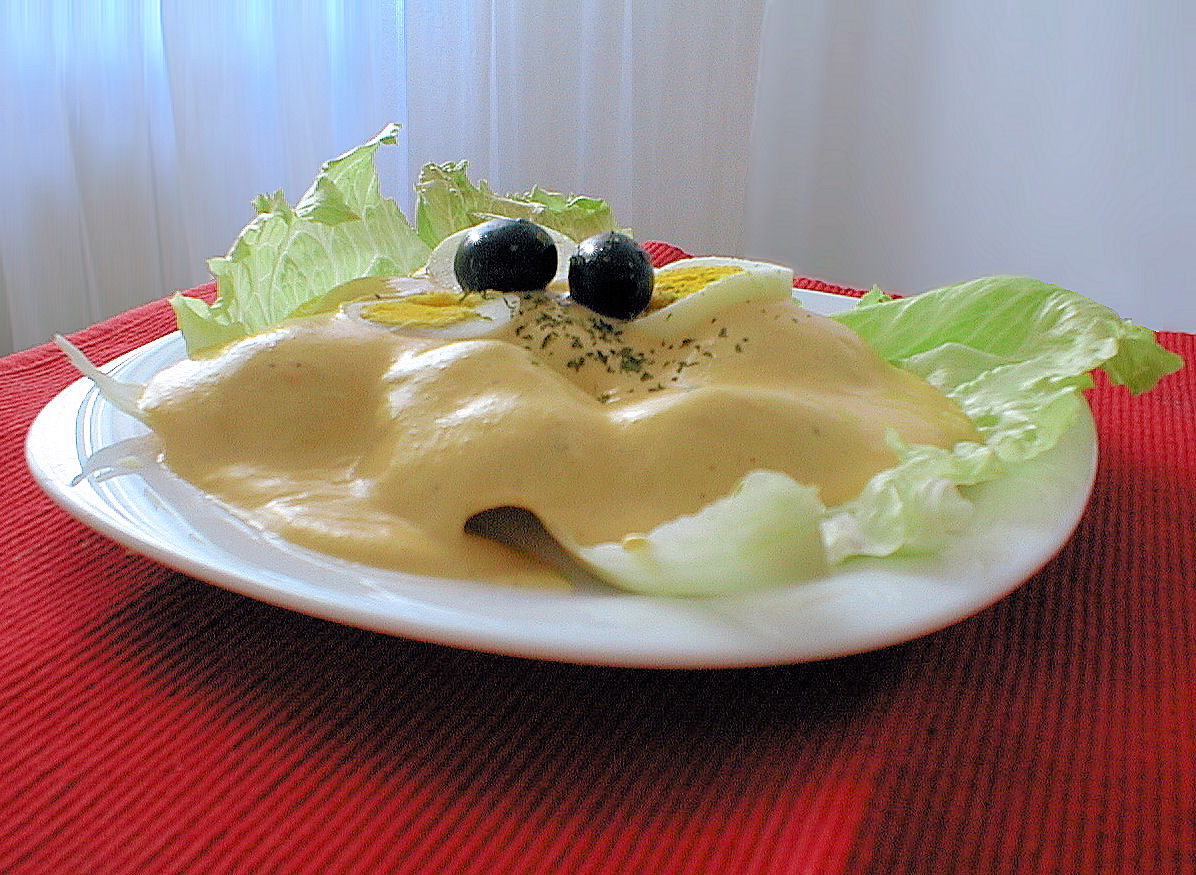
- Course: Hors d'oeuvre
- Place of origin: Peru
- Serving temperature: Cold
- Main ingredients: Yellow potatoes, Huancaína sauce (queso fresco, vegetable oil, ají amarillo, evaporated milk, salt)

Papa a la huancaína (literally, Huancayo-style potatoes) is a Peruvian appetizer of boiled potatoes in a spicy, creamy sauce made of queso fresco (fresh white cheese) and sautéed or grilled ají amarillo (yellow Peruvian pepper), red onion and garlic, all traditionally ground or pounded in a batán. Although the dish's name is derived from Huancayo, a city in the central Peruvian highlands nearest Lima, it has become a staple of everyday and holiday cuisine throughout the country. It is one of the most popular and representative gastronomic products of Peru.

== Presentation ==
It is typically served cold as a starter over lettuce leaves and garnished with black olives, white corn kernels and hard-boiled egg quarters.

In the south of Peru (Cuzco, Puno, Arequipa), it is served with ocopa rather than huancaína sauce, made from freshly toasted peanuts, fried onions and tomatoes, ají amarillo, cream or condensed milk, crushed crackers or dried bread, salt, and huacatay (Tagetes minuta).

Because it is served cold, papa a la huancaína is a favorite food of Peruvians to take on picnics and trips.

== Origin ==
The origin of papa a la huancaína is controversial. On one side, stories exist that point to the area of Lima:

- The most well-known story explains that it emerged during the construction of Peru's Central Railroad, stretching from Lima to Huancayo. Food for the workers was prepared by Huancan women who boiled potatoes and served them with a cheese, pepper and milk sauce, which became papas a la huancaina.
- A more modern story explains that the dish was served at the railway stations between Lima and Huancayo, sold to passengers as a light food consisting of potatoes bathed in a delicious cheese and pepper sauce. From that came the name "potatoes that you eat in route to Huancayo" which evolved to papa a la huancaina.

While the cheese and the potato are produced along the Peruvian sierra, they are also produced along the coast. In fact, the cultivating of the yellow pepper takes place only in coastal zones (4,000-year-old yellow pepper remnants have been found in the archaeological sites of Huaca Prieta and Ancon). In addition, the olives that accompany the preparation also originate from the coast, and not the city of Huancayo. It does not match the preparation style of typical Huancan food, which often consists of hot foods made with red meat.
