= Picantería =

Peruvian traditional restaurant

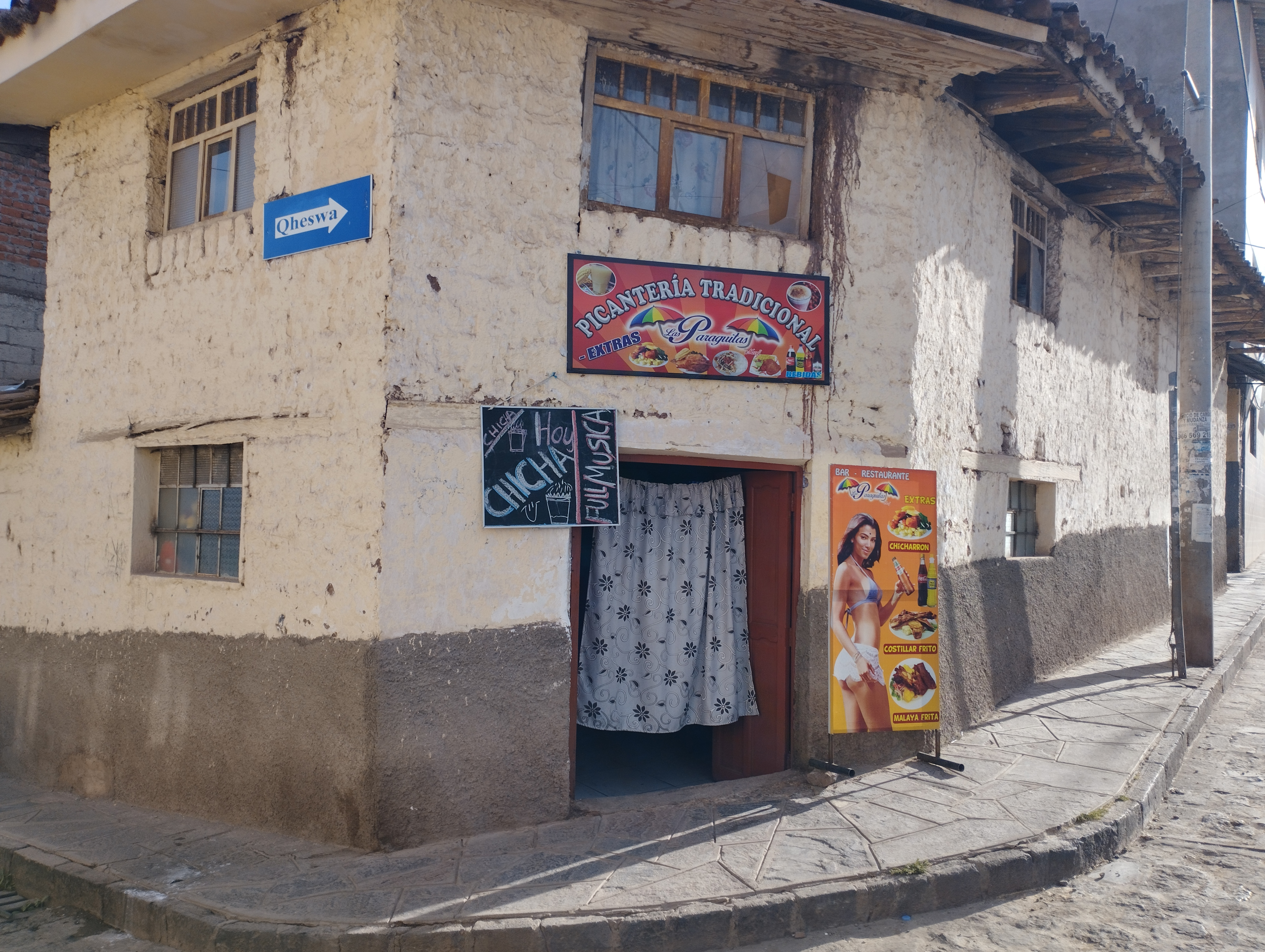
A picantería in Cusco, 2022.

A picantería, is a traditional lunchtime restaurant in Peru, predominantly in and around the cities of Arequipa and Cuzco. Typical offerings of Arequipan cuisine include chicha corn beer made out of a locally grown black corn called Guinapo. Meanwhile in the north of Peru they make chicha de Jora which is germinated corn. Dishes include "Chupes", more stews than soups, which have a designated day of the week. Picanteria refers to a place serving picante ("spicy"), a one-plate dish of various stews.

It is usual for the restaurant to offer a lunch menu of soup and a small main dish according to the following weekly scheme: Monday: Chaque, Tuesday: Chairo, Wednesday: Chochoca, Thursday: red stew or black potato flour soup, Friday: Sopa de Viernes, "Friday soup" made with fish, Saturday: Timpusca, and Sunday: white broth, pebre lamb loins and breakfast adobo.

Among the most traditional food served in Picanterias are: Chupe de Camarones (shrimp), Ocopa Arequipeña, Rocoto Relleno (stuffed chili), Adobo, Solterito de Queso, Potato au-gratin, Costillar Frito, Cuy Chactado (Guinea Pig), Cauche de Queso, Locro, Chaque de tripas, etc. Common items for dessert include: Queso Helado, Bunuelos (donuts-like made out of squash and sweet potato), Spanish style convent candy, chocolates and Chicha (made of black corn). It is a custom in picanterias to offer a shot of anise flavored liquor called a "cortesia" - on-the-house.

== History ==
Picanterias were born in the countryside. A house with a post hung with a red cloth was the place where field workers knew there was food offered. Clients would enter via the kitchen so they could see what was being cooked and could place their order. The dining room was rustic, with benches ranged along large tables. The atmosphere was usually conducive to lively conversation, even among strangers.

Picanterias supplied the social space that bars provide in some countries. After eating, and following the conversation, liquor was served. In order to satisfy guests' hunger, owners created the "Picante", which is served only late afternoon and before closing.

There are still original picanterias in the rural area and in Arequipa city, but many picanterias have disappeared or are at risk of disappearing. Some have turned into modern restaurants serving traditional food but with modern settings. There are still some with the kitchen open to the diners, traditional tables and furnishings.

== See also ==
- Tapas
