= Queso helado =

Peruvian ice cream dessert

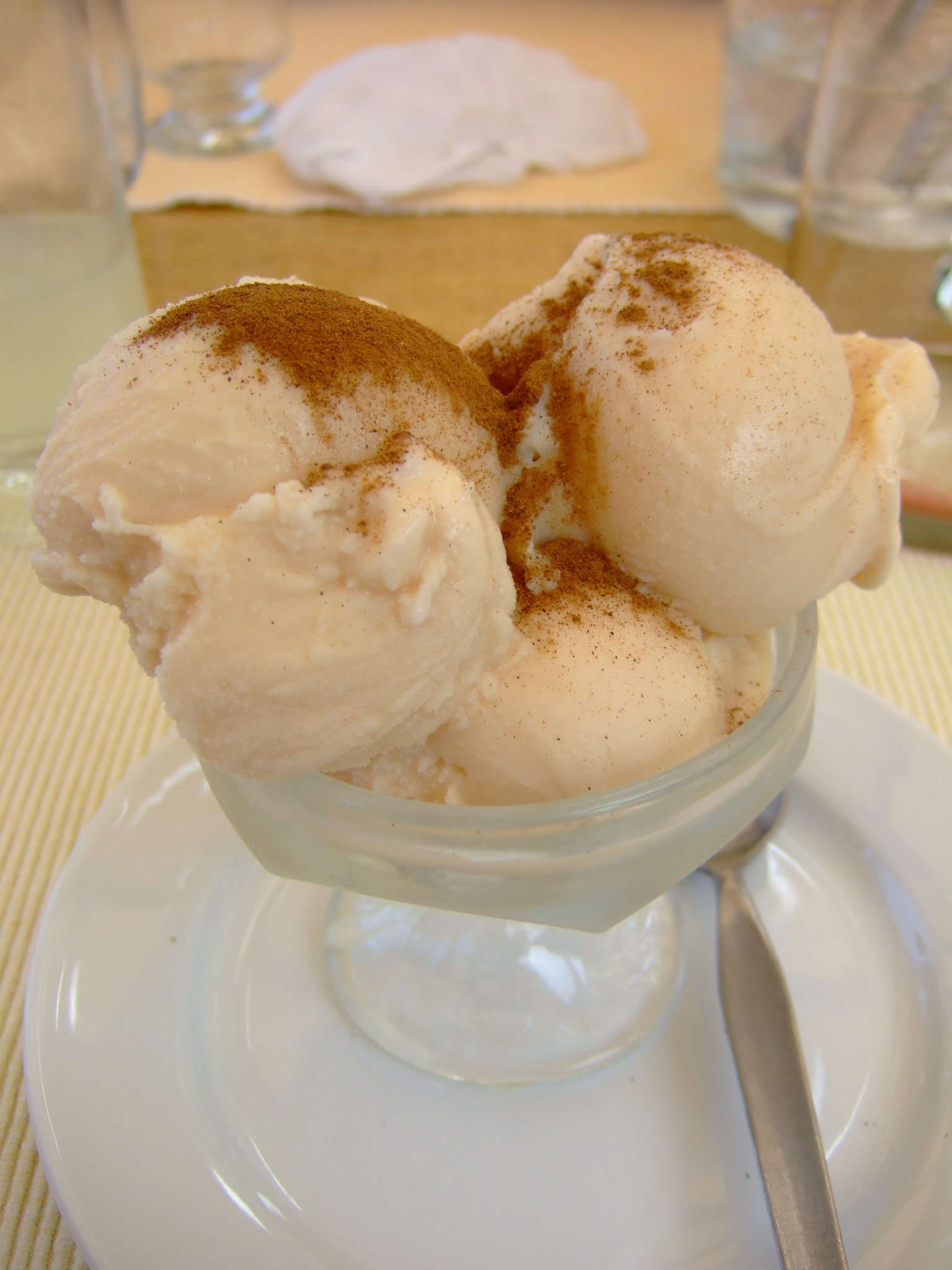
- Alternative names: Helado de tarro
- Type: Frozen dessert
- Place of origin: Arequipa, Peru
- Main ingredients: milk, condensed milk, cinnamon

Queso helado is a dessert typical of the Peruvian regional Arequipan cuisine. While its name literally translates as "frozen cheese," the dessert contains no cheese but instead is made of fresh and condensed milk.

== Description ==
Queso helado is a frozen milk dessert that, despite a name that means "frozen cheese," is not made with cheese, but instead with a combination of fresh milk and condensed milk. Its texture is creamy, and it is generally prepared artisanally in various flavors, although some businesses do produce queso helado industrially.

== History ==
As queso helado is milk-based, its origins can be traced to the Spanish conquest of Peru, when the Europeans introduced cattle to the Andes. Its popularity boomed in the 18th century when cattle farming expended to Arequipa's Chuquibamba, Viraco, and Pampacolca areas, which were home to high levels of milk production. The dessert is also linked to the cattle farming areas near the Coropuna volcano.

One of the first places where queso helado was prepared was the Monastery of Santa Catalina de Siena, Arequipa, where it was made as an ice cream substitute.

The dish is also sometimes known as helado de tarro due to the metal container it is traditionally prepared in.

Since 2012, the government of Arequipa province has organized the Day of Arequipan Queso Helado at the Plaza de Armas de Arequipa every fourth Sunday in January.

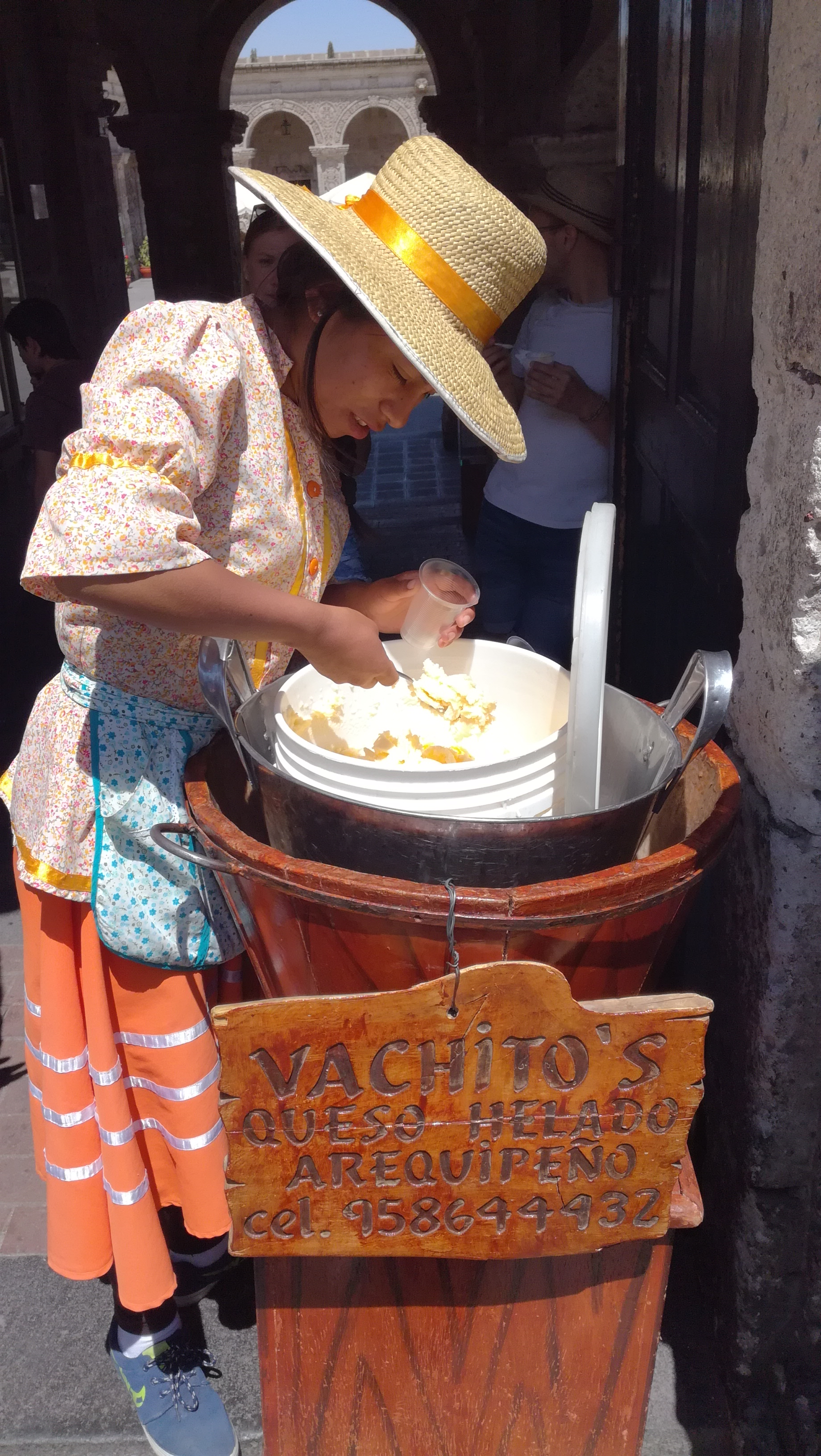
A vendor serves queso helado.

== Preparation ==
Traditionally, to prepare queso helado, one uses a deep wooden vessel filled with ice and salt, in which a smaller, conical, stainless steel container is placed. The steel cone is turned while a wooden spoon is used to beat a previously boiled mixture of fresh milk, condensed milk, powdered chuño (which serves as a thickener), and cinnamon until the mixture begins to freeze in layers that resemble slices of cheese (hence the name queso helado). It is also common to add shredded coconut and spices, like vanilla, at this stage. When serving queso helado, powdered cinnamon is added on top to decorate.

== See also ==
- Stir-fried ice cream
- Ice milk
- Helado de paila
