= El Pescado Frito =

- Genre: Suspense
- Created by: Paco Cuesta
- Starring: Fernando Gálvez; Domenic Menesini; Rudy Arana; Nathalia Espinoza; Ketsia Borosky; Romina Guillén
- Country of origin: Ecuador
- Original language: Spanish
- No. of episodes: 6

Original release
- Network: Oromar Televisión
- Release: 2025

El Pescado Frito (English: The Fried Fish) is an Ecuadorian television series created by Paco Cuesta. It premiered on Oromar Televisión in 2025. The plot revolves around the story of violence around a group of transsexual women working in a picantería in Guayaquil, recognized for its famous fried fish recipe.

== Plot ==
Lula de Silva is a cook, who invents her own fried fish recipe, which turns the small restaurant in which she worked into a success. However, one day Lula is killed and her sister La Gata accuses Miguelito, who is the dishwasher of the restaurant and who is in a romantic relationship with Doménica, the transsexual daughter of La Gata. As Miguelito was the only one who now knew the recipe, La Gata begins to devise a plan to steal the secret and get rid of him. However, knowing her other's intentions, her daughter Doménica does not approve of the plan. On the other hand, the rest of the restaurant workers, all trans women, who are known as La Ratonas ("the Mouses"), decide to intervene to find the real killer to be able to save the restaurant and keep their jobs.

== Cast ==
The cast of the series consisted of mostly transgender actors:

- Fernando Gálvez as Lula de Silva
- Domenic Menesini as Doménica
- Rudy Arana
- Nathalia Espinoza
- Ketsia Borosky
- Romina Guillén

== Production ==
The series was created by producer and screenwriter Paco Cuesta. The premise of the series is inspired by an actual picanteria known as El Pescado Frito, which was located in the South Market area of Guayaquil in the 1970s and employed transsexual women. According to Cuesta, the site was attended late at night by people from all walks of life and was one of the few places where trans people could work without fear of discrimination.

The idea for the series came from a short story published by Cuesta in 2017. He began to develop the script and presented the idea to the Secretariat of Human Rights, which decided to support the project. At first, Cuesta thought of adapting the story into a short film, but later he decided to develop it into a full-length feature film, but eventually settled into dividing into several episodes for a series. The filming was done in a restaurant specializing in seafood located in the south of Guayaquil, in addition to other locations such as Puerto Santa Ana and the kitchen of the Teatro Centro de Arte León Febres-Cordero. The filming of the episodes were completed in 2019. According to Cuesta, the script was revised several times during the filming based on suggestions from the cast.

== Release ==
The first six episodes of the series was released on 30 August 2022 in the Center for Production and Innovation in the University of the Arts. At first, very few television channels showed interest in acquiring the series and they hesitated as they were not sure of getting sponsors for a transgender-themed series, which caused the post-production process to be delayed several years. The entire series finally premiered on the Ecuadorian channel Oromar Televisión on 26 October 2025.

== Critical reception ==
At the time of its premiere, the local press highlighted the production that it generated visibility for the diverse sexual groups in the national television and help break the stereotypes. Being the first series to be constituted almost entirely by transgender actors, the media praised that the series will help raise awareness on the community and to counter the violence and discrimination against them.
