= Helado de paila =

Ecuadorian and Colombian dessert

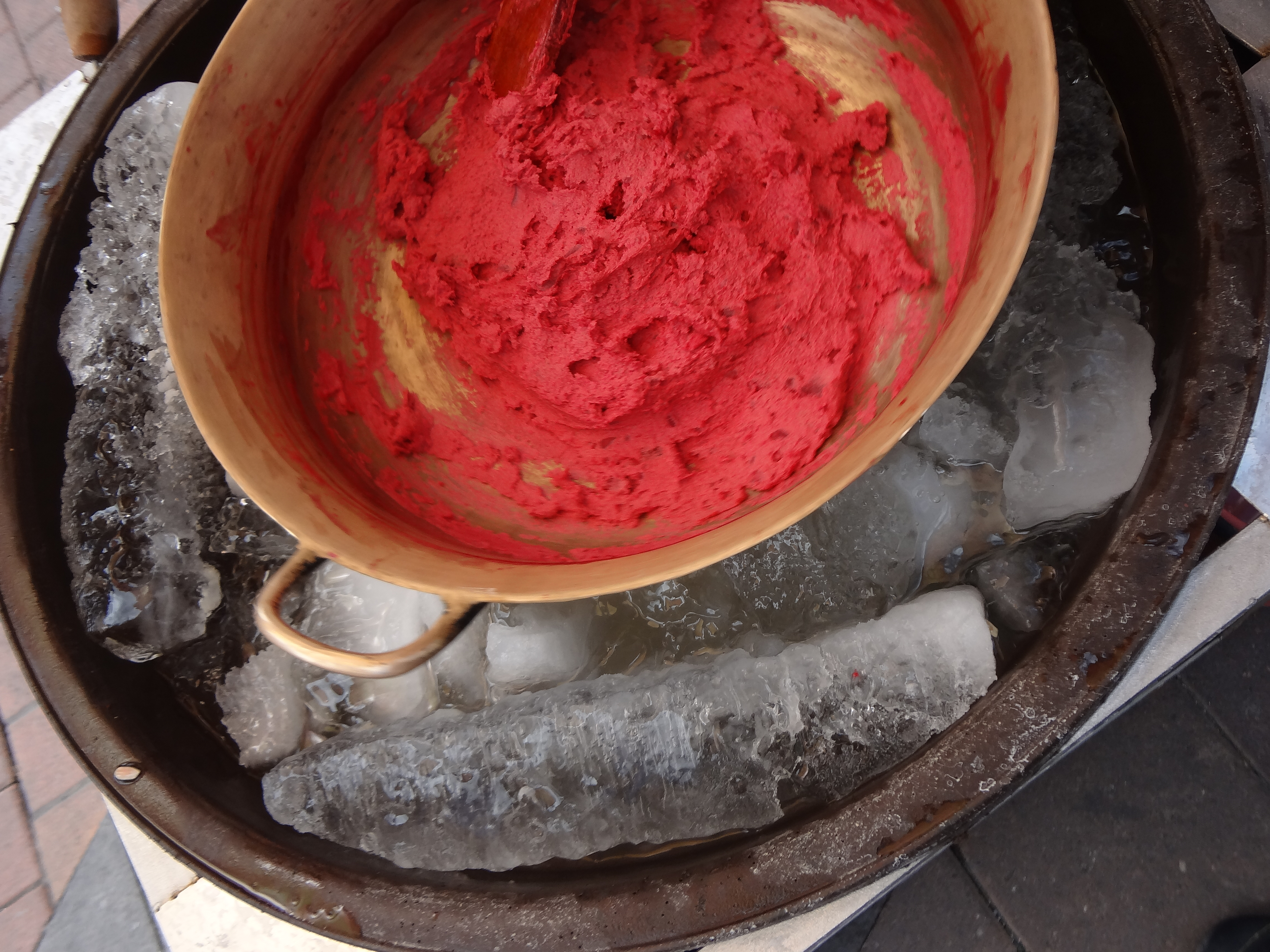
- Type: Frozen dessert
- Place of origin: Andean regions of Ecuador and Colombia
- Main ingredients: fruit, sugar

Helado de paila is a creamy frozen dessert with an intense fruit flavor. Originating in the Andean region of South America, it is made by hand in a large bronze basin, known as a paila, resting on a container of ice and salt, using various aromatic fruits.

The process of making helado de paila developed in the highlands of northern Ecuador and southern Colombia, including in Imbabura Province and Nariño Department. It was invented during a period before refrigeration, and it was made using ice that formed at low temperatures in the inter-Andean moors.

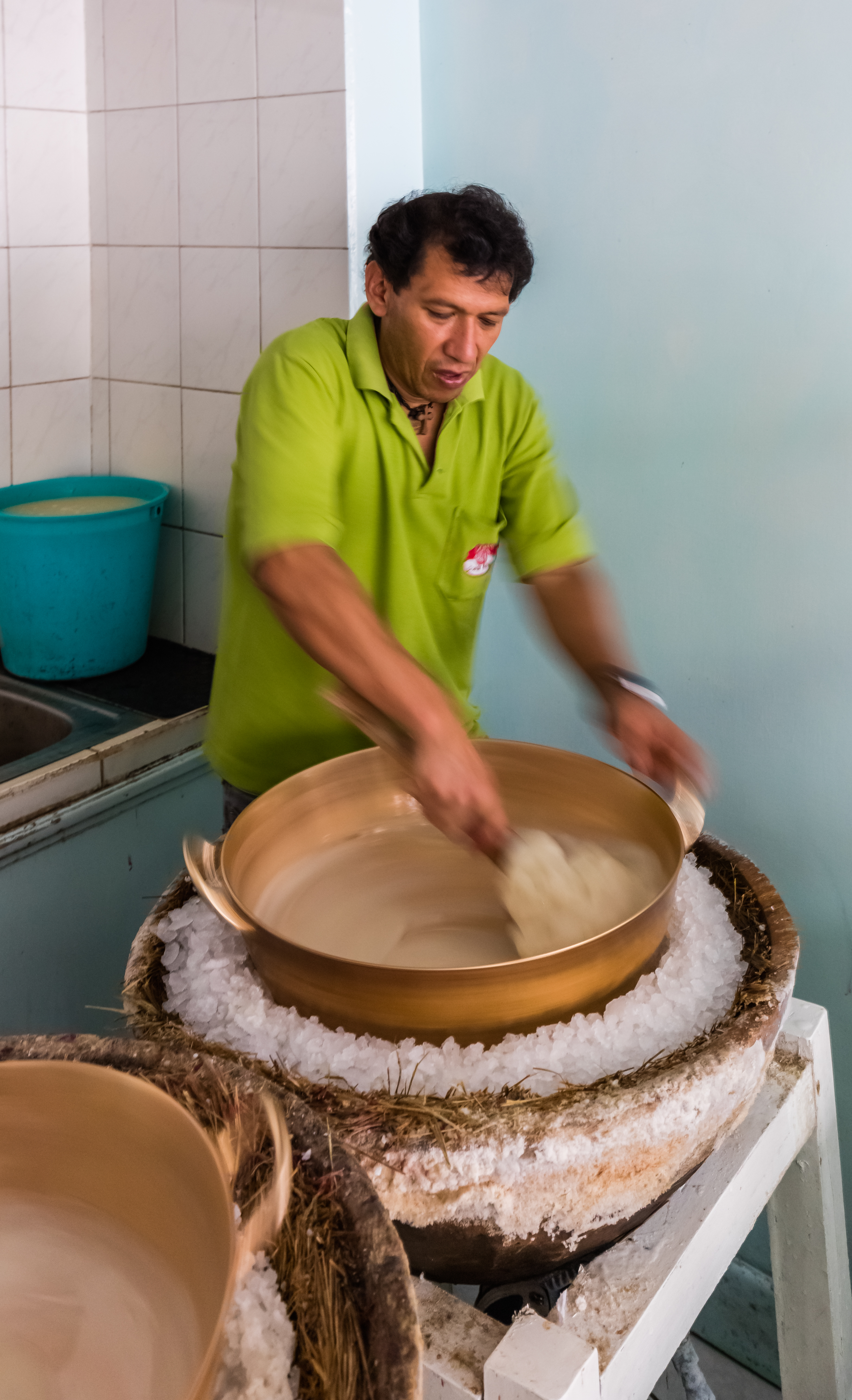
A vendor prepares helado de paila in San Antonio de Ibarra, Ecuador.

Today, helado de paila continues to be made at various Colombian and Ecuadorian tourist sites, markets, and festivals, in flavors like blackberry, soursop, naranjilla, coconut, strawberry, tree tomato, mango, and passion fruit. The fruit is blended with sugar before being stirred with a wood spatula in the basin over ice and a bed of straw, producing a texture similar to that of sorbet.

== See also ==
- Shaved ice
- Queso helado
- Stir-fried ice cream
