= Chuño =

South American freeze-dried potato product

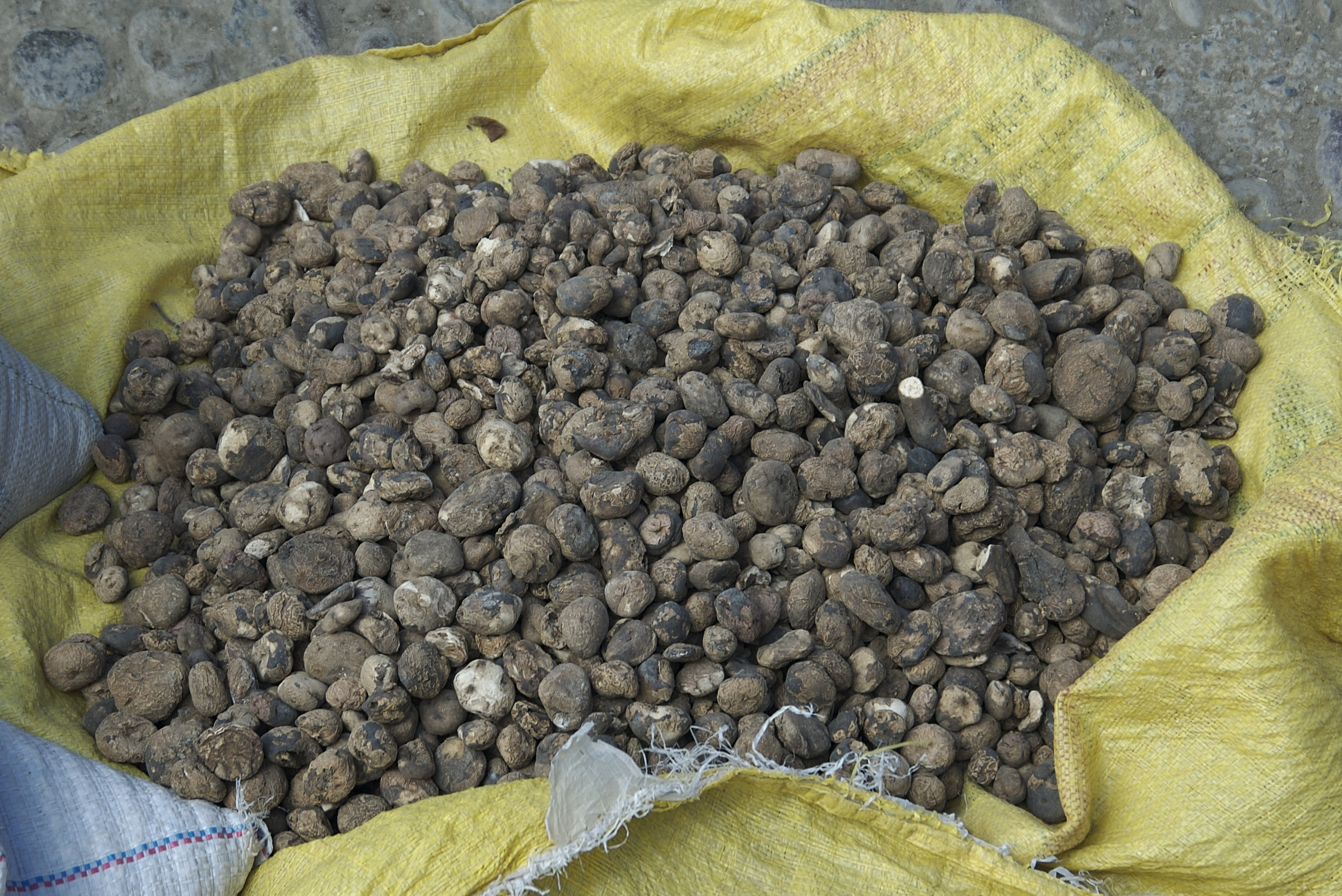
- Place of origin: Bolivia and Peru
- Main ingredients: Potatoes

Chuño (Spanish pronunciation: [ˈtʃuɲo]) is a preserved potato product traditionally made by Quechua and Aymara communities of Bolivia and Peru, and is known in various countries of South America, including Bolivia, Peru, Chile and Northwest Argentina. It is a five-day process, obtained by exposing a bitter, frost-resistant variety of potatoes to the very low night temperatures of the Andean Altiplano, freezing them, and subsequently exposing them to the intense sunlight of the day (this being the traditional process). The word comes from Quechua ch'uñu, meaning 'frozen potato' ('wrinkled' in the dialects of the Junín Region).

== Origins ==
The existence of chuño dates back to before the time of the Inca Empire in the 13th century, based on findings that have been made of the product at various archaeological sites. Specifically, they have been found at Tiwanaku, site of a culture which developed in the Collao Plateau, a geographic zone which includes territories of Bolivia and Peru.. It had been described in 1590 by Spanish chronicler José de Acosta. Due to its portability, long shelf life, and nutritional value, chuño was eaten by Inca soldiers on marches. Indeed Carl Troll argued that the nighttime sub-freezing temperatures of southern Peruvian highlands that allowed for chuño production favoured the rise of the Inca Empire.

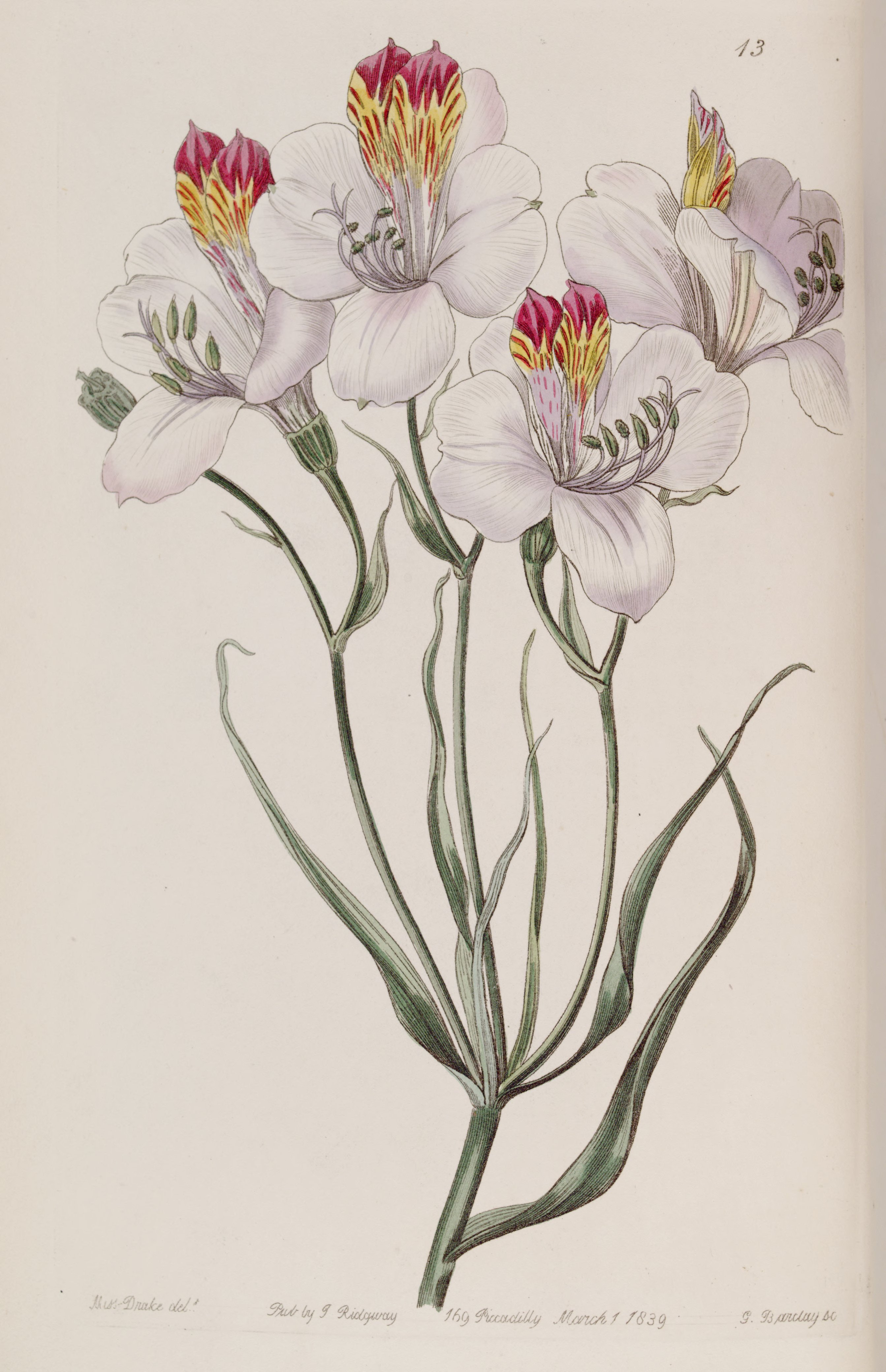
Alstroemeria ligtu

A form of chuño (chuño de liuto or chuño de concepción) is made from the starchy storage roots of Alstroemeria ligtu.

== Production ==
Chuño is made at the beginning of winter during June and July, during which time the temperatures reach around −5 °C (23 °F) at elevations of over 3,800 metres (12,500 ft). After fall harvest (April–May), potatoes are selected for the production of chuño, typically small ones for ease of processing. These small potatoes are spread closely on flat ground, and allowed to freeze with the low night temperatures and dehydrate in the daytime, for about three nights. This process results in natural freeze-drying.

By the end of this process, the potatoes are taken to chuñochinapampas – flat areas where the potatoes can be laid out. The term is Aymara in origin and translates to “the place where the chuño is made”. Once they make it to the chuñochinapampas, they are trampled by foot, traditionally through the work of extended family groups and their pets. This eliminates what little water is still retained by the potatoes, and removes the skins, enabling subsequent freezing and drying. They remain as they are for over a week, depending on weather conditions.

During the process of manually squeezing water out of the potatoes via stepping on them, whole families will participate. The previous freeze-drying breaks down cell walls, making it easier to remove water from the potatoes. They build a small pile of potatoes with their feet and then "dance" on the pile, removing the skins as they do so. This will not entirely remove the skins, so the remaining skin is removed by hand afterwards. Starting from this basic freeze-dry process, two varieties are obtained:

=== White chuño ===
White chuño is obtained by washing the frozen potatoes. The washing may take various forms. In Bolivia, the potatoes are spread on blankets or straw and constantly sprayed with water to moisten. In Peru, the frozen potatoes are transported to a river, and deposited in pools. This washing typically takes about a week. The final step is drying in the sun. The result is now called chuño, also known as papas secas (Spanish for 'dry potatoes'). In Bolivia, white chuño is also called tunta.

=== Black chuño ===
Black chuño is obtained directly from the original freezing, trampling, and refreezing process. The product is not washed or exposed to water again; after freezing and trampling, it is simply sun-dried. Black chuño production has less regional variation than white chuño, and is more likely to be kept and consumed by farmers than the more commercialized white chuño.

== Preservation and consumption ==
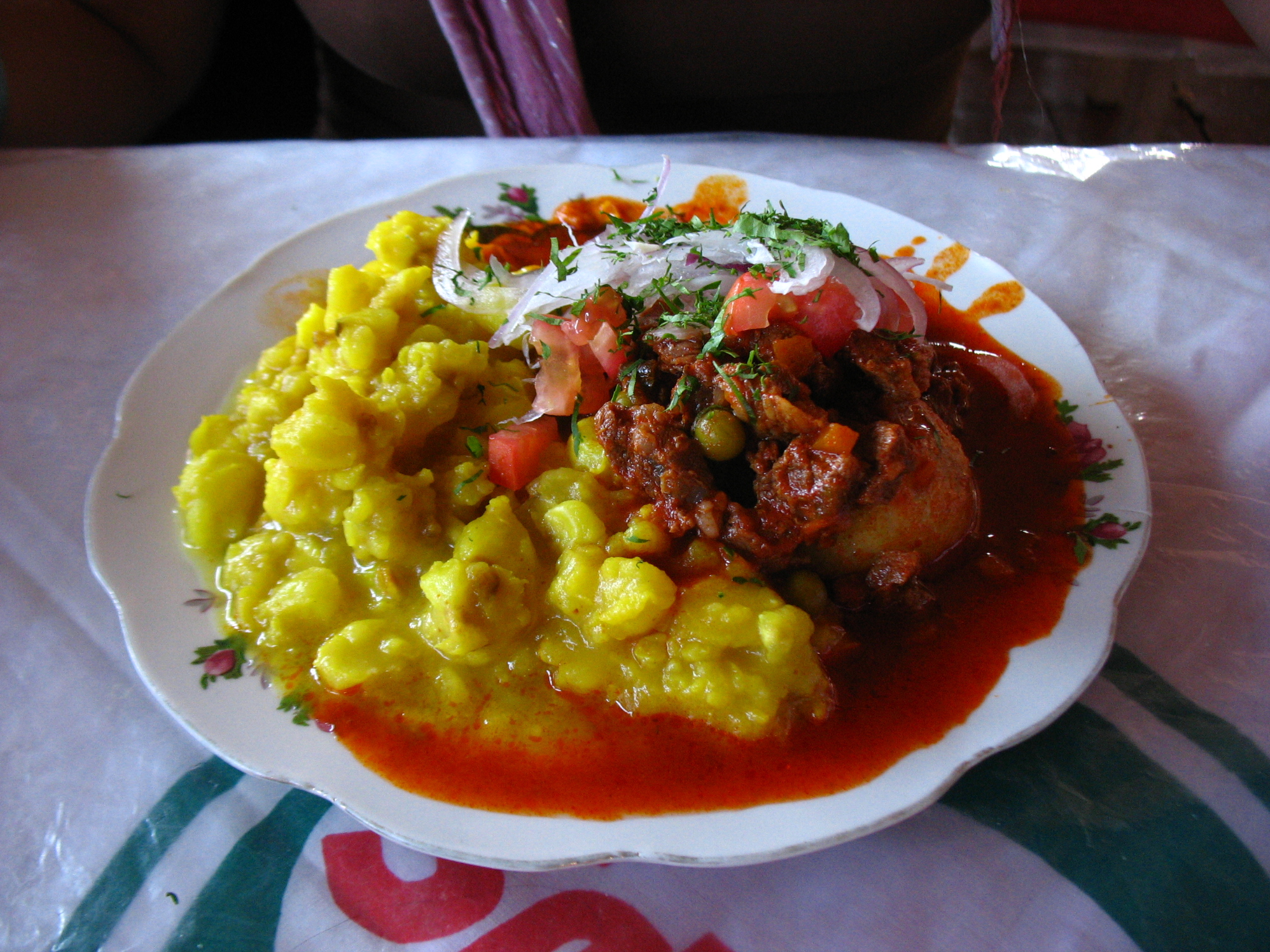
Maize with chuño and chili

Once dried, and with minimal care in storage, the product can last for a very long time, sometimes decades.

Consumption is varied, from desserts to prepared dishes, as well as chuño flour, which is an essential ingredient in many dishes of Peruvian cuisine. Chairo is one of the most traditional Bolivian soups and it is made with chuño, meat, and vegetables. Especially in Bolivia, chuño is not considered the same as a regular potato. In certain recipes, chuño and potatoes should not be used interchangeably. Chairo, for example, is not considered the same without the ground chuño. The other ingredients – wheat, carrots, etc – can be substituted, but not the chuño. It is also traditional in southern regions of Peru such as Arequipa and Puno. Another soup, this one made using whole chuño, is jakonta. More simply, chuño can be eaten with a variety of sauces.

== See also ==
- Freeze-drying
- Food preservation
- List of dried foods
- Pachamanca
- Ocra (Peru), a Quechua village where traditional chuños are made

== Bibliography ==
- Christenhusz, Maarten J. M.; Fay, Michael F.; Chase, Mark W. (2017). "Lilkiales". Plants of the World: An Illustrated Encyclopedia of Vascular Plants. University of Chicago Press. pp. 141–150. ISBN 978-0-226-52292-0.
- Kubitzki, Klaus; Huber, Herbert, eds. (1998). The families and genera of vascular plants. Vol. 3. Flowering plants. Monocotyledons: Lilianae (except Orchidaceae). Berlin, Germany: Springer-Verlag. ISBN 978-3-540-64060-8., (additional excerpts)
- Moesbach, Ernesto Wilhelm de (1992). Botánica indígena de Chile (in Spanish). Andres Bello. ISBN 978-956-13-0970-8.
- Puga Borne, Federico (1921). "El chuno de ligtu". Revista chilena de historia natural. 25: 313–320.
