= Revista Chilena de Historia Natural =

- Discipline: Ecology, zoology, botany
- Language: English, Spanish
- Edited by: Patricio A. Camus

Publication details
- History: 1897–present
- Publisher: Sociedad de Biología de Chile (Chile)
- Frequency: Quarterly
- Open access: Yes

Standard abbreviations
- ISO 4: Rev. Chil. Hist. Nat.

Indexing
- ISSN: 0716-078X (print); 0717-6317 (web)
- OCLC no.: 54093357

Links
- Journal homepage; Online access through SciELO

The Revista Chilena de Historia Natural is a bilingual open access scientific journal published by the Sociedad de Biología de Chile covering research in many areas of biology. It was established in 1897 by Carlos Porter.

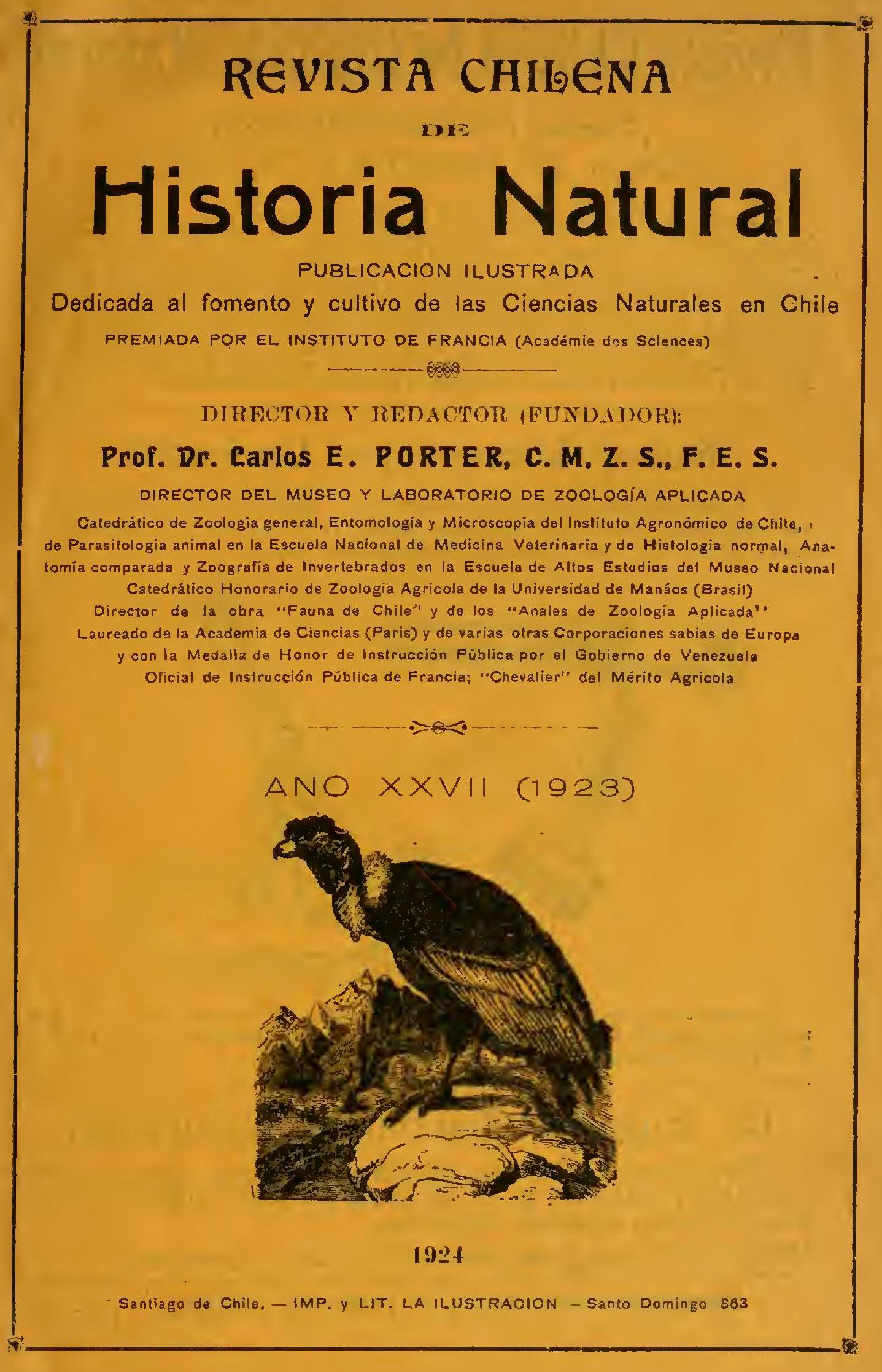
Cover of the 27th volume printed in 1924
