= Oromar Televisión =

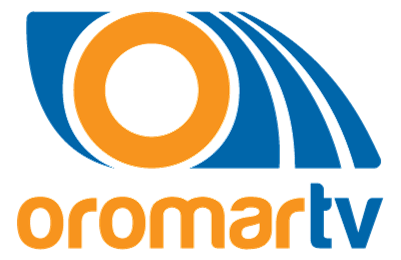
- Country: Ecuador
- Broadcast area: Ecuador

Programming
- Picture format: 480i SDTV

Ownership
- Owner: Sistemas Globales de Comunicación Hcglobal S.A.

History
- Launched: November 1, 2010

Links
- Website: www.oromartv.com

Oromar TV is an Ecuadorian television channel owned by Sistemas Globales de Comunicación Hcglobal S.A.; its programming is mostly general, but also broadcasts foreign telenovelas and TV series.

== History ==
Oromar TV started broadcasting in June 2010, as the first HD-ready television channel in Ecuador. Regular broadcasts began on November 1 of that year. At launch, the channel largely promoted Manta's business and tourism to Ecuador and the world. A year into its broadcasts, its local programming included the newscast Informar, celebrity interview program Fine with Nelly Pazmiño, Así se Hace Ecuador about national workers and music show Ondamar. Foreign programming included simulcasts of 'Al Rojo Vivo and Levántate.

Oromar suspended its regular broadcasts on March 25, 2012, for unknown reasons, but resumed a few weeks later on May 7. As of 2013, the channel was airing telenovelas such as Juanita la soltera and Prófugas del destino, Entrelíneas, with the candidates for the presidential elections, Venezuelan variety show 12 Corazones, the 1987 Teenage Mutant Ninja Turtles series, and others. In 2014, the channel aired the 2014 FIFA World Cup alongside Gama TV and TC. The channel aimed to compete with the national private channels with a regional output.

More recently (since at least 2020), the channel started airing Filipino telenovelas, which are distributed in the region by Latin Media. In February of that year, it was airing Legally Blind.

In October 2025, it started airing El Pescado Frito, the first Ecuadorian series to be constituted almost entirely by transgender actors.
