= Ocopa =

Peruvian food dish

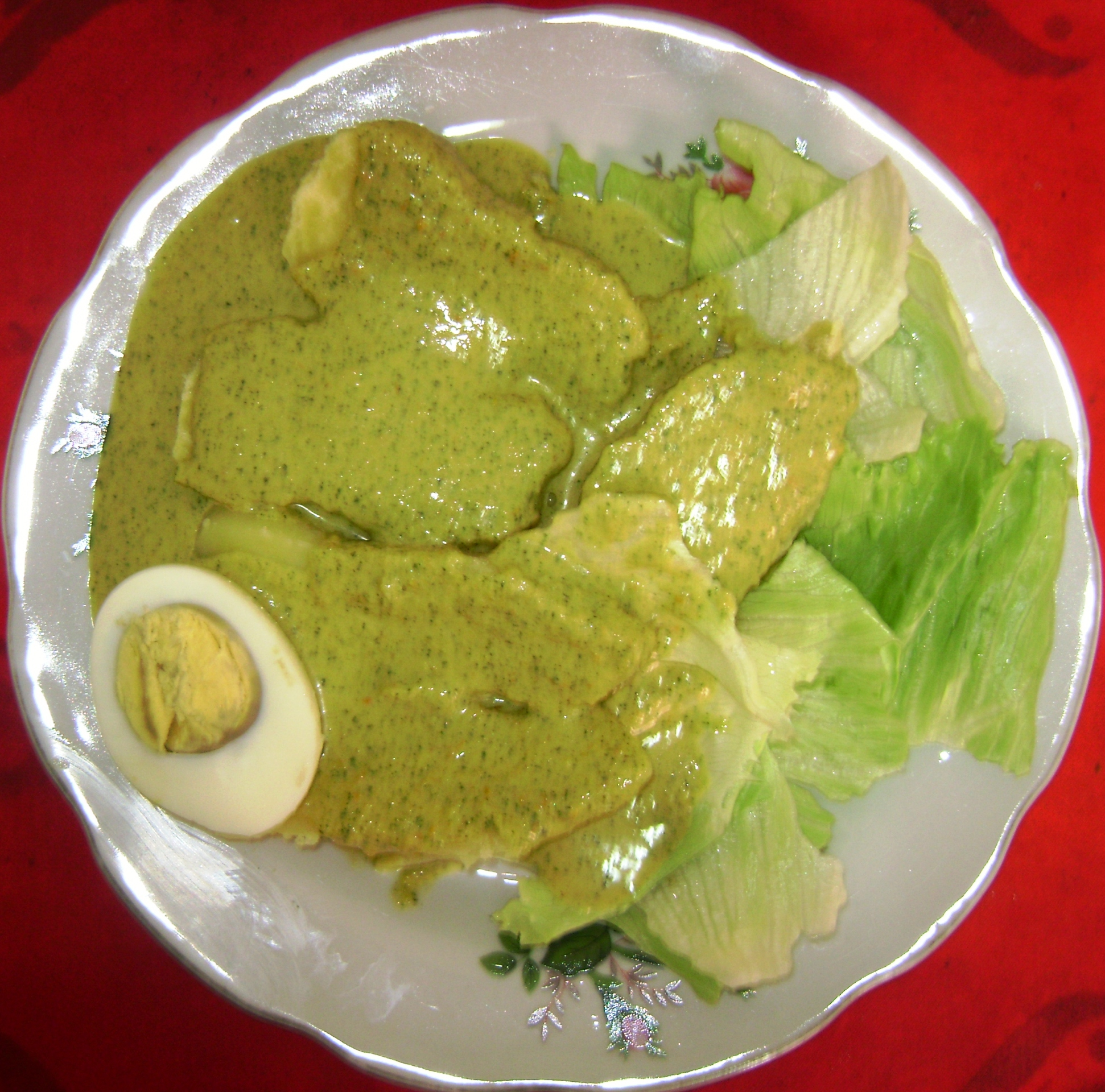
- Plate of ocopa
- Place of origin: Peru
- Region or state: Arequipa
- Main ingredients: sun-dried chilis, onions, and cracker meal

Ocopa is a smooth sauce flavored with black mint huacatay, originally from the city of Arequipa, Peru. It may be served hot, as dressing for boiled potatoes, or used as a garnish for cold hard-boiled eggs. Ocopa is prepared with sun-dried yellow chilis and sautéed onions, garlic, and thickened with crackers and roasted peanuts.

== Characteristic ==
The sauce is made with yellow pepper and mirasol pepper, both seared without seeds, onion and garlic also seared, evaporated milk, fresh cheese, crackers, peanuts, huacatay, salt and oil. All these ingredients are ground (traditionally in a fulling mill) or blended in such a way that they obtain a slightly pasty consistency and a characteristic color. The dish is decorated with a hard-boiled egg and a botija olive, in Arequipa it is normally accompanied by boiled potatoes or shrimp.
