= Stir-fried ice cream =

Ice cream dessert

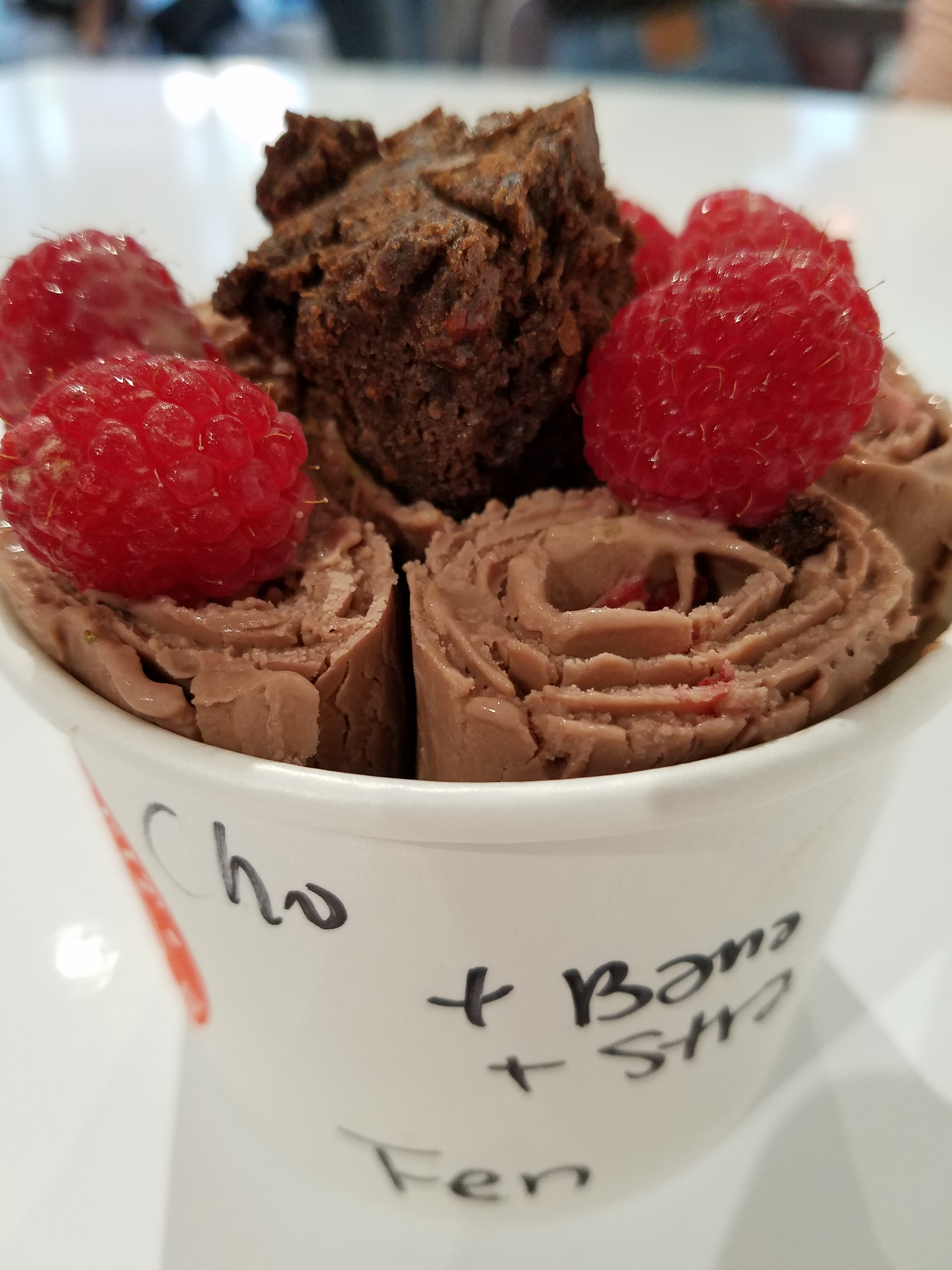
- Rolled ice cream with toppings
- Alternative names: Rolled ice cream
- Type: Ice cream
- Place of origin: Thailand
- Main ingredients: Milk

Stir-fried ice cream (Thai: ไอติมผัด, romanized: ai-tim phat or Thai: ไอศกรีมผัด, romanized: ai-sa-krim phat), also known as rolled ice cream or ice cream rolls, is a sweetened frozen dessert. It is made using milk, cream and sugars as well as other added ingredients to improve the flavor. The liquid mixture is stirred constantly to incorporate air spaces on an ice pan and simultaneously cooled to −30 °C (−22 °F) in a motion somewhat resembling stir frying. The completed rolling process results in rolls of smooth, semisolid ice cream or gelato. The rolls are placed in a vertical position in an ice cream cup, topped off with various toppings and decorations, and eaten with a spoon.

== Background ==
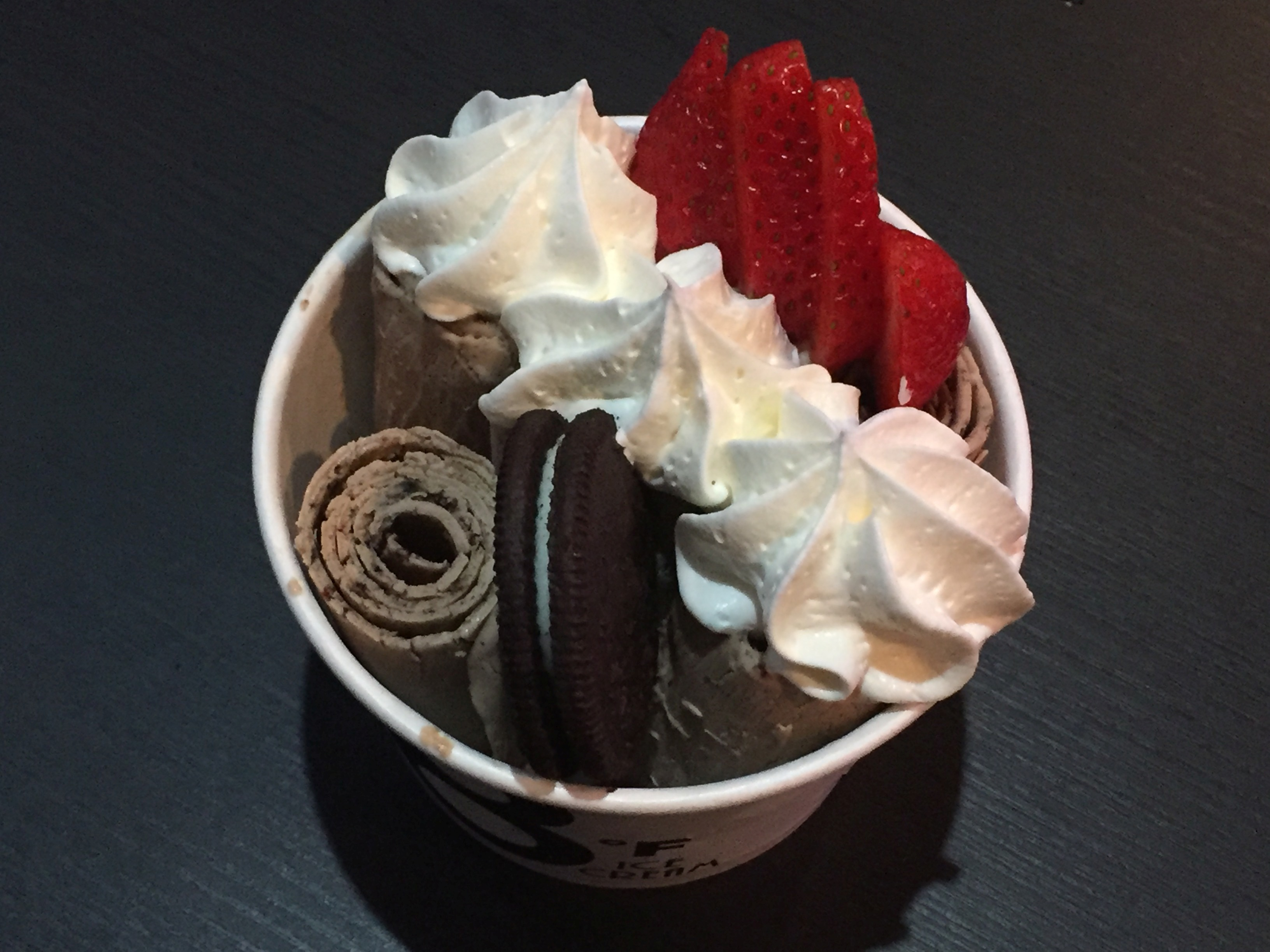
Stir-fried gelato

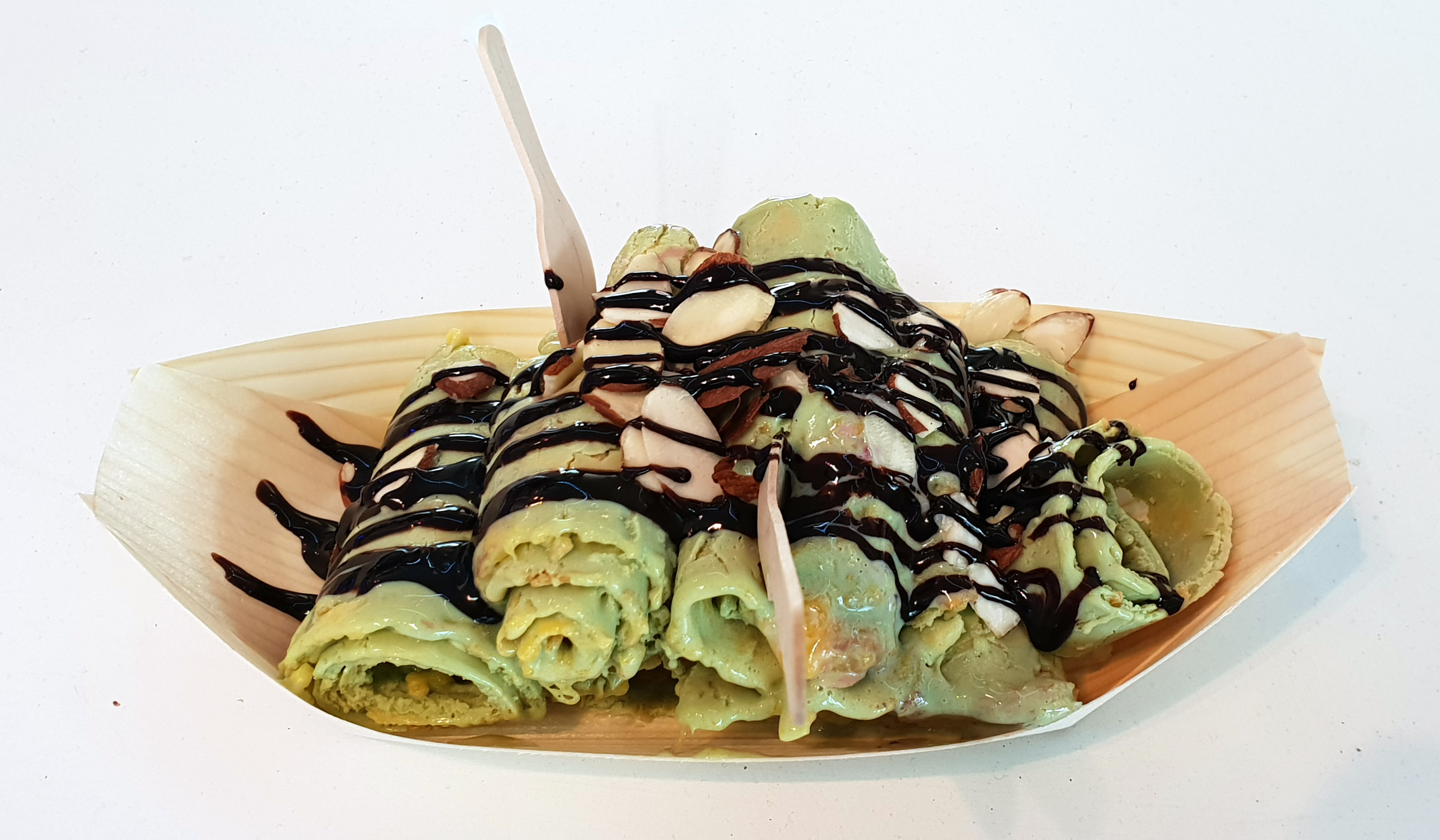
Rolled ice cream (matcha with mango and corn flakes) in Nelson, New Zealand

This frozen dessert originated in Thailand under the name "Thai rolled ice cream" or "stir-fried ice cream" (I-Tim-Pad). Beginning in Thailand in 2009 as a popular street food, this dessert spread into neighboring countries and became a popular style of ice cream by 2012. Customers began to record the process of the "rolled" or stir-fried ice cream or gelato being made and would put it on the internet. These videos became popular and other countries started to pick up on this trend. This dessert is popular among children and adults. Customers have noted that lines can take over an hour to order in large metropolitan areas such as New York and Boston.

== Preparation ==
The product is made with a milk base combined with various fresh ingredients and different toppings served alongside this dessert. The main ingredients include the liquid base, which is commonly milk or soy milk and comes in generic flavors, such as vanilla, chocolate, coffee, and strawberry. The base flavor could be left as is, or extra ingredients can be added, such as fruit, cookies, chocolate, and brownies. These ingredients plus extract powder or syrups are used to create the flavor.

== Process ==
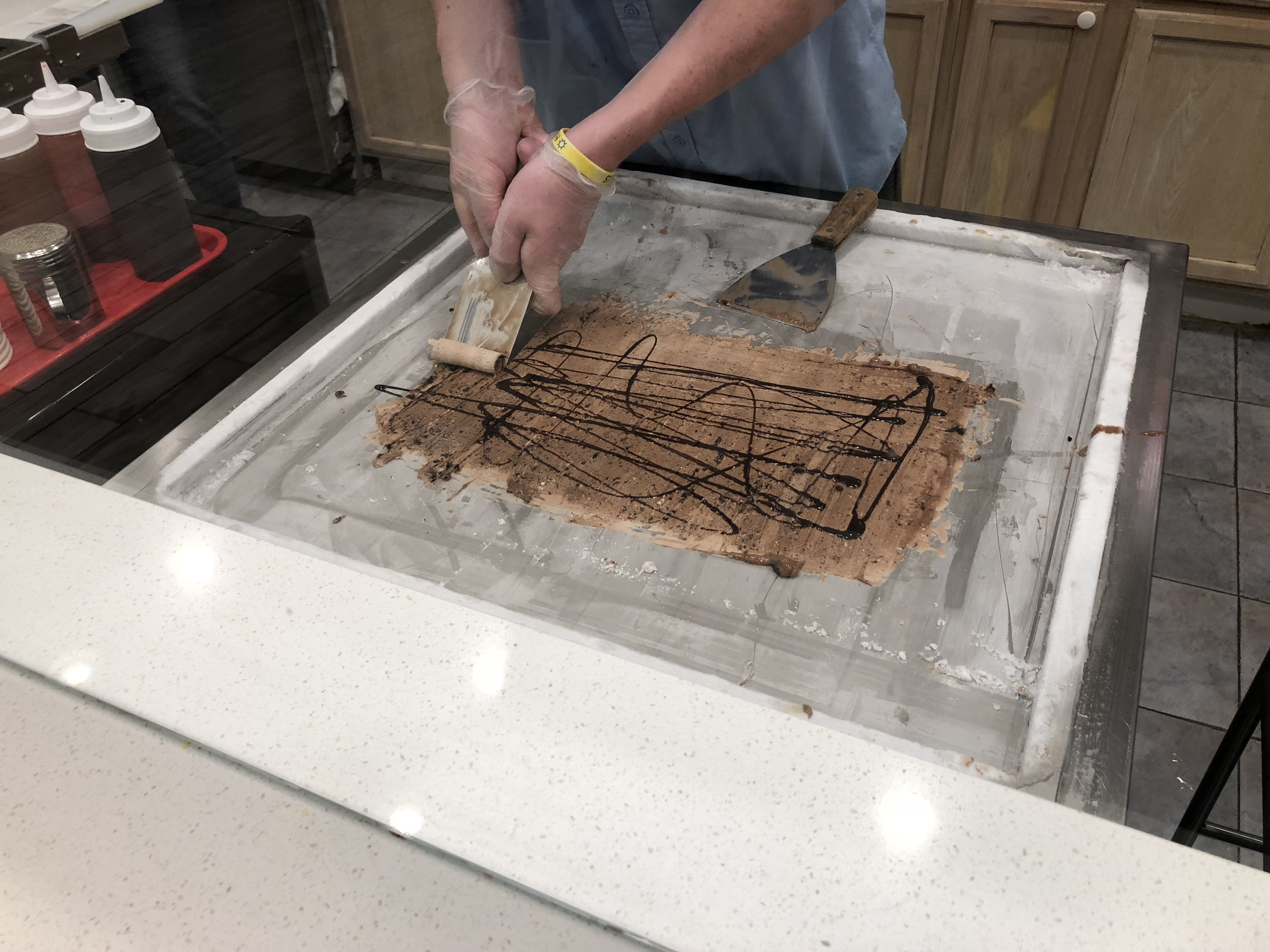
Stir-fried ice cream being prepared on an ice pan

The process to create stir-fried ice cream takes an average of two minutes. The flavored milk-based liquid is poured onto the ice pan, a freezing-cold stainless steel surface that is chilled by a refrigeration unit, where it is chopped and manipulated until the liquid becomes a cream. Other required ingredients are added and the mixture is chopped and probed until a creamy texture has formed. The mixture is spread in a thin layer across the pan, then starting on one side the ice cream or gelato is rolled into its cylinder shape with the use of a spatula. The rolls are placed in an ice cream cup and decorated with any desired toppings.
