= Chairo (stew) =

Traditional soup in South America

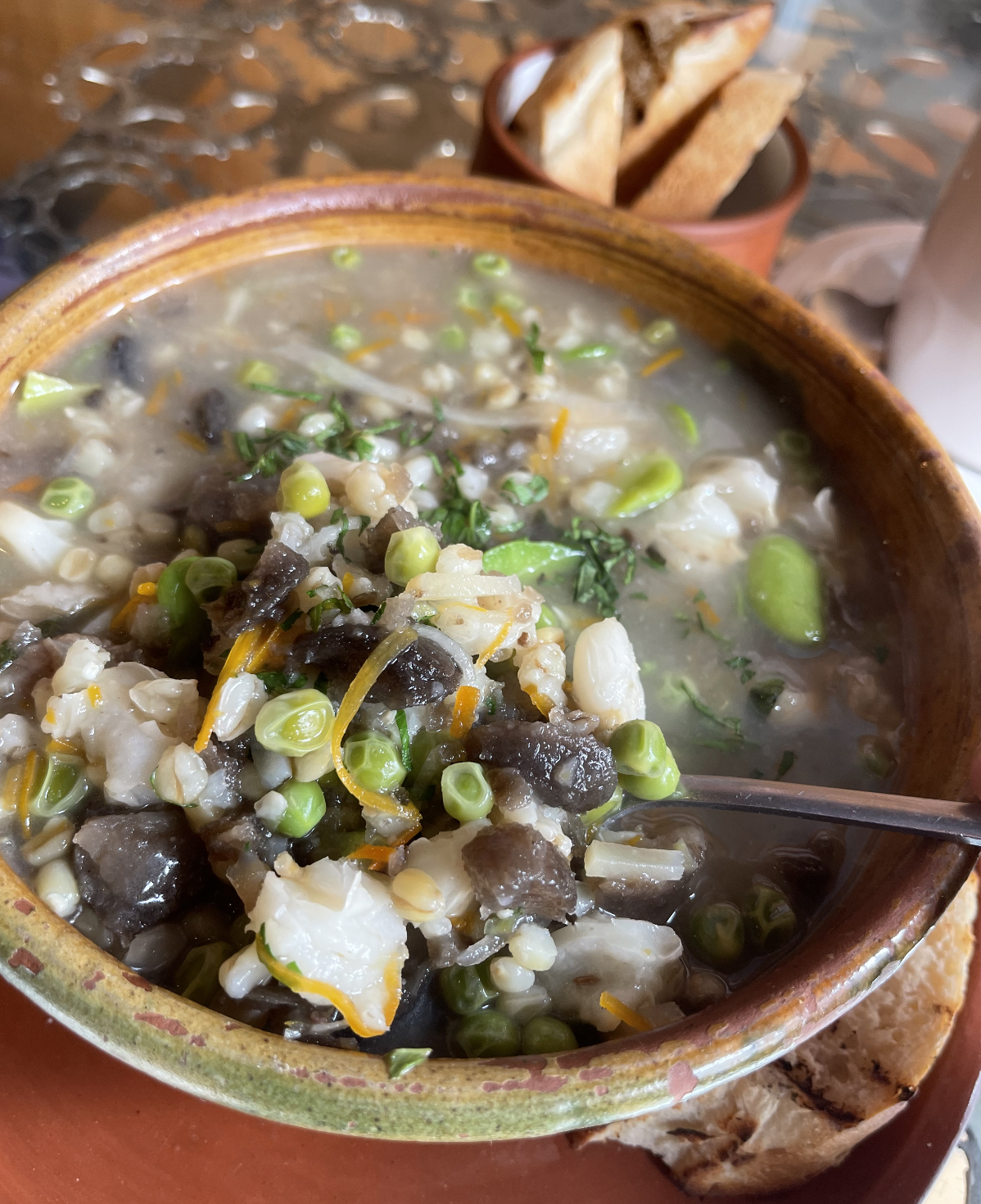
- Chairo stew as served at Ciclik, a restaurant in the Sopocachi neighborhood of La Paz, Bolivia
- Type: Soup
- Place of origin: Bolivia, northern Chile
- Created by: Aymara people
- Serving temperature: Hot
- Main ingredients: Chuños, onions, carrots, potatoes, white corn, beef and wheat kernels

Chairo is a traditional dish of the Aymara people, consumed mainly in Bolivia and other countries in the Andes.

It is a soup made of vegetables and beef. It is made of chuño (dehydrated potatoes), onions, carrots, potatoes, white corn, peas, fava beans, a small piece of châlona (dehydrated lamb or llama meat), beef, and wheat kernels; sometimes a small piece of pork rind is placed on top. It also contains herbs such as coriander and spices. It is native to the region of La Paz. It is also very popular in the Peruvian Altiplano, forming an important part of the gastronomy of the Puno Region.

== See also ==
- Chilean cuisine
- List of beef dishes
- List of stews
