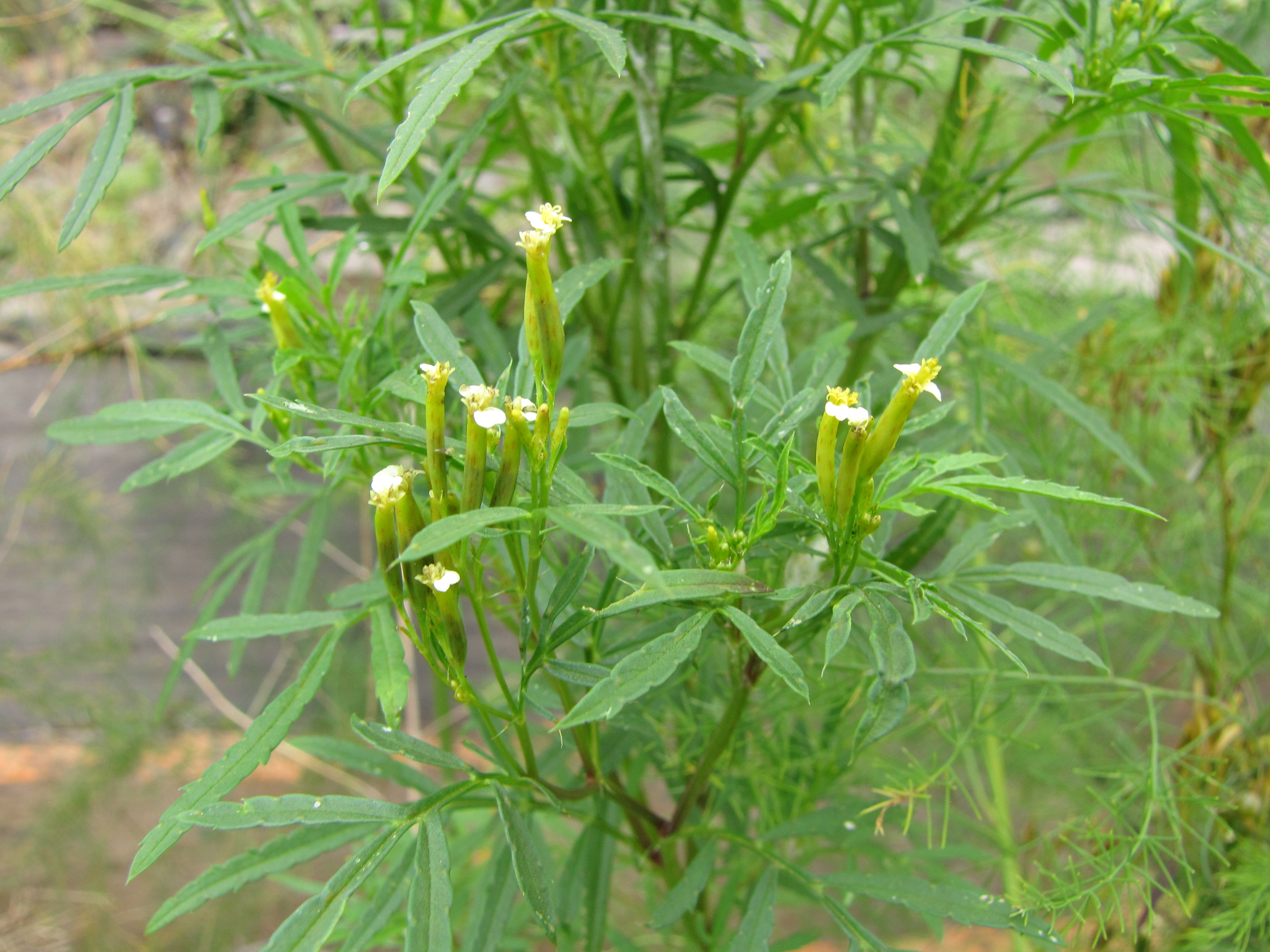

Scientific classification
- Kingdom: Plantae
- Clade: Tracheophytes
- Clade: Angiosperms
- Clade: Eudicots
- Clade: Asterids
- Order: Asterales
- Family: Asteraceae
- Genus: Tagetes
- Species: T. minuta

Binomial name
- Tagetes minuta L.

Synonyms
- Tagetes bonariensis Pers.; Tagetes glandulifera Schrank; Tagetes glandulosa Schrank ex Link; Tagetes porophyllum Vell.; Tagetes tinctoria Hornsch.

= Tagetes minuta =

Species of flowering plant

Tagetes minuta is a tall upright marigold type of plant from the genus Tagetes, with small flowers, native to the south western half of South America. Since Spanish colonization, it has been introduced around the world, and has become naturalized in Europe, Asia, Australasia, North America, and Africa. Tagetes minuta has numerous local names that vary by region. In the Andes it is known as Huacatay or Wacatay, and in other regions it is common as chinchilla, chiquilla, chilca, zuico, suico, or anisillo. Other names include Muster John Henry, southern marigold, khakibos, stinking roger, wild marigold, and black mint. It is called the Quechua terms huacatay in Peru or wakataya in Bolivia.

It is used as a culinary herb in Peru, Ecuador, and parts of Chile and Bolivia. It is commonly sold in Latin grocery stores in a bottled, paste format as black mint paste.

== Description ==
This species of marigold may grow to become from 0.6–2 meters tall.

== Uses ==
Tagetes minuta has been eaten in various forms since pre-Columbian times. Dried leaves may be used as a seasoning and huacatay paste is used to make the popular Peruvian potato dish called ocopa. An herbal tea can be brewed from the leaves. An extraction of the plant, "Marigold oil", is used in the perfume, tobacco, and soft drink industry.

In addition to food, the plant can be used to produce dye, and as a green manure crop for biomass and a bio-fumigant for control of selected species of nematodes.

== Toxicity ==
The oils contained in the oil glands that are found throughout the above ground portions of the plant may cause irritation to the skin and in some cases are said to cause photodermatitis.

== Gallery ==
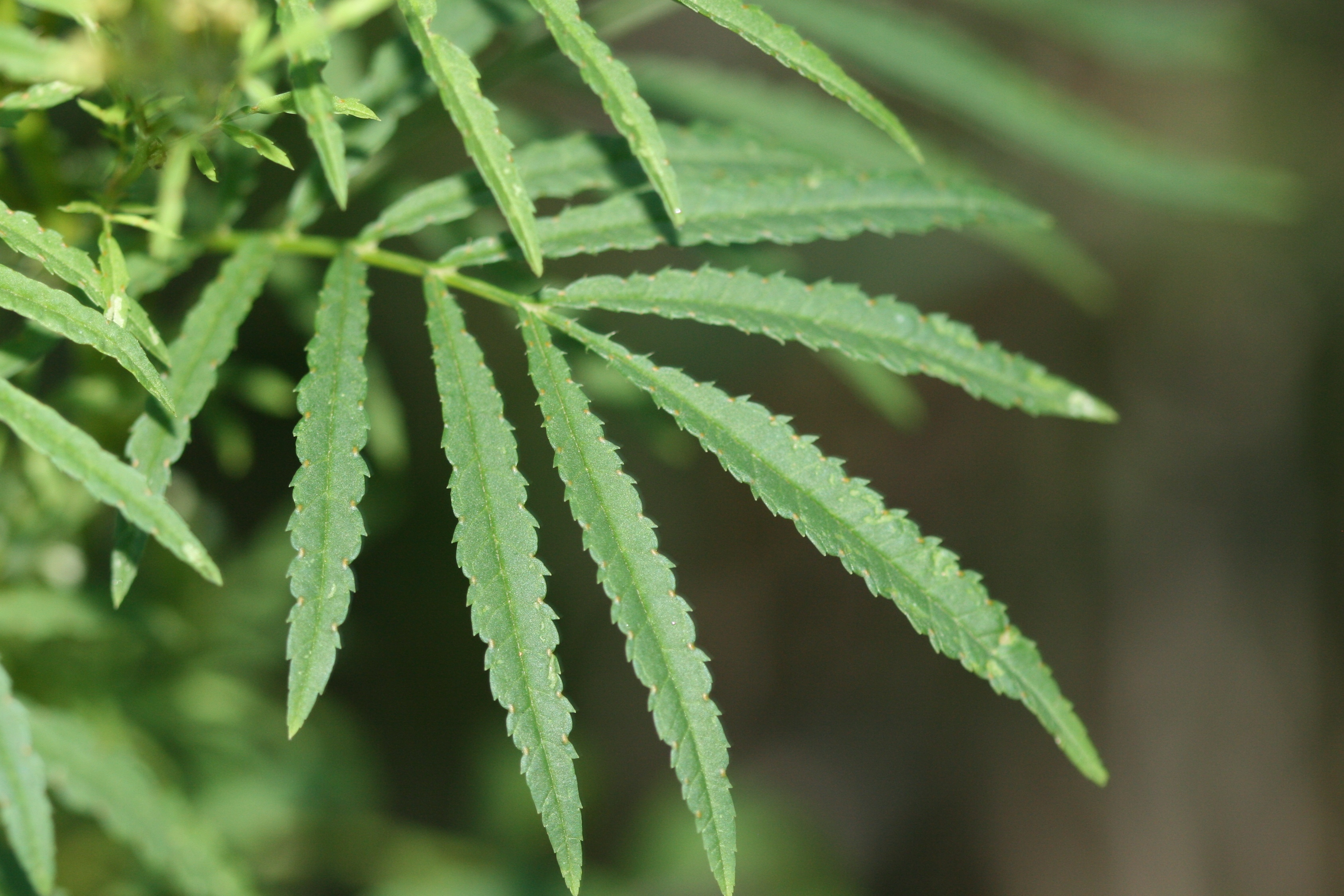
Close-up of pinnate leaf

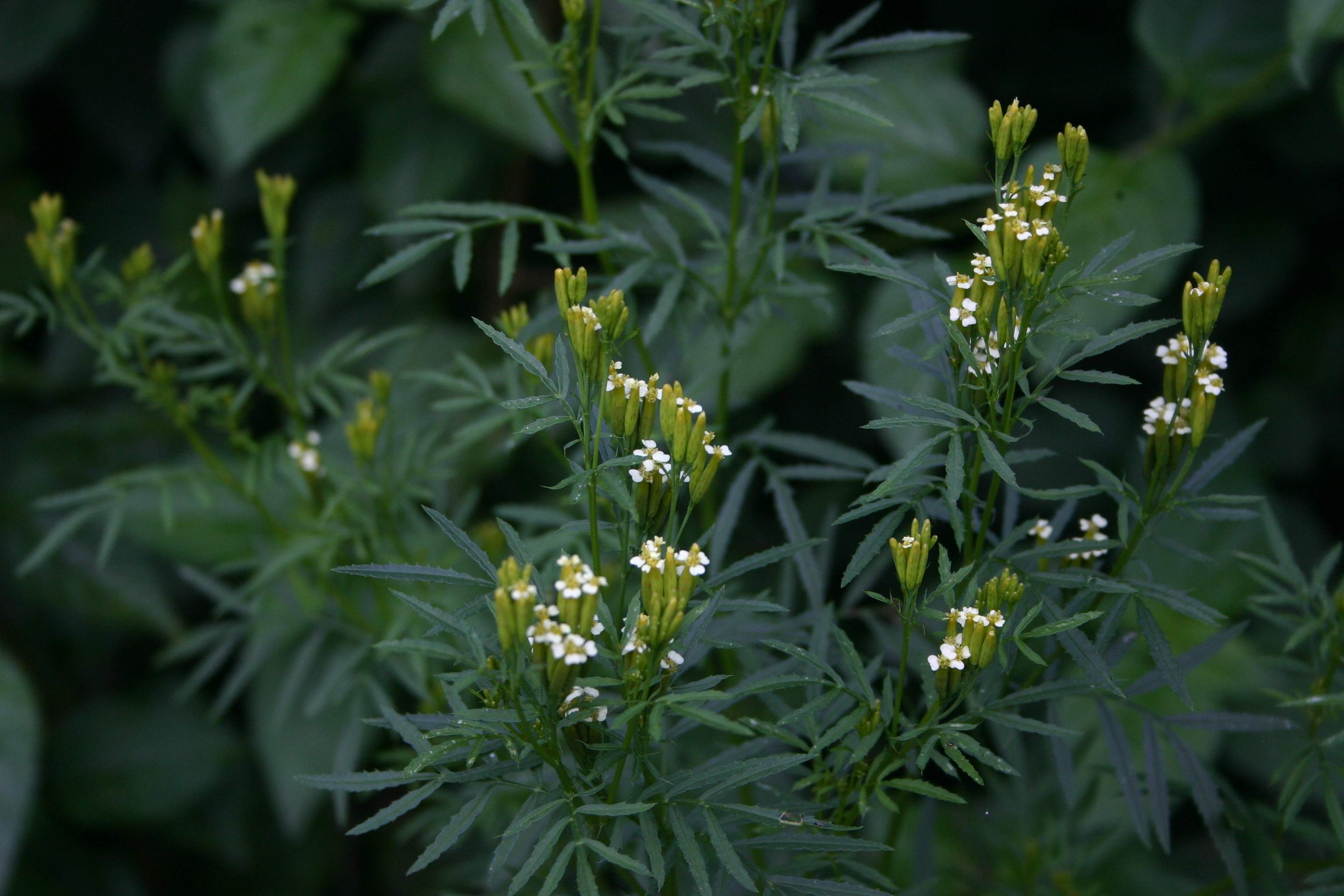
Wakatay in flower

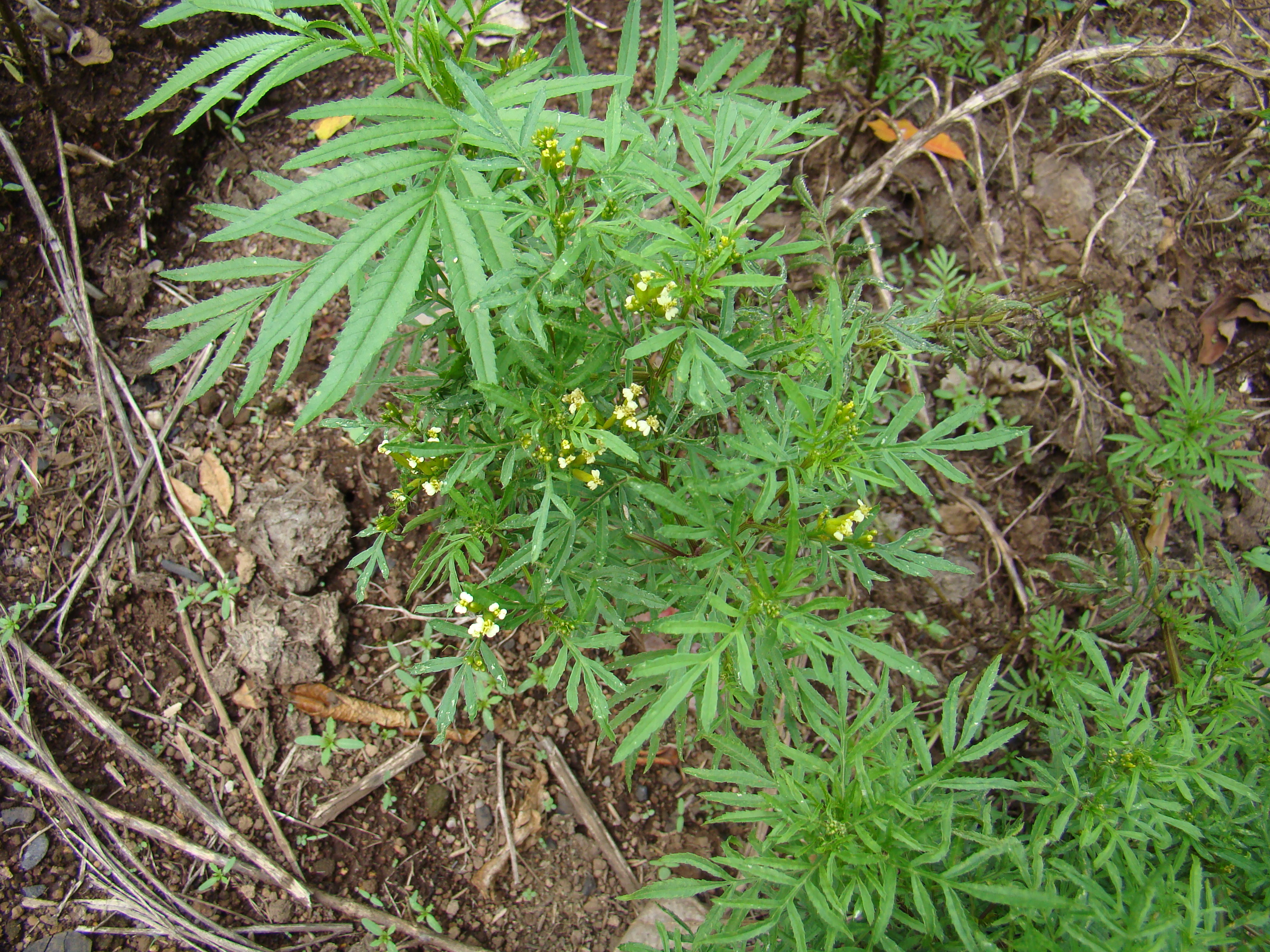
Kawunyira at Entebbe, Uganda

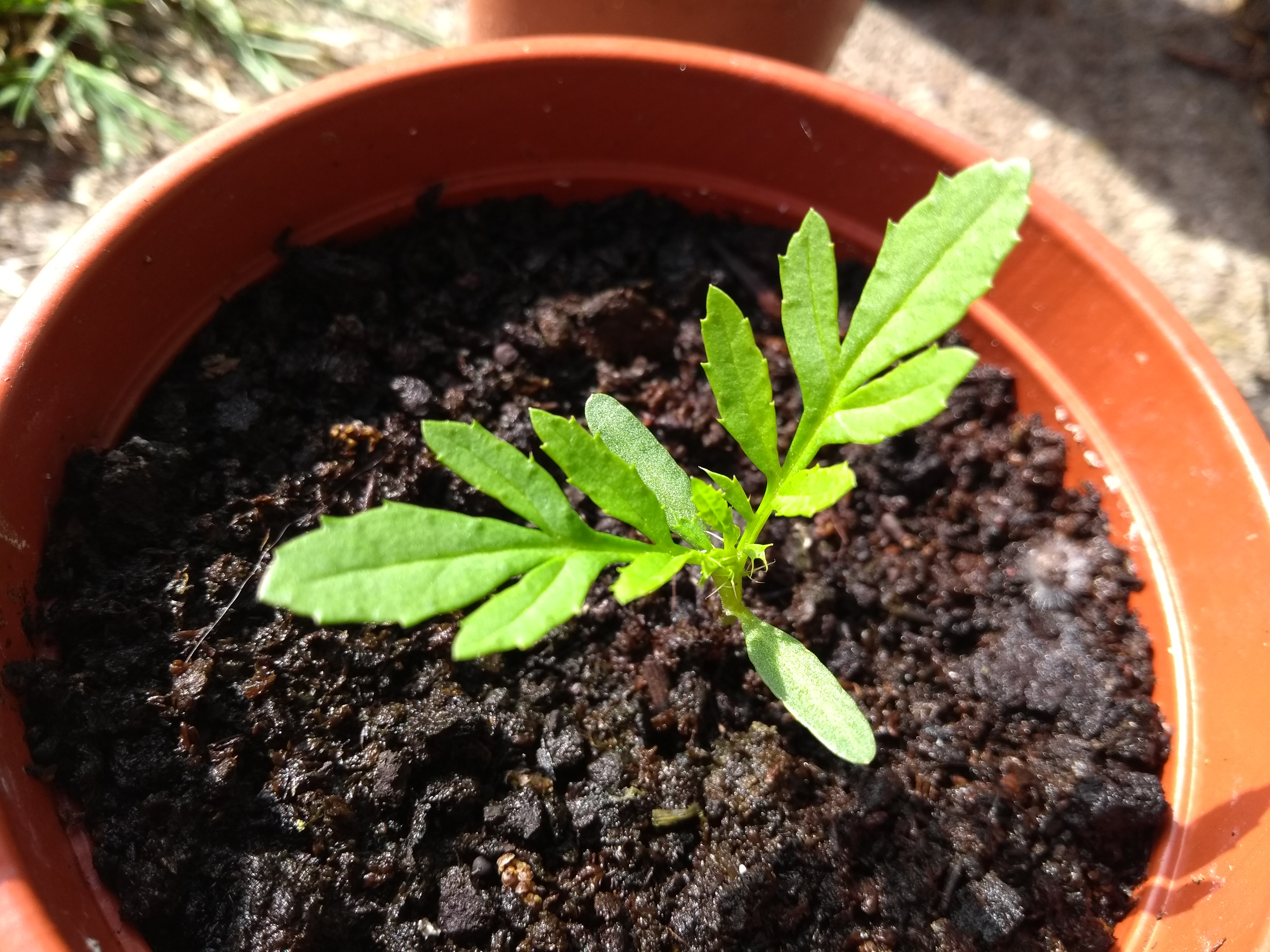
Peruvian black mint seedling

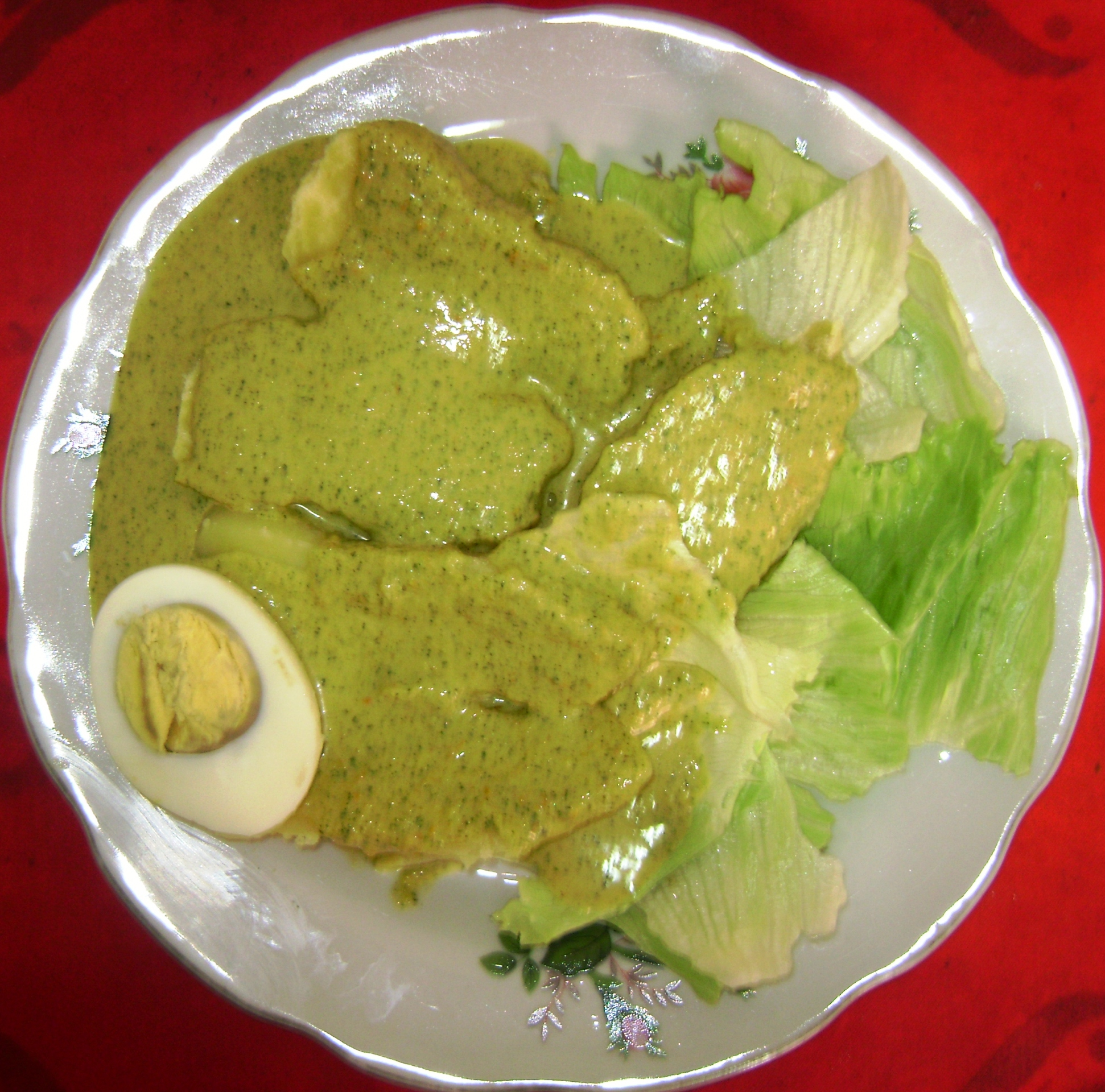
Ocopa

== See also ==
- Peruvian huacatay
