= List of maize dishes =

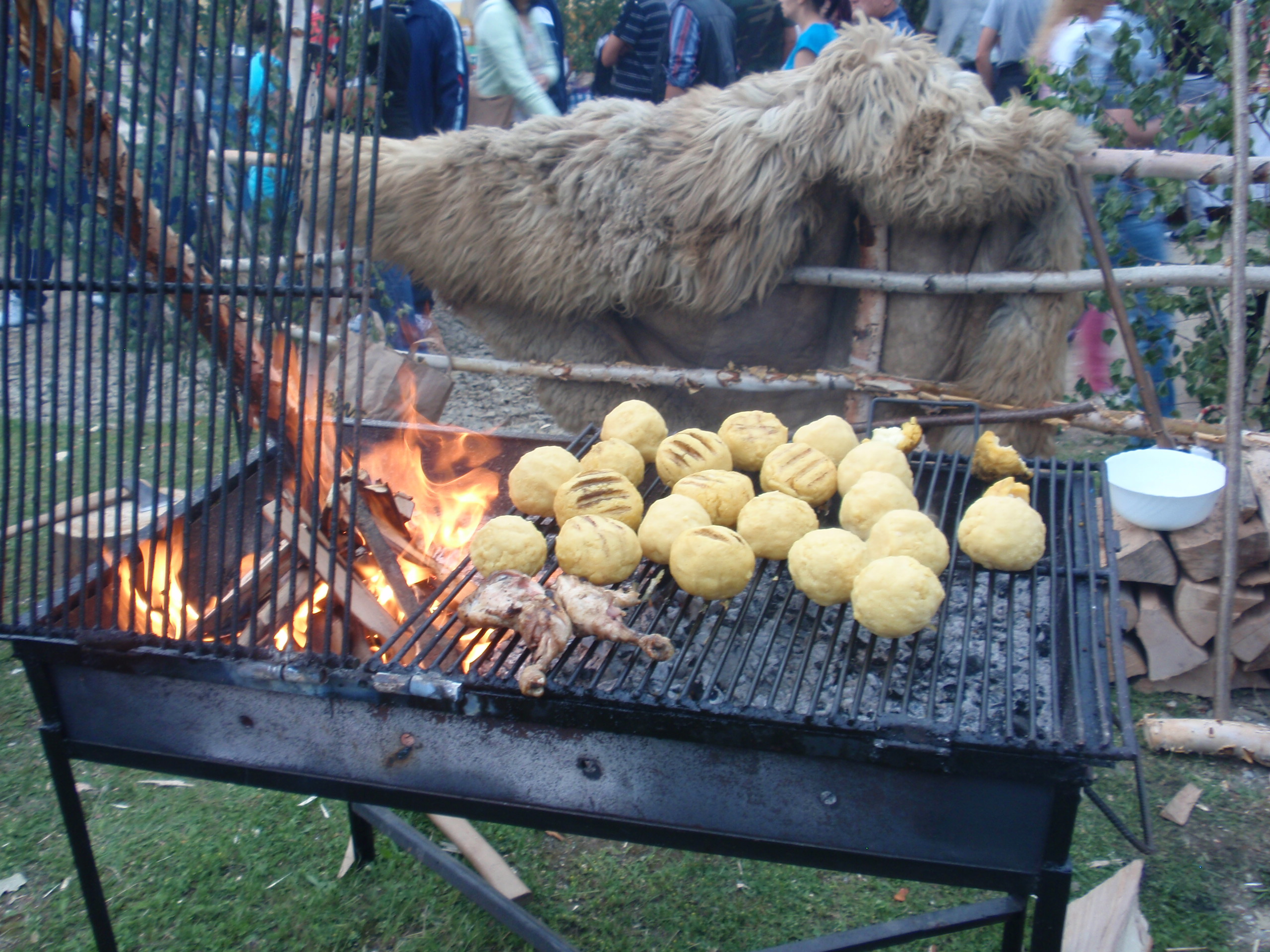
Cocoloşi cooking on a grill

This is a list of corn dishes, in which maize (corn) is used as a primary ingredient. Additionally, some foods and beverages that are prepared with maize are listed.

== Ingredients ==
Corn can be processed into an intermediate form to be cooked further. These processes include drying, milling, and nixtamalization.

- Boota copassa, a Chickasaw word meaning 'cold flour'. It consists of parched and pounded zea (maize) before it reaches maturity. A small quantity of meal is thrown into cold water, where it boils and swells as much as common meal boiled over fire.
- Cornmeal – Meal (coarse flour) ground from dried maize
- Corn oil – Oil from the seeds of corn
- Corn starch
- Corn steep liquor – By-product of corn wet-milling
- Corn syrup – Syrup made from corn used as food additive
  - Glucose syrup – Syrup made from the hydrolysis of starch
  - High-fructose corn syrup – Processed corn syrup
  - High-maltose corn syrup – Food additive
- Masa – Corn dough used in Latin American dishes
- Mielie-meal – Coarse maize flour, mainly used in Africa
- Samp – Preparation of dried corn from Africa

== Foods ==
=== Soups, stews, and porridge ===
Corn, in the form of cornmeal or kernels of fresh sweet corn, can be boiled or stewed.

- Akple – Staple food of Ghana
- Amiwo – Beninese porridge
- Banku – Staple food of Ghana
- Bulz – Romanian dish of roasted polenta and cheese
- Cachupa - Cape Verdean stew of corn, beans, meat or fish
- Canjica – Variety of corn typical of Brazilian cuisine
- Cocoloși – Romanian dish of grilled corn porridge
- Corn chowder – Creamy corn soup from the United States
- Corn crab soup – Chinese soup of corn and crab meat
- Corn pudding – Thick stewed corn dish from the Southern United States
- Corn soup – Soup made with corn
- Corn stew – Thick stew made with maize
- Cou-cou – Caribbean dish of cornmeal and okra
- Funche – Puerto Rican cornmeal porridge
- Creamed corn – American corn dish with thick, soupy consistency
- Fufu – Dough-like food in African cuisine
- Ginataang mais – Filipino sweet corn and rice gruel
- Grits – Porridge of boiled cornmeal
- Hasty pudding – Type of pudding or porridge
- Kačamak – Maize porridge from the Balkans
- Kānga pirau – Māori dish made of stepped fermented kernels, from New Zealand
- Mămăligă – Traditional dish from yellow maize flour
- Mămăligă în pături – Romanian layered dish
- Mămăligă with milk (usually, of cow, but also of sheep or goat), as the first course, and mămăligă with cheese and sour cream (or yoghurt), with a touch of salt (if preferred), as the second course – Romanian dishes for the poor, served usually on Friday and at lunch
- Milho Frito – Portuguese fried cornmeal dish
- Mush – Boiled cornmeal pudding
- Ogi (food) – Cereal pudding in Nigeria
- Pashofa – Chickasaw and Choctaw white corn soup
- Patasca - Peruvian hominy and meat soup
- Polenta – Italian porridge, usually of cornmeal
- Pozole – Mexican hominy and meat soup
- Sagamite – American stew
- Succotash – Traditional American food
- Suam na mais – Filipino corn soup with pork or shrimp
- Ugali – Type of maize meal made in Africa
- Xarém – Portuguese corn meal soup
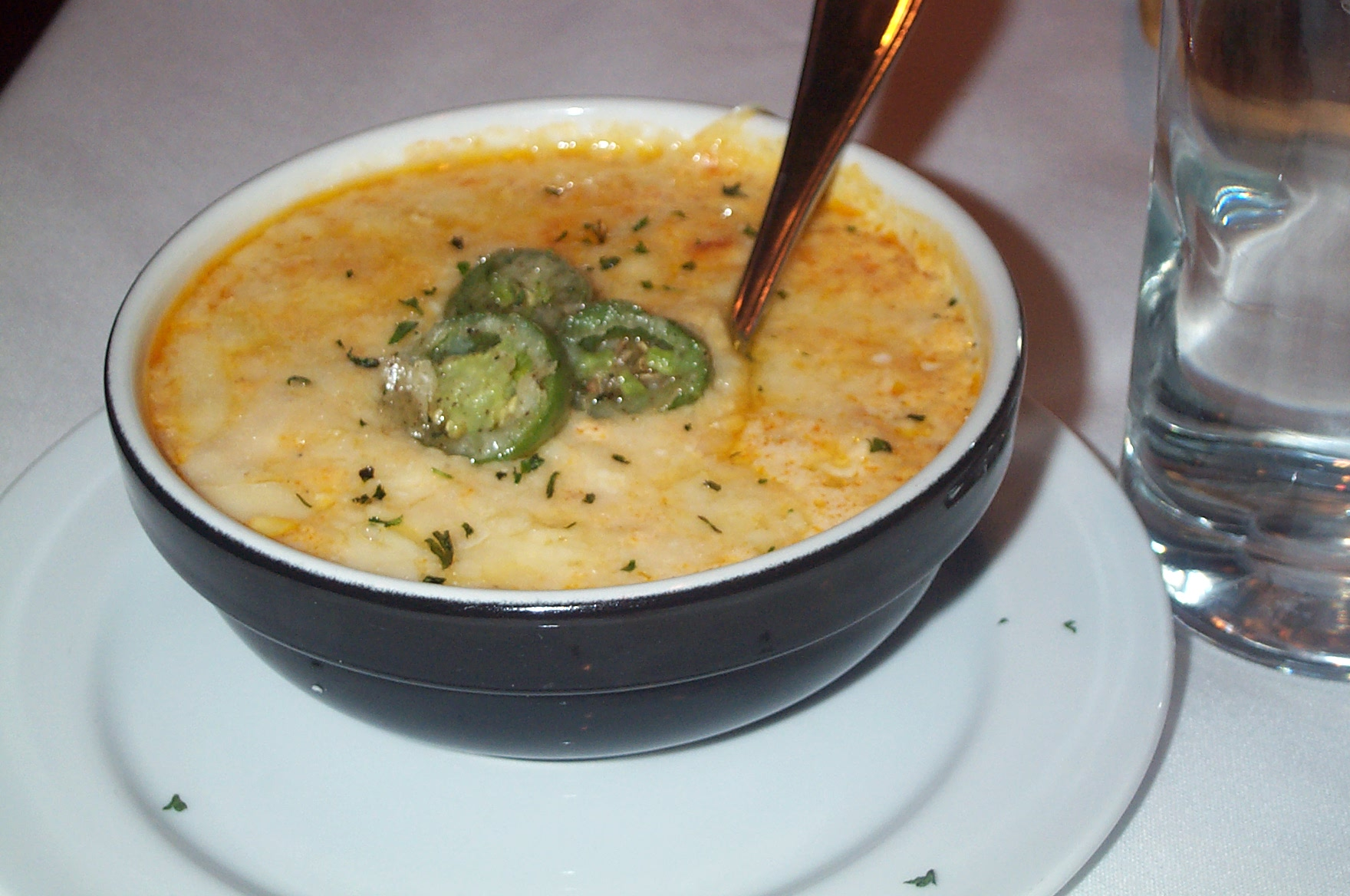
Creamed corn is a soup or sauce made by pulping the corn kernels and collecting the milky residue from the corn.

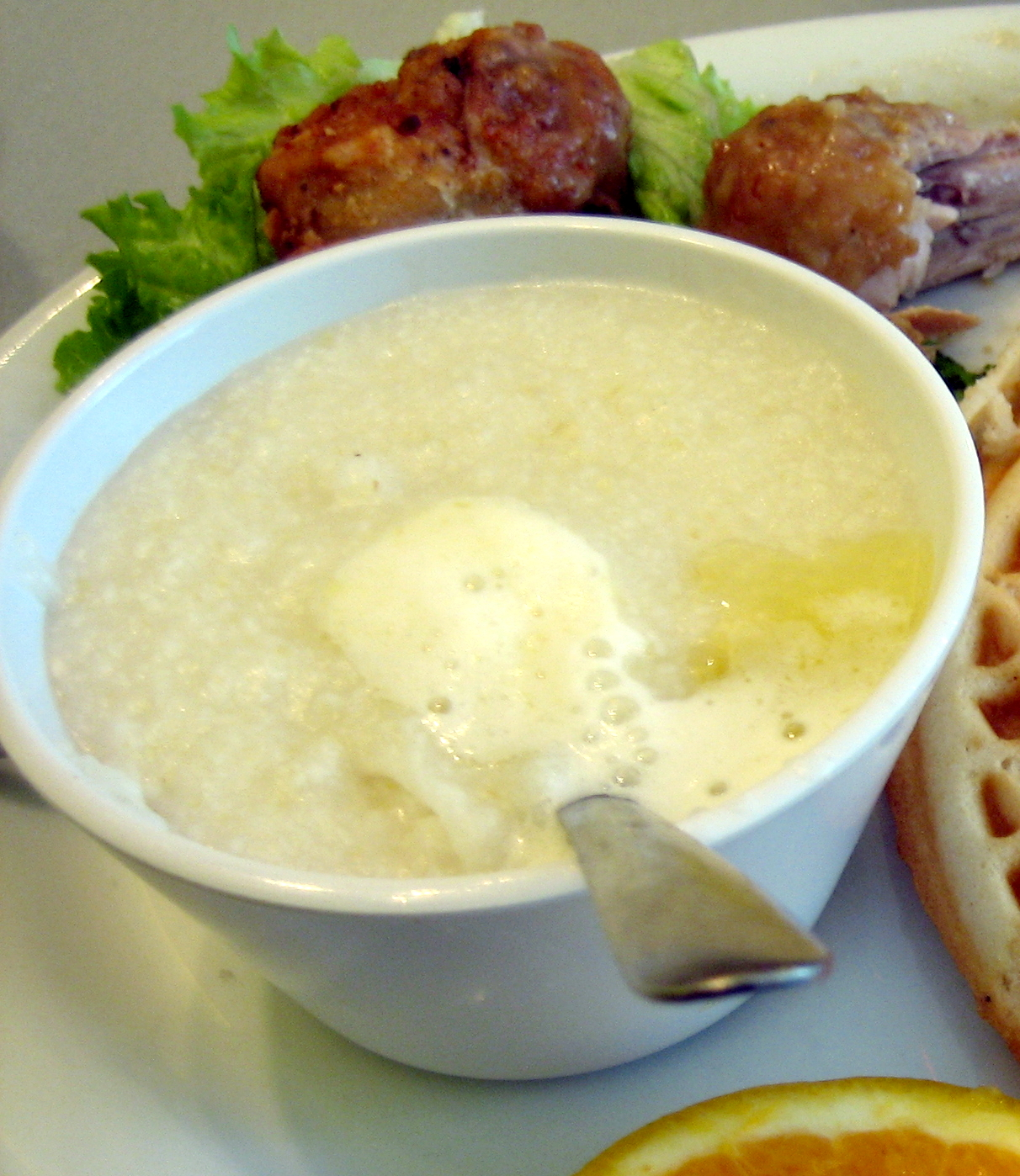
Grits is a ground-corn food of Native American origin, that is common in the Southern United States and eaten mainly at breakfast.

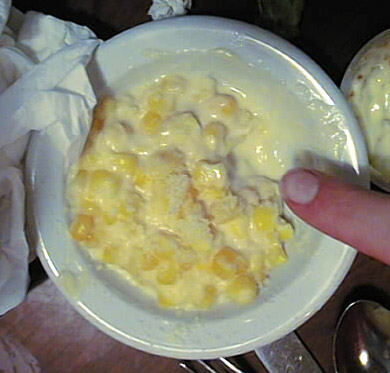
Corn pudding is prepared from stewed corn, water, any of various thickening agents, and optional additional flavoring or texturing ingredients.

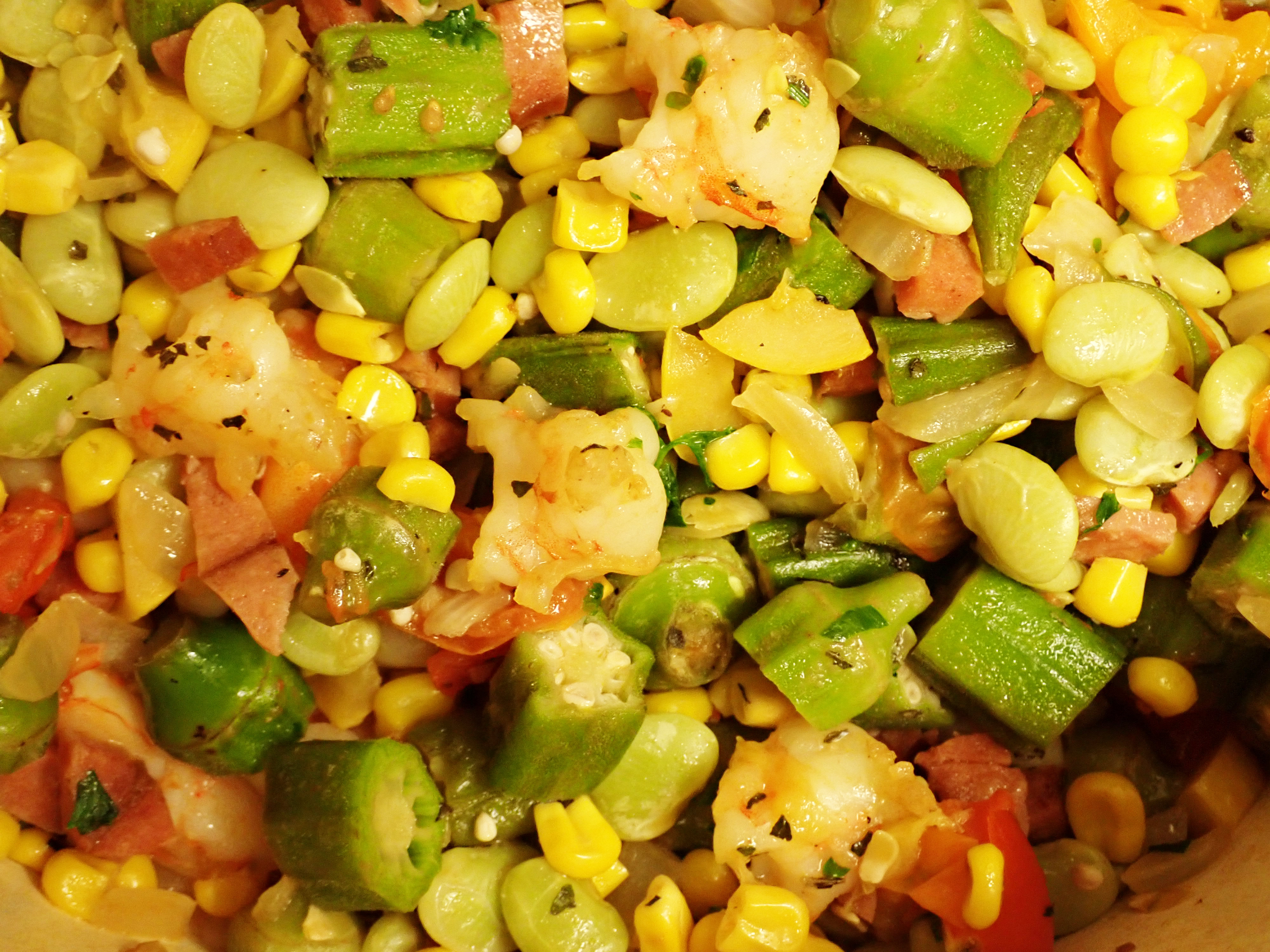
Sweet corn is a principle ingredient of succotash

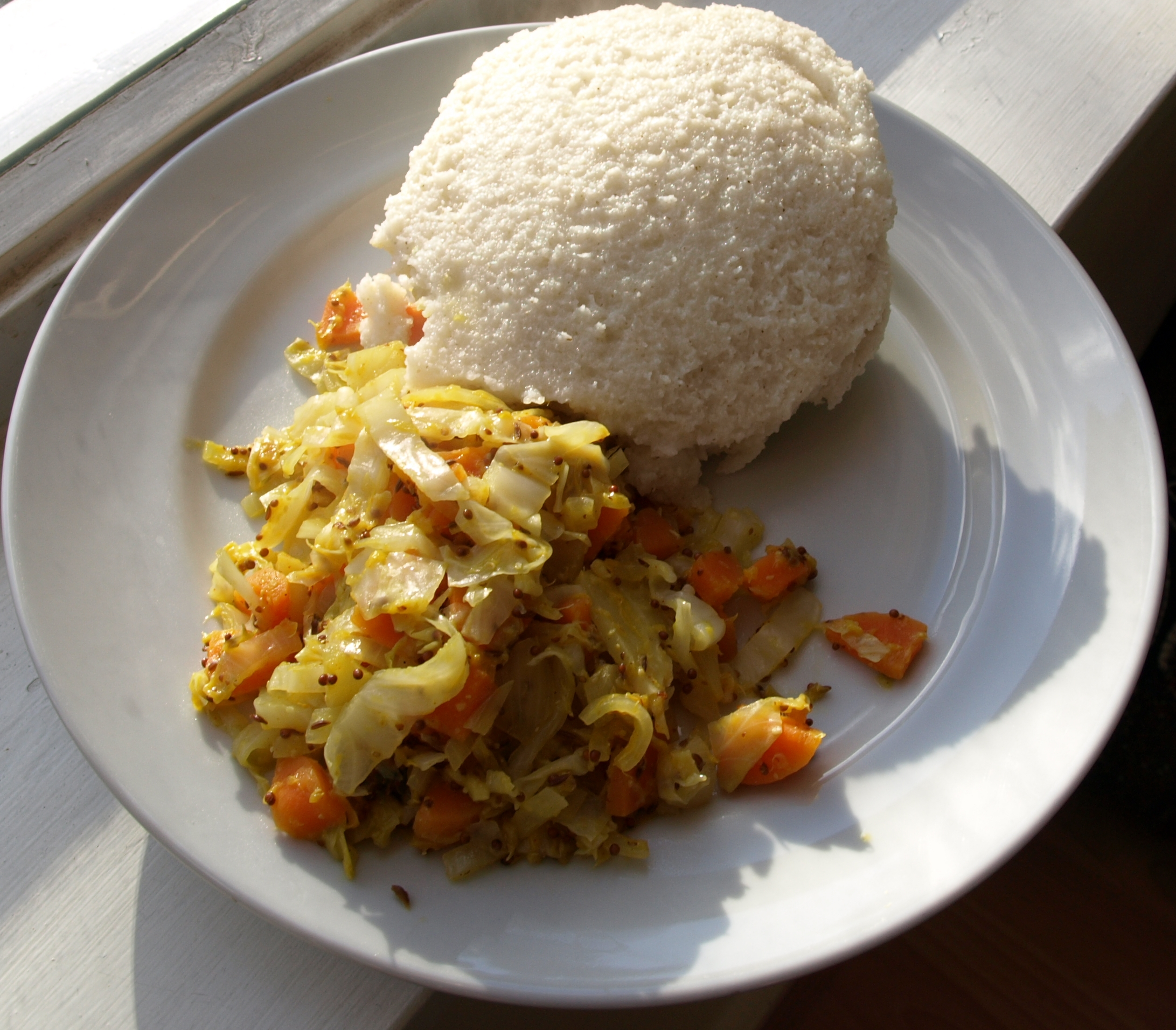
Ugali (top), also known as pap, with cooked cabbage and vegetables

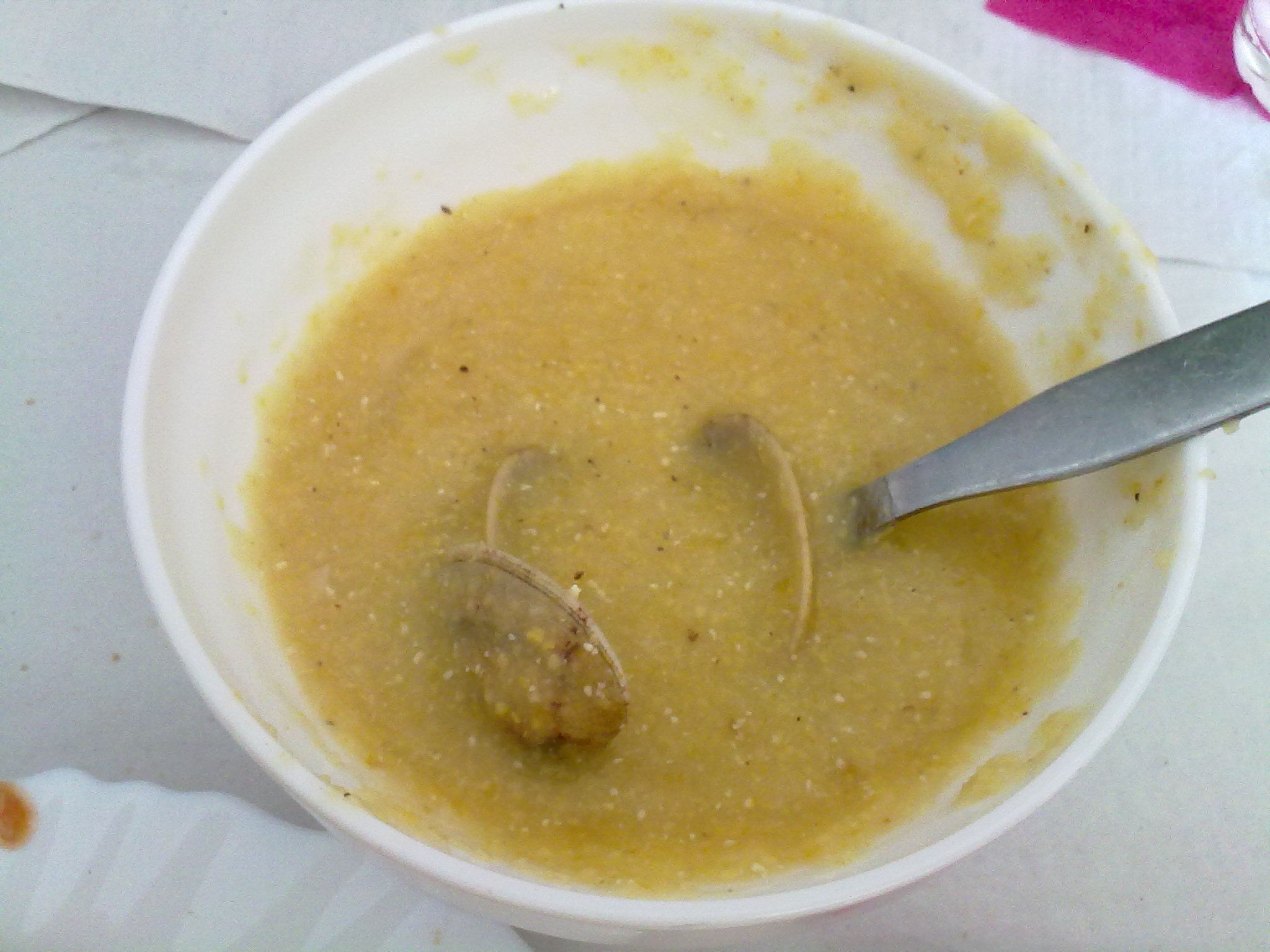
Xarém, a dish from the Algarve, Portugal

=== Tamales and related ===
Tamales are a dish of nixtamalized maize that is ground, wrapped in a corn husk, and steamed. Tamales originated in Mesoamerica as early as 8000 to 5000 BC. There are many regional variants and related dishes.

- Acaçá – Maize dish in Brazil
- Tamal – Traditional Mesoamerican dish
- Binaki – Filipino corn tamale
- Guanime – Puerto Rican dish
- Hallaca – Dish from Venezuela
- Humita – Pre-Hispanic steamed corn dish in South America
- Nacatamal – Nicaraguan nixtamalized corn dish
- Pamonha – Traditional Brazilian food
- Pasteles – Caribbean and Latin American dish
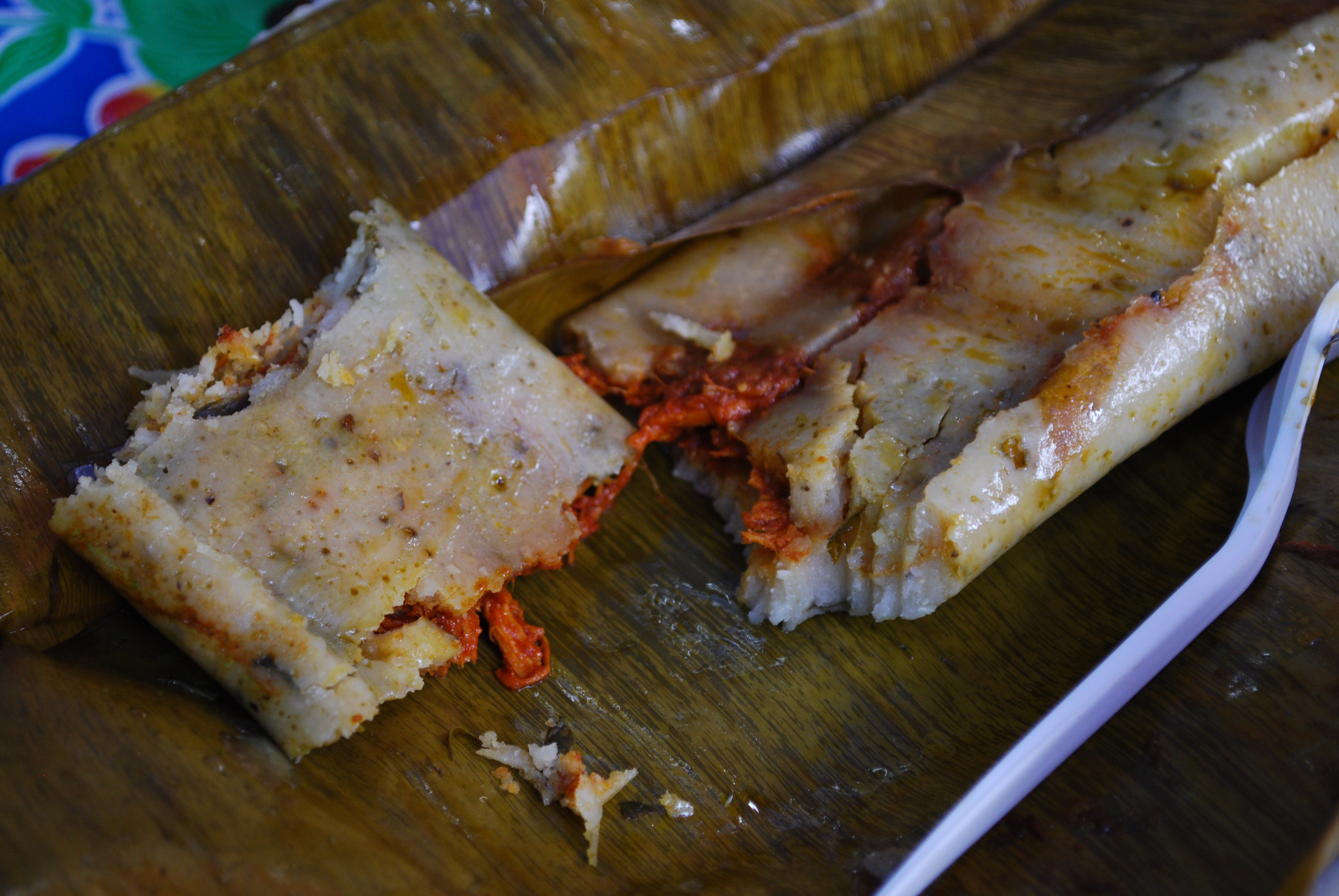
Tamales from Chiapas, Mexico

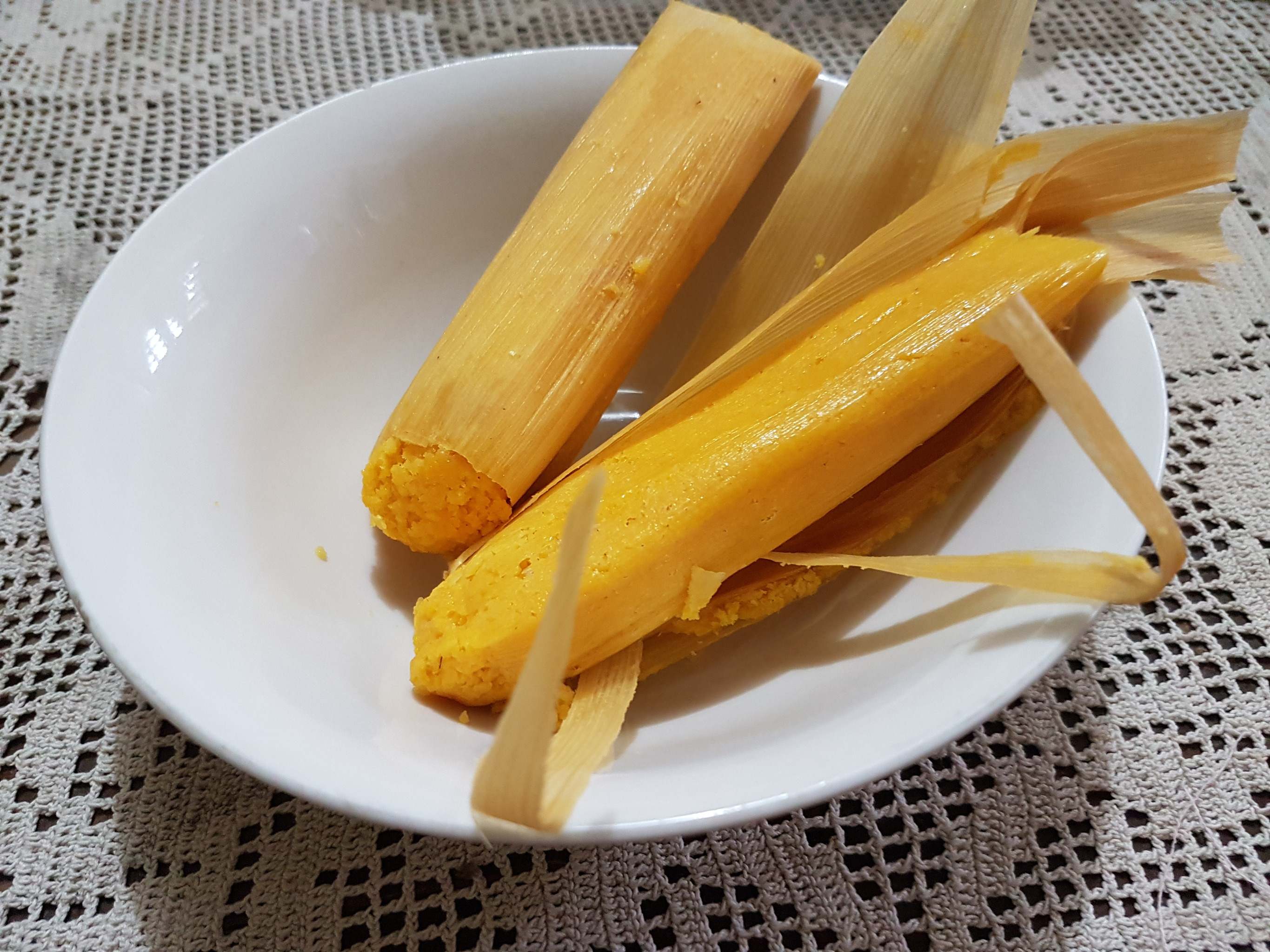
Steamed cornmeal Binaki from the Philippines

=== Breads and cakes ===
Baked and steamed breads and cakes can be made using corn, often as a flour.

- Arepa – South American corn flatbread
- Bollo – Latin-American corn bun
- Bolo de fubá – Brazilian maize flour cake
- Broa – Type of bread
- Cachapa – Corn pancake from Venezuela
- Chipa guasu – Paraguayan savory corn cake
- Cobu – Brazilian dessert
- Corn cookie – Baked good made from corn, often sweet
- Corn tortilla – Unleavened flatbread made from nixtamalized maize
- Cornbread – American bread made with cornmeal
- Gordita – Mexican dish of masa stuffed with cheese, meat, or other fillings
- Huarache (food) – Mexican maize dish
- Johnnycake – American cornmeal flatbread
- Makki di roti – Cornmeal flatbread from South Asia
- Mălai dulce AKA pollenta orange cake – traditional Romanian corn cake and dessert, from the Transylvania region
- Manuê – Varieties of Brazilian cakes
- Pastel de choclo – Traditional South American corn dish
- Piki – Hopi cornmeal bread
- Proja – Type of cornbread
- Pupusa – Central American dish
- Sloosh – Variety of cornbread popular during the American Civil War
- Sope – Traditional Mexican dish
- Sopa paraguaya – Traditional food in Paraguayan cuisine
- Spoonbread – Cornmeal pudding from the Southern United States
- Talo – Unleavened maize flatbread from Basque Country
- Totopo – Oaxacan nixtamalized corn flatbread
- Wotou – Northern Chinese steamed cornmeal bread
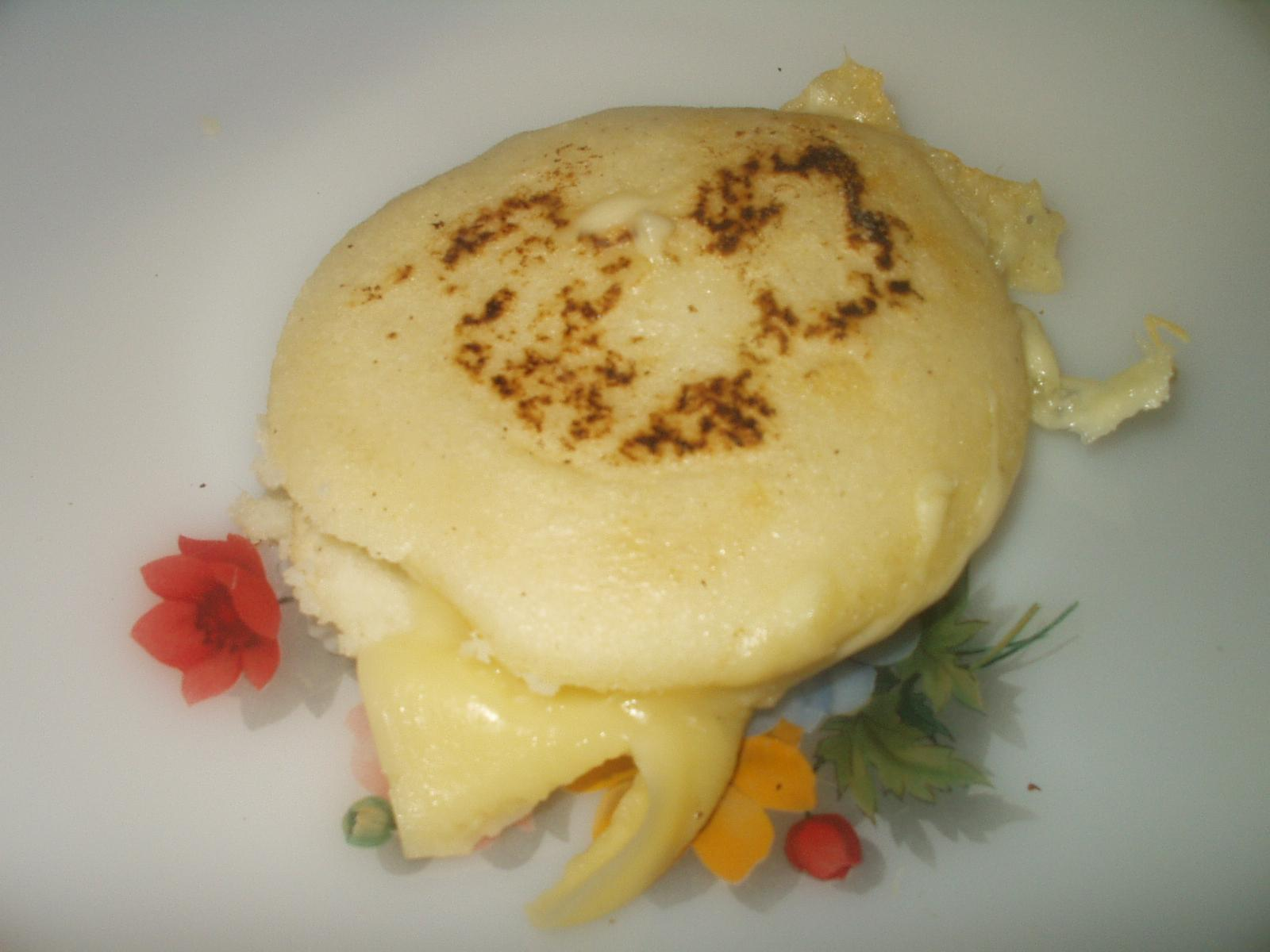
A cheese-filled arepa

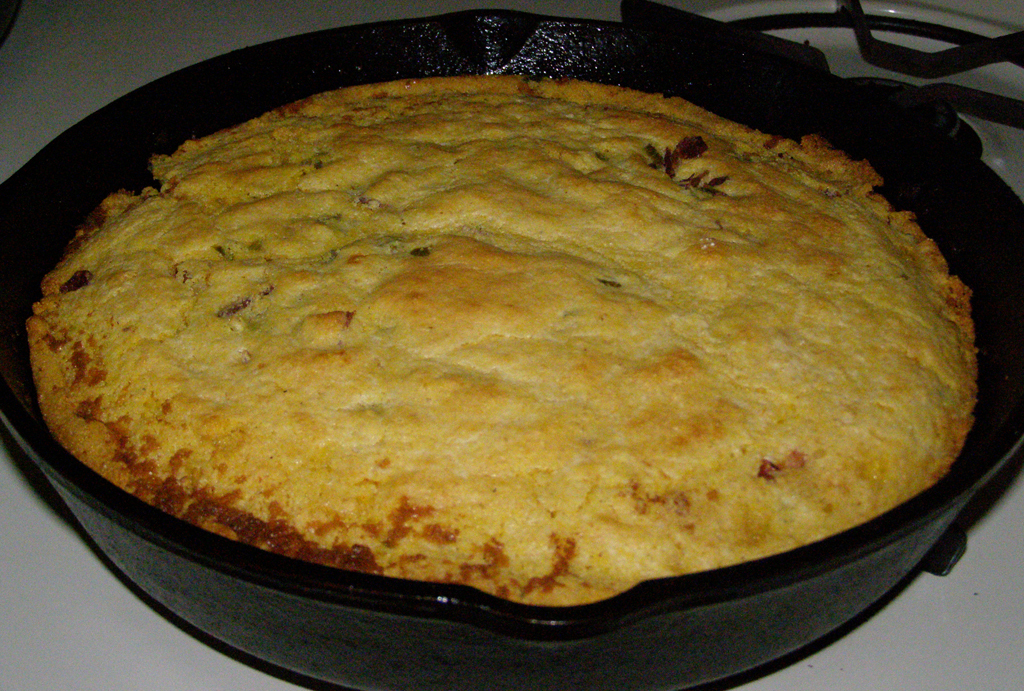
Cornbread cooked in a skillet

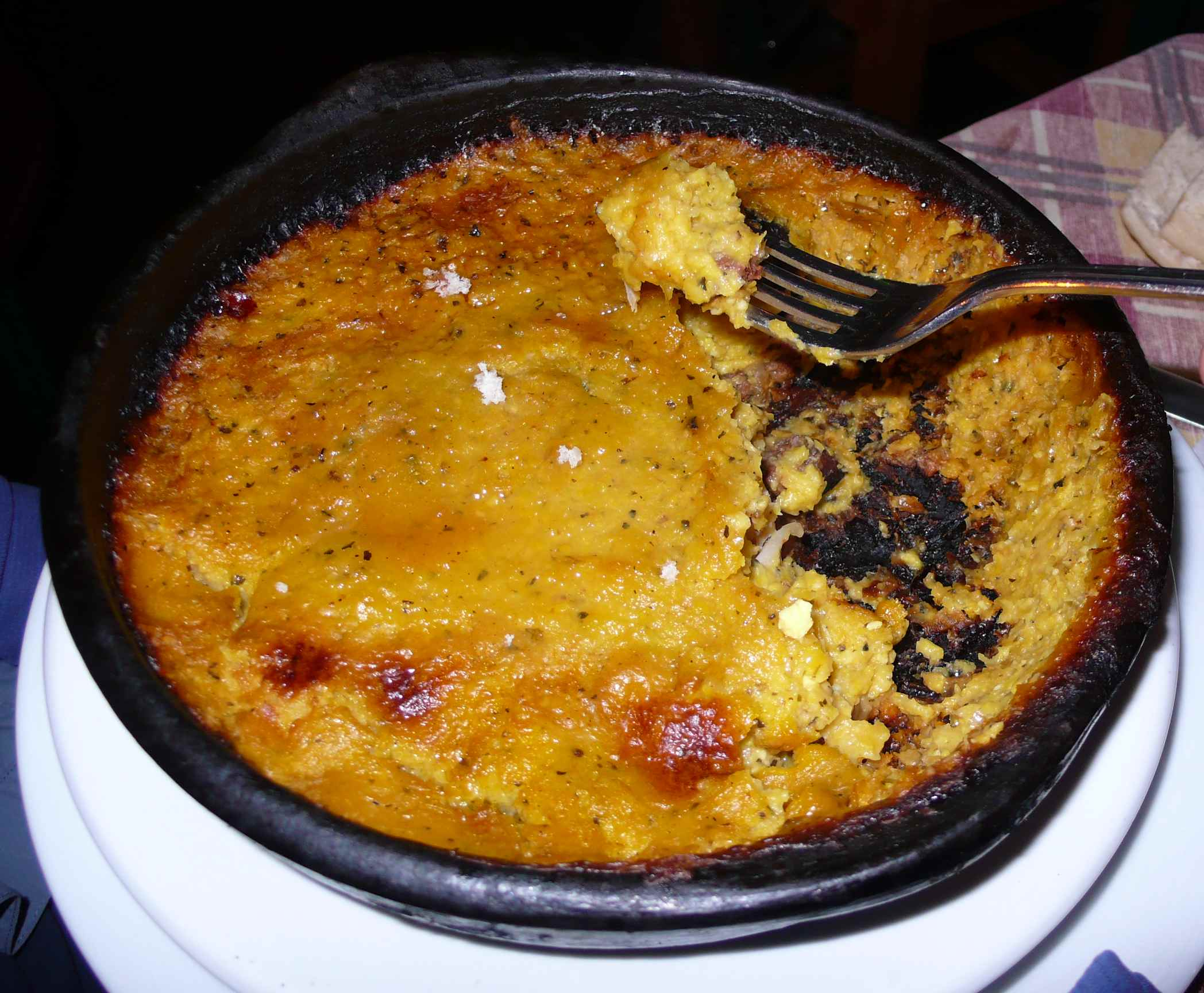
Pastel de choclo is a pastel food based on sweet corn or choclo

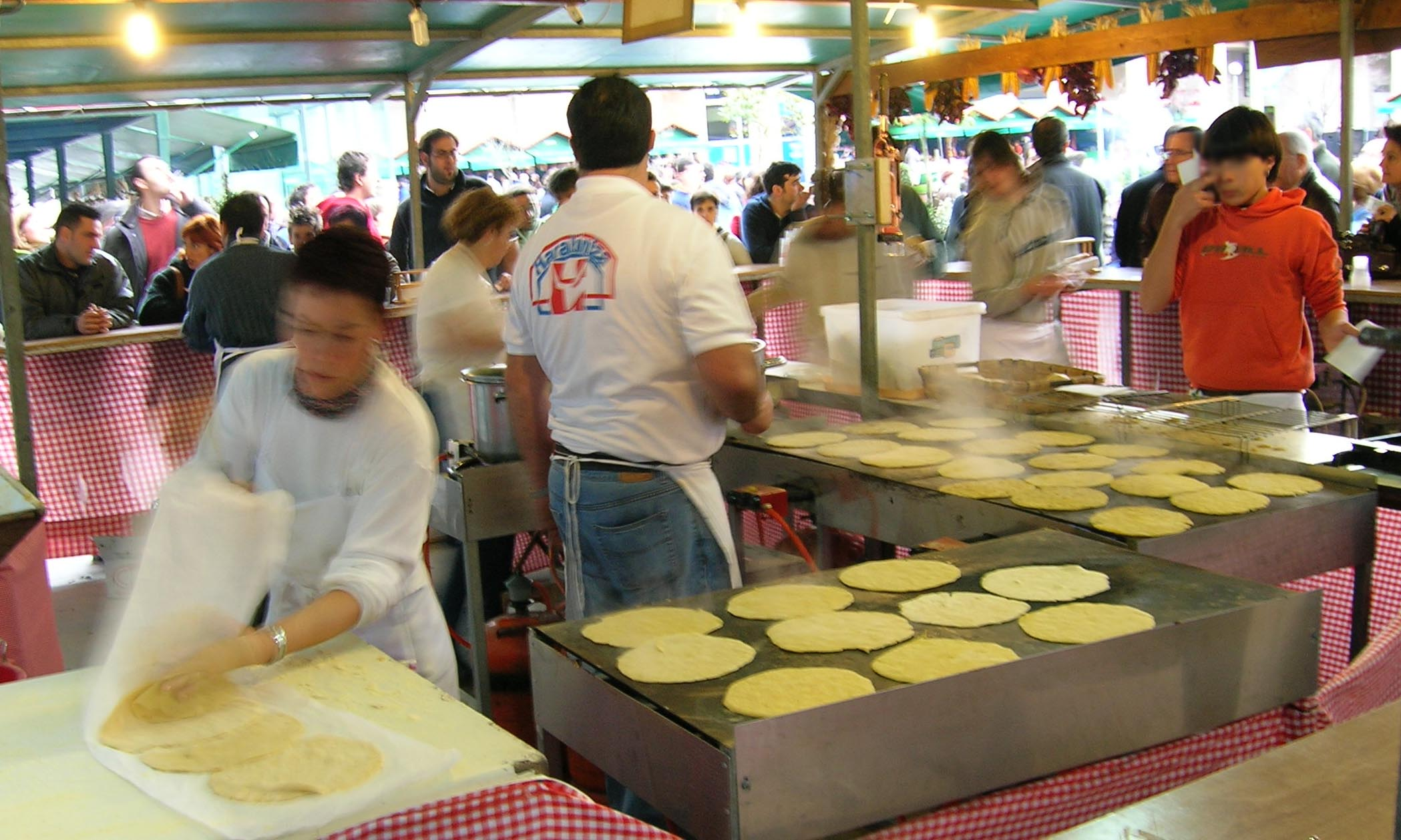
Talo being prepared in Leioa, Biscay

==== Tortilla dishes ====
Corn tortillas are used to prepare many other dishes.

- Enchiladas – Corn tortilla rolled around a filling and covered with a sauce
- Nachos – Tortilla chip dish
- Panuchos – Tortilla dish from the Yucatán peninsula
- Quesadillas – Mexican dish of tortillas with melted cheese
- Salbutes – Tortilla dish from the Yucatán peninsula
- Taco – Mexican filled tortilla dish
- Taquito – Mexican dish
- Tortilla chip – Snack food made from corn tortillas
- Tostada – Flat or bowl-shaped tortilla that is deep-fried or toasted
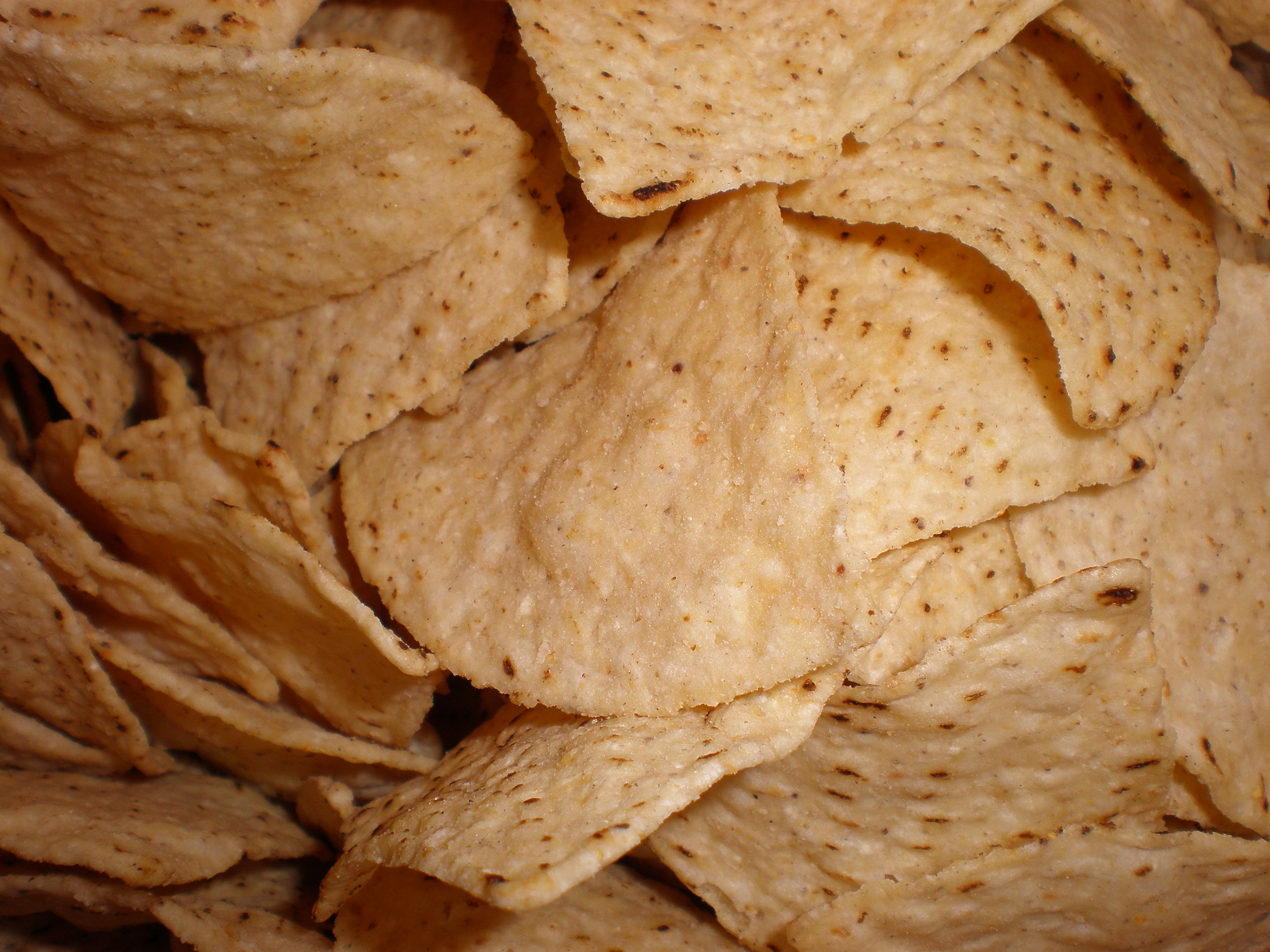
Tortilla chips

=== Fried dishes ===
Assorted fried snacks and other fritters are made from corn or cornmeal.

- Battered sausage – Savoury fried meat dish from Britain
- Corn fritter – Fried cakes of maize dough
- Corn chip – Snack food made from cornmeal
- Corn dog – Deep-fried, corn-battered hot dog on a stick
- Corn nut – Snack made from corn kernels
- Cornick – Filipino deep-fried crunchy corn snack
- Hushpuppy – Deep-fried savory food made from cornmeal batter
- Milho frito – Portuguese fried cornmeal dish
- Sorullos – Puerto Rican fried cornmeal dish
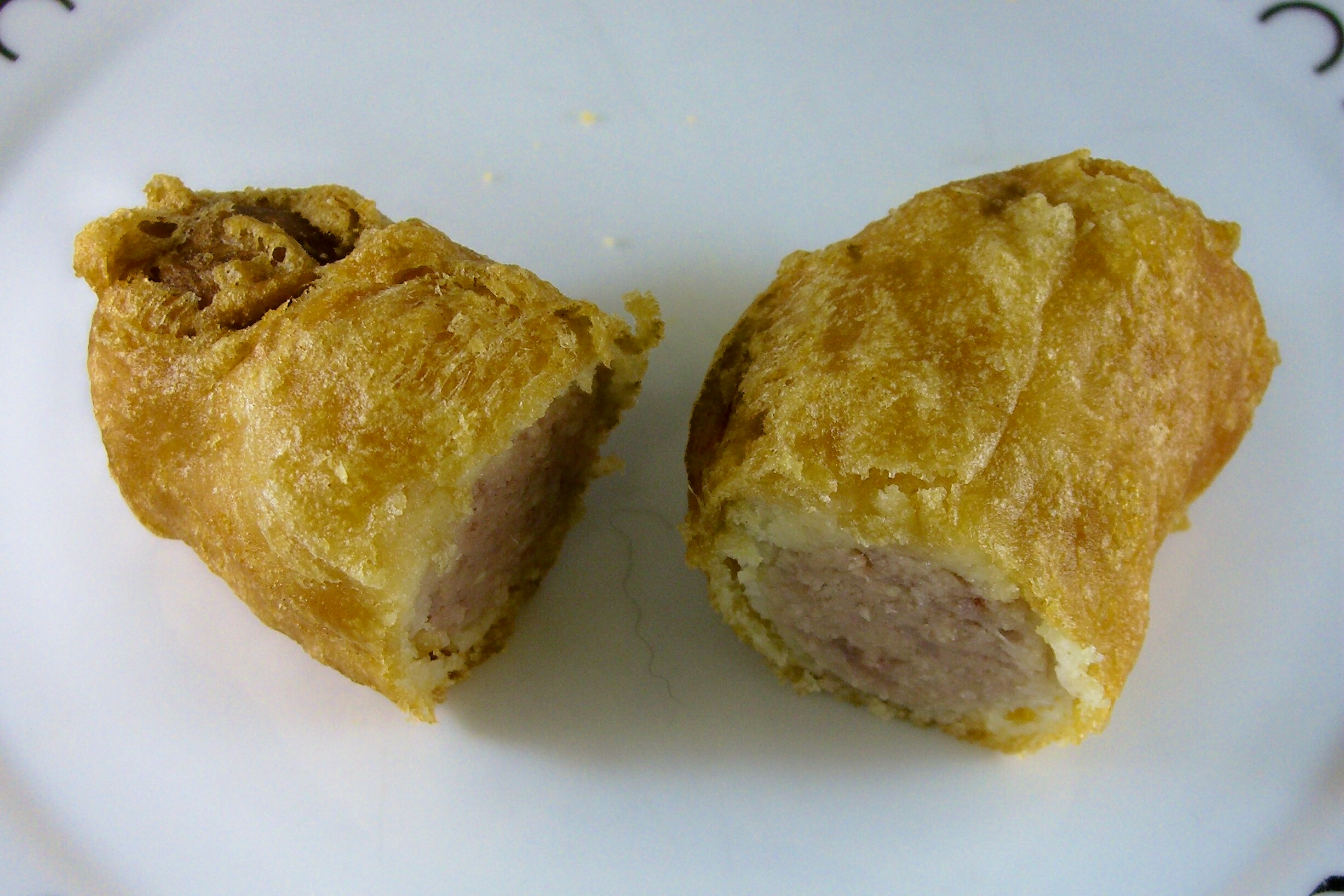
A battered sausage, sliced in half after cooking

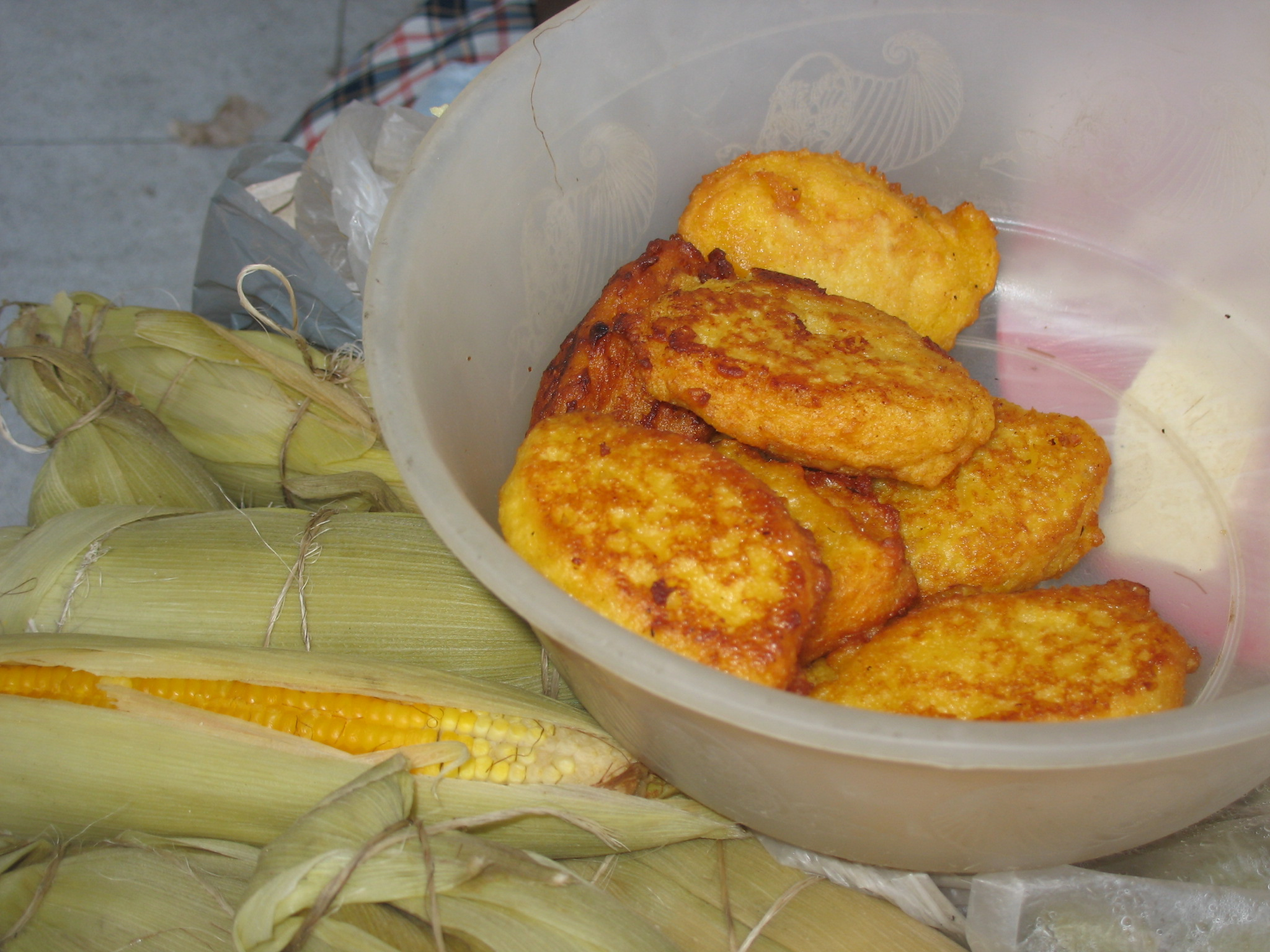
Corn fritters

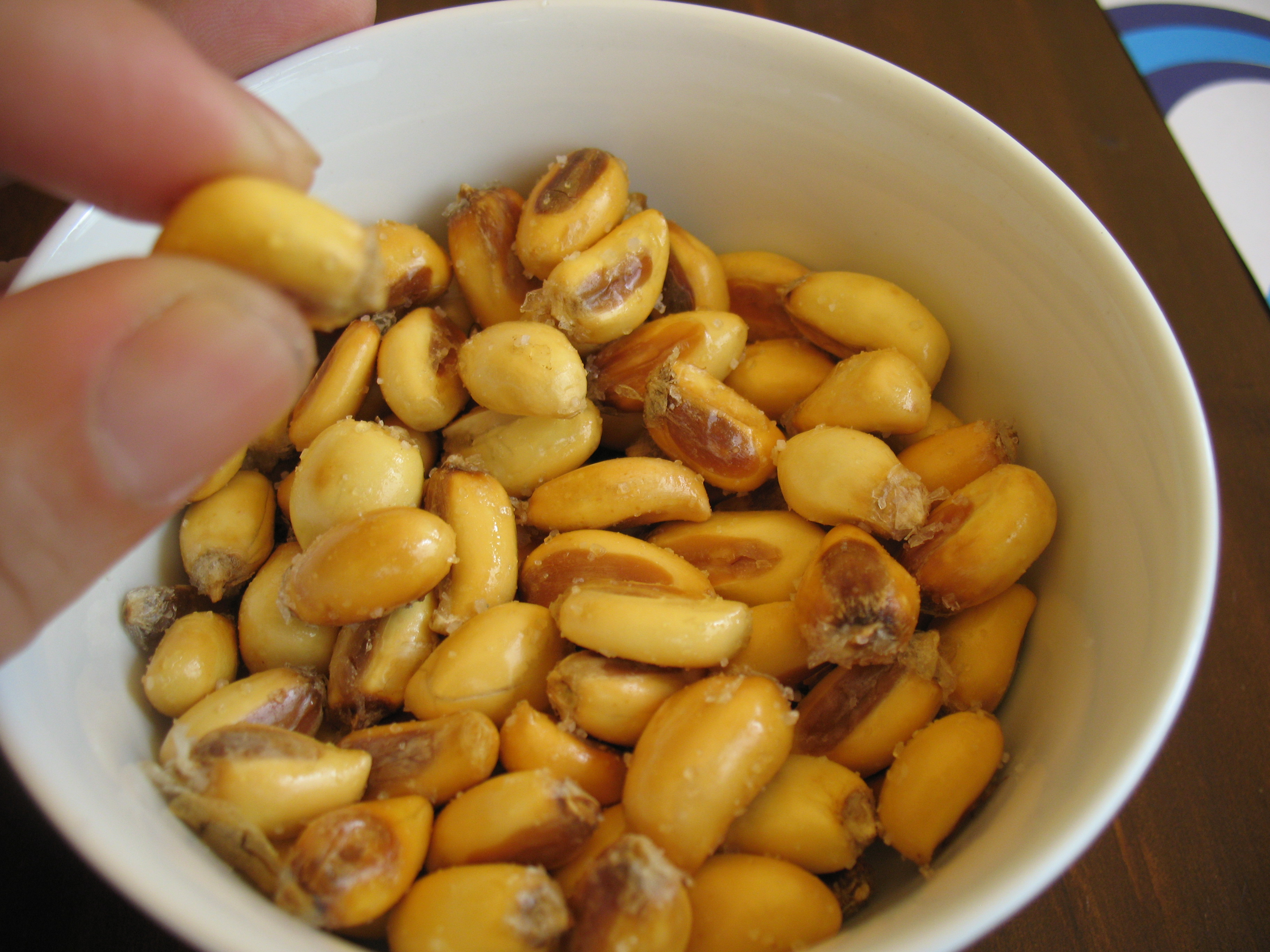
Corn nuts, known as cancha in Peru, are a fried corn snack.

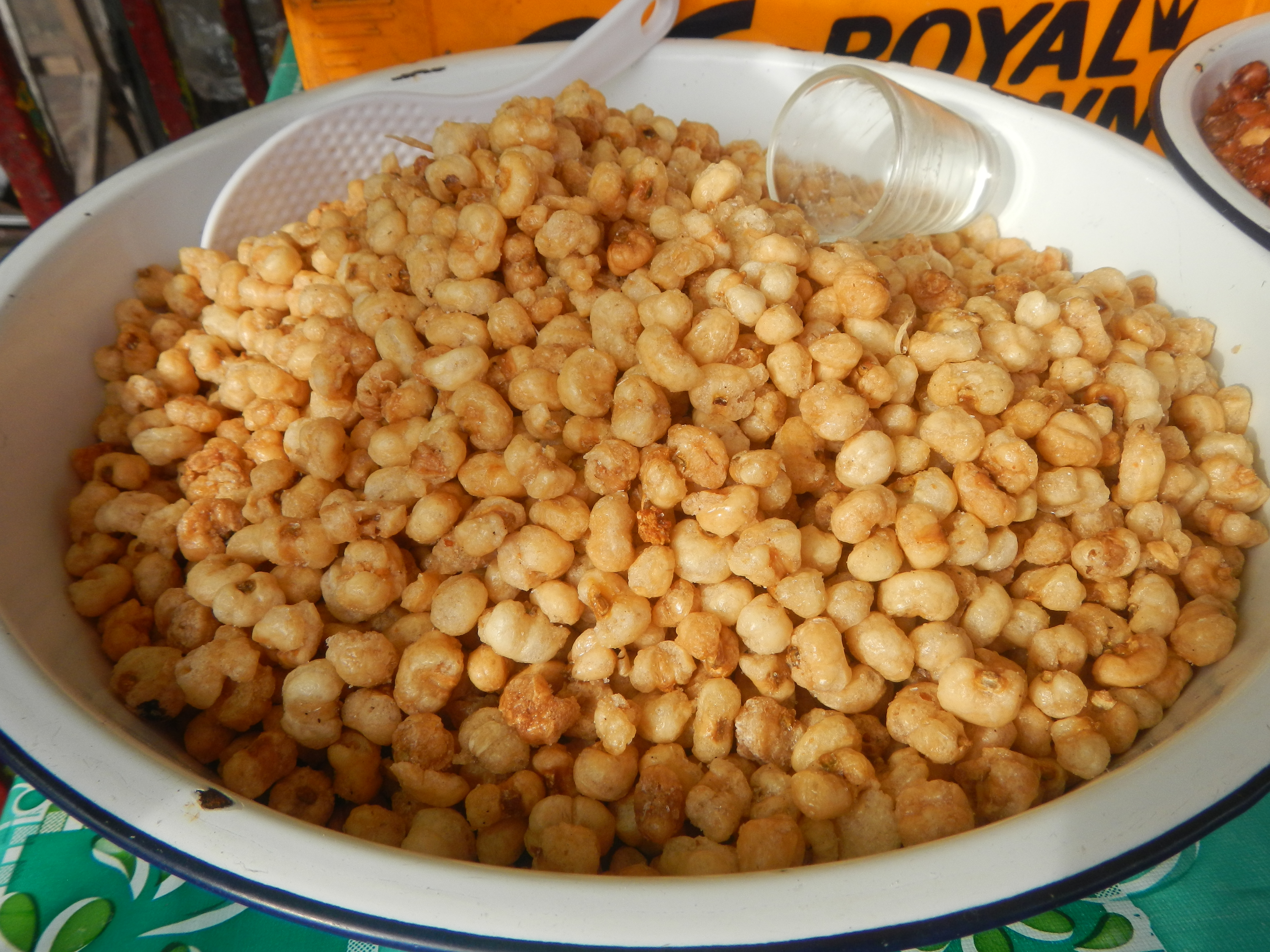
Cornick from the Philippines is soaked for three days before deep-frying.

=== Other ===
- Alivenci – Traditional Moldavian custard tart
- Binatog – Filipino boiled corn dessert
- Conkies – Steamed Caribbean corn dish
- Corn cheese – South Korean cuisine
- Corn flakes – Type of breakfast cereal
- Corn on the cob – Whole sweet corn, consumed as food
- Corn relish – Corn kernel dish
- Corn sauce
- Esquites – Corn-based Mexican street food dish
- Gofio – Toasted flour from the Canary Islands
- Grontol – traditional meal from Central Java area of Indonesia made from boiled corn kernels that have been soaked overnight, and mixed with steamed grated coconut.
- Hominy – Food item consisting of dried nixtamalized corn
- Kenkey – Ground maize dumpling from West Africa
- Kuymak – Dish of cornmeal and cheese
- Maíz con hielo – Shaved ice dessert from the Philippines
- Maja maíz – Filipino pudding of coconut milk and cornstarch
- Maque choux – Creole vegetable braise
- Mote – Corn kernels boiled in lime
- Pinole – Roasted ground maize mixed with other powdered foodstuffs
- Popcorn – Type of corn kernel which expands and puffs upon heating
- Succotash – Traditional American food
- Suantangzi – fermented corn noodles from northeastern China linked to bongkrek acid poisoning.
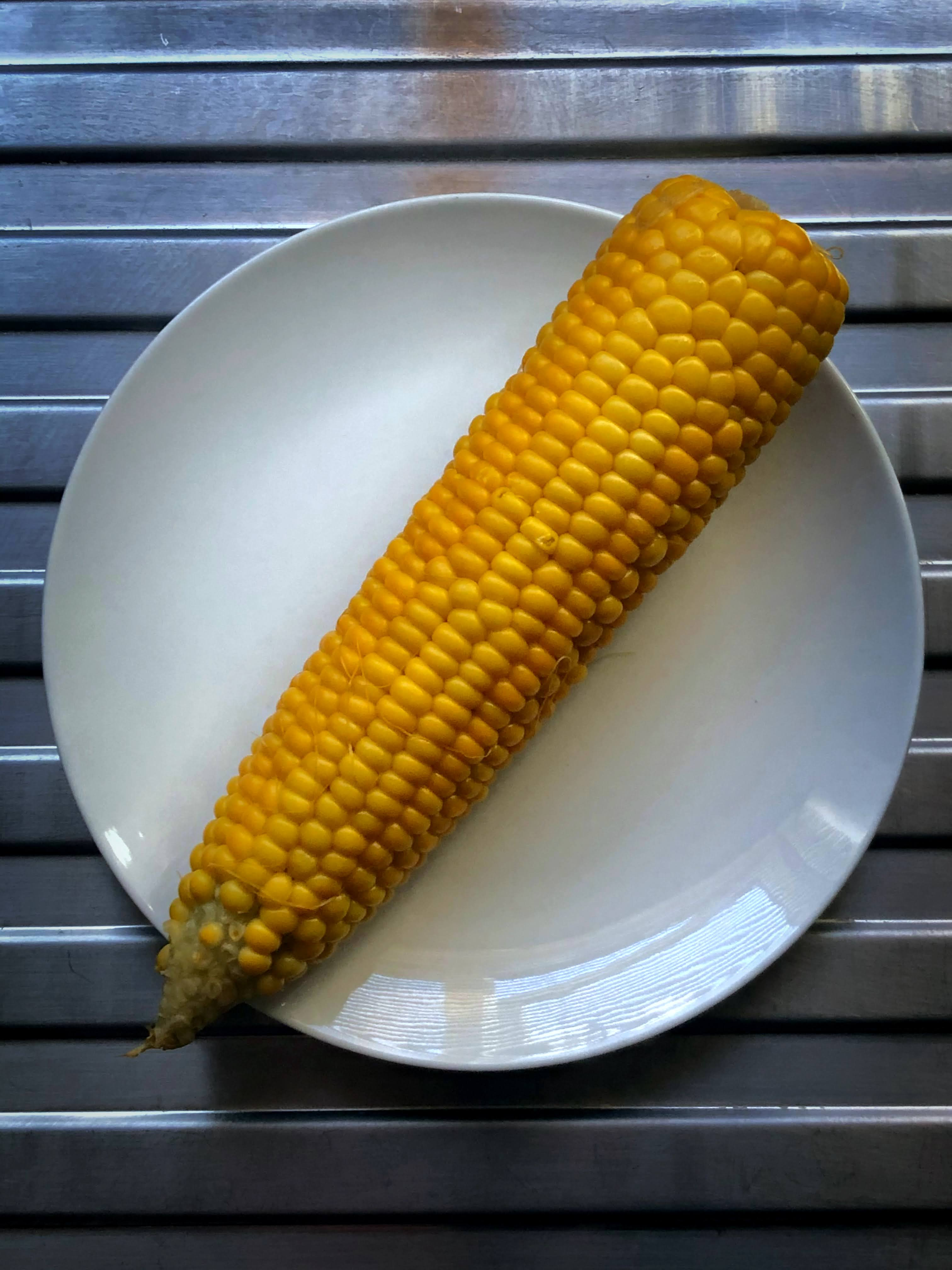
Boiled corn on a white plate

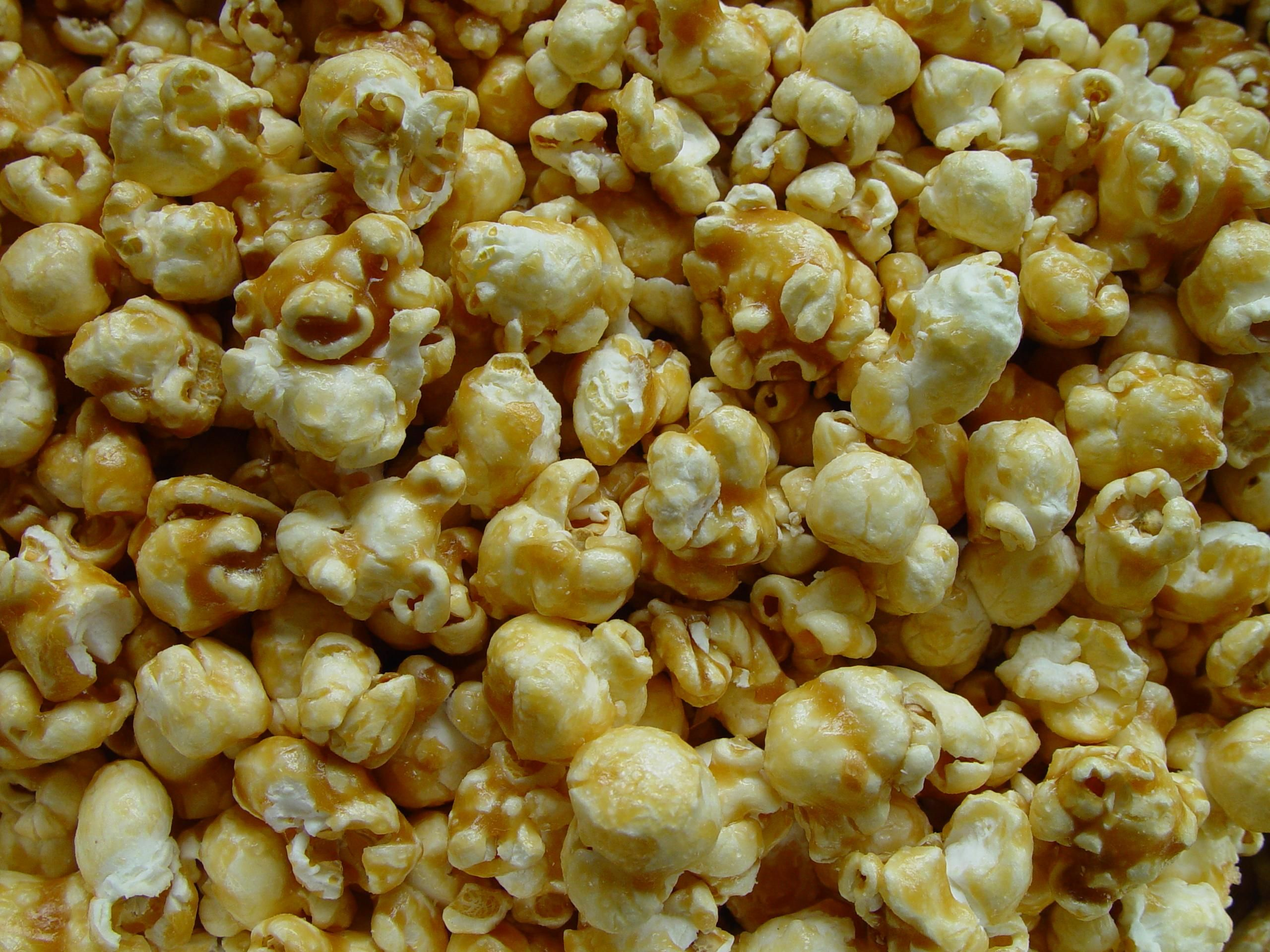
Candied popcorn

== Beverages ==
Corn can be fermented into alcoholic drinks, infused as a tisane, or ground and used to thicken drinks.

- Atole – Mesoamerican hot corn beverage
- Bourbon whiskey – American whiskey
- Cauim – Prehispanic Brazilian alcoholic beverage
- Champurrado – Mexican chocolate beverage
- Chicha – Beverage from prehispanic Latin America
- Chicha de jora – Prehispanic corn beer from Peru
- Chicha morada – Prehispanic corn beverage from Peru
- Colada morada – Purple hot corn beverage from Ecuador
- Corn beer – Beer style made from corn
- Corn tea – Korean grain tea made from maize
- Corn whiskey – American liquor made from corn
- Mazamorra – Dish from Spain and Hispanic America
- Pinolillo – Nicaraguan corn and cacao beverage
- Pozol – Fermented prehispanic corn beverage
- Tejate – Maize and cacao beverage from Oaxaca
- Tejuino – Corn-based fermented beverage from Jalisco, Mexico
- Tesgüino – Corn-based beer central to culture of Tarahumara Indians of Mexico
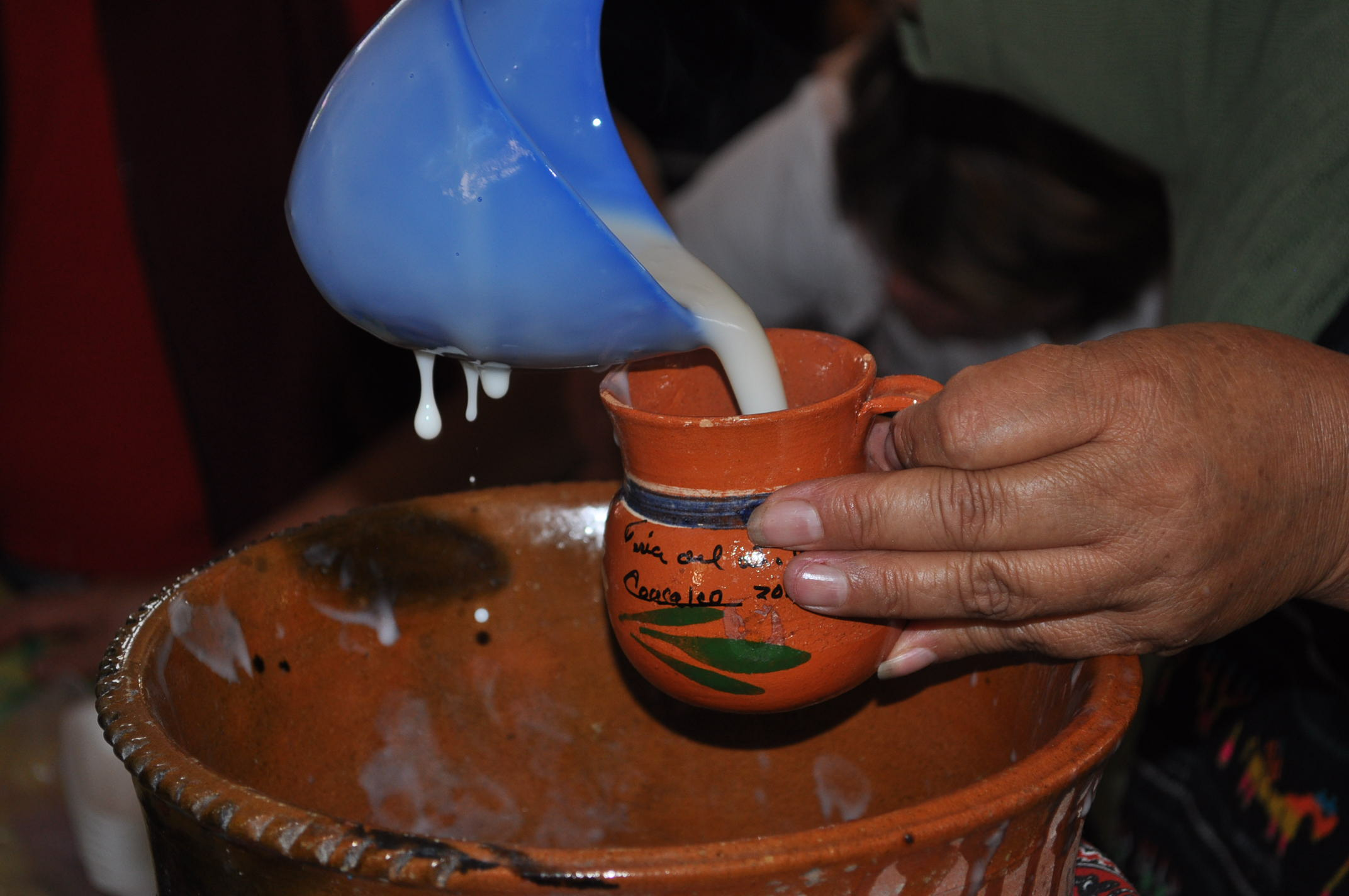
Atole served at the Atole Fair in Coacalco de Berriozábal, State of Mexico

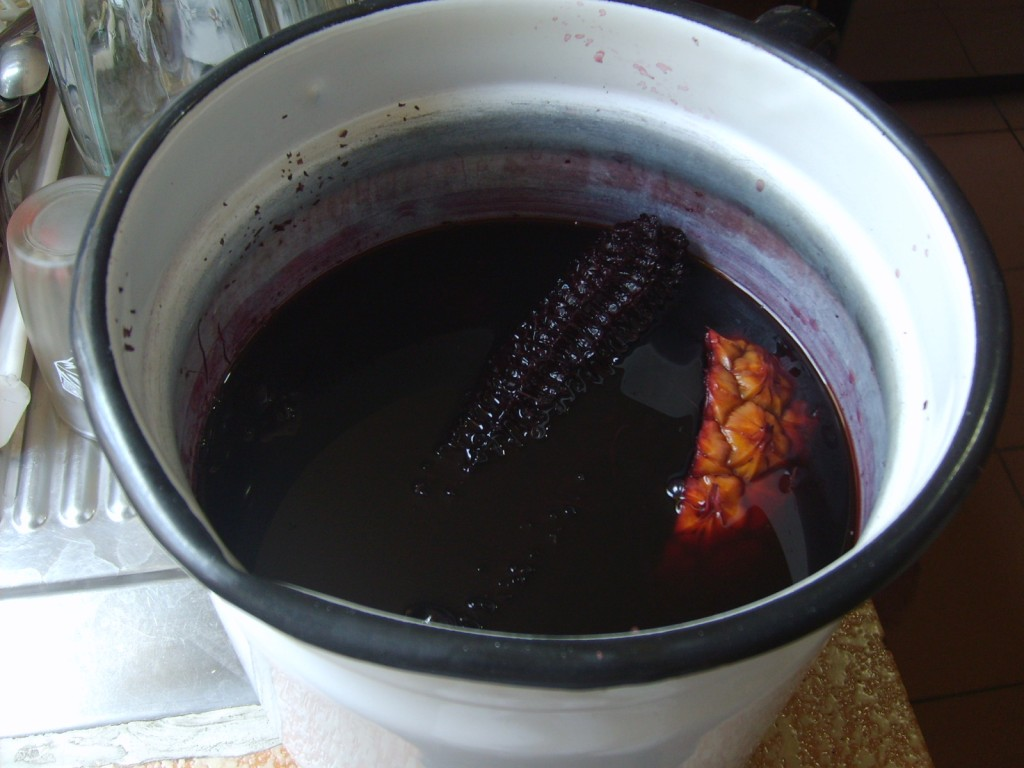
Chicha morada being prepared in Peru: unfermented chicha made from purple maize and boiled with pineapple and spices

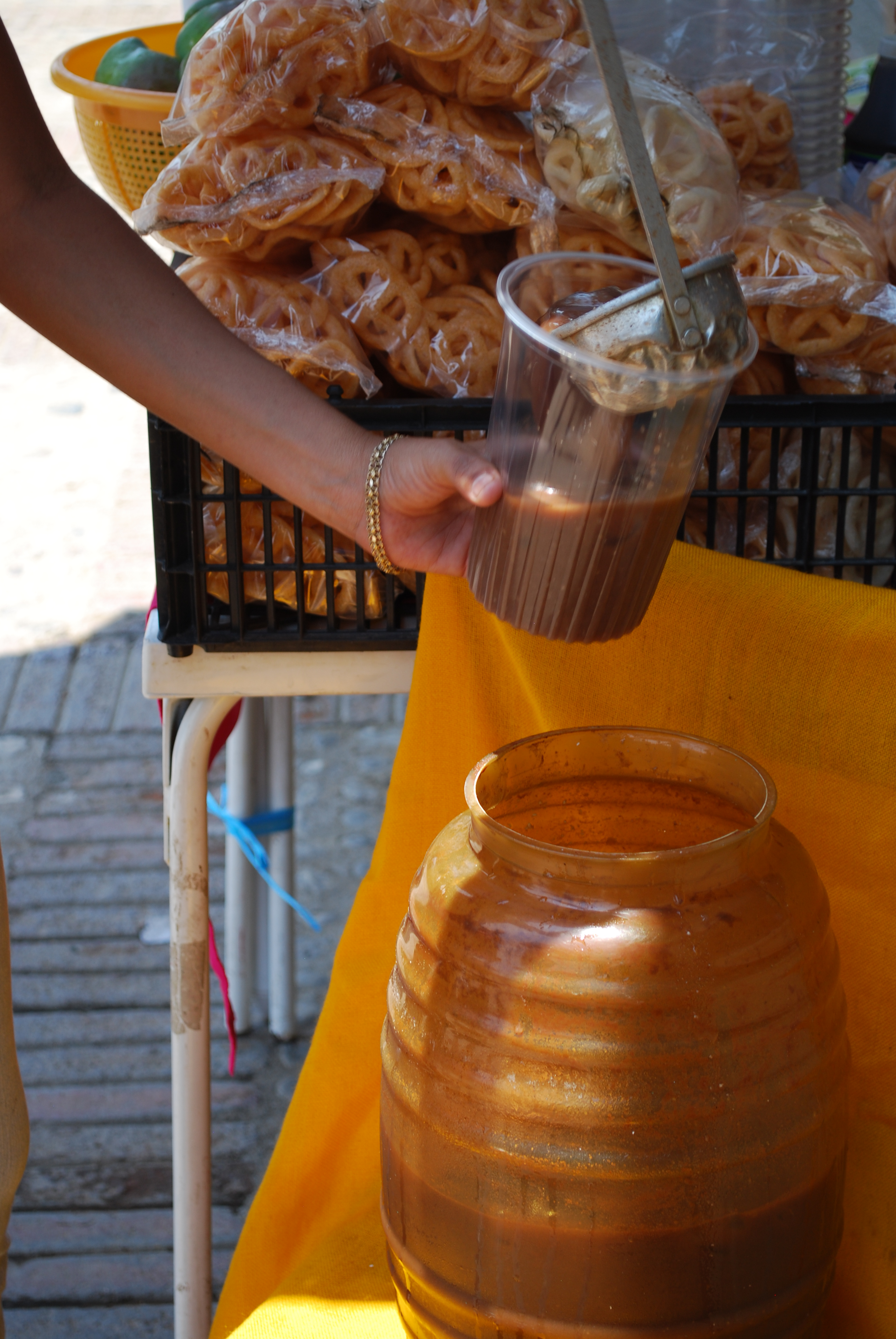
Pozol being served at the boardwalk of Chiapa de Corzo, Chiapas

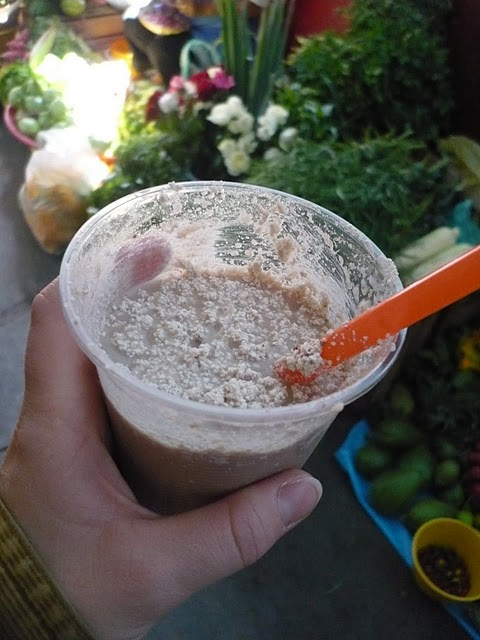
Tejate is a maize and cacao beverage traditionally made in Oaxaca, Mexico, originating from pre-Hispanic times.

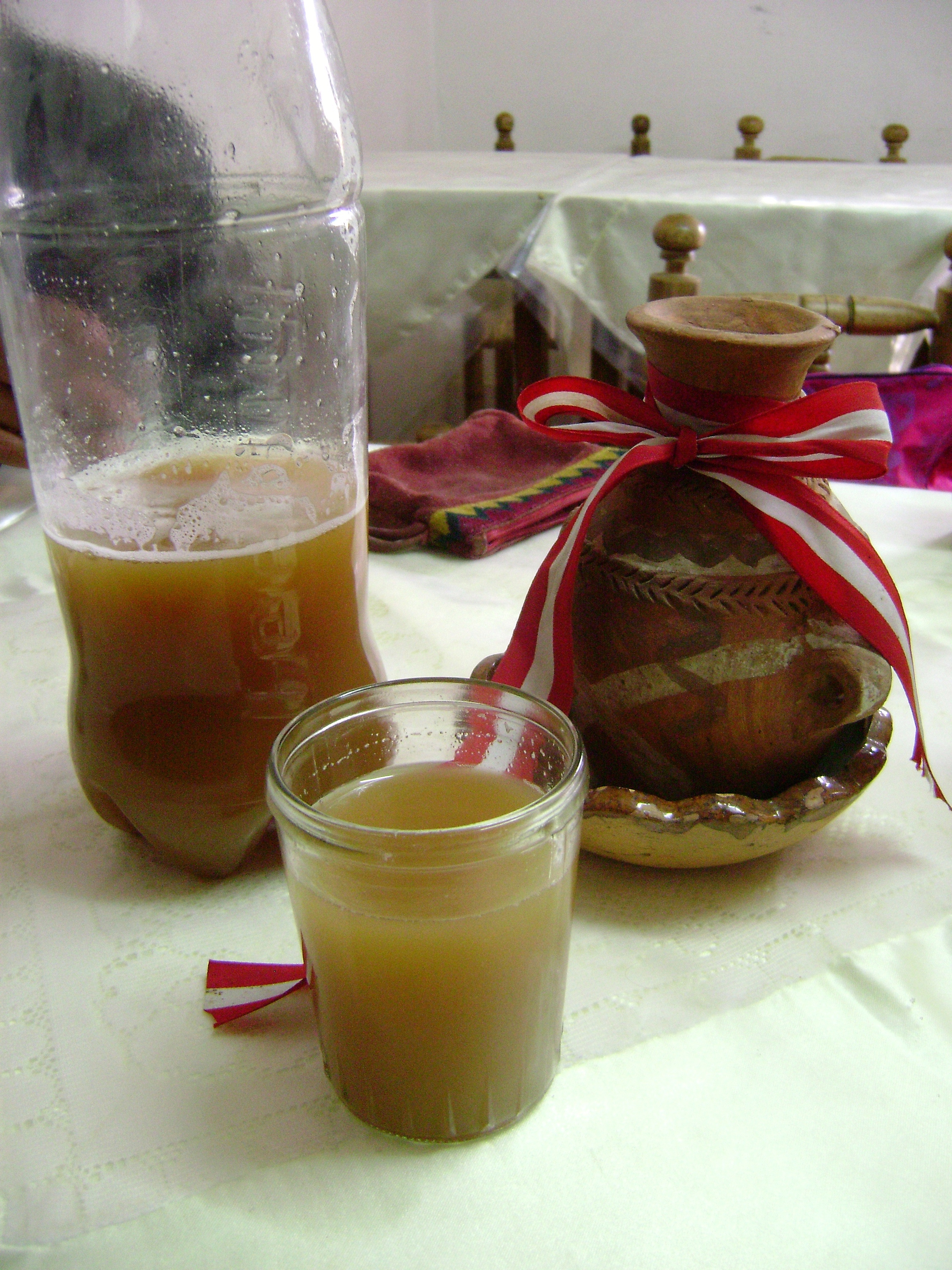
Chicha de jora is a Peruvian corn beer chicha.

== See also ==
- List of edible seeds
- List of Mexican dishes
- List of sweetcorn varieties
