= Bolo do caco =

Portuguese flatbread

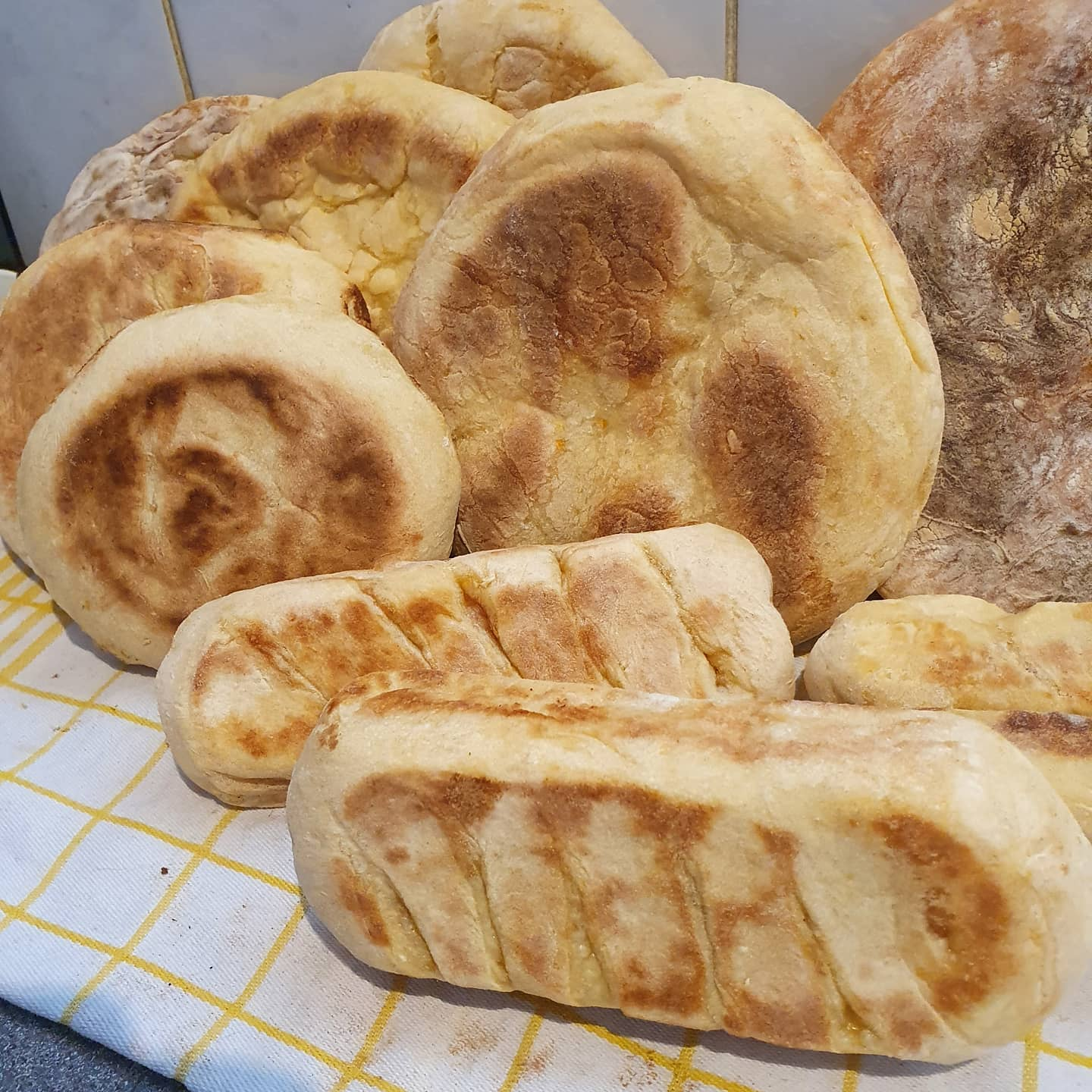
- Typical bolo do caco
- Type: Flatbread
- Place of origin: Madeira Island; Portugal
- Main ingredients: Salt, Sweet Potato, Sugar, Flour, Yeast

Bolo do caco is a round flatbread traditionally produced on the islands of Madeira and Porto Santo. It is shaped like a cake and thus called bolo (Portuguese for 'cake'). It is traditionally cooked on a caco, a flat basalt stone slab. The bread is usually served with garlic butter, or eaten as a sandwich with octopus, espetada, milho frito or as a prego (steak) sandwich.

== See also ==
- List of breads
- List of Portuguese dishes
