= Mush (cornmeal) =

Boiled cornmeal pudding

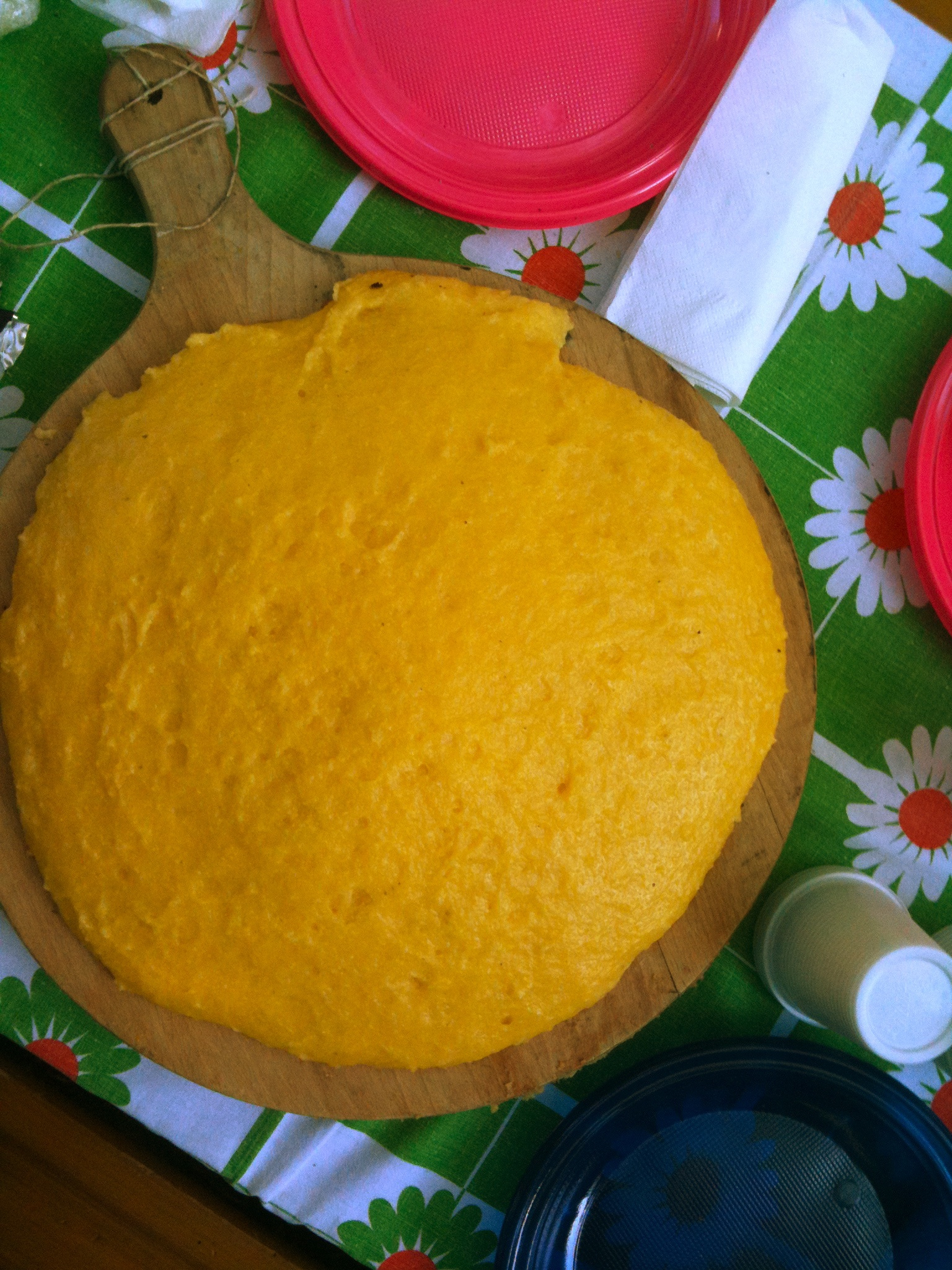
- Type: Porridge or pudding
- Place of origin: Mexico
- Main ingredients: Cornmeal, water or milk

Mush is a type of cornmeal pudding (or porridge) which is usually boiled in water or milk. It is often allowed to set, or gel into a semisolid, then cut into flat squares or rectangles, and pan-fried. Cornmeal mush is especially popular amongst Amish people as well as in parts of the Midwestern United States. In Eastern Europe, milk is poured over the meal once served and cooled down, rather than being boiled in it. Cornmeal mush is often consumed in Latin America and Africa. Mostly used in hearty meals, mush is valued for its versatility and nourishment across cultures.

== See also ==
- Cornbread
- Grits
- Gruel
- Hasty pudding
- Hominy
- Hushpuppy
- Johnnycake
- List of maize dishes
- List of porridges
- Mămăligă
- Milho frito
- Polenta
- Pudding corn
- Samp
- Ugali
