= Dog Team Tavern =

- Formerly listed on the U.S. National Register of Historic Places
- Location within Vermont Location within the United States
- Location: 1338 Dog Team Rd., Middlebury, Vermont
- Coordinates: 44°3′51″N 73°10′24″W
- Built: 1936
- Architectural style: Classical Revival
- NRHP reference No.: 02001381

Significant dates
- Added to NRHP: November 21, 2002
- Removed from NRHP: March 22, 2016

The Dog Team Tavern was a restaurant located on Dog Team Road, off U.S. Route 7, roughly 4 mi (6.4 km) north of the town of Middlebury, Vermont in Addison County. It was located geographically in the Champlain Valley of the Green Mountains, the Vermont part of the Appalachian Mountain range. The restaurant burned down in early September 2006, destroying artifacts of the Grenfell Mission and Labrador handicrafts.

The rustic restaurant was a local landmark known for its sizable portions (most notably the prime rib) and the "relish wheel," which typically contained corn relish, apple butter, horseradish cottage cheese, beets, and sauerkraut. Also, the restaurant's famous sticky buns were always served at the beginning of each meal. The restaurant was very popular among students from nearby Middlebury College, who often flocked there with family during the college's fall family weekends. It was listed on the National Register of Historic Places in 2002, and delisted in 2016.

== History ==
The Dog Team Tavern was originally constructed in the 1920s by Sir Wilfred and Lady Anne Grenfell. The building was originally a mission house that was started by Grenfell and his wife in 1931. The Dog Team Tavern was opened in 1936 as a tea house and outlet for handicrafts from Newfoundland and Labrador. Earlier in 1931, Sir Wilfred and Lady Anne retired to Charlotte, Vermont, where they built Kinloch House. In 1934, the couple opened a Dog Team Tea House in Ferrisburg, Vermont, and about that time they opened houses in Oxford and Guilford, Connecticut. When Eben and Catherine Joy purchased the Dog Team Tavern from the International Grenfell Association (of New York City) in 1946 they opened it as a restaurant, adding a bar/tavern later when they were able to obtain a license in "dry" New Haven.

Eben Joy, and his second wife, Eileen, sold the Dog Team Tavern to Andrew Golbert of Burlington, Vermont (now of Essex Junction), in 1978. Andrew Golbert sold the DTT to Chris Hesslink and Robert Mahoney in 1987, with Mahoney leaving the business circa 1996/97, when Hesslink reorganized and continued the business until it burned on September 1, 2006. Hesslink's body was recovered from the fire.

The Dog Team has catered to celebrities such as Eleanor Roosevelt, Robert Frost, Charles Lawton, Neil Diamond, Michael Eisner and more. Originally, the staff lived upstairs as the restaurant was only open in the summers. Later, it was open all year. There was a small building next door which of late has been used as a gift shop; but in previous times it was known as The Dog Team Playhouse, and several shows were put on there.

The tavern was listed on the National Register of Historic Places in 2002, and was delisted in 2016.

Among the treasures lost in the 2006 fire were a Grenfell overcoat donated by Arlene LaFave, a Grenfell snowsuit for a child, a huge collection of old political buttons, a beautiful Victorian period dollhouse, an old handpainted sign for orange soda, the hide of a wallaby and the head of a bear, two Grenfell throw pillows with the face of a husky embroidered on each one, original posters and articles detailing Sir Grenfell's work and lectures, two oil paintings by different artists of the restaurant, one painting of Sir Wilfred Grenfell, a marble statue of snow drifts with a little dogsled and dogs and at least a dozen unique Grenfell silk mats.

== Customer service ==
The Dog Team had an unusual system of serving. Upon arriving at the restaurant, the menu was presented on a board just inside the entrance way. Customers gave their names and orders at that time, and went inside the building to wait. Waiting times of an hour or more were not uncommon during busy times.

Customers could wait within the front parlor, where old overstuffed couches were provided along with old copies of such magazines as Life and Saturday Review, or they could go through the serving area to the bar and wait there while enjoying horseradish cottage cheese dip with ridged potato chips. There was also an outside porch and in earlier years a gazebo and tables set up in the back by the rushing New Haven River. Benches out front read "Vermont Democrats" and "Vermont Republicans".

Much has been made about their relish wheel and sticky buns (which were strictly rationed, although often purchased to take home), but they also served little loaves of homemade bread and a fresh salad featuring a choice of three of their own dressings (including an "Alsatian" French). This did not include the appetizer (typically a glass of juice or soup du jour) which customers ordered when they came in. First-time customers were usually full before the entrees even arrived. The meal wrapped up with shared sides of mashed potatoes and the vegetable du jour, before ending on a sweet note with dessert.
