= Prego (Portuguese sandwich) =

Portuguese beef dish

Bitoque do prego
- Place of origin: Sintra
- Region or state: Lisbon
- Associated cuisine: Portuguese cuisine
- Created by: Manuel Dias Prego
- Main ingredients: Beef steak

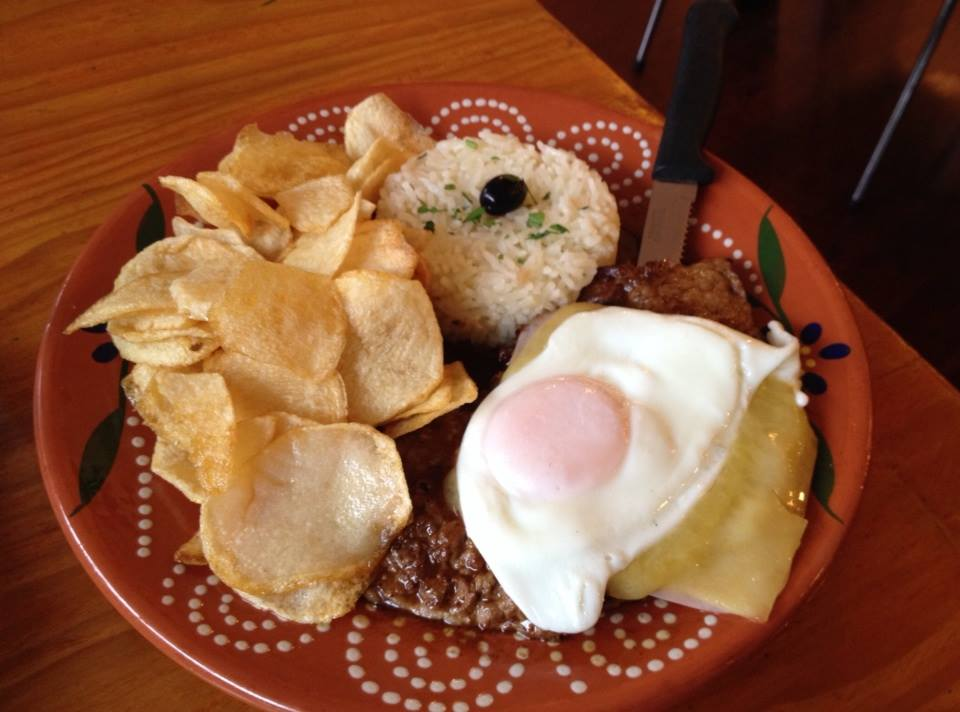
“Steak with egg on sandwich”

The prego, also known as bitoque do prego, called prego no prato when served as a dish or prego no pão when served as a sandwich, (Portuguese: bitoque de prego) is a typical Portuguese dish. It consists of a small beef patty which is normally served as a standalone dish or a sandwich, sometimes on a bolo do caco.

== Composition ==
The prego is a common Portuguese dish and can be eaten on bread or as a standalone dish. Normally, it is prepared with mustard or a spicy, barbecue-like sauce.

When served as a dish, it tends to be paired with french fries, rice, egg, and salad. Sometimes, it can contain ham between the beef and the egg.

The composition varies; however, all varieties contain a beef, or occasionally pork, steak and some side dishes. When made with pork, usually a bitoque do porco (Portuguese egged pork) is used. From the beginning of the 2000s, many people begun to avoid this dish out of fear for infected meat due to mad cow disease.

== Origin ==
The 1988 Portuguese book titled Sintra's old shops VI (Portuguese: Velharias de Sintra VI), named for the Portuguese city of Sintra, refers to Manuel Dias Prego in the food and drink business towards the end of the 20th century, as one of the founders of Praia das Maçãs (Apple Beach), at a rudimentary tavern where Colares wines were served, paired with fried or roasted veal, served on flavorful bread from local bakers. The business prospered, thanks to the fame and renown the "bifanas do prego" (prego steaks) earned.

The word entered the layman's lexicon before the turn of the 21st century, simply named "prego" in memory of its creator.
