= Espetada =

Technique of cooking food on skewers

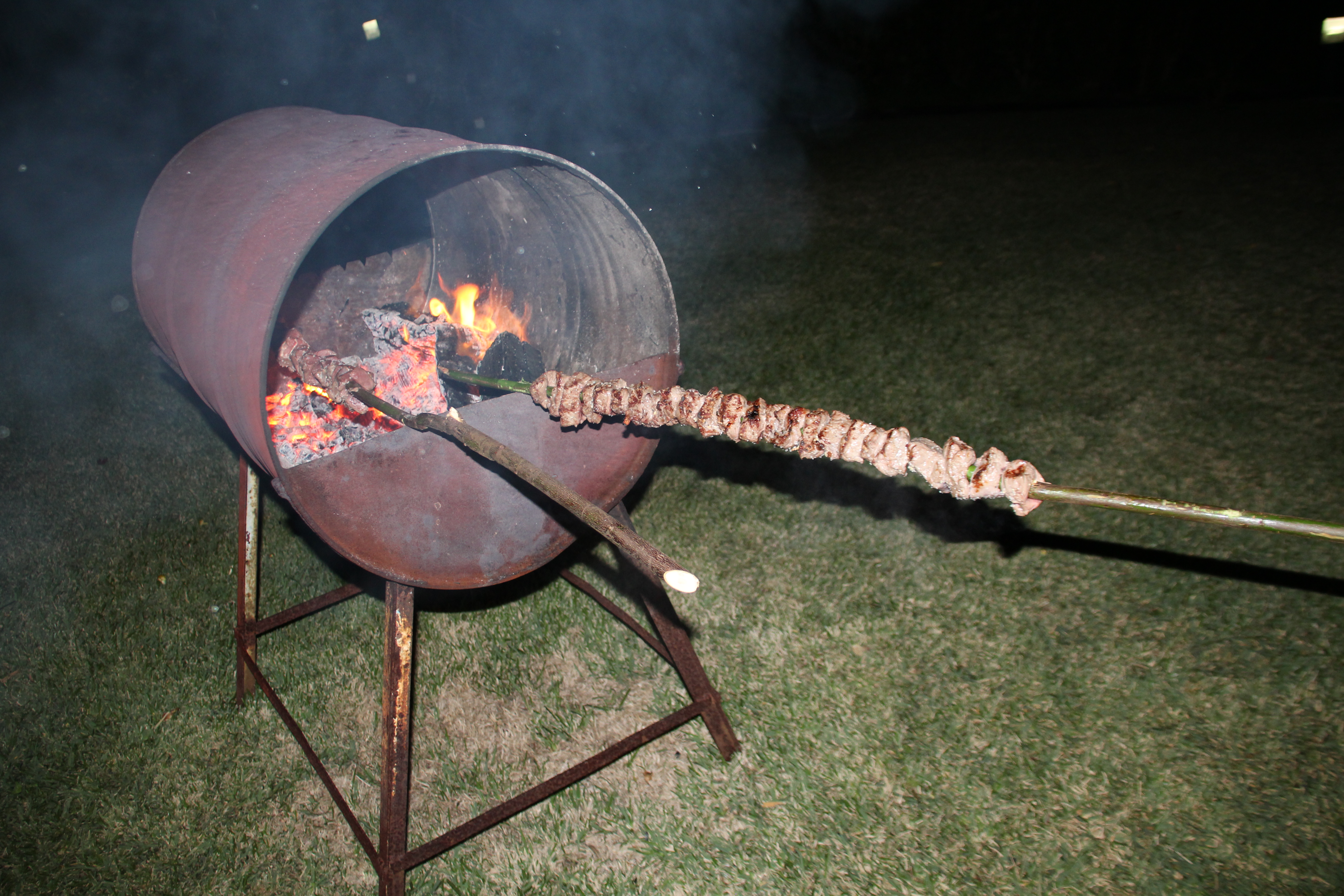
- Course: Main
- Place of origin: Portugal
- Region or state: Madeira
- Serving temperature: Hot
- Main ingredients: Meat

Espetada (also known as espetinho, especially in Brazil) is the Portuguese term used for the technique of cooking food on skewers, and for the dishes prepared that way. Espetada is a traditional dish in Portuguese cuisine.

In Portugal, espetadas can be prepared with different types of meat, as well as squid or fish, with monkfish being commonly used. The most common are beef or pork, or a mixture of the two. More recently, turkey or chicken is used. Often pieces of bell pepper, onion, and chouriço are placed between the meat pieces. Espetada is usually accompanied by white rice or potatoes, and salad.

In Madeira, beef on bay laurel skewers is a typical dish, with origins in the Strait of Câmara de Lobos. The meat, after being cut into cubes and before being grilled, is seasoned with salt, garlic, and bay leaf. It is then cooked over hot coals or wood chips. Bolo do caco is usually eaten with it, or milho frito, fried squares or triangles of firmly set polenta, to soak up the juices of the meat.

The dish can be served on a skewer which hangs from a hook on a stand for presentation.

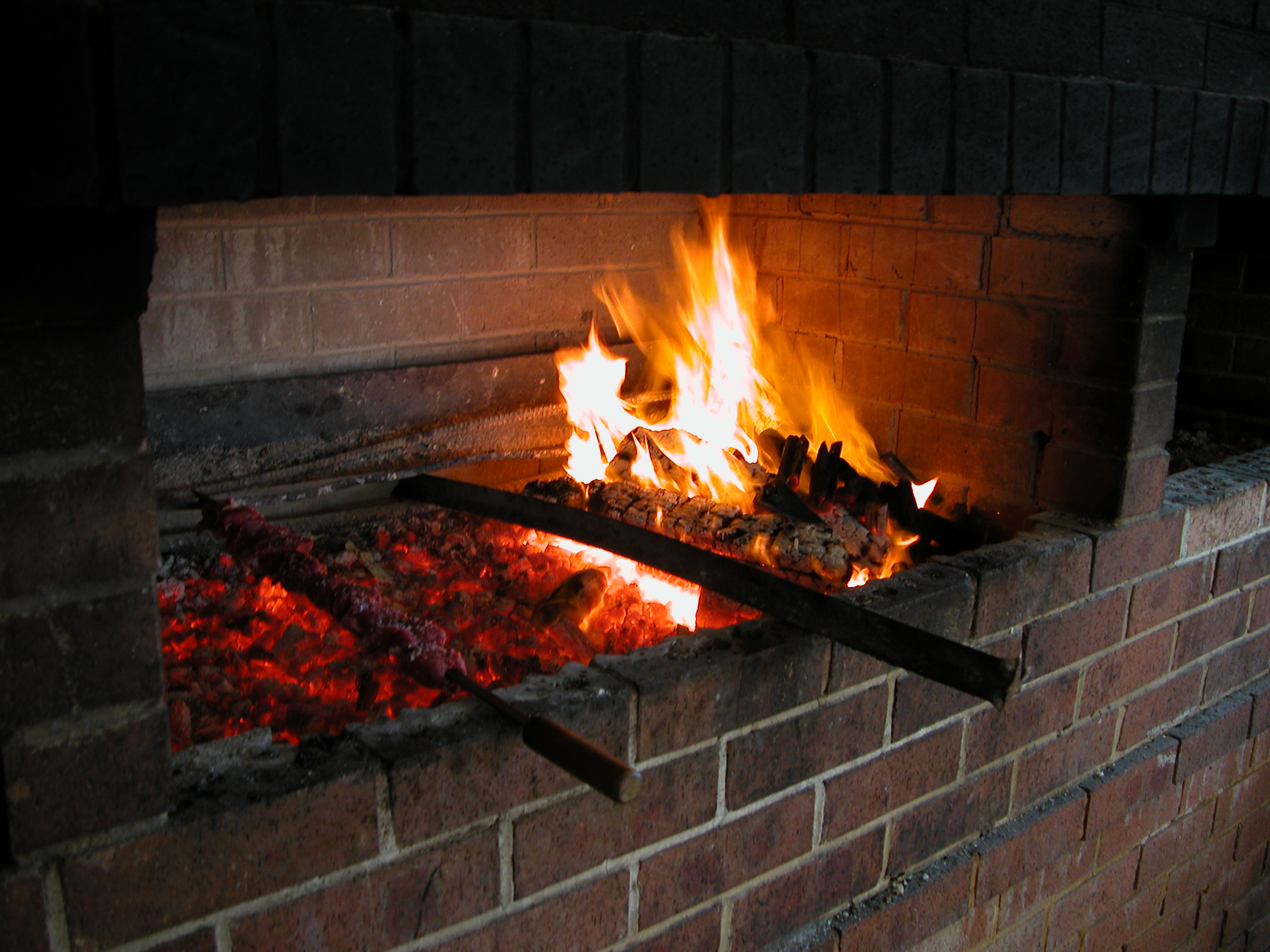
Grilling espetada at a Portuguese community day in Petersham

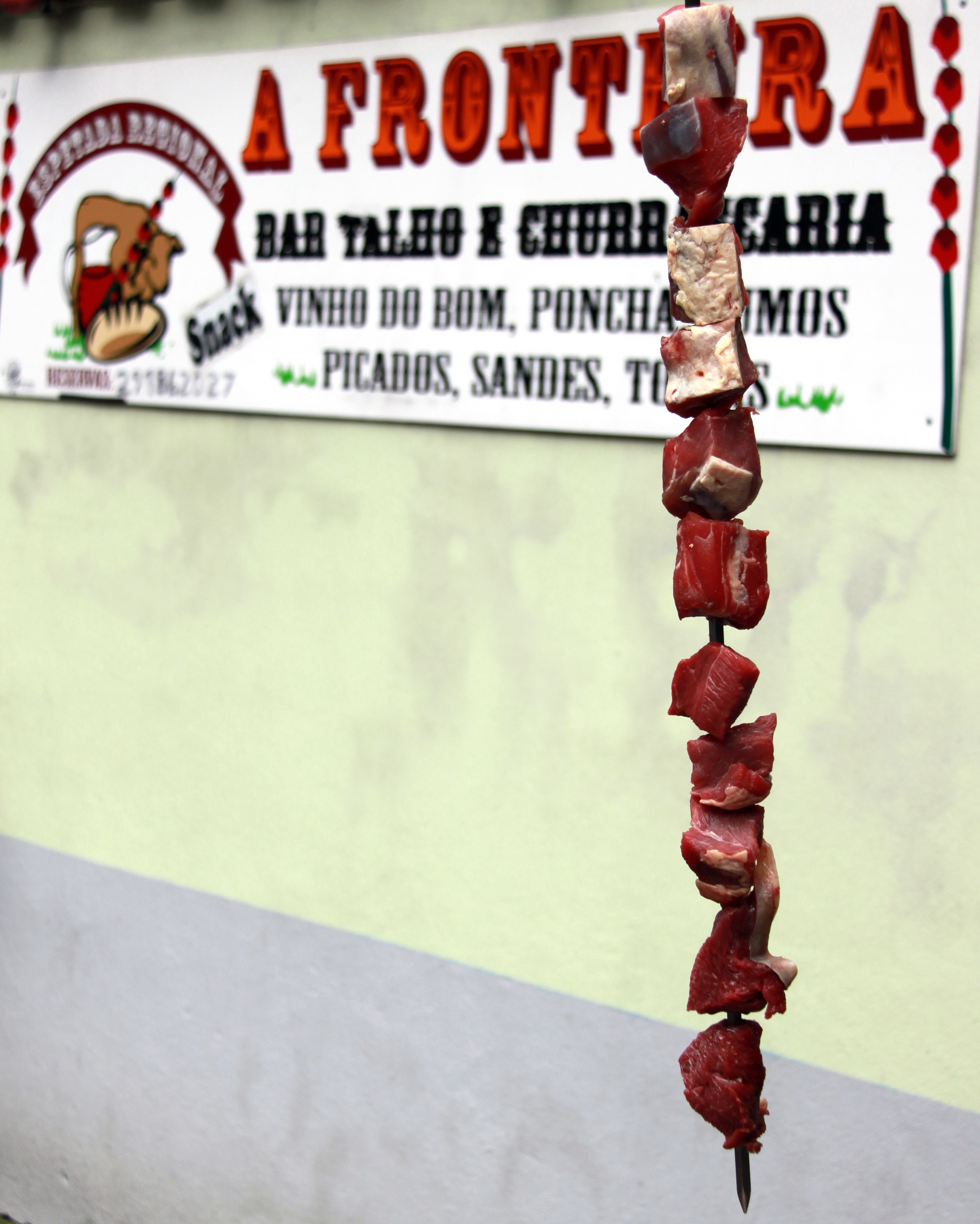
Espetada before being cooked

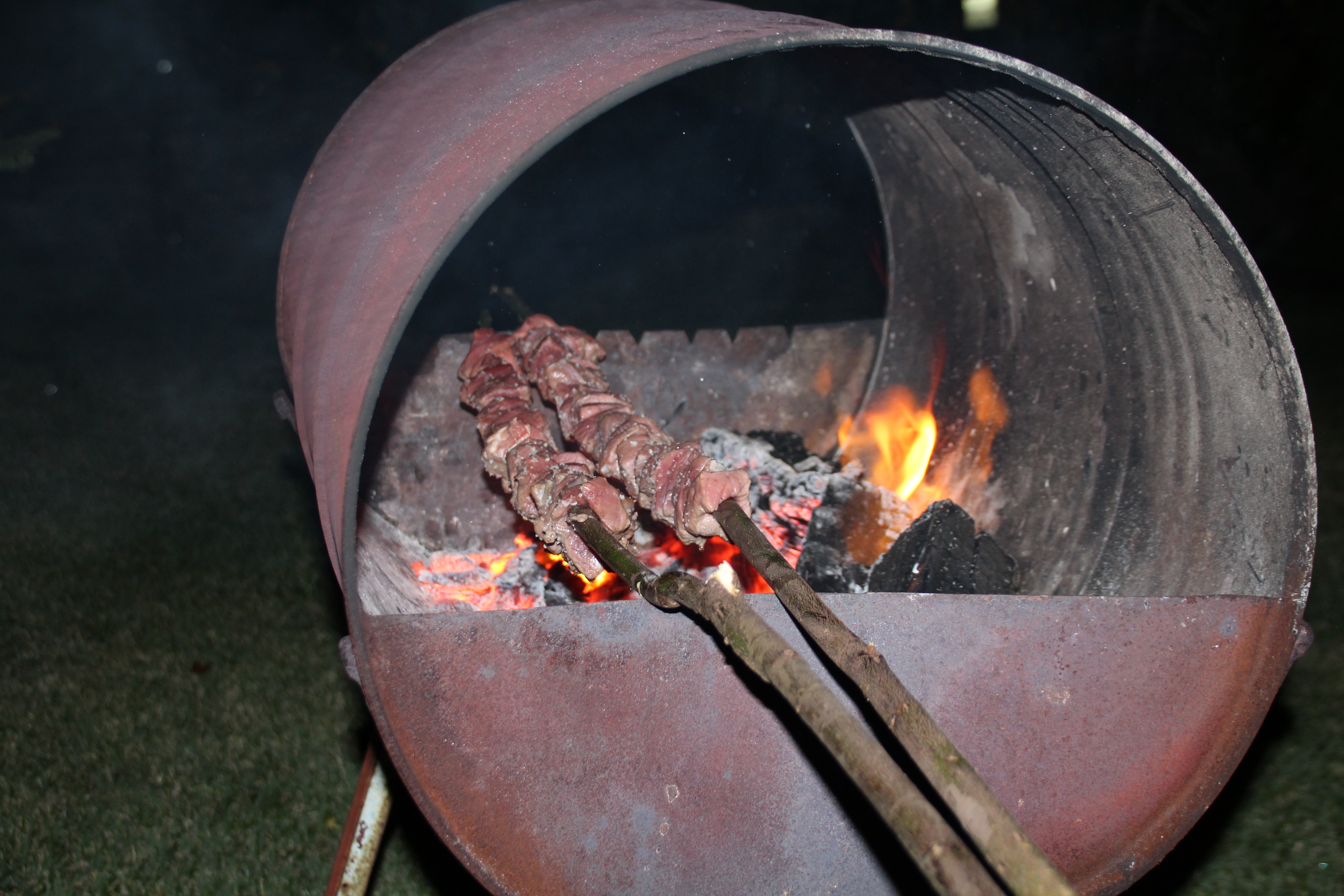
Cooking over embers

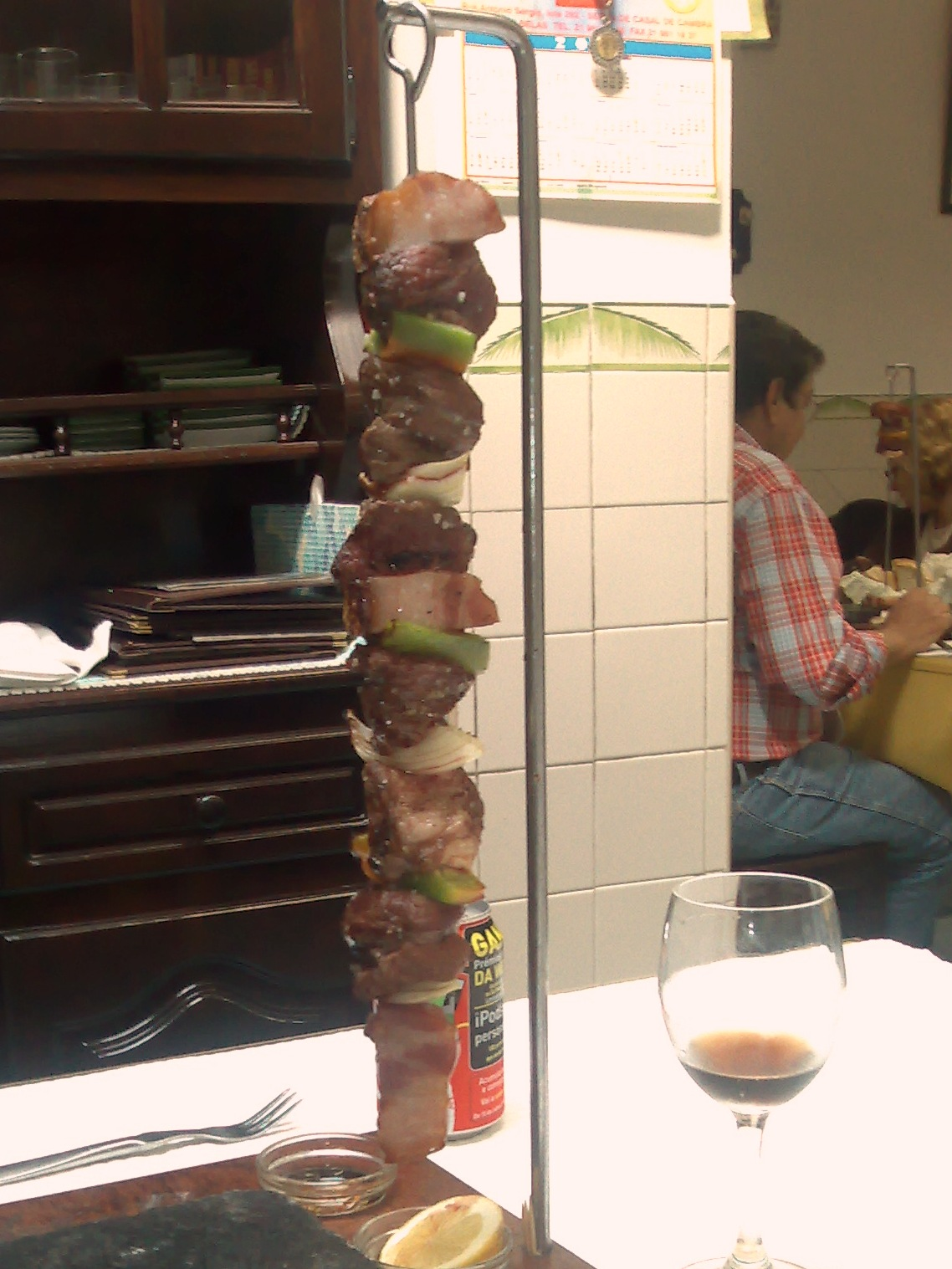
Espetada after being cooked

== See also ==
- List of Portuguese dishes
- Sosatie
