= Manuê =

Varieties of Brazilian cakes

- Type: Cake
- Place of origin: Brazil
- Associated cuisine: Brazilian cuisine
- Main ingredients: Corn and sugar cane molasses

Manuê or manauê refers to several Brazilian cake varieties that have traditionally been made with corn and sugar cane molasses. The corn that is used can either be grinded fresh sweet corn, fubá de moinho (corn fubá), or grinded rehydrated dried corn kernels. Aside from these two primary ingredients, coconut milk, shredded coconut, butter and other cooking fats, cassava, sugar, and wheat flour are sometimes added for special occasions.

Manuê is eaten during breakfast and in the afternoon either by itself or accompanied by a cup of coffee. It can also be found at regional fairs, festivals, and Festa Juninas.

== History ==
The cake is believed to have been developed by Portuguese housewives or enslaved Afro-Brazilians in colonial Brazil who adapted European recipes by using local ingredients. The dish was possibly influenced by beiju, an Indigenous Brazilian cassava or corn flour flatbread cooked on a hot stone.

In the 1983 version of the book História da Alimentação no Brasil (History of Food in Brazil), Luís da Câmara Cascudo wrote that manuê is a popular dessert that is eaten across Brazil and has several variations but that those made with corn are the most popular. Cascudo wrote that the cake was eaten during lanche da tarde and not dessert, is sometimes leavened with yeast or baking soda, and is referred to by various different names. Manague, manávei, manaué, and managão are some other names for variations of this dessert that have been recorded in historic cookbooks.

=== Modern-day variations ===
==== Manuê de bacia ====
Manuê de bacia (Bowl manuê) is a wheat flour and sugar cane molasses cake that is traditional to Paraty, a historic municipality in the Brazilian state of Rio de Janeiro, and is believed to be an adaption of corn-based manuês. Traditional manuê was present in Paraty since its founding, where it was sold by wandering salespeople and featured in cookbooks. The modern-day cake is said to have been adapted by Afro-Brazilians who substituted corn flour for imported wheat flour and added spices like ginger and nutmeg. It would have then gained its name from being baked in rectangular cake trays, which were called bacias (bowls) until the late 1800s.

==== Manuê de milho verde fresco ====
Manuê de milho verde fresco (Fresh sweet corn manuê) is made with coconut milk, shredded coconut, and freshly grinded sweet corn, and is served at certain Festa Juninas in Northeastern Brazil.

==== Mané pelado ====
Mané pelado is a shredded yuca and coconut cake that is traditional to the Center-West and Goiás. In 2023, researchers with Comer História (History of Eating), a project run by the College of Philosophy and Sciences at São Paulo State University, claimed that mané pelado developed from manauê.

==== Other variations ====
Manuê in Fundo de Pasto communities in the Brazilian state of Bahia is made with traditional techniques. Dried milho crioulo, a Brazilian corn landrace, kernels are soaked overnight in warm water, blended, and then mixed with either rapadura, sugar cane molasses, or sugar so that it can be placed in a tray and baked in a wood oven. These manuês are sometimes sold door to door or in fairs and festivals in the Bahian sertão.

Traditional cakes in Northeastern Brazil are sometimes called manuês.
