= Xarém =

Portuguese corn meal soup

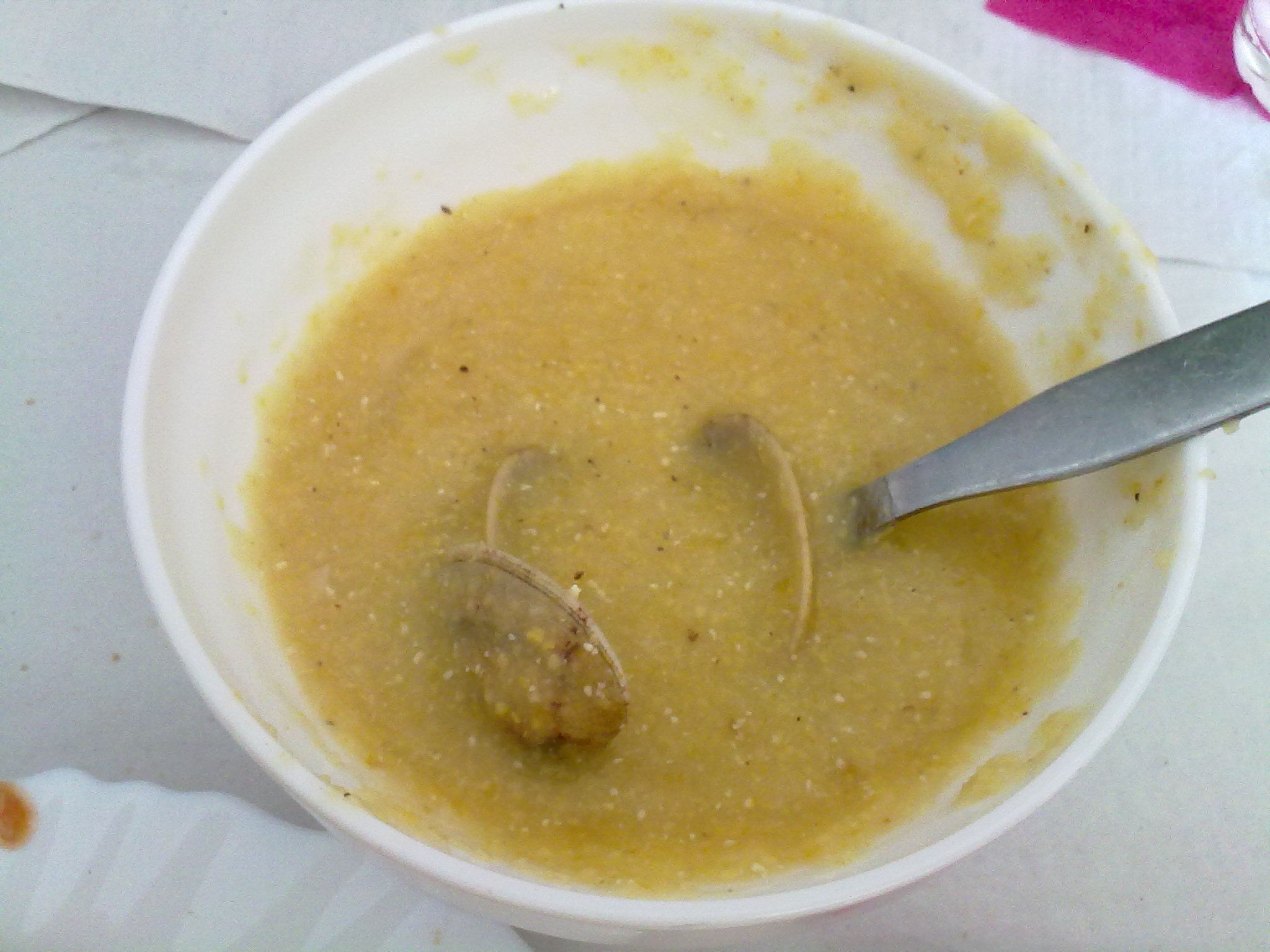
Algarvian xarém, a dish from Portugal

Xarém or xerém is a thick soup or porridge from Algarve, Portugal that is eaten in Cape Verde and Brazil as well. It has a corn flour base combined with other traditional ingredients which vary by region. The dish is prepared using corn meal, clams or sardines, and grilled meats. The Algarvian version is most commonly prepared using clams.

== Etymology ==
The words "xerém" and "xarém" have no known etymological origin, though there are two hypotheses for the origin of the words:

- "xerém" and "xarém" from the Arabic word zerem meaning "grain potatoes".
- "xerém" could be derived from a Yoruba word, xe'ree, meaning a rattle used in Orisha Shango.

== Brazil ==
It is a traditional dish in the Northeast Region of Brazil, especially in Pernambuco. The Brazilian dish contains coarsely ground corn kernels, and it is similar to polenta.

It is also popular in Minas Gerais, where it is not called "xerém" but "little hominy". The name is given to both the raw broken corn, and the cooked dishes made with it. Traditionally, the Mineira hominy is cooked with pork ribs, sometimes with pork cuts or chicken, beef, or sausage added.

== Cape Verde ==
In Cape Verde, xarém is considered a traditional dish. It contains corn grain mixed with water, laurel, butter, and salt. It can also be prepared with fresh tuna, coconut milk, onions, and gindungo peppers. Xerém de festa is prepared with fat, pork meat, and onions, or in other cases, with beans, bay leaf, peppers and tomatoes. It is often used for wedding parties.

On the island of Brava, a drum festival is celebrated in the month of June when the xarém dish is eaten and prepared as people dance to the coladeiras.

== Portugal ==
In Portugal, xarém is a traditional dish in the southern Algarve region, and is quite common in the city of Olhão. In that city, the dish is prepared using clams, bacon, and ham. Other ingredients may include greaves, pork, and grilled sardines. A dish called "xarém with shells" was one of 70 candidates in a September 2011 cook-off for the 'Seven Wonders of Portuguese Cooking' award, but it lost.

== See also ==
- List of Portuguese dishes
- List of soups
- Portuguese cuisine
