= Alivenci =

Traditional Moldavian custard tart

- Type: Custard tart
- Course: Dessert
- Place of origin: Romania, Moldova
- Region or state: Moldavia
- Main ingredients: Milk, cornmeal, cream cheese, smântână, eggs, butter

Alivenci, plural form of alivancă, is a traditional custard tart, from the cuisine of Moldavia made with cornmeal, cream cheese like urdă or telemea and smântână.

A form of cheesecake was very popular in Ancient Greece. The secret of its manufacture was passed during the Roman invasions. At that time, the Latin name used for this type of cake was placenta that was transmitted in Romanian culture.

For Saint Peter, the Moldovan prepare alivenci.
