= Corn relish =

Corn kernel dish

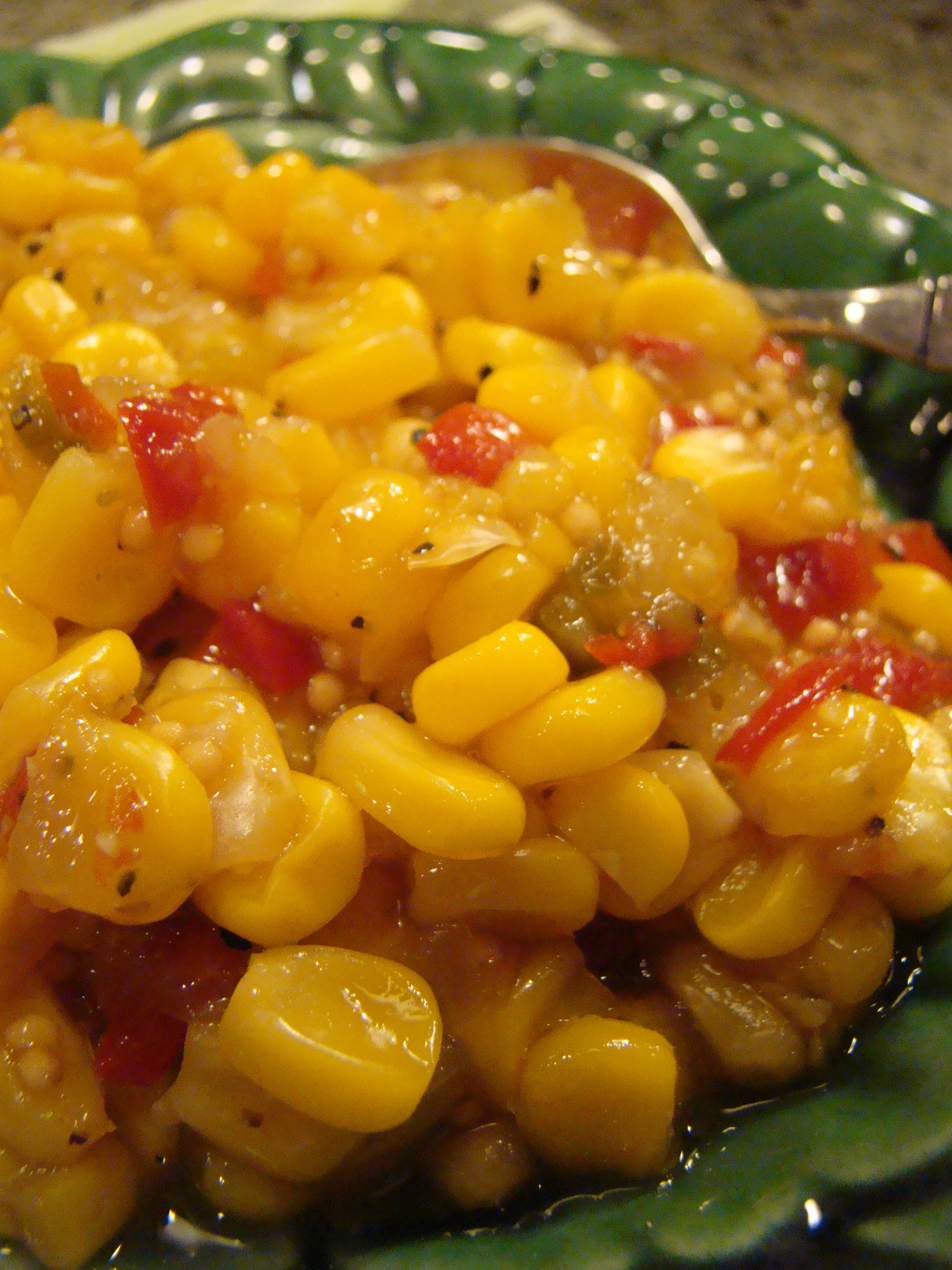
Corn relish

Corn relish is a traditional Southern United States recipe for cooked whole corn kernels, spiced with red and green bell peppers, peppercorns, and equal parts sugar and cider vinegar.

The mixture is placed in glass canning jars and steamed for about 45 minutes in a pressure cooker. During the winter months, canned corn relish is taken from the pantry and opened at the table, given as a garnish or side dish to the typically meat-and-potatoes dinner fare, which in the South, was usually ham and boiled potatoes.

Today, corn relish is simply cooked on the stove, and placed in sterile covered containers and stored in the refrigerator or freezer.

Variations on the recipe include the addition of chopped tomatoes, sliced cucumbers, dill seed, or mustard seed.

== See also ==
- List of maize dishes
