= Milho frito =

Portuguese fried cornmeal dish

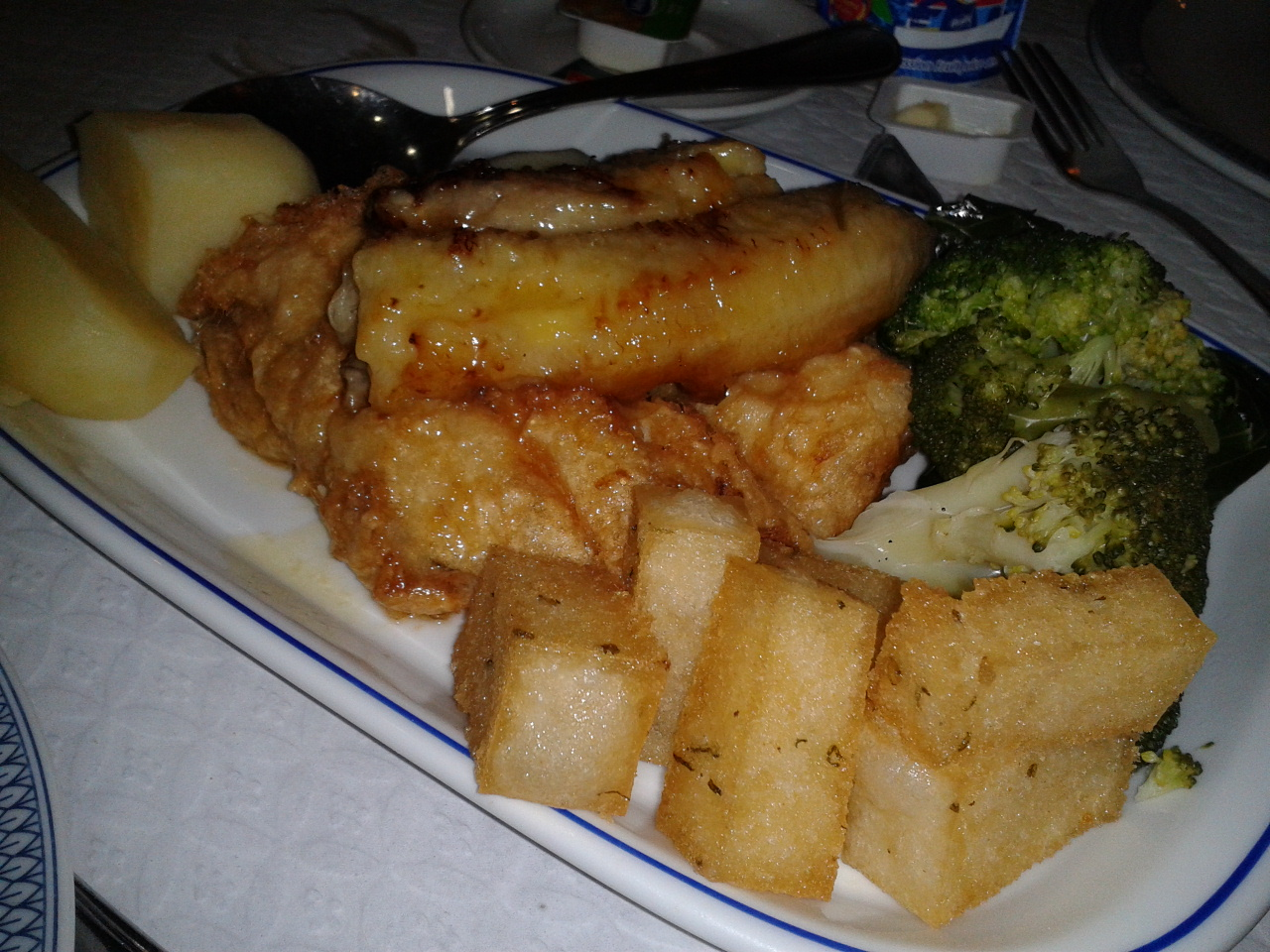
- Milho frito with espada and banana
- Course: Served with main (usually)
- Place of origin: Portugal
- Region or state: Madeira
- Main ingredients: Corn

Milho frito (fried cornmeal in English) is a typical Madeiran side dish made of cornmeal, finely sliced collard greens (although kale is a common substitute), water, garlic, lard and olive oil cooked slowly and cooled into forms. Similar to a very firm polenta, it is cut into cubes and fried. It is usually served with espetada and other regional dishes in Madeira.

== See also ==
- List of maize dishes
