= Visayan white corn =

Variety of corn

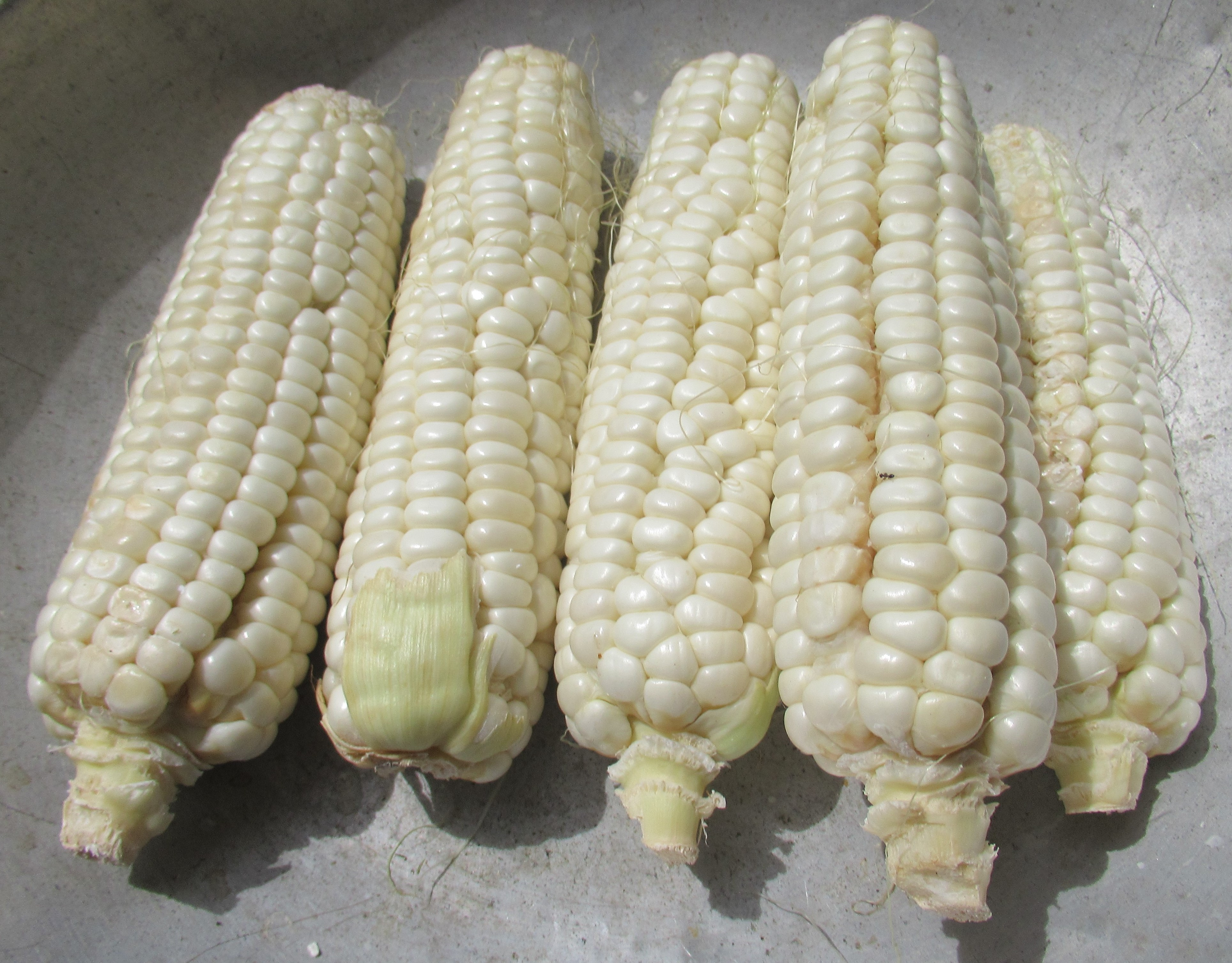
- Visayan white corn
- Species: Zea mays L. var. indurata
- Origin: Philippines (Visayas)

Visayan white corn, also known as Visayan white flint or Tinigib, is an heirloom cultivar of flint corn from the Visayas Islands of the Philippines. It is considered a secondary staple cereal in the Philippines (particularly in the Visayas and Mindanao) after rice.

== Names ==
Visayan white corn is natively known as Tinigib (also spelled Tiniguib), meaning "chisel-shaped" in the Cebuano language, a reference to the shape of the corn kernels. Other less common local names for it include mais bisaya ("Visayan corn"), mais karaan ("heirloom corn"), and mais bundok ("mountain corn"), among others.

Visayan white corn is also known simply as "white corn" (mais puti) to distinguish it from the imported and genetically modified (GM) "yellow corn" varieties (which are generally used for animal feed and further processing and not for direct human consumption, with the exception of sweet corn).

== Description ==
Corn is native to the Americas, but it was introduced early into the Philippines (through Cebu) during the Spanish colonial period (1565–1898). The earliest records of corn crops in the Philippines is from Cebu in the 1700s, though it was probably introduced earlier, along with tobacco and cacao. Through natural selection and human-directed plant breeding over centuries, the introduced corn has developed into multiple local varieties with considerable genetic variability. Visayan white corn is further subdivided into different genetically distinct regional populations. Some of which show potential as genetic resources due to high resistances to pests and diseases.

Visayan white corn is a flint corn-type variety, characterized by a hard waxy covering on the kernels (as opposed to dent corn). Its kernels are predominantly white, though it can sometimes include kernels of a different color (usually red).

== Cultivation and conservation ==
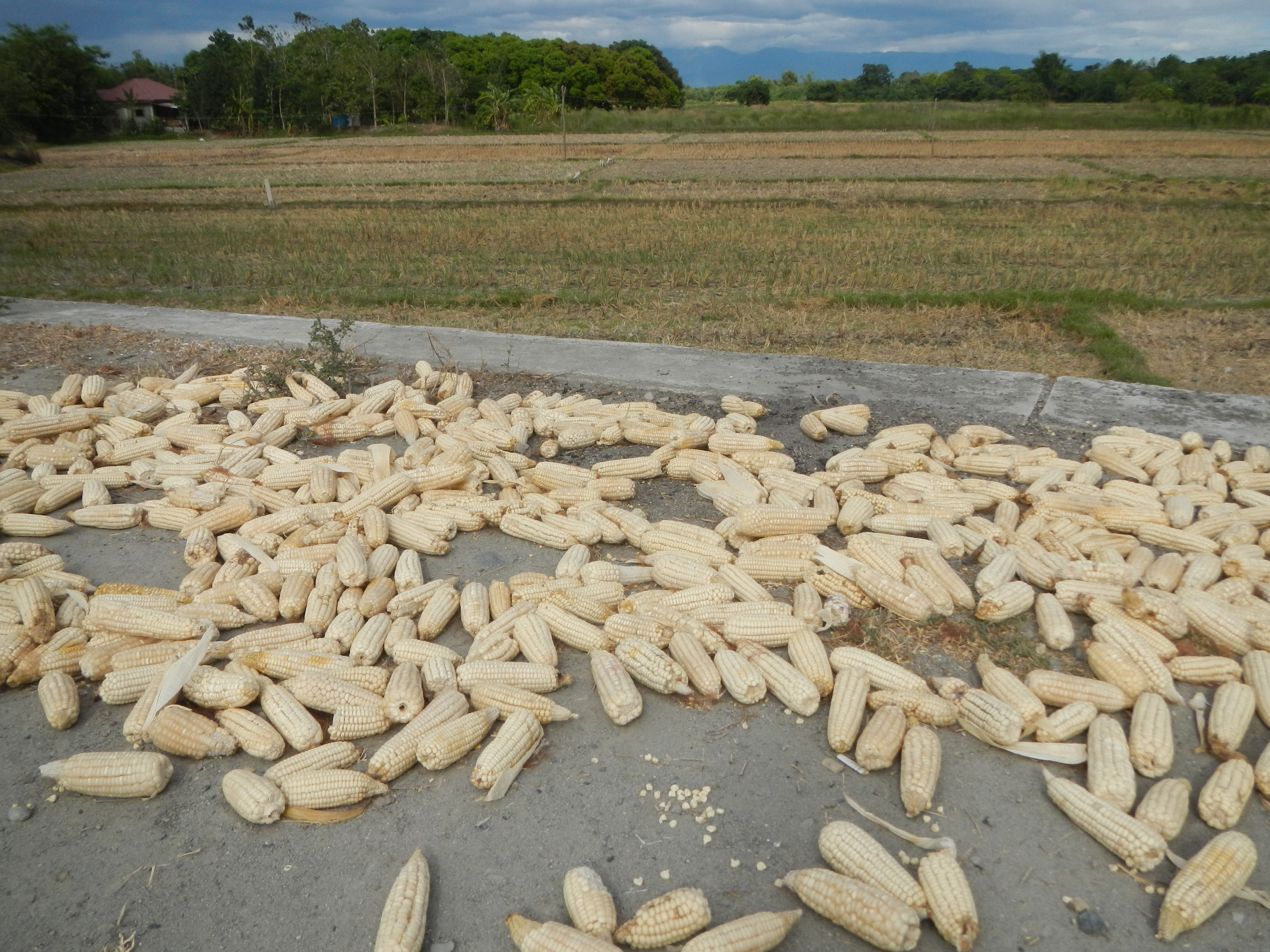
Visayan white corn being dried on a road surface in Pangasinan

Visayan white corn is usually planted in small-scale non-mechanized farms. It is often planted on a subsistence level, wherein the farmers are the ones who directly consume their crops.

Visayan white corn is an openly pollinated variety (OPV) of corn. Seeds from a harvest are saved to plant the next crop, allowing farmers to breed better adapted varieties over time. Despite this, Visayan white corn is increasingly being replaced by genetically modified (GM) yellow corn, due to their higher yields.

In some areas, local Visayan white corn have been hybridized deliberately with transgenic yellow corn varieties since at least 2005; acquiring the patent-protected herbicide-tolerance of the GM corn cultivars while being openly pollinated. The exact origins of these cultivars remain unclear though there are claims that they may have originated from a former employee of biotech companies. These varieties are locally known as 'Sige-sige' (literally "follow-follow", loosely translated to "ongoing" or "continual") or 'Ukay-ukay' ("bargain [seeds]"), and can range in color from white to yellow. Though illegal and ecologically risky, they have become endemic among poverty-stricken smallholder farms in Mindanao and the Visayas, many of whom plant Sige-sige varieties because they can not afford commercial seed prices. They produce lesser yields than true GM cultivars, but have stacked herbicide-resistance traits that are stable across generations.

== Uses ==
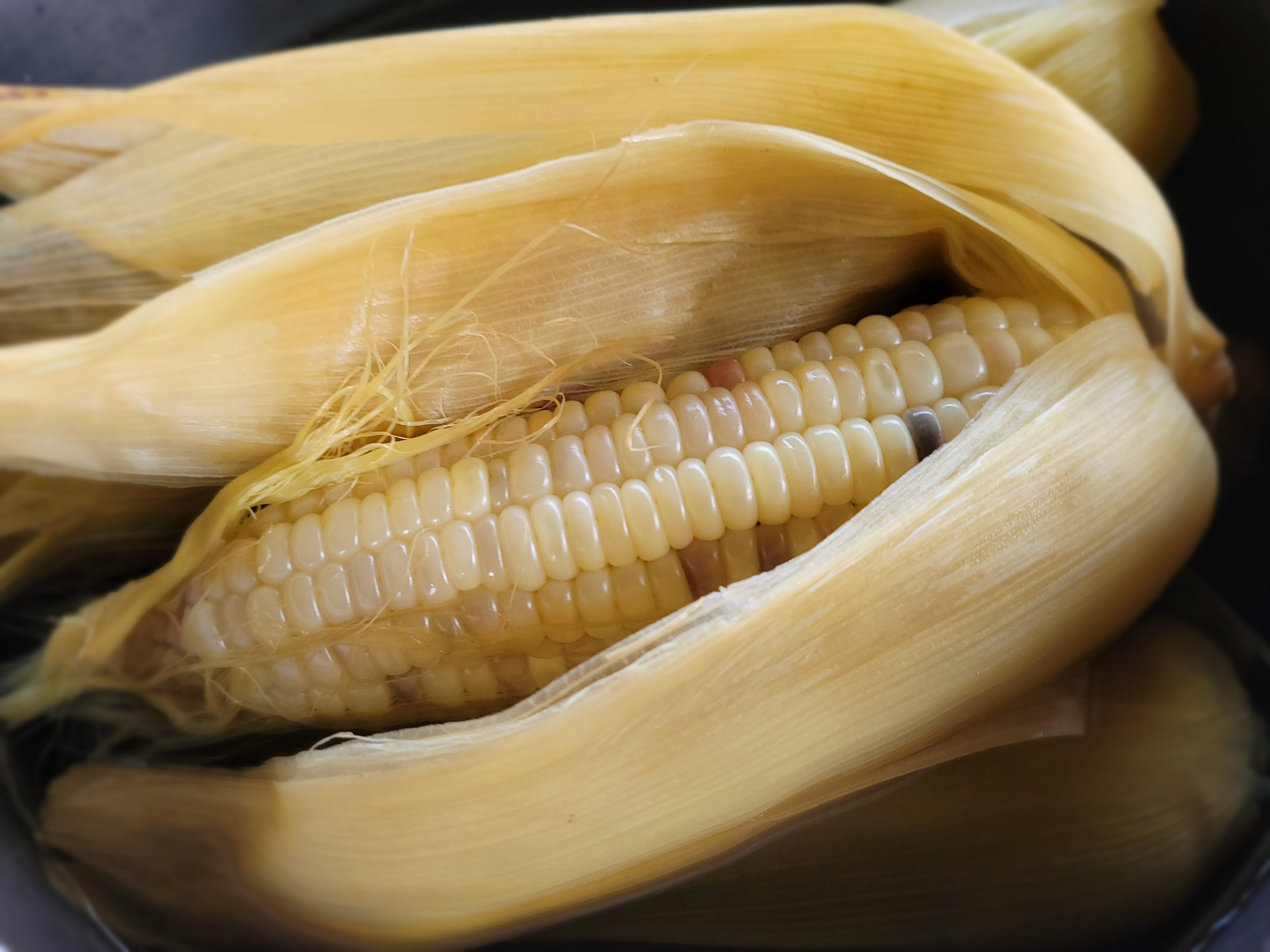
Tilaob, boiled Visayan white corn on the cob, from Bukidnon

Visayan white corn can be eaten directly on the cob after boiling. It usually uses slightly immature corncobs (which are still soft) and are known as tilaob (also linung-ag nga mais or kinayu in certain regions). Slightly immature corncobs can also be grilled directly over hot coals, and are known as sinugba nga mais or inanag nga mais.

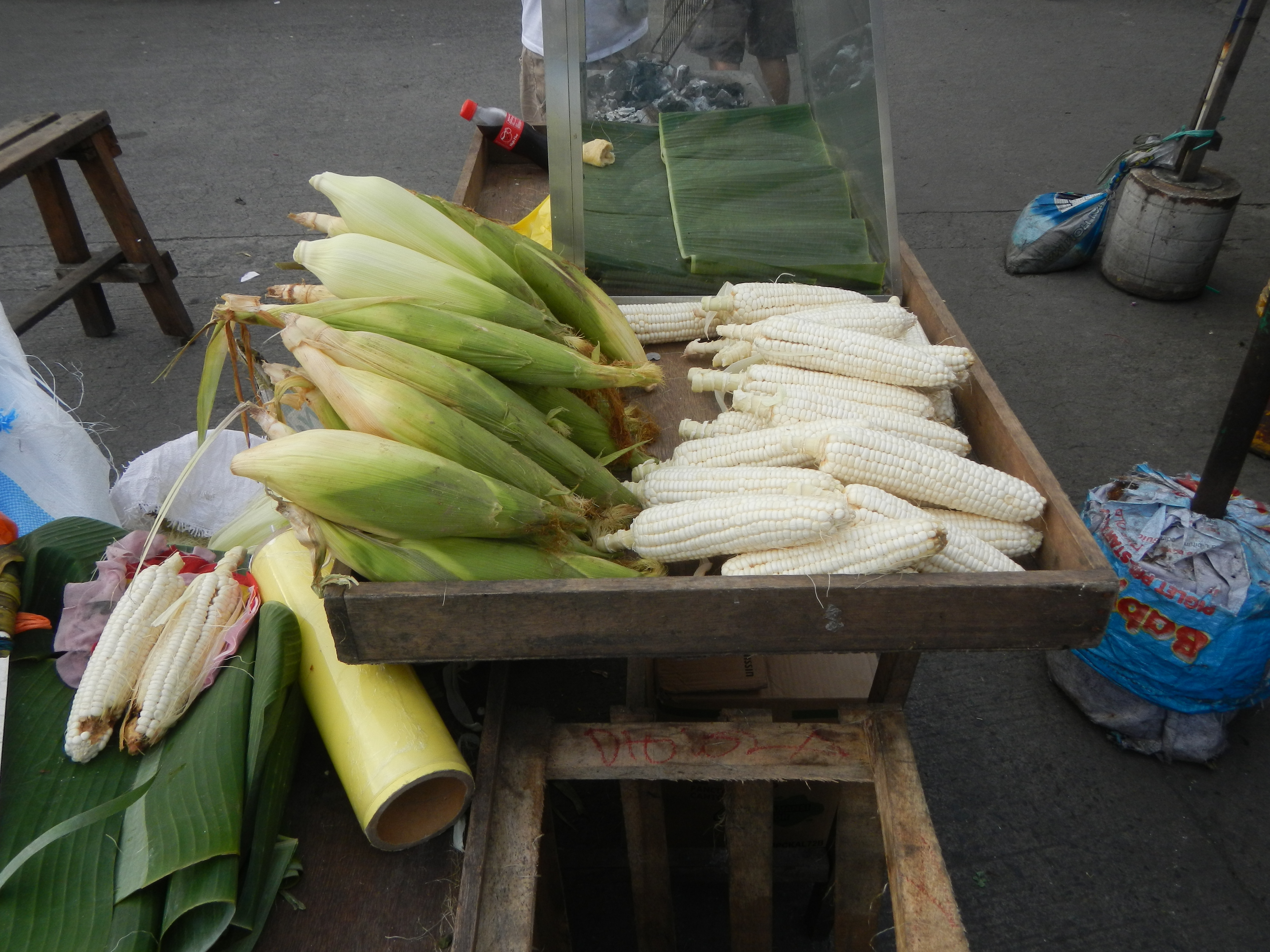
Young Visayan white corn being prepared for grilling in Manila

Visayan white corn is also used as an ingredient in traditional desserts (kakanin) like maja blanca and pintos and dishes like suam na mais. It can also be processed and fried as cornick. Bugas mais can also be boiled with sugar to produce a sweet porridge called tinughong (a term which also applies to sweet rice porridges). It can also be roasted and ground to produce a drink resembling coffee known as kape mais or corn coffee.

=== Bugas mais ===
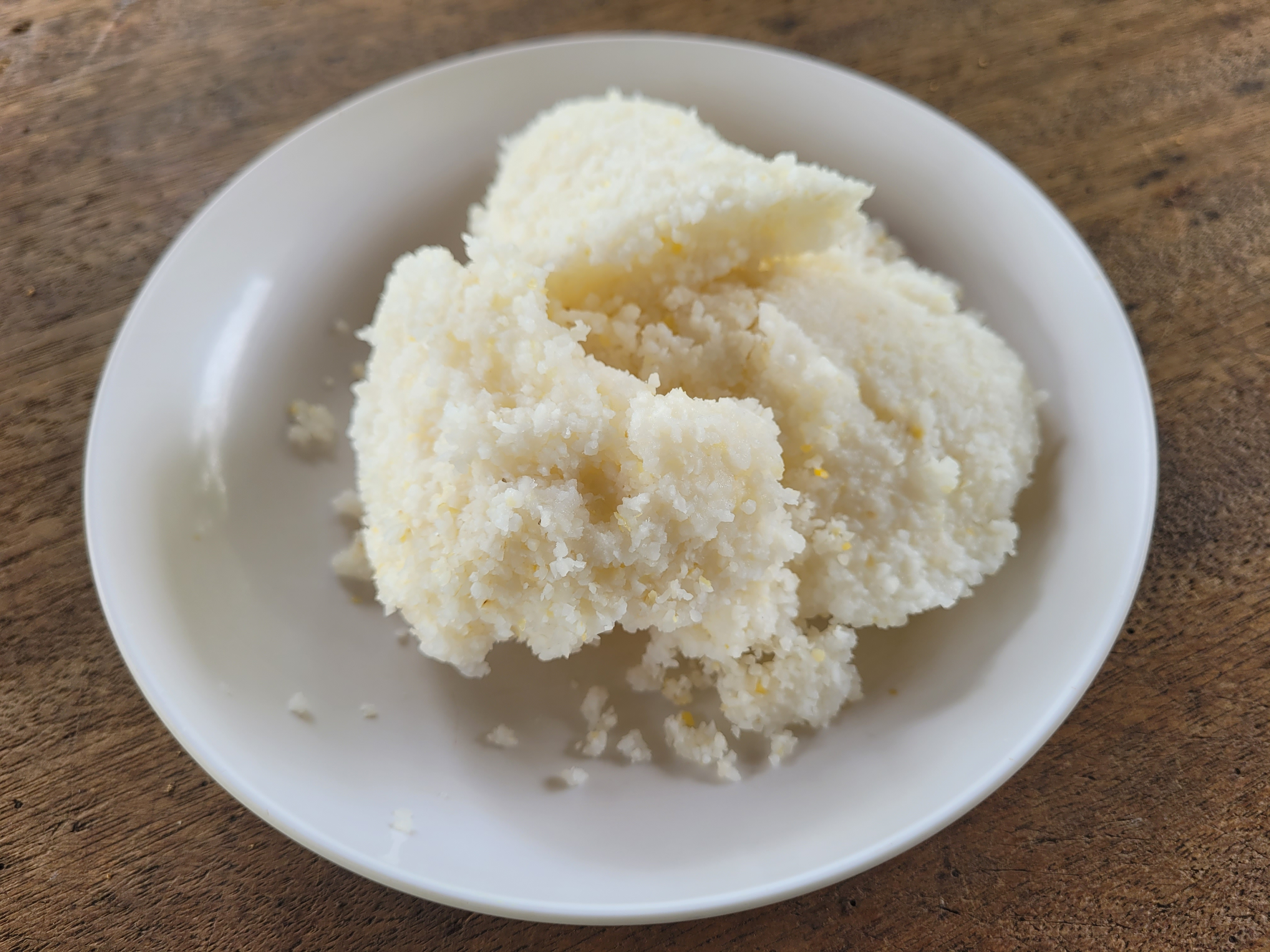
Bugas mais, a common rice alternative and a secondary staple cereal in the Philippines

Dried and coarsely ground Visayan white corn (cornmeal or grits) are eaten as an alternative to steamed white rice, due to its slightly sweet flavor similar to rice. It is known as bugas mais (Cebuano for "milled corn grains"). It is widely considered to be poverty food due to its relative cheapness. Bugas mais is considered a secondary staple food in the Philippines after white rice. It is a staple for around 20% of the Filipino population, particularly in farming regions in Visayas and Mindanao.

Cooking bugas mais is more laborious than cooking white rice because it requires constant stirring to achieve a softer consistency. The action of stirring bugas mais is known as buyok in Cebuano. Another way of improving the texture of bugas mais is to mix it in with white rice as an "extender".

In recent years, bugas mais has gained popularity as a healthy alternative to rice. Visayan white corn has higher nutrition but has a much lower glycemic index in comparison to rice, meaning it digests slower, allowing a more gradual release of glucose into the bloodstream.

== See also ==
- Lagkitan corn
