= Cornick (food) =

Filipino deep-fried crunchy corn snack

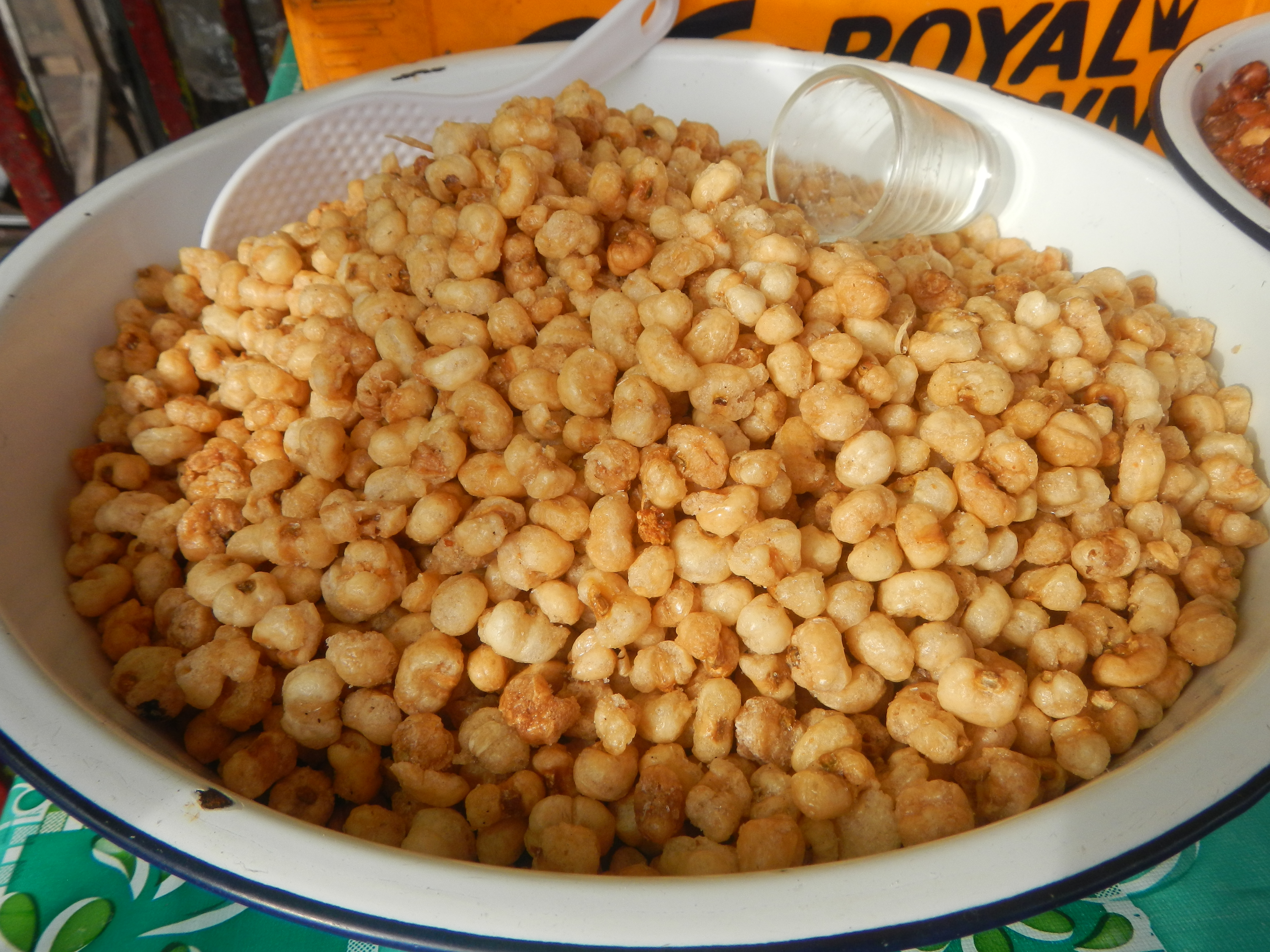
- Alternative names: Kornik, cornic, kornix, kornics, cornicks
- Course: Snack
- Place of origin: Philippines
- Serving temperature: Room temperature
- Main ingredients: Lagkitan corn
- Variations: Chichacorn

Cornick (Filipino: kornik) is a Filipino deep-fried crunchy puffed corn nut snack. It is most commonly garlic-flavored but can also come in a variety of other flavors. It is traditionally made with Lagkitan glutinous corn.

== Description ==
Cornick is made by soaking corn kernels in water for three days, changing the water used for soaking daily. The corn variety used is traditionally Lagkitan glutinous corn (also known mais malagkit or mais pilit), but other types of corn can also be used, including popcorn. After soaking, the kernels are drained and dried thoroughly. It is then deep-fried in oil at about 120 to 130 °C (248 to 266 °F), to ensure that the kernels do not pop. It is cooked for around two to three minutes then drained on paper towels.

Cornick is traditionally seasoned with salt and toasted garlic. Commercial variants are available in a larger variety of flavors including adobo, chili, cheese, and barbecue flavors.

== Variations ==
Chichacorn, a portmanteau of "chicharron" and "corn", is a variant of cornick originating from the Ilocos region. It differs from cornick in that it is allowed to partially pop during frying.

== Commercial versions ==
Mass-produced cornick snacks are widespread in the Philippines. The most popular commercial brands include Boy Bawang, Super Bawang, Bawang na Bawang, and Safari. It is also a common ingredient in Filipino mixed nuts snacks which include brands like Ding Dong and Corn Bits.

== See also ==
- Binatog
- Ampaw
- Pinipig
- List of maize dishes
