= Jipang =

Jipang may refer to:

- Jipang, one of the names of Japan
- Duchy of Jipang, a 16th-century dukedom, vassal of Demak Sultanate, today located in Cepu district, Blora regency, Central Java, Indonesia
- Jipang, Central Java, a village in Cepu district, Blora regency, Indonesia
- Jipang (food), traditional Indonesian-Chinese snack
