= Jipang (food) =

Asian rice snack

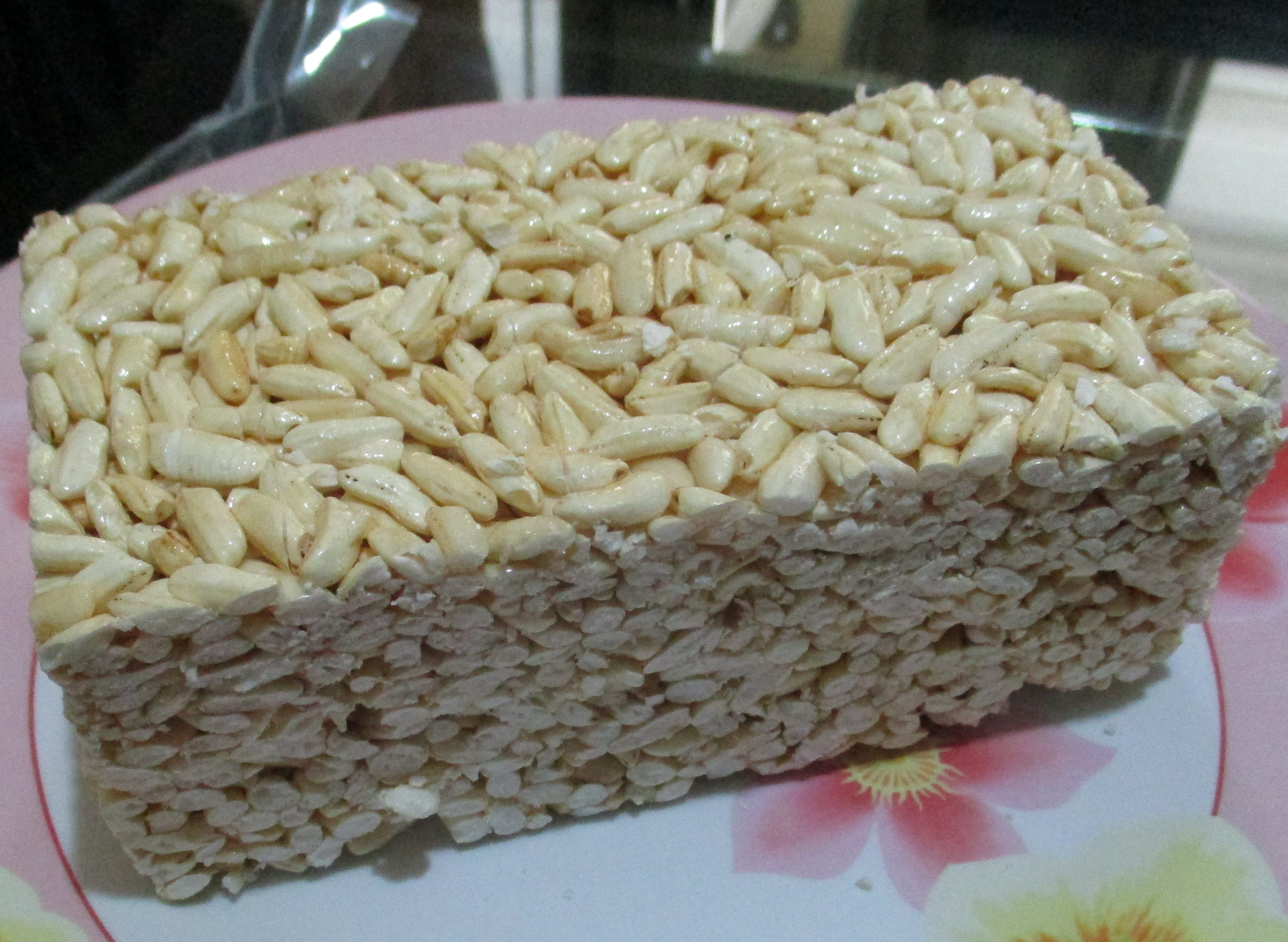
- Rice jipang
- Alternative names: Bipang, berondong beras
- Course: Snack
- Place of origin: Malaysia, Indonesia, China, Taiwan
- Region or state: Southeast Asia, China, Taiwan
- Main ingredients: Rice, glutinous rice, sugar

Jipang is a traditional snack made out of rice or glutinous rice. This traditional snack is also sometimes called bipang or berondong beras.

== History ==
The word bipang is taken from Hokkien bí-phang (米芳; pinyin Mandarin = mǐ fāng), which means "rice which is fragrant or aromatic", refers to it being a confection. Jipang is one of the most popular traditional snacks from China. Chinese immigrants introduced and sold jipang in Indonesia as a snack. A few of these traditional jipang businesses are still active; one of these is Toko Bipang Jangkar in Pasuruan, East Java which has operated continuously since 1940.

== Making process ==
The process of making jipang varies from place to place and even from family to family because jipang is such a widespread snack. Adding onto that, the processes used in the large-scale production of jipang vary largely from the traditional way of making it.

The main ingredients in making jipang is rice and sugar. The best rice for making jipang comes from unhulled rice which has been stored for 3-4 days. According to major jipang producers, jipang is most sought after in the monsoon seasons instead of summer where sales drop. The reason for this is that people tend to avoid snacks that make them thirsty in the summer months.

The making of jipang in major factories usually utilizes highly specified equipment where the rice is roasted over a high-pressure gas stove or gas burner. Next, the rice is popped and mixed with caramelized sugar to give it the sweet flavor traditional jipang has. Before it hardens, the mixture is laid on a table and cut to size for packaging.

In Lahat, South Sumatra, jipang is popular in the lebaran season where the making process of the jipang differs from the methods used in major factories. The jipang from Lahat is made manually from glutinous rice. This unique jipang is also washed, submerged, covered with brown sugar, and dried under the sun before it is finally fried.

== See also ==
- Ampaw
