= Puffed grain =

Type of food

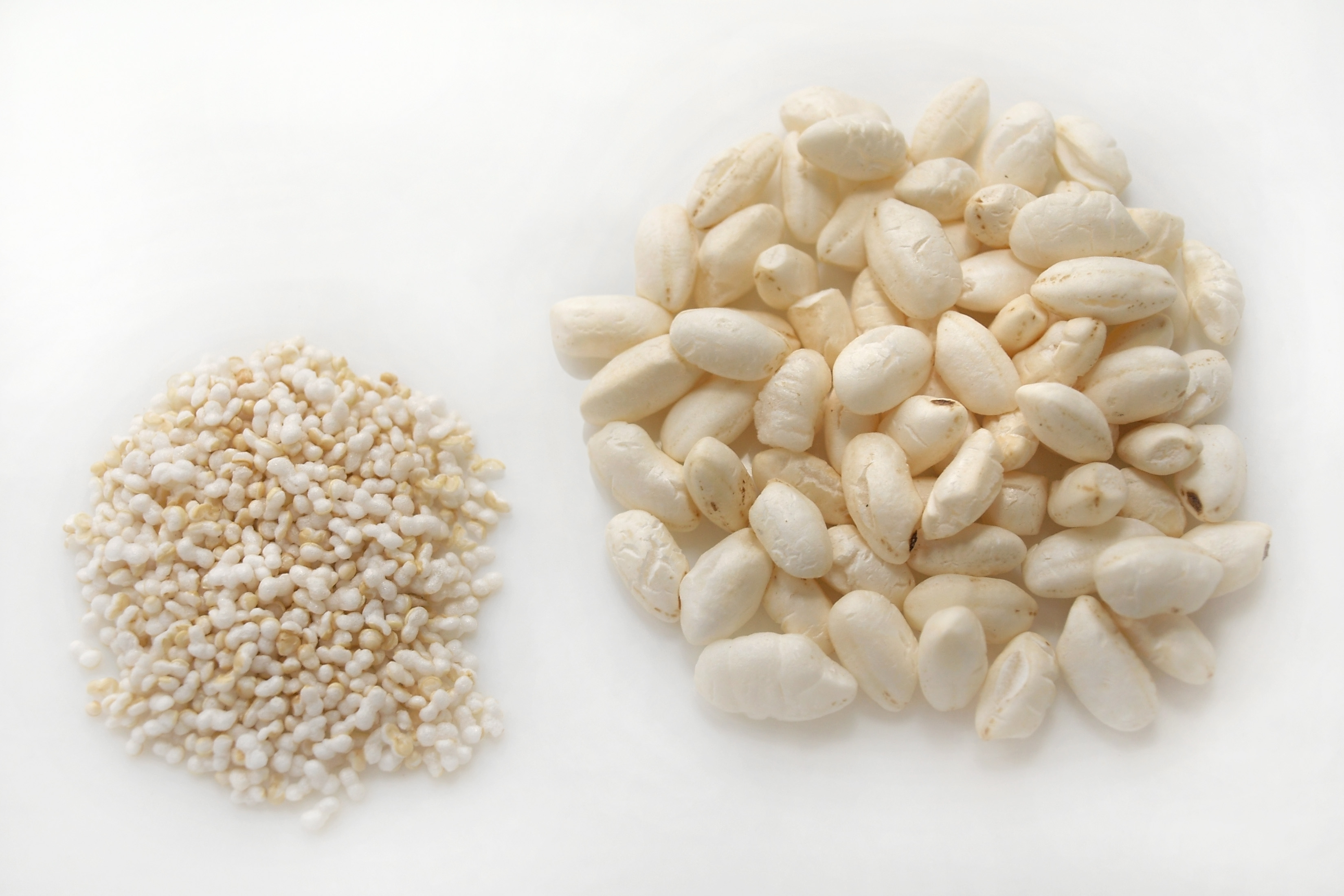
Puffed amaranth (left) and rice (right)

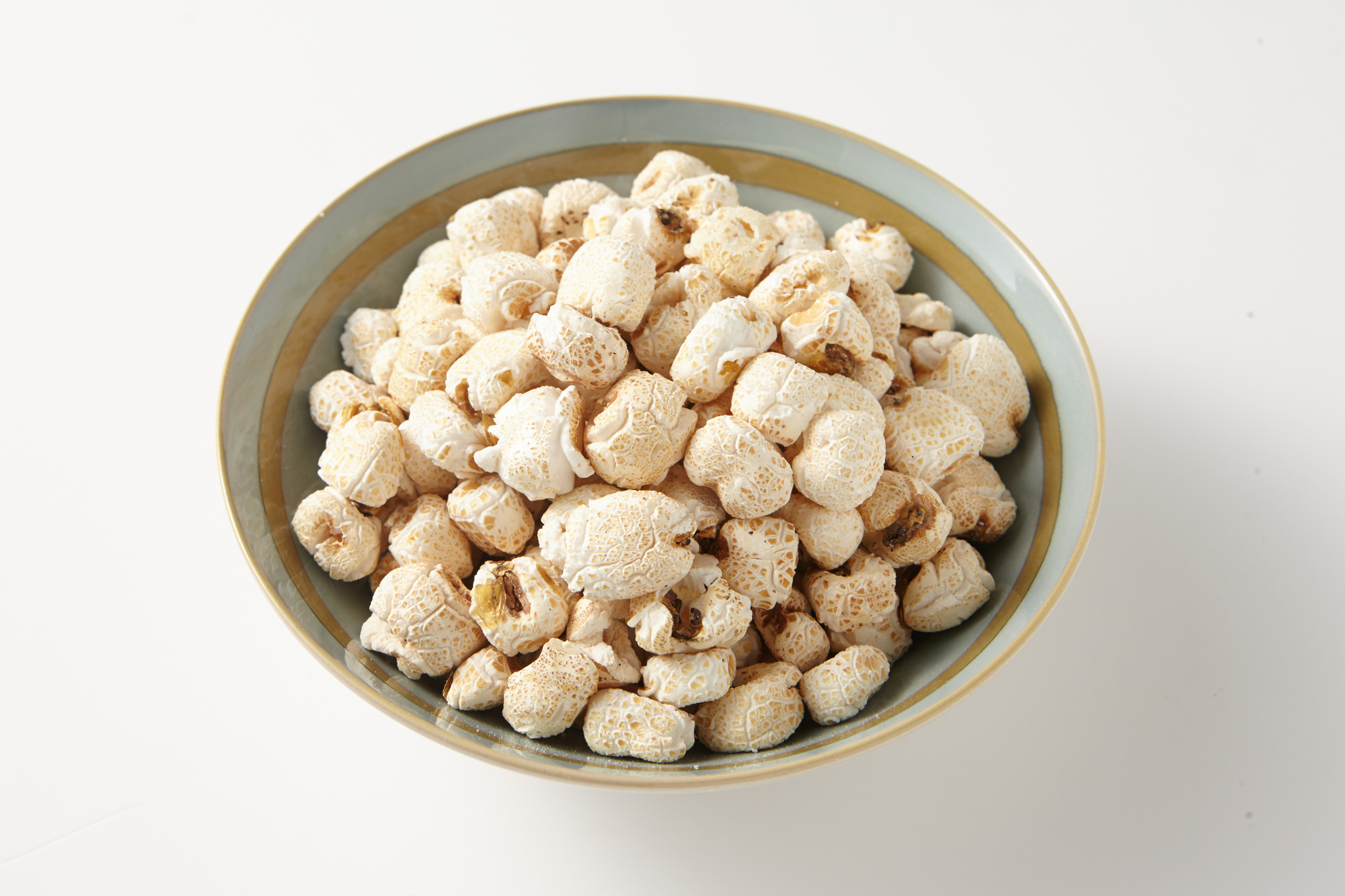
Puffed corn

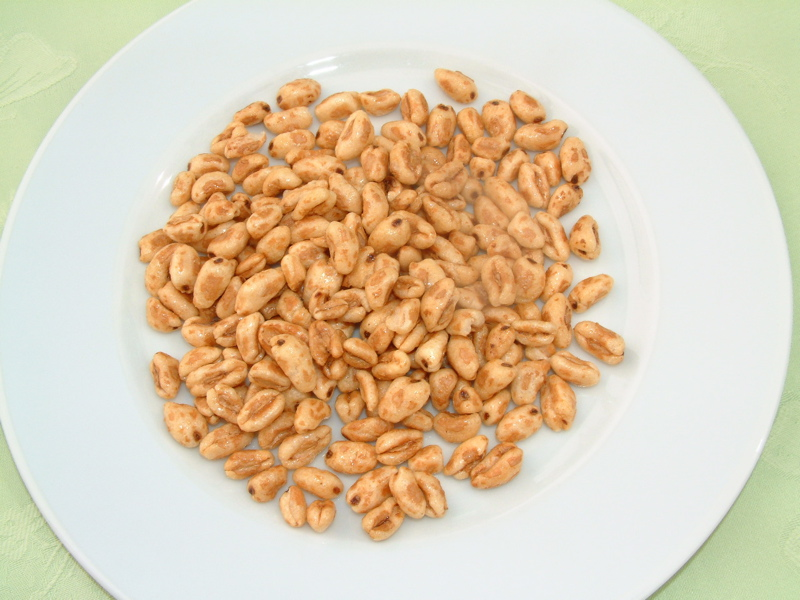
Puffed wheat

Puffed grains are grains that have been expanded ("puffed") through processing. They have been made for centuries with the simplest methods like popping popcorn. Modern puffed grains are often created using high temperature, pressure, or extrusion.

People eat puffed grains in many ways, but it can be as simple as puffed grain alone and with sugar or salt for taste. Commercial products such as corn flakes and Corn Pops mix many ingredients into a homogeneous batter. The batter is then formed into shapes then toasted or extruded. This causes them to rise, but not puff or pop. Puffed grains can be healthful if plain, but when other ingredients are mixed with them they may lose some of their health benefits.

Puffed grains are popular as breakfast cereals and in the form of rice cakes. While it is easy to recognize that cereals came from whole grains, the expansion factor for rice cakes is even greater, and the final product is somewhat more homogeneous.

== History ==
In 1948 and 1950, ears of popcorn, up to 4,000 years old, were discovered by Harvard anthropology graduate student Herbert W. Dick and Harvard botany graduate student Earle Smith, in a complex of rock shelters, dubbed the "Bat Cave", in Catron County, west-central New Mexico, the oldest puffed grain known. These pieces of puffed grain were smaller than a penny to two inches in size and can be made in a similar way to popping popcorn.

Rice has been puffed since ancient times using a technique called hot salt frying in which parboiled rice (e.g. steamed and then dried) is puffed by preheated salt.

In 1901, the modern process of making puffed grains was invented by Dr. Alexander P. Anderson in Red Wing, Minnesota. He was doing an experiment dealing with the effect of heat and pressure on corn starch granules where he put them in six glass tubes, sealed them, and put them in an oven until they changed color. When Dr. Anderson took them out and cracked them open an explosion happened; he had made the corn starch turn into a puffed, white mass.

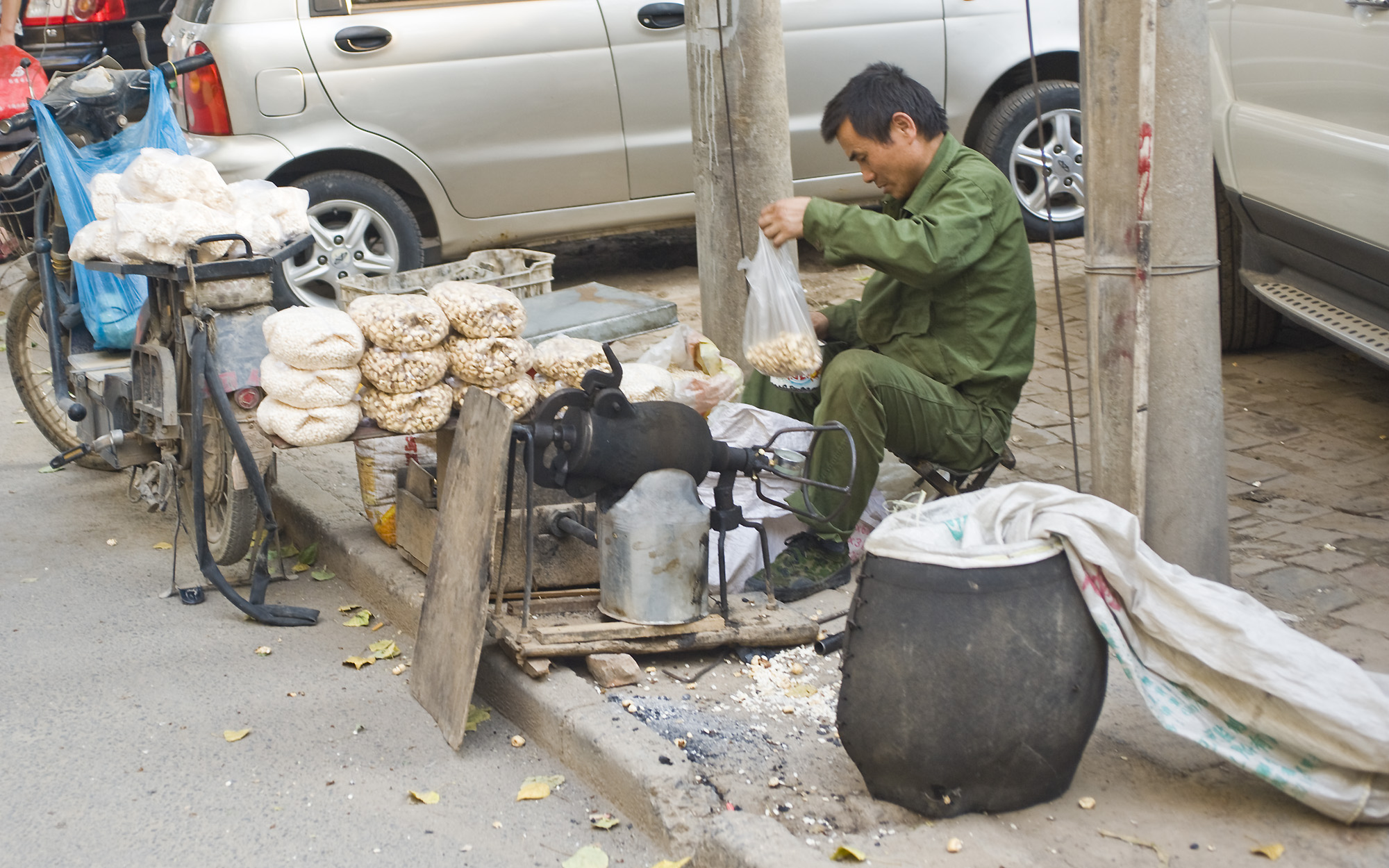
A popcorn "cannon" seen in Taiyuan, China

In the 1930s, Anderson’s invention was adapted as the Chinese Popcorn cannon. Anderson's invention was designed for industrial food manufacturing, and unsuitable for street vendors. The device is a teardrop-shaped pressure cooking pot. The history of grain-puffing in Asia remaines unverifiable. and photographed by Scottish missionary couple Ian and Rachel Morrison in 1938, years before Yoshimura completed her invention. It's unknown how portable popcorn cannons were introduced to China in the 1930s and the prevalence of such devices. Another photo in China showed the machine under inspection by an American officer in a military supply factory in Chongqing. As similar machines were introduced to South Korea by the United States in the 1950s, Xiaomeng Liu theorized that the portable popcorn cannon was likely invented in the United States and subsequently introduced to East Asian countries. However, there is no definitive proof available. According to University of Hong Kong researcher Xiaomeng Liu and Chinese media, The original invention was likely spread to other European countries around World War I to improve the longevity of the food under difficult conditions.

In 1940s, Yoshimura Toshiko (吉村利子) heard German people were using old cannons to puff grain; thus, she designed a portable grain-puffing device called Pongashi ki (ポン菓子機) in 1944 to 1945.

== Manufacture ==
Video showing process using large corn kernels in a roadside machine sometimes called a "popcorn hammer" in Haikou, Hainan, China.

Puffed rice can be produced using the simple but effective method of hot salt frying. Salt is heated in a pan until it is hot enough to pop rice added to it within seconds. Parboiled or dried pre-cooked rice is added to the heated contents of the pan and stirred. Puffing starts almost immediately and completes in less than a minute and the rice is scooped out by a sieve.

High pressure puffed grain is created by placing whole grains under high pressure with steam in a containment vessel. When the vessel's seal is suddenly broken, the entrained steam then flashes and bloats the endosperm of the kernel, increasing its volume to many times its original size.

Puffed rice or other grains are occasionally found as street food in China, Korea (called "ppeong twigi" 뻥튀기), and Japan (called "pon gashi" ポン菓子), where hawkers implement the puffing process using an integrated pushcart/puffer featuring a rotating steel pressure chamber heated over an open flame. The great booming sound produced by the release of pressure serves as advertising.

Manufacturing puffed grain by venting a pressure chamber is essentially a batch process. To achieve large-scale efficiencies, continuous-process equipment has been developed whereby the pre-cooked cereal is injected into a high pressure steam chamber. It then exits the steam chamber via a Venturi tube to an expansion chamber, where the puffed cereal is collected and conveyed to the next process step. These devices, generally called stream puffing machines, were perfected in the latter half of the 20th century in Switzerland and Italy, but are now available from manufacturers in China as well.

== List of puffed food ==
=== Puffed grain foods ===
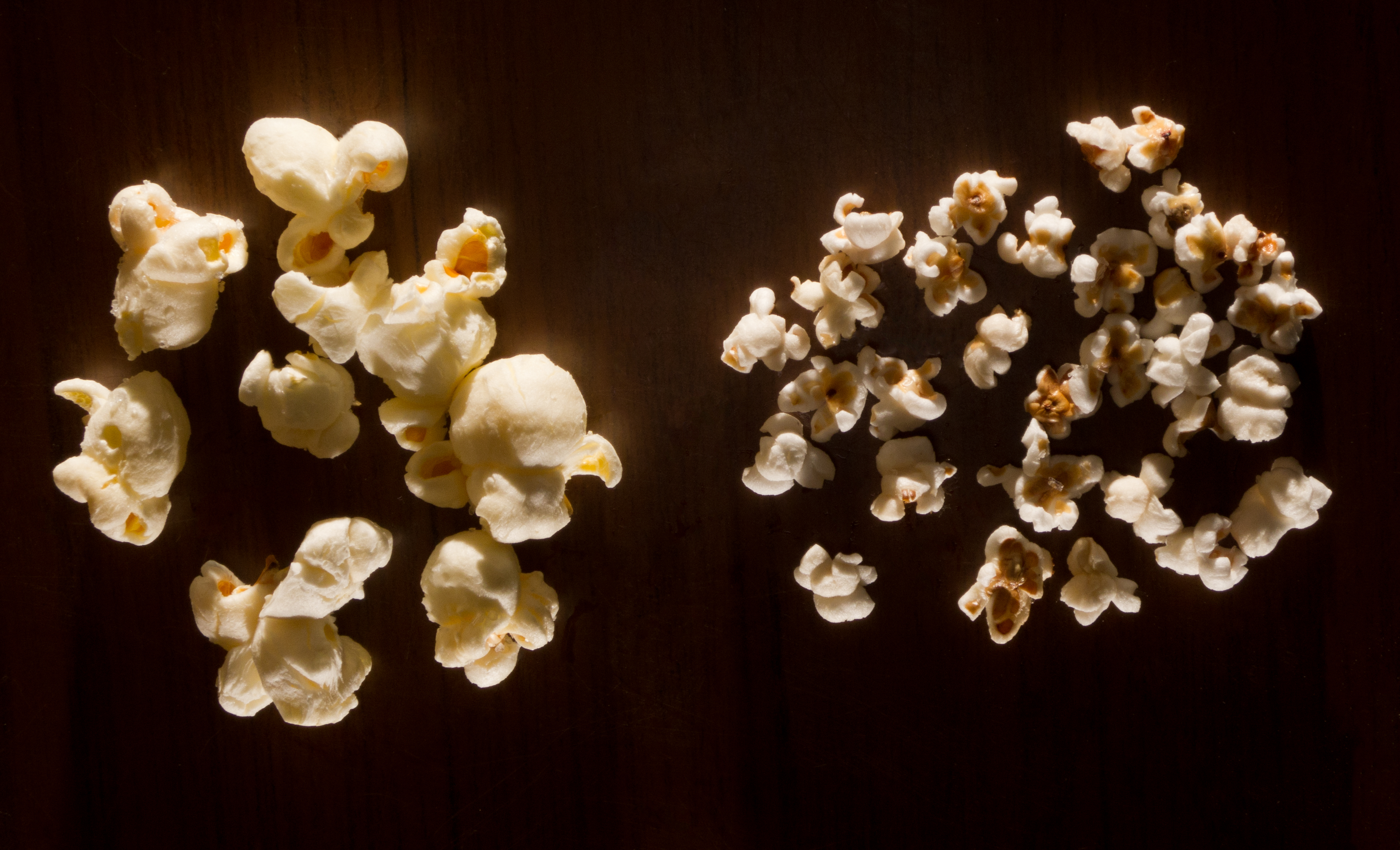
Popcorn (left) and popped sorghum (right)

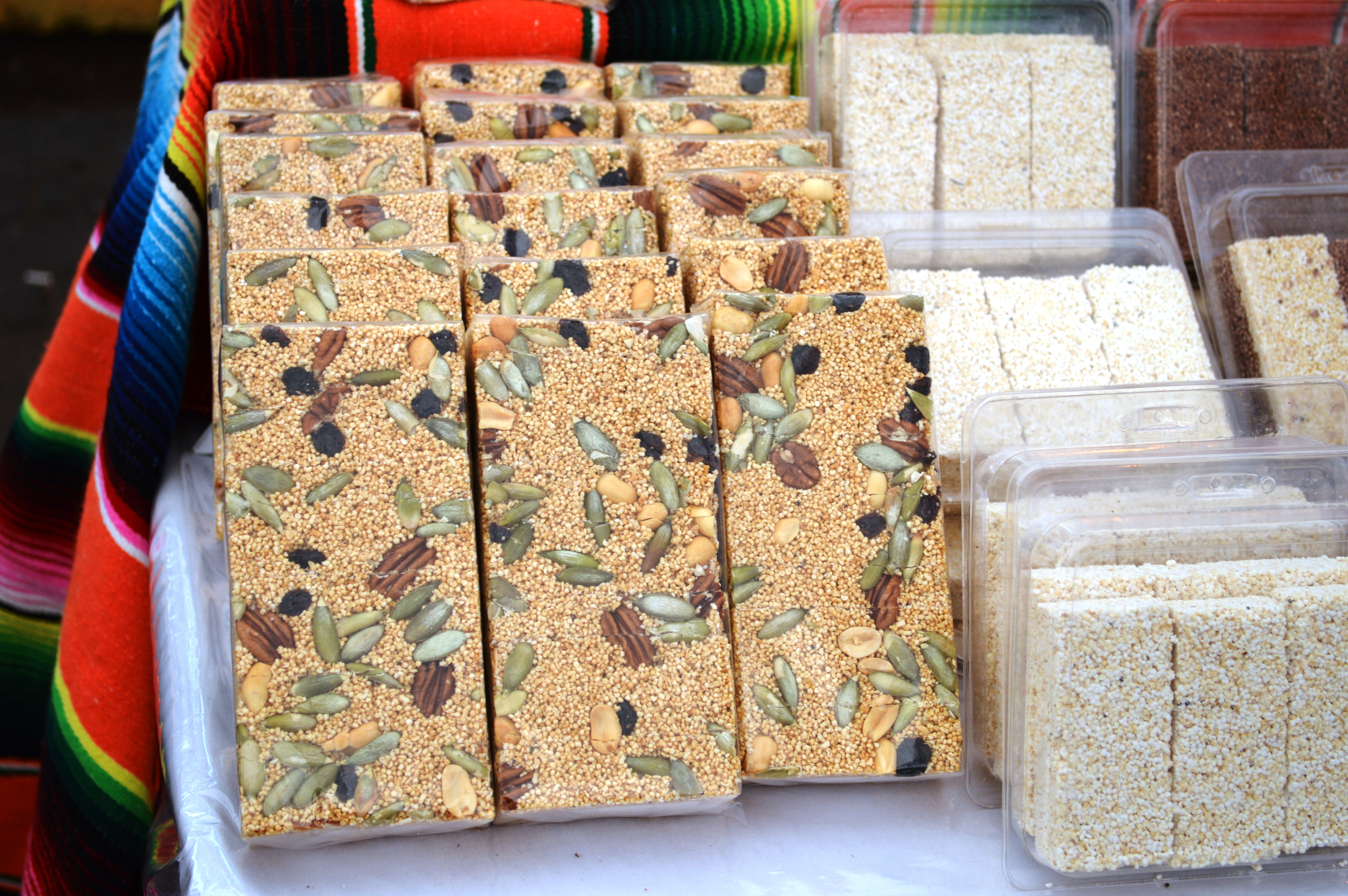
Mexican alegría bars made from puffed amaranth seeds

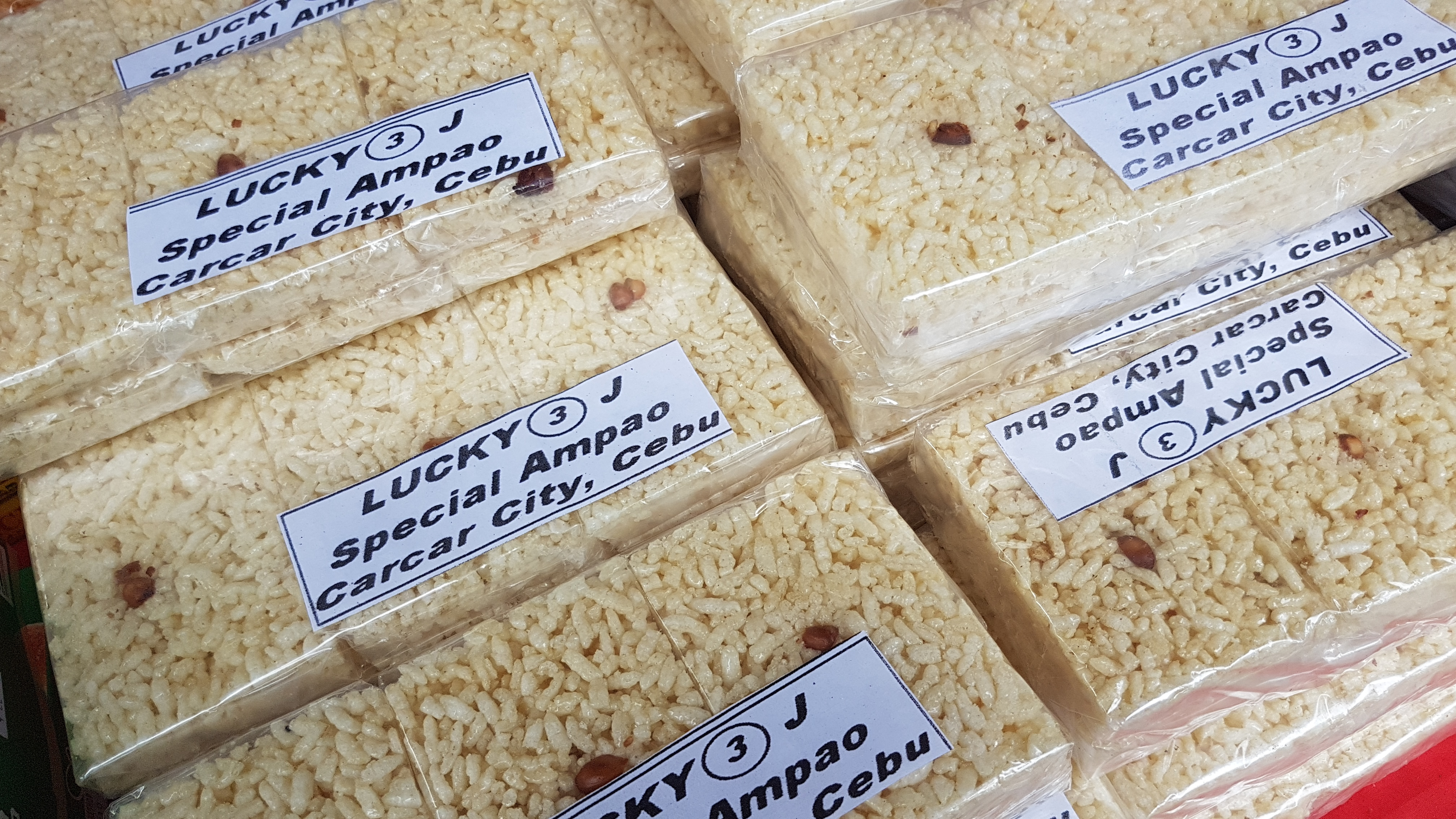
Filipino ampaw bars made from puffed rice

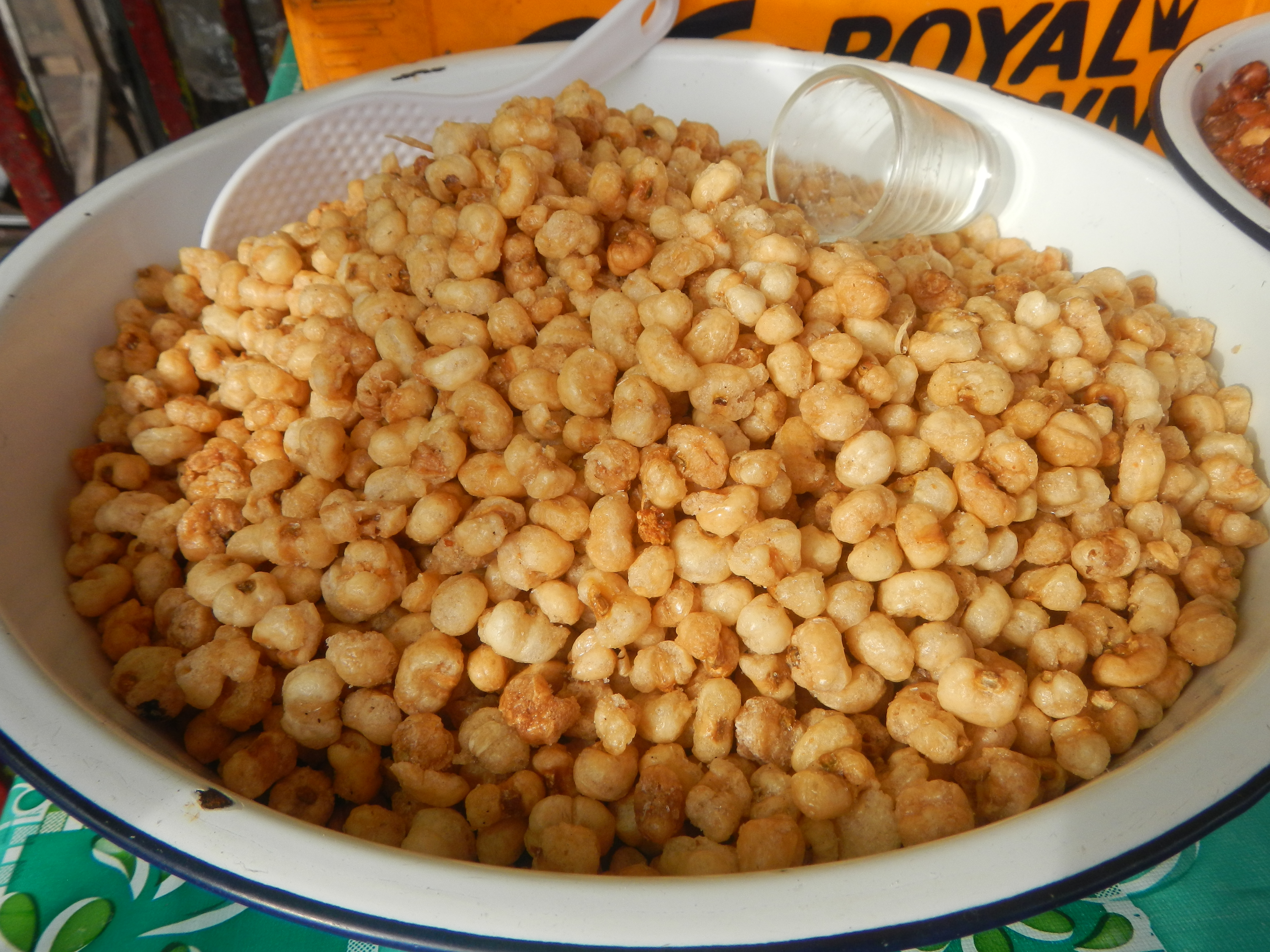
Filipino cornick made from glutinous corn

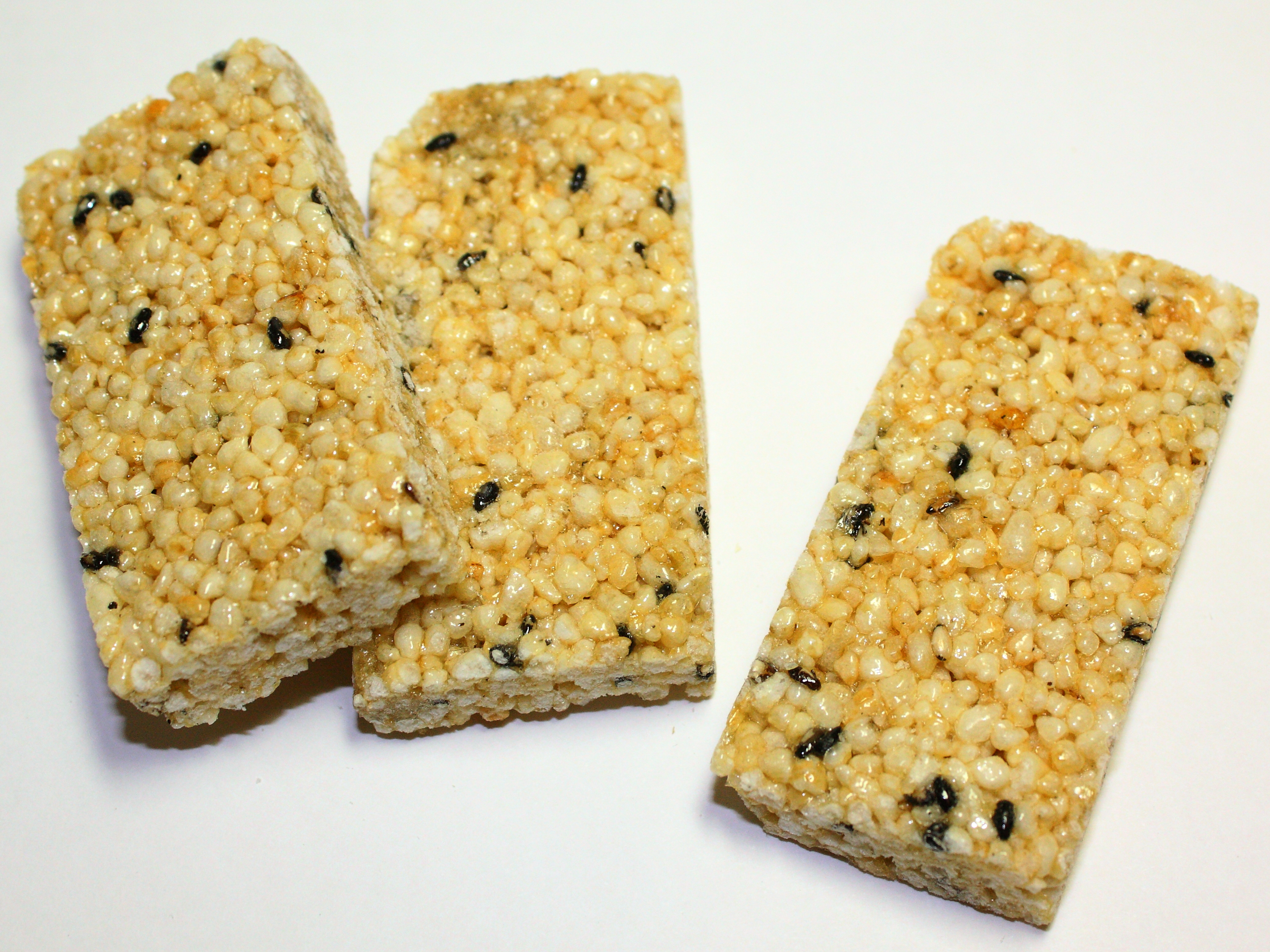
Awaokoshi, puffed millet sweets from East Asia

Snacks and food products made from puffed grain include:

- Amaranth
  - Alegría – Mexico
- Corn (maize)
  - Cornick - Philippines
  - Corn nut - North America
  - Pasankalla - Bolivia
  - Popcorn
- Millet
  - Awaokoshi - Japan
- Rice
  - Ampaw - Philippines
  - Bhelpuri - South Asia
  - Muri - South Asia
  - Puffed rice
- Other
  - Yeot-gangjeong - East Asia
  - Maná - puffed pasta, corn, or wheat kernels from Peru
  - Moong dal - puffed mung beans from South Asia

=== Puffed dough foods ===
- Corn puff
  - Bamba - Israel
  - Buffies - Palestine
  - Pofak - GCC countries
  - Cheese puffs - North America
  - Corn Pops
  - Kix (cereal)
  - Rainbow Drops UK - puffed maize and rice sweets
- Puffed rice cereal
  - Rice krispies
  - Toffee Crisp - sweet made by Nestlé
- Puffed wheat cereal
  - Golden Crisp, Honey Smacks USA - breakfast cereal
  - Honey Monster Puffs UK - breakfast cereal

== See also ==
- Flattened rice
- Rolled oats
- Bamba (snack)
