= Lagkitan corn =

Variety of corn

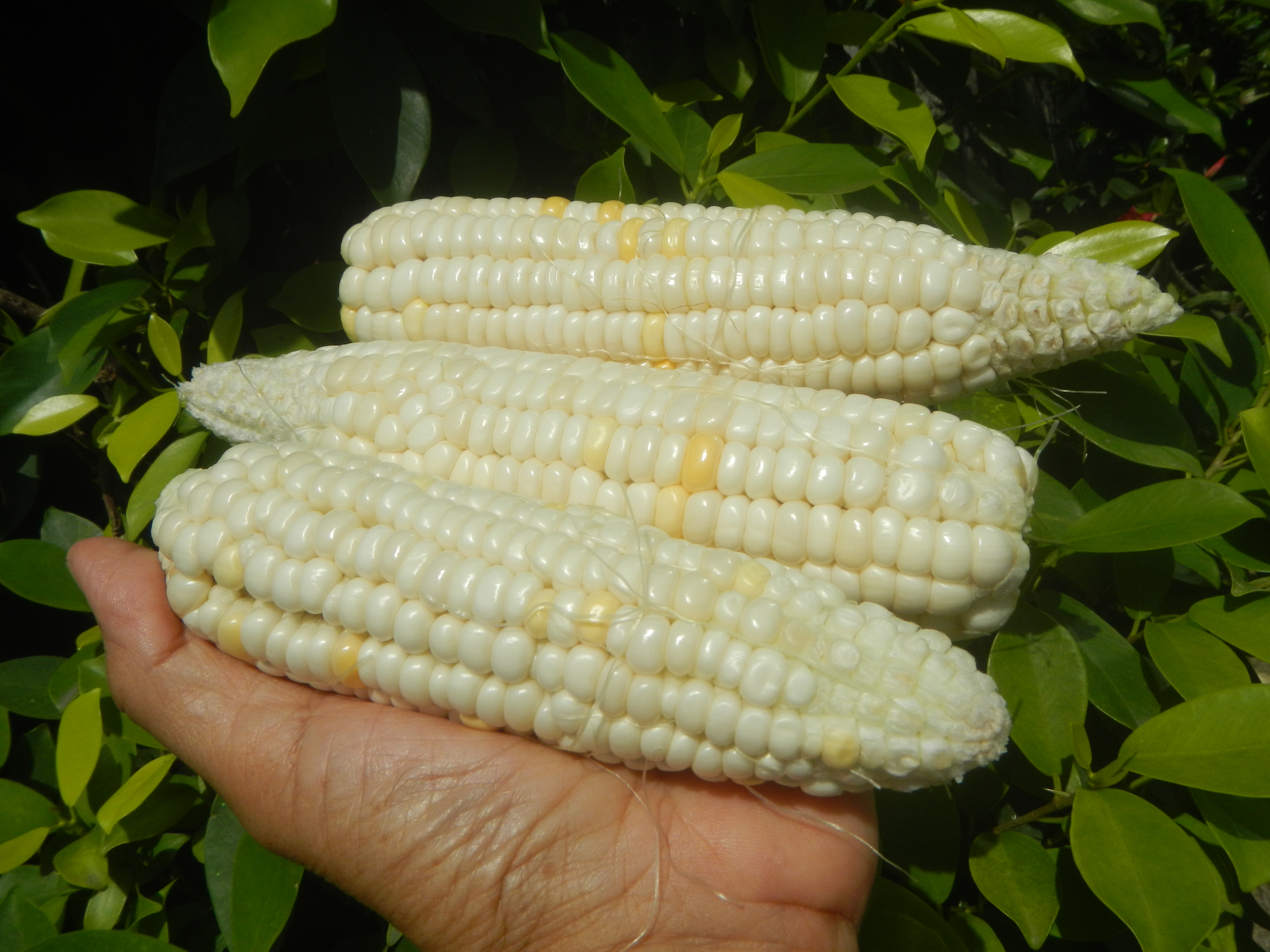
- Lagkitan corn
- Species: Zea mays L. var. ceratina
- Origin: Philippines

Lagkitan corn, also known as white lagkitan corn, is an heirloom cultivar of waxy corn from the Philippines. It is one of the two most commonly cultivated corn varieties in the country (the other being the Visayan white corn). It is made into various traditional dishes like binatog and cornick.

== Names ==
Lagkitan means "sticky" in Tagalog. It is known under a variety of regional names which also mean "sticky", including Visayan pilit, Tagalog malagkit, Ilocano dikket, and Bikol pulutan, among others. Many of these names may also reflect genetically distinct regional strains. These names are also shared by various heirloom cultivars of glutinous rice.

== Description ==
Corn is native to the Americas, but it was introduced early into the Philippines during the Spanish colonial period (1565–1898). The earliest records of corn crops in the Philippines is from Cebu in the 1700s, though it was probably introduced earlier, along with tobacco and cacao. Through natural selection and human-directed plant breeding over centuries, the introduced corn has developed into multiple local varieties with considerable genetic variability.

Lagkitan is one of these cultivars characterized by being sticky when cooked. It has medium to big soft and typically white kernels. It is an openly pollinated variety (OPV) of corn. From planting, it can be harvested after 72 days, with an average marketable ear yield of 40 tons/hectare.

== Uses ==
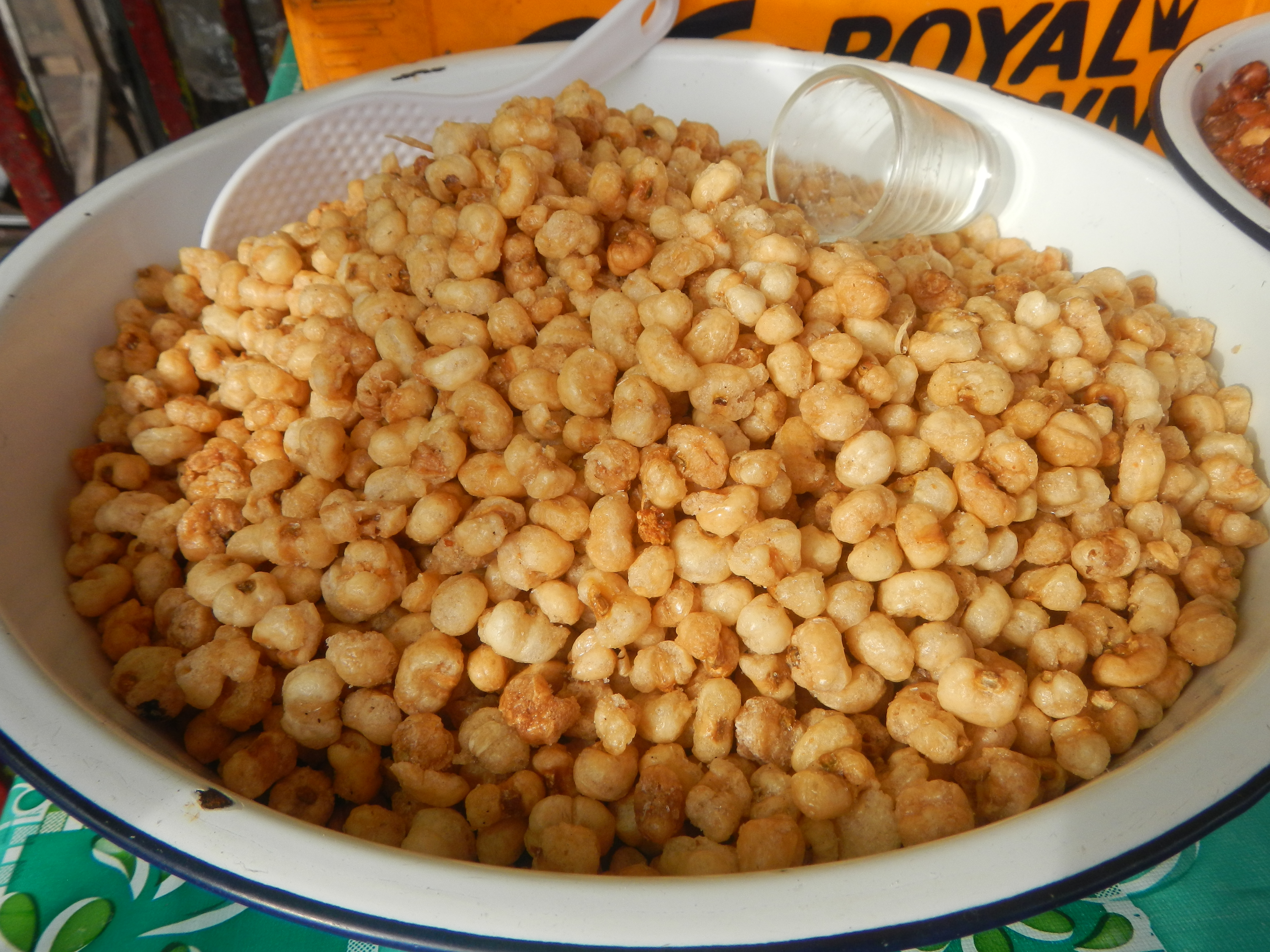
Cornick, deep-fried kernels of soaked lagkitan corn

Lagkitan corn are harvested when the husk is still green. It is the traditional and preferred corn cultivar to be boiled on the cob and eaten as is, though in modern times, it is increasingly being replaced by imported sweet corn.

It can also be made into various traditional dishes including binatog and cornick. When dried, it can also be ground into cornmeal, grits, or cornflour.

== See also ==
- Visayan white corn
