= Cornick =

Cornick is a surname. Notable people with the surname include:

- Andrew Cornick (born 1981), Welsh field hockey player
- Glenn Cornick (1947–2014), British bass player
- Paul Cornick (born 1989), American football player

== Other ==
- Cornick (food), also spelled kornik or cornic, a Filipino corn nut snack
- Lemuel Cornick Shepherd Jr. (1896–1990), American general
