= Corn nut =

Snack made from corn kernels

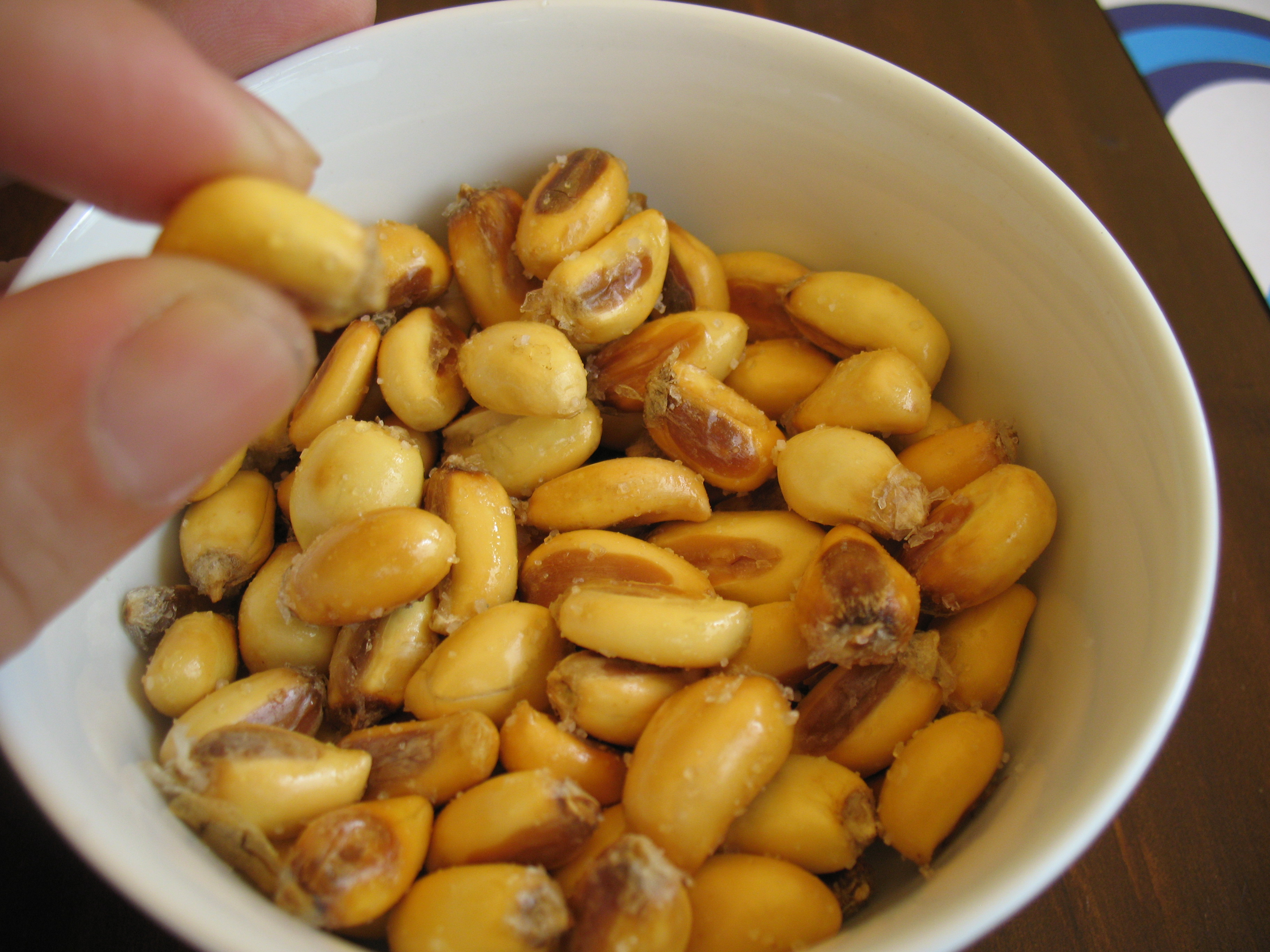
- Cancha in Peru
- Course: Snack
- Place of origin: Peru
- Region or state: South America
- Associated cuisine: Peruvian, Ecuadorian
- Ingredients generally used: Roasted or deep-fried corn kernels

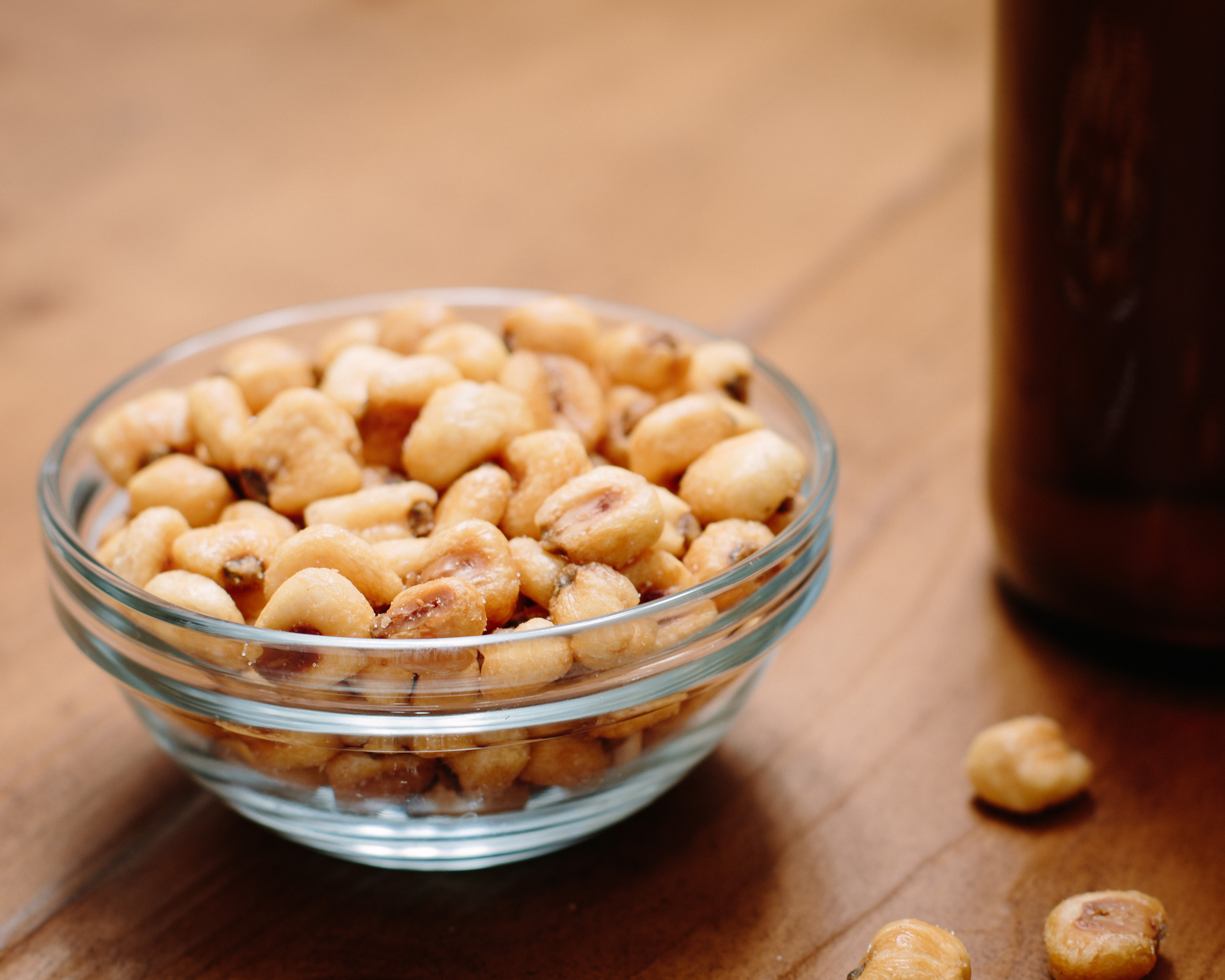
Corn nuts in a bowl

Corn nuts, also known as toasted corn, are a snack food made of roasted or deep-fried corn kernels. It is referred to as cancha in Peru, chulpi in Ecuador, kikones in Spain, and cornick in the Philippines.

== Preparation ==
Corn nuts are prepared by soaking whole corn kernels in water for three days, then deep-frying them in oil until they are hard and brittle. The kernels are soaked because they shrink during the harvesting and cleaning process, and rehydration returns them to their original size. They can be made at home using an air fryer or by frying or baking.

== History ==
Corn nuts were first made by Native Americans in a form called parched corn. The native Americans used them as a lightweight easy to carry nutritious food. Corn nuts also had an early start in Peru and are called cancha, where they have been prepared for over 1,000 years. They are found in Ecuador and Brazil as well.

== Varieties and brands ==
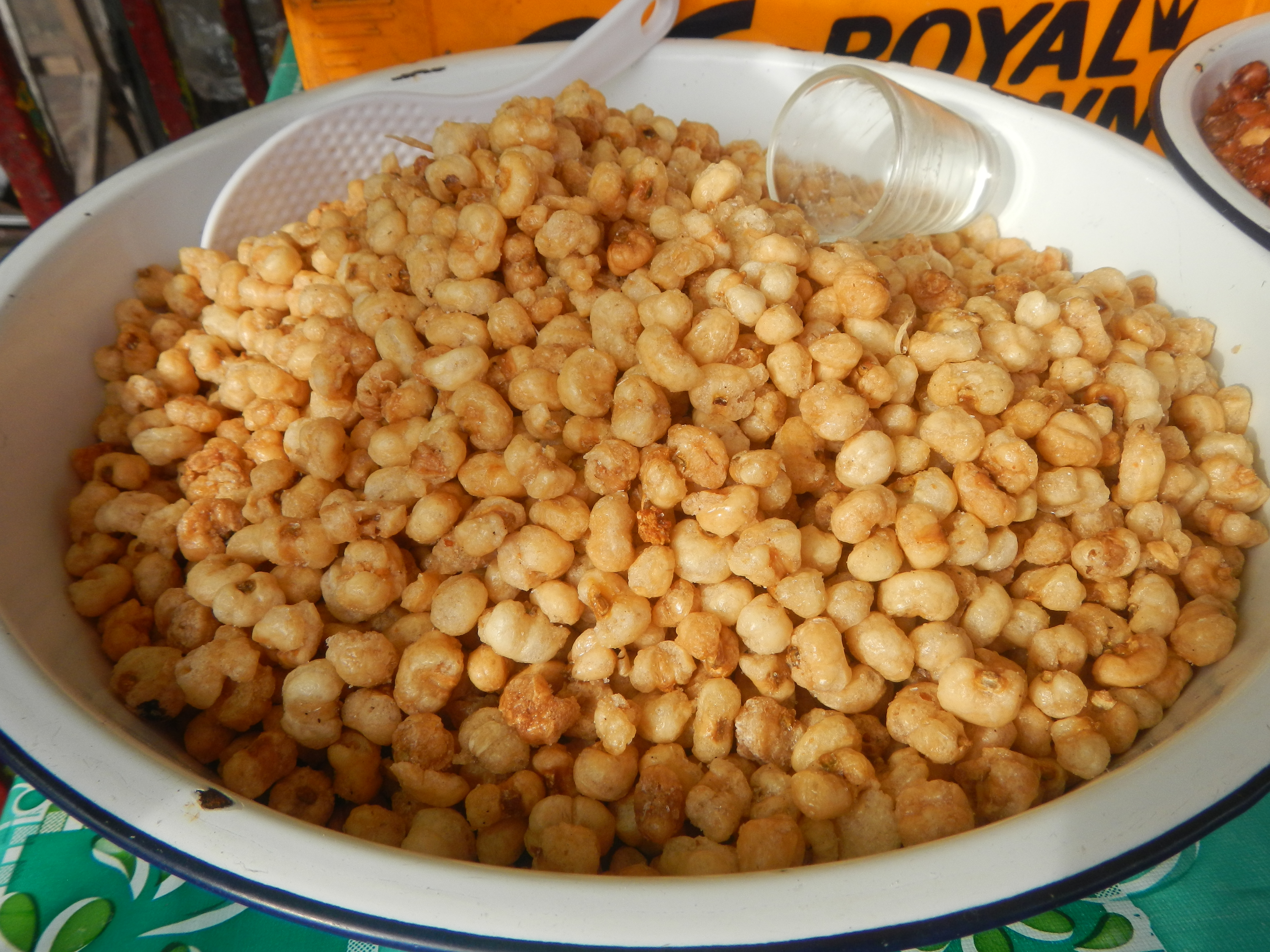
Cornick from the Philippines

=== CornNuts ===
In 1936, entrepreneur Olin Huntington first introduced the corn nut to the United States, producing them to be handed out at bars for free, but a recently introduced law in California banned the distribution of free food at watering holes. Subsequently, another man named Allan Holloway obtained the company and began selling the product at stores. He then trademarked the name Corn Nuts (sometimes written as "CornNuts") in the 1940s.

Holloway later renamed his product CornNuts. After Holloway and his sons Maurice and Rich learned of a breed of corn grown in Cusco, Peru (often referred to as Cuzco corn) that grew large kernels (some said to have been bigger than a quarter), the company researched developing a hybrid of the Cusco corn that could be grown effectively in California. After a decade of research, the company introduced CornNuts made with the hybrid variety in 1964. CornNuts sold on the market today are no longer of the large Cusco corn size.

The most popular brand, CornNuts, was owned by Holloway's original family company until the company was purchased by Nabisco in 1998. Cornnuts was a registered trademark of Kraft Foods. On February 11, 2021, Kraft sold the Planters and Corn Nuts brands to Hormel Foods. Corn Nuts are available in nine flavors: Original, Ranch, BBQ (barbecue-flavored), Chile Picante con Limon, Mexican Style Street Corn, Jalapeño Cheddar, Kickin' Dill Pickle, Partially Popped Kickin' Cheddar, Partially Popped White Cheddar, and Loaded Taco. Many other companies offer an almost identical product but legally must call them Corn Nuts or Toasted Corn.

=== Cornick ===
A Filipino variant of corn nuts is cornick (Filipino: kornik). Compared to the American variety, cornick pieces are typically smaller and crispier. They are also traditionally made from glutinous corn. Garlic is the most common flavor of cornick, with other common flavors including: chili cheese, adobo, barbecue, lechón manok (also known as roasted chicken), and sweet. Major brands include Boy Bawang (literally "Garlic Boy" in Tagalog, commonly sold in small packets), Corn Bits, and Safari.

A popular variety of cornick is the lighter, chicharrón-like chichacorn, a semi-popped style of cornick using glutinous corn from the Ilocos Region which is treated with lime before frying.

=== Diana ===
Diana, a snack company in El Salvador, makes a variety of corn-nut-like snacks. These are called elotitos in Spanish, or cornbits. These come in a variety of seasonings, such as Lemon, Cheese and Chili, and Barbecue. These are sold throughout Central America.

== Portugal and Spain ==
In both Portugal and Spain, corn nuts are often eaten as a popular snack. In Spain, they are known as kikones, or maíz tostado ("toasted corn"), maíz frito ("fried corn"), quicos ("Frankies") and pepes ("Joes"), and in Portugal, they are sold under the name milho frito (fried corn).

The base flavor tends to be very salty. Some brands have barbecue versions available.

Recently, crushed corn nuts have been introduced in Spain as a cover for battering.

== See also ==
- Corn snack
- List of edible seeds
- List of maize dishes
- Puffed grain
- Soy nut
