= Suam na mais =

Filipino corn soup with pork or shrimp

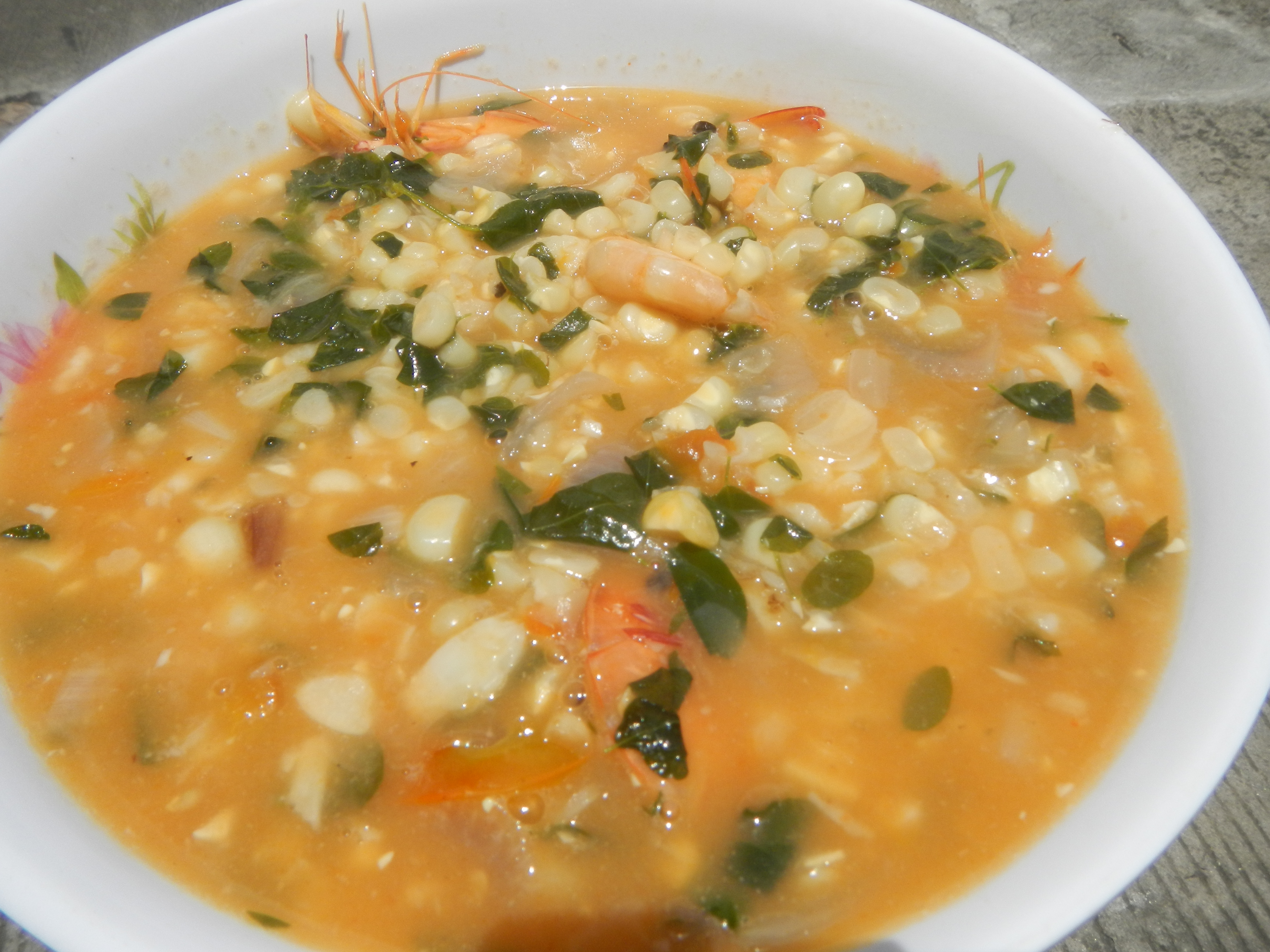
- Alternative names: suam mais, sinuwam na mais, suwam na mais, ginisang mais, sinabawang mais
- Course: Soup
- Place of origin: Philippines
- Region or state: Pampanga
- Serving temperature: Hot
- Main ingredients: corn, beef/shrimp, leafy vegetables, onion, garlic, salt, pepper

Suam na mais is a Filipino corn soup with leafy vegetables (like moringa, bitter melon, or Malabar spinach leaves), and pork and/or shrimp. It originates from the province of Pampanga. It is also known as ginisang mais in Tagalog and sinabawang mais in the Visayan languages. It is served hot, usually during the rainy season.

== See also ==
- Ginataang mais
- Binatog
- List of maize dishes
- Maíz con hielo
