= Binaki =

Filipino corn tamale

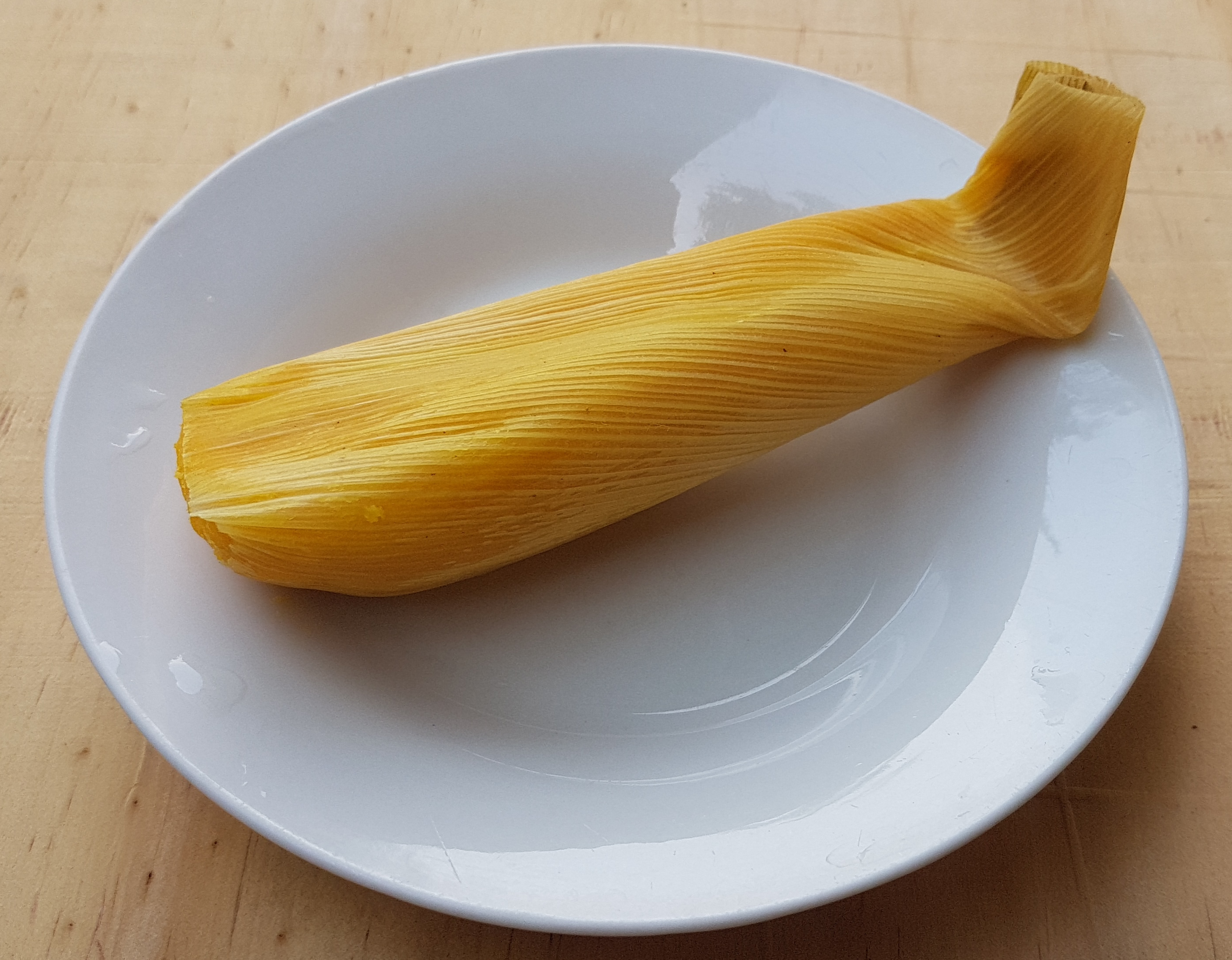
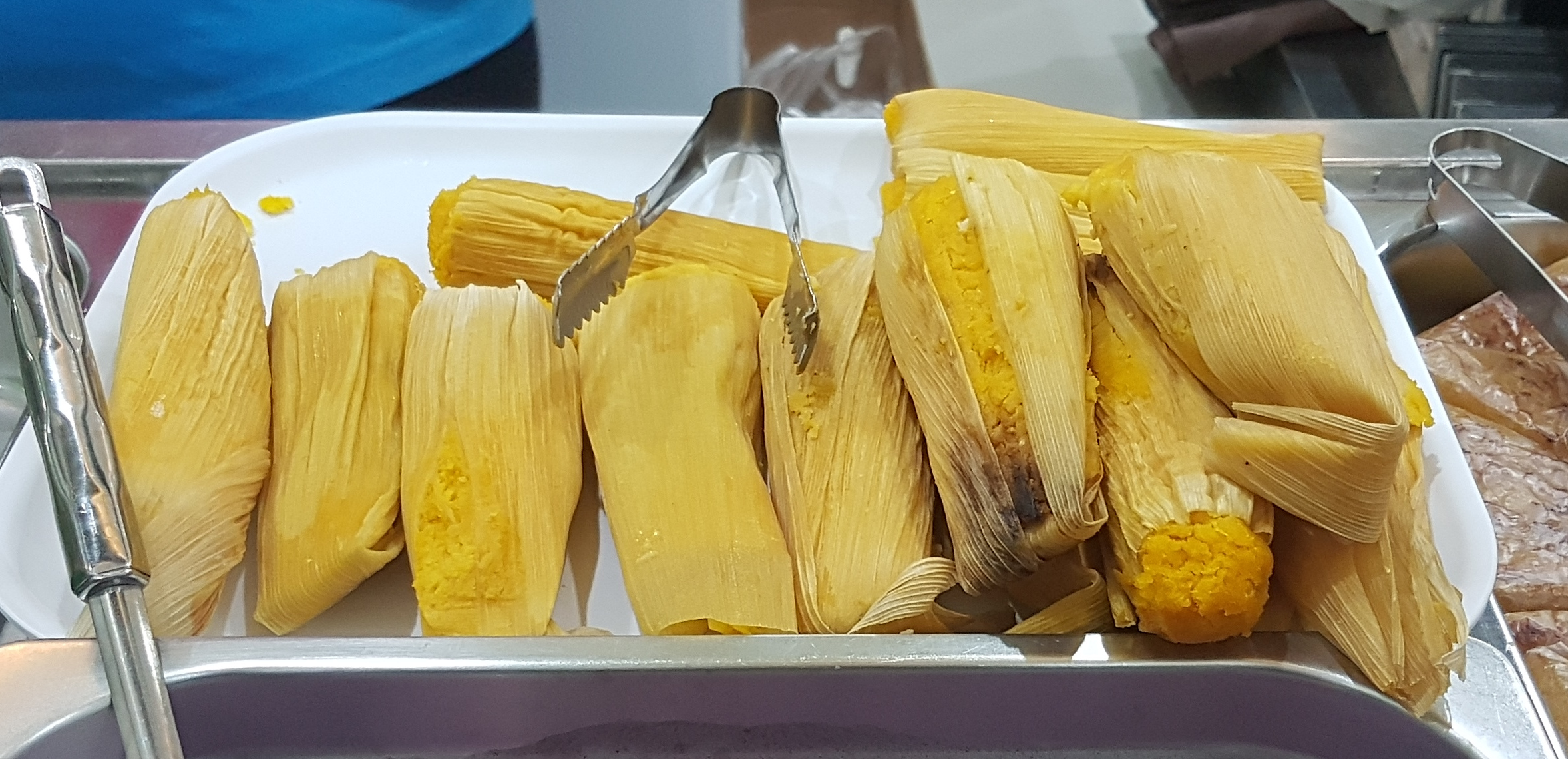
- Bukidnon binaki
- Alternative names: Pintos
- Course: Dessert, snack
- Place of origin: Philippines
- Region or state: Bukidnon, Northern Mindanao; Bogo, Northern Cebu
- Serving temperature: Warm, room temperature
- Main ingredients: Cornmeal, coconut milk (or milk), margarine (or butter), sugar, baking powder,
- Variations: Biyaki

Binaki (Cebuano pronunciation: [bɪnɑkiʔ]) or pintos is a type of steamed corn sweet tamales from two regions in the Philippines – Bukidnon and Bogo, Cebu. They are distinctively wrapped in corn husks and are commonly sold as pasalubong and street food in Northern Mindanao and Cebu. It is sometimes anglicized as "steamed corn cakes".

== Description ==
Binaki and pintos are sweet variants of Philippine tamales without fillings. They arose independently in Bukidnon and Bogo. Both are traditionally wrapped in corn husks, but can usually be distinguished from each other by the method of wrapping. Binaki has a longer and narrower wrapping, while pintos is shorter and rectangular with additional cross-wise ties. Both the names binaki and pintos literally mean "wrapped [in a pouch]"; from Cebuano bakibaki ("[pouch made of leaves] shaped like a frog"), and a contracted form of pinutos ("wrapped"), respectively.

Binaki and pintos are prepared identically. They are made by scraping young corn ears on a grater. The resulting coarse cornmeal is then mixed with coconut milk (or milk), margarine (butter), baking powder, and white or brown sugar. In lieu of coconut milk and sugar, condensed milk may sometimes be used. Cheese may also be added, though it is rare. The mixture is then scooped and wrapped in corn husk before being steamed until firm.

== Variants ==
A variant among the Maranao people derived from the Bukidnon binaki is biyaki. However, it has diverged greatly and is generally considered a separate dish. It uses grated cassava primarily, with only bits of grated young corn kernels mixed in. It is sold wrapped in banana leaves like suman, although it can also be wrapped in corn husk.

== See also ==
- Binatog
- Cornbread
- List of maize dishes
- Maíz con hielo
- Tamal
