= Cornmeal =

Meal (coarse flour) ground from dried maize

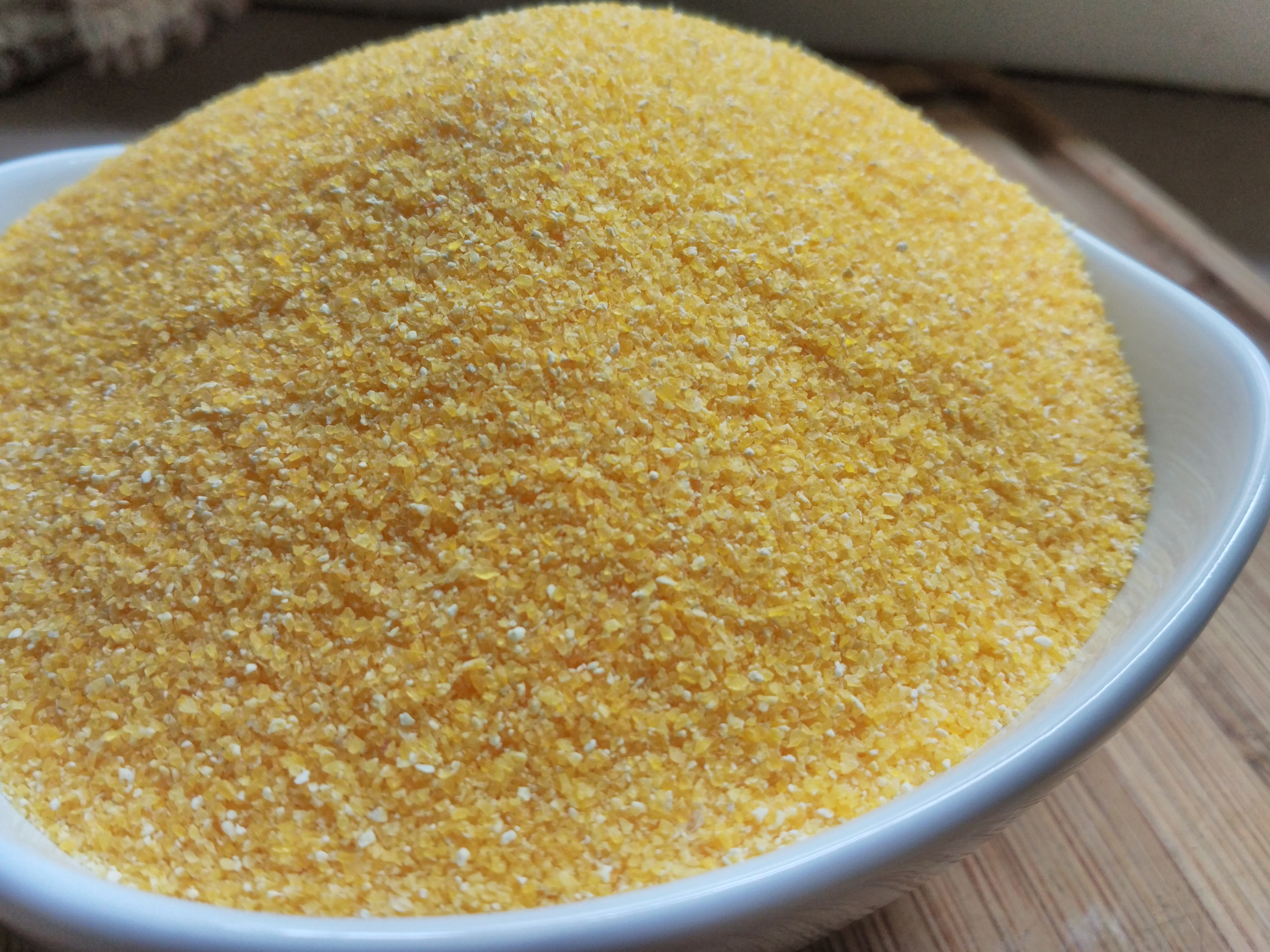
- Main ingredients: Maize

Cornmeal is a meal (coarse flour) ground from dried maize. It is a common staple food and is ground to coarse, medium, and fine consistencies, but it is not as fine as wheat flour can be. In Mexico and Louisiana, very finely ground cornmeal is referred to as corn flour. When fine cornmeal is made from maize that has been soaked in an alkaline solution, e.g., limewater (a process known as nixtamalization), it is called masa harina (or masa flour), which is used for making arepas, tamales, and tortillas. Boiled cornmeal is called polenta in Italy and is also a traditional dish and bread substitute in Romania.

== Types ==
There are various types of cornmeal:

- Blue cornmeal is light blue or violet in color. It is ground from whole blue corn and has a sweet flavor. The cornmeal consists of dried corn kernels that have been ground into a fine or medium texture.
- Steel-ground yellow cornmeal, which is common mostly in the United States, has the husk and germ of the maize kernel almost completely removed. It will remain fresh for about a year if stored in an airtight container in a cool, dry place.
- Stone-ground cornmeal retains some of the hull and germ, lending a little more flavor and nutrition to recipes. It is more perishable, but will store longer if refrigerated. However, it too can have a shelf life of many months if kept in a reasonably cool place.
- White cornmeal (mielie-meal), made from white corn, is more common in parts of Africa. It is also popular in the Southern United States for making cornbread.

== Regional usage ==
=== Africa ===
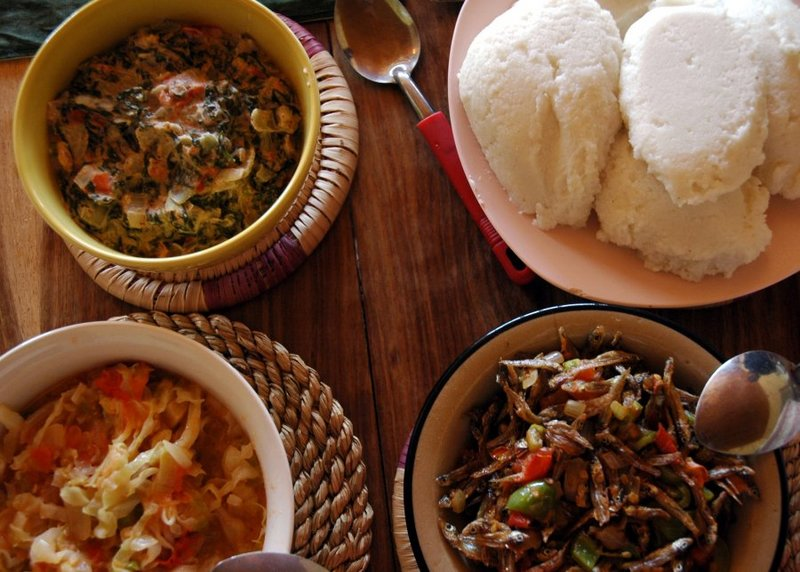
Southern Africa's nshima cornmeal (top right corner), served with three relishes.

- Tuwo masara - Northern Nigeria
- Mielie-meal or maize meal - Southern Africa
- Nomadi - Democratic Republic of the Congo
- Nshima or bwali - Zambia
- Nsima - Malawi
- Oshifima or oshimbob - Namibia
- Sadza / isitshwala/ - Zimbabwe
- Ugali - Great Lakes (sima and posho in Uganda)
- Recipes that may use cornmeal as an additional ingredient are fufu (foufou) in Central and West Africa.
- Soor - Somalia
- Cornmeal is also often used as an additional ingredient in the preparation of injera or lahoh, flatbread that is traditionally eaten in the countries of the Horn of Africa (Djibouti, Eritrea, Ethiopia and Somalia) and nearby Yemen.
- Poudine maïs - Mauritius
- Sosso maïs- Reunion Island

=== Caribbean ===
- Cornmeal porridge - a popular meal served for breakfast in Jamaica.
- Cou-cou - part of the national dish of Barbados, "cou-cou and flying fish".
- Funche - a typical breakfast in Puerto Rico cornmeal cooked with coconut milk, milk, raisins, butter, cloves, vanilla, ginger, sugar or honey and topped with fruit and cinnamon. There is also a savory funche made with cornmeal, coconut milk, chicken stock, sofrito and other ingredients. These are usually served with fish.
- Funchi also known as fungi/fungee - a cornmeal mush cooked and cooled into a stiff pudding, sometimes eaten with saltfish or pepperpot. It is consumed on the islands of Curaçao, Saint Martin and is part of the national dish of Antigua and Barbuda.
- Mayi moulen - a cornmeal dish in Haiti often cooked with fish or spinach. Can be eaten with avocado.

=== East Asia ===
- Rolled corn porridge known as 糝糝飯 (Jin Chinese: [ʂaʔ ʂaʔ fã] or [səŋ səŋ fã]) is far more common than millet porridge in Shanxi and Shaanxi due to their disparity of local production. Even if foxtail millet porridge is made, it is usually topped with rolled corn. In Ji-lu Mandarin, rolled corn porridge is known as 棒子面粥 bangzimianzhou.
- Wo tou (窩頭) - Shaped like a hollow cone, this cornbread looks like a bird's nest, after which it is named. It is commonly eaten in northern China, and may contain dried jujubes and other flavoring agents.

=== Europe ===
- Arapash or harapash - Albania (similar to the Romanian style but often combined with lamb organs, or/and goat cheese)
- Farina di granturco - Italy (not the same as farina, which is made from wheat)
- G'omi (Georgian: ღომი, romanized: ghomi), mchadi (Georgian: მჭადი, romanized: mch'adi), tchvishtari - Georgia (g'omi is similar to polenta, mchadi - cornbread, tshvishtari - cheese cornbread). Known by different names in local languages (Abkhaz: абысҭа abysta, Adyghe: мамрыс mamrys, Ingush: журан-худар juran-hudar, Nogai: мамырза mamyrza, Iron Ossetic: дзыкка dzykka or сера sera), it is also widespread in other Caucasian cuisines.
- Indian Meal or Yellowmeal - Ireland
- Kachamak (качамак) - Bulgaria, North Macedonia and Serbia
- Mălai - Romania (the cornmeal itself; prepared as mămăligă)
- Polenta - southern Europe, especially North Italy
- Banush - Ukraine (the dish prepared from cornmeal with added śmietana, topped with pork rind or mushrooms and bryndza etc. The dish is popular in the Carpathian region of western Ukraine)
- Kuymak - Turkey, especially in the northern parts around the Black Sea.

=== North America ===
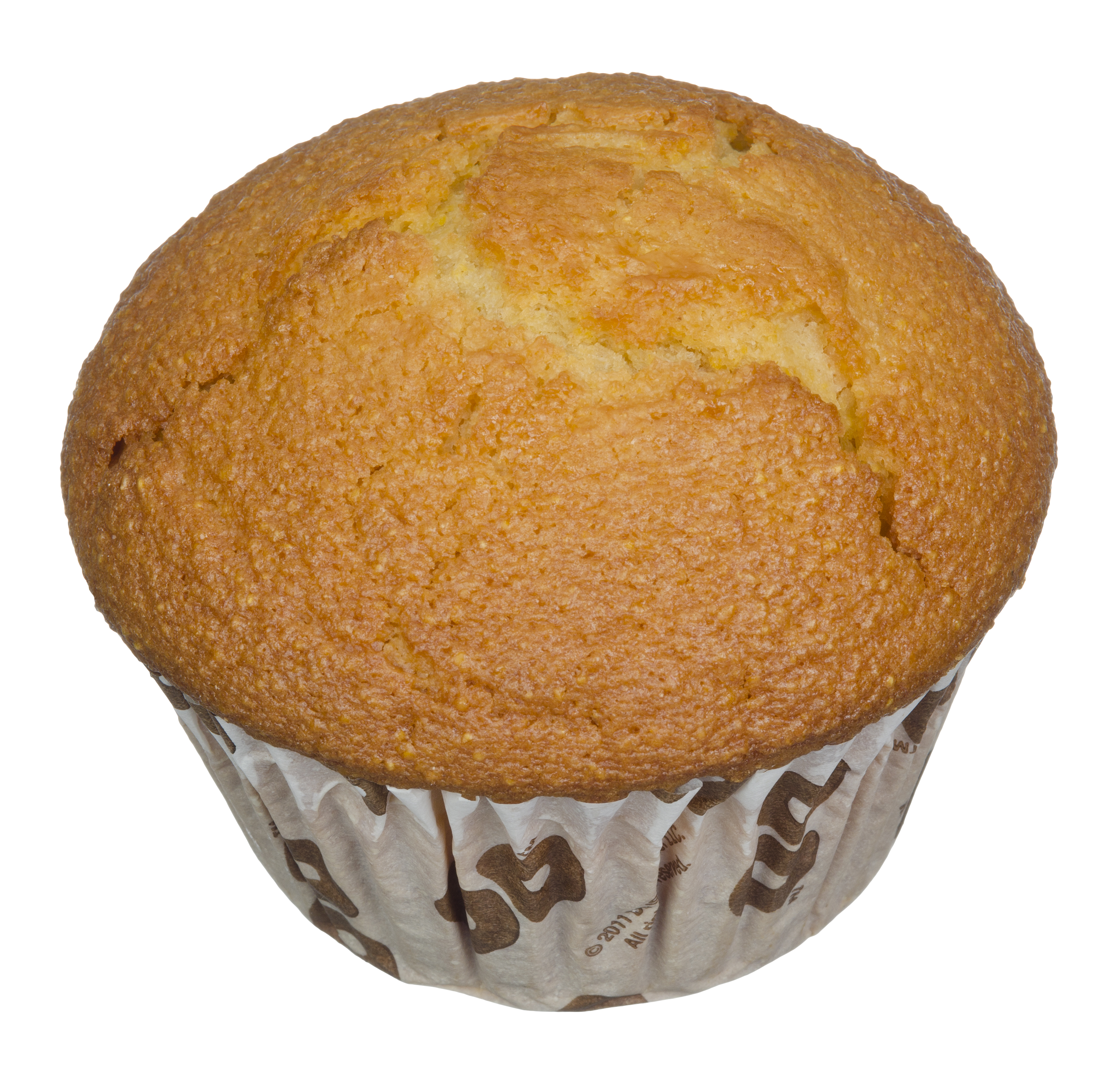
A corn muffin from Dunkin' Donuts

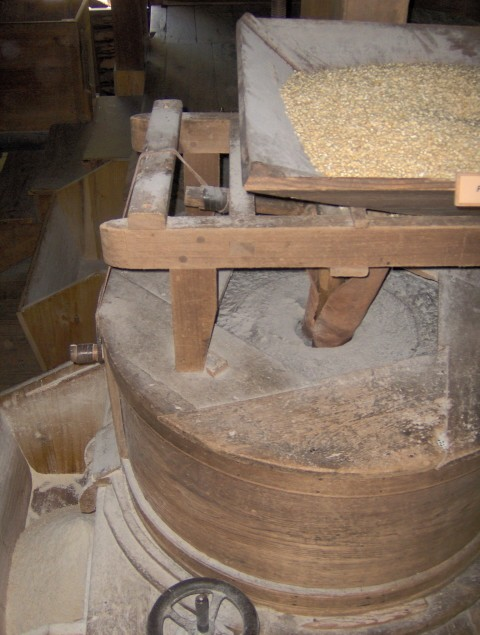
Grindstones inside Mingus Mill, in the Great Smoky Mountains of North Carolina. Corn is placed in a hopper (top right) which slowly feeds it into the grindstone (center). The grindstone grinds the corn into cornmeal, and empties it into a bucket (lower left). The grindstones are turned by the mill's water-powered turbine.

- Masa or masa harina - Nixtamalized corn used for making tamales and tortillas in Central America, Mexico, and South America.
- As a batter for a fried food, such as corn dogs
- Made into bread, as in corn fritters, cornbread, hushpuppies, jonnycakes, or spoonbread
- As breading for fried or baked foods, such as fried fish, fried oysters, or fried frog legs
- As a breakfast cereal ingredient
- Cheese curl-type snack foods, such as Cheetos and Cheezies
- In corn chips such as Fritos, but not tortilla chips or corn tortillas, which are made from nixtamalized maize flour
- Peameal bacon, back bacon rolled in cornmeal, known colloquially in the U.S. as 'Canadian bacon'
- As a release agent to prevent breads and pizza from sticking to their pans when baking
- As grits
- As a porridge, such as cornmeal mush, which is often then sliced and grilled
- Known as "samp", it was used in colonial times as a kind of porridge.

=== South America ===
- Fubá - Brazil.
- Masarepa - Soaked and cooked corn, ground fine into a flour, used in Colombia and Venezuela to make arepas, almojábanas and empanadas.
- Polenta - a typical dish in many countries, including Argentina, Brazil, Paraguay and Uruguay.
- Karoe papa (cornmeal porridge, mais pap) - a staple meal served in Suriname as breakfast or dessert with vanilla and/or almond essence, cinnamon and nutmeg.

=== South Asia ===
- Makki di roti - a traditional Punjabi bread often eaten with saag in Punjab province of northern India and eastern Pakistan

In parts of northern India and Pakistan ground corn flour is used to make thick slabs of bread which can be eaten with a wide variety of curry dishes or it can be coated in clarified butter or ghee and eaten with yogurt or lassi, a yogurt-based drink.

=== Southeast Asia ===
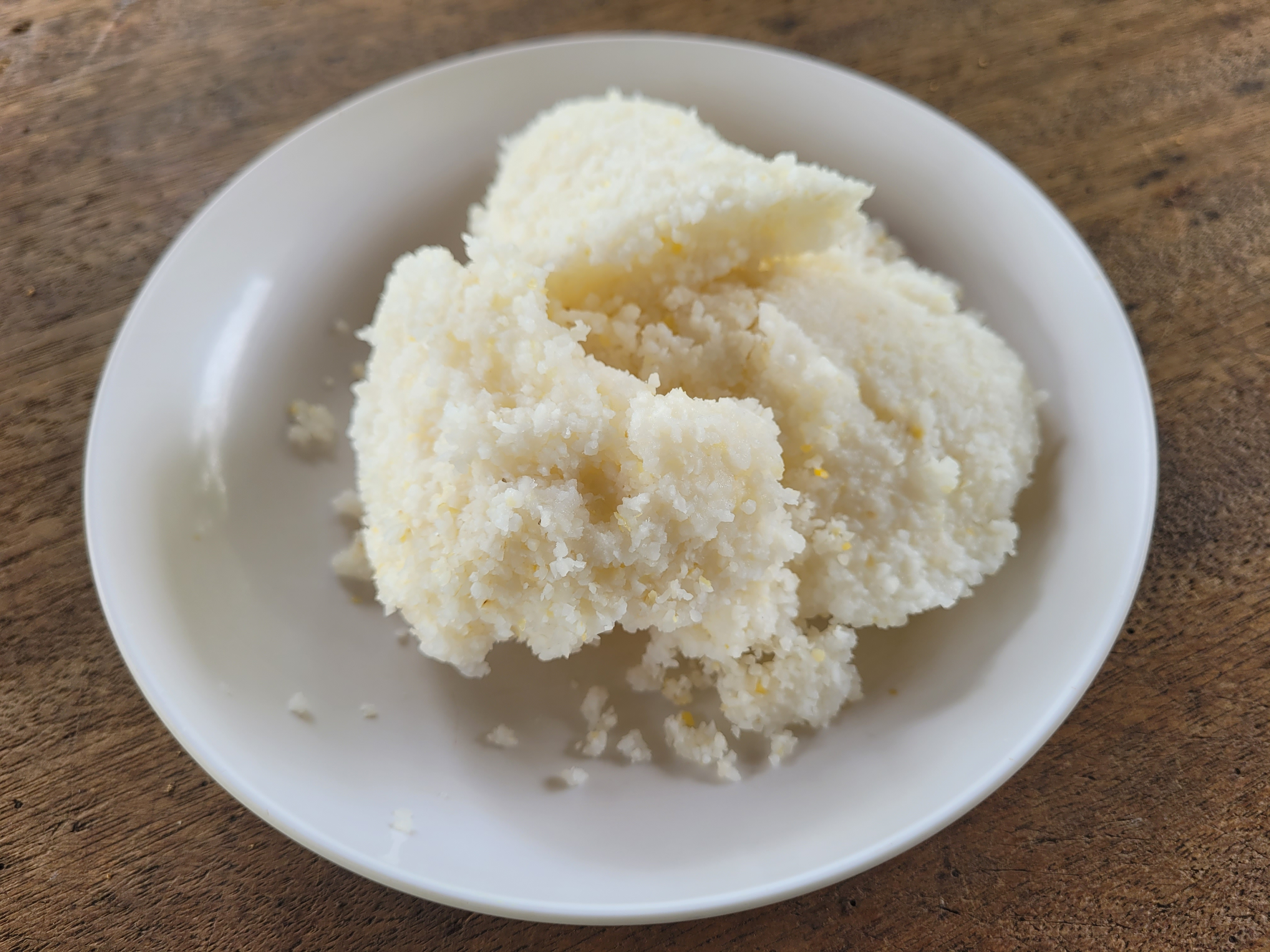
Bugas mais, from coarsely ground Visayan white corn, a common traditional rice alternative and a secondary staple cereal in the Philippines

- Bugas mais - dried and coarsely ground Visayan white corn are eaten as an alternative to steamed white rice, due to its slightly sweet flavor similar to rice. It is known as bugas mais (Cebuano for "milled corn grains"). It is widely considered to be poverty food due to its relative cheapness. Bugas mais is considered a secondary staple food in the Philippines after white rice. It is a staple for around 20% of the Filipino population, particularly in farming regions in Visayas and Mindanao.

== See also ==
- Maize flour
- Semolina
- List of maize dishes
