= Binatog =

Filipino boiled corn dessert

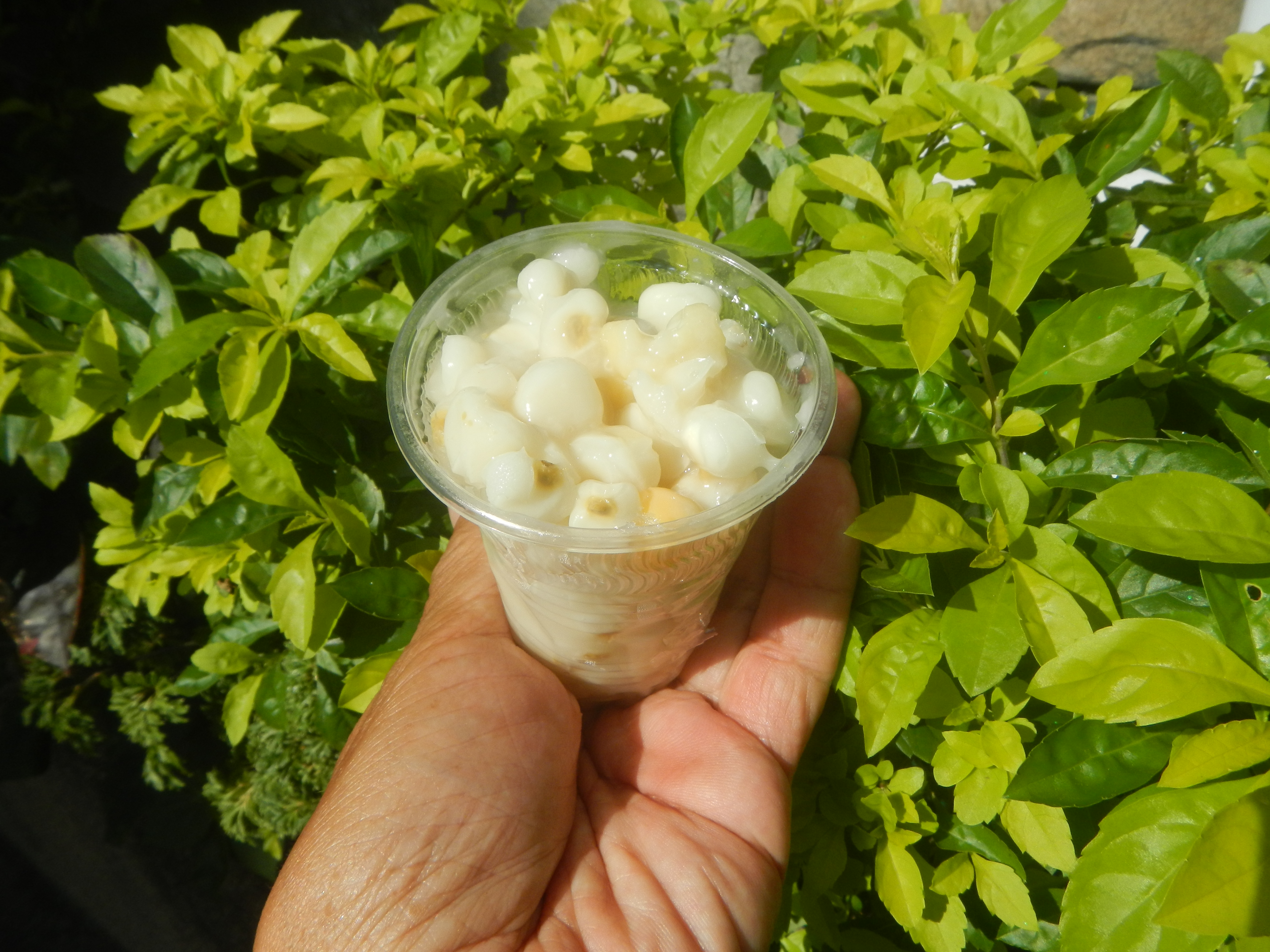
- Binatog
- Alternative names: Bualaw, kinulti, kinulte
- Course: Dessert
- Place of origin: Philippines
- Serving temperature: Hot, warm
- Main ingredients: Lagkitan corn kernels or hominy, grated coconut, butter (or margarine), sugar
- Variations: Binatog sa gata

Binatog, also known as bualaw or kinulti, is a Filipino boiled corn dessert topped with freshly grated coconut, butter, and salt or sugar. It is commonly sold as street food in the northern Philippines by vendors known as magbibinatog carrying characteristic large tin cans, similar to taho vendors.

== Description ==
Binatog is made from dried mature Lagkitan waxy corn kernels soaked in saltwater until the kernels puff up. The kernels are then washed and boiled until very soft. They are then placed into a bowl and topped with grated coconut, butter (or margarine), and sugar to taste.

Modern variants of the dish typically use canned Mexican hominy to skip the soaking process, but boiled young corn kernels may also be used. Some variants also use other toppings like coconut milk (gata) or evaporated milk, in which case it becomes known as binatog sa gata. The iconic dish can be served in a coconut shell with coconut sorbetes. Binatog may also be topped with cheese or sweetened condensed milk.

== See also ==
- Ampaw
- Binaki
- Ginataang mais
- List of maize dishes
- Maíz con hielo
- Pozole
