= Ampaw =

Filipino sweet puffed rice cake

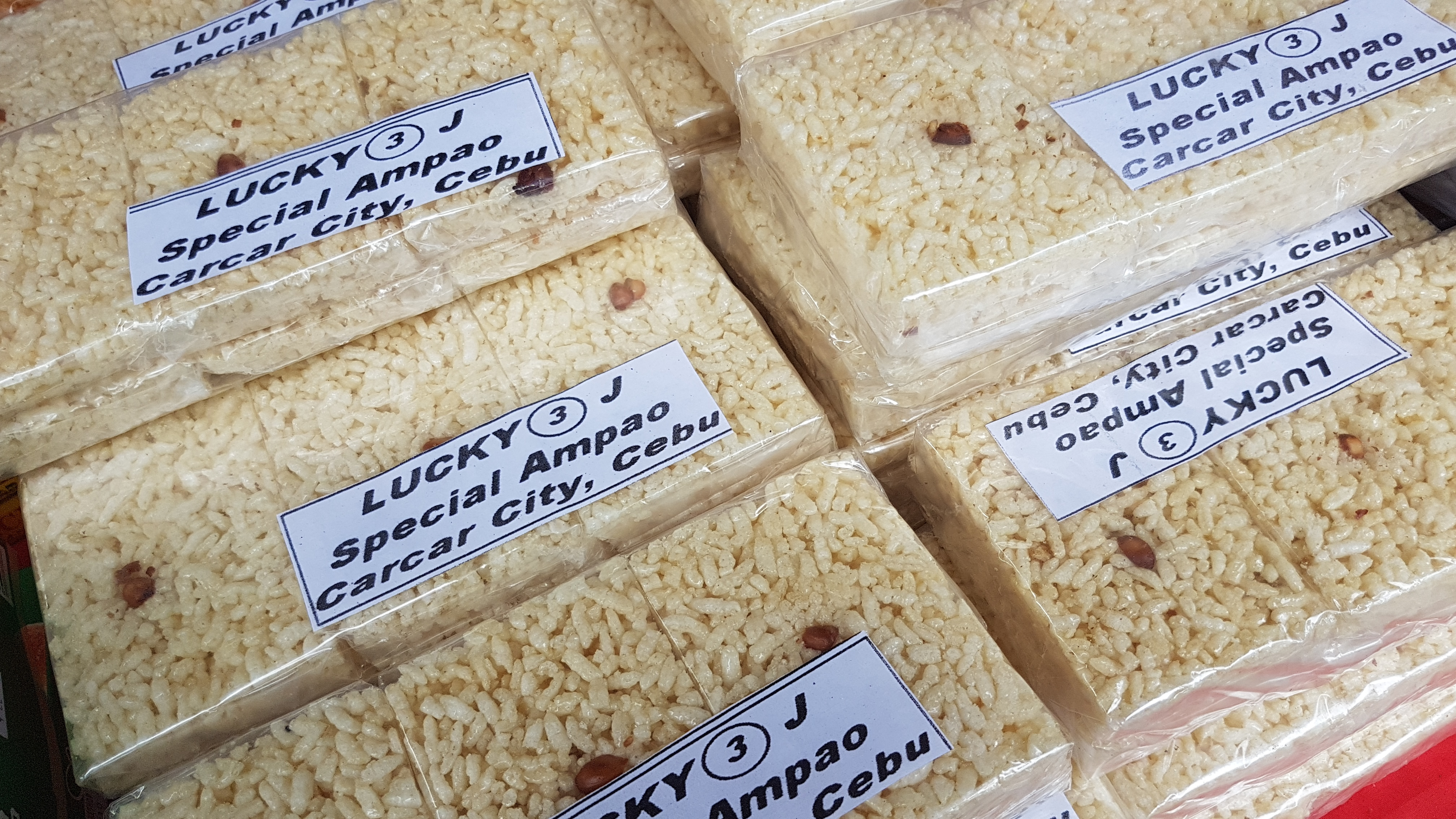
- Ampaw with peanuts, from Cebu
- Alternative names: Ampao, arroz inflado, pop rice, puffed rice, popped rice
- Course: Snack
- Place of origin: Philippines
- Region or state: Visayas
- Serving temperature: Room temperature
- Main ingredients: Rice

Ampaw, ampao or arroz inflado, usually anglicized as pop rice or puffed rice, is a Filipino sweet puffed rice cake. It is traditionally made with sun-dried leftover cooked white rice that is fried and coated with syrup.

== Etymology ==
Ampáw means "puffed grain" in Philippine languages. Though it applies predominantly to the rice version, popcorn can also be referred to as ampáw (more accurately as ampáw na mais, "puffed corn"). In Cebuano slang, ampáw is also a euphemism roughly equivalent to the English idiom "[a person] full of hot air".The term is derived from Proto-Malayo-Polynesian *ampaw (“empty husk (of rice, etc.)”).

Another Filipino word, ampaw (also spelled as angpao or ampao, from Philippine Hokkien Chinese: 紅包; Pe̍h-ōe-jī: âng-pau; lit. 'red packet'), referring to Chinese red envelopes should not be confused with this term, as they are homonyms.

== Description ==
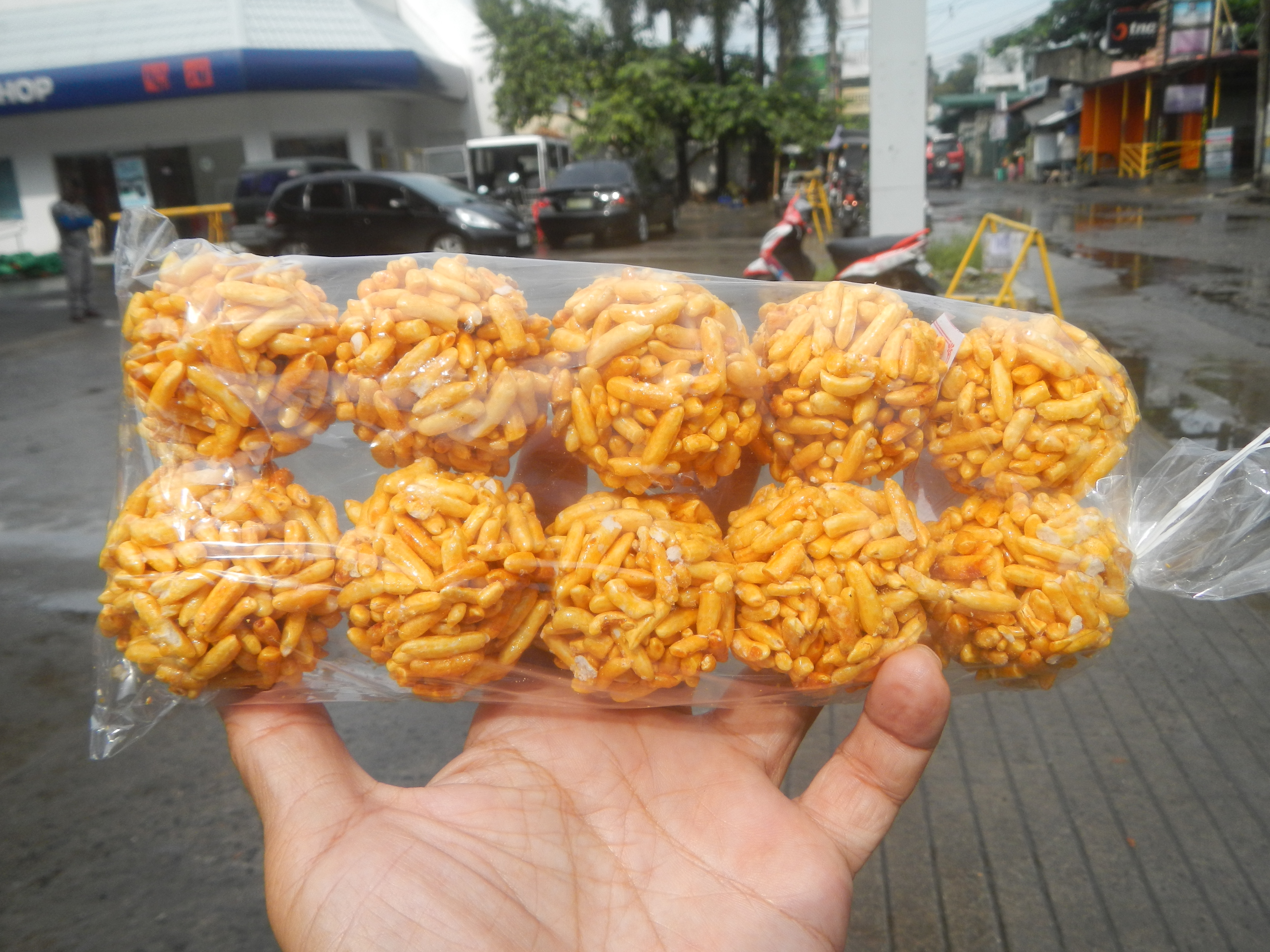
Ampaw dyed yellow and shaped into little balls

Ampaw is made with cooked white rice (usually leftovers). It is dried in the sun for around four hours. They are then fried in hot oil to make them puff up. The oil is drained thoroughly after frying. The sugar glazing is cooked separately using muscovado sugar or molasses (or corn syrup), salt, butter, and vinegar or calamansi juice. The glazing is poured unto the puffed rice and mixed until the grains are evenly coated. It is then allowed to cool and shaped into the desired form before it fully hardens. They are usually cut into square or rectangular blocks or molded into balls.

Traditional ampaw is white in color, but many modern variants are dyed in various colors to appeal more to children.

== Variations ==
Ampaw can be easily modified with added ingredients. Examples include roasted peanuts, pinipig (toasted young rice), and chocolate. Ampaw can also be made with other types of rice, like brown rice or black rice.

== See also ==
- Pinipig
- Binatog
