= Corn pudding =

Thick stewed corn dish from the Southern United States

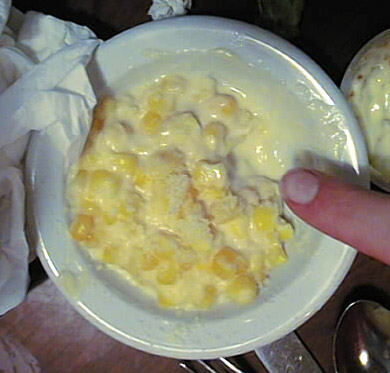
- Alternative names: Pudding corn, puddin' corn, hoppy glop, spoonbread
- Type: Pudding
- Place of origin: United States
- Region or state: Southern United States
- Main ingredients: Maize, water

Corn pudding (also called pudding corn, puddin' corn, hoppy glop, or spoonbread) is a creamy dish prepared from stewed corn, water, any of various thickening agents, and optional additional flavoring or texturing ingredients. It is typically used as a food staple in rural communities in the Southern United States, especially in Appalachia.

Corn pudding has sometimes been prepared using "green corn", which refers to immature ears of corn that have not fully dried. Green corn is not necessarily green in color. The cooking of the corn pulp when preparing the dish can serve to thicken it.

Corn pudding is sometimes served as a Thanksgiving dish.

Corn pudding may be sweet or savory.

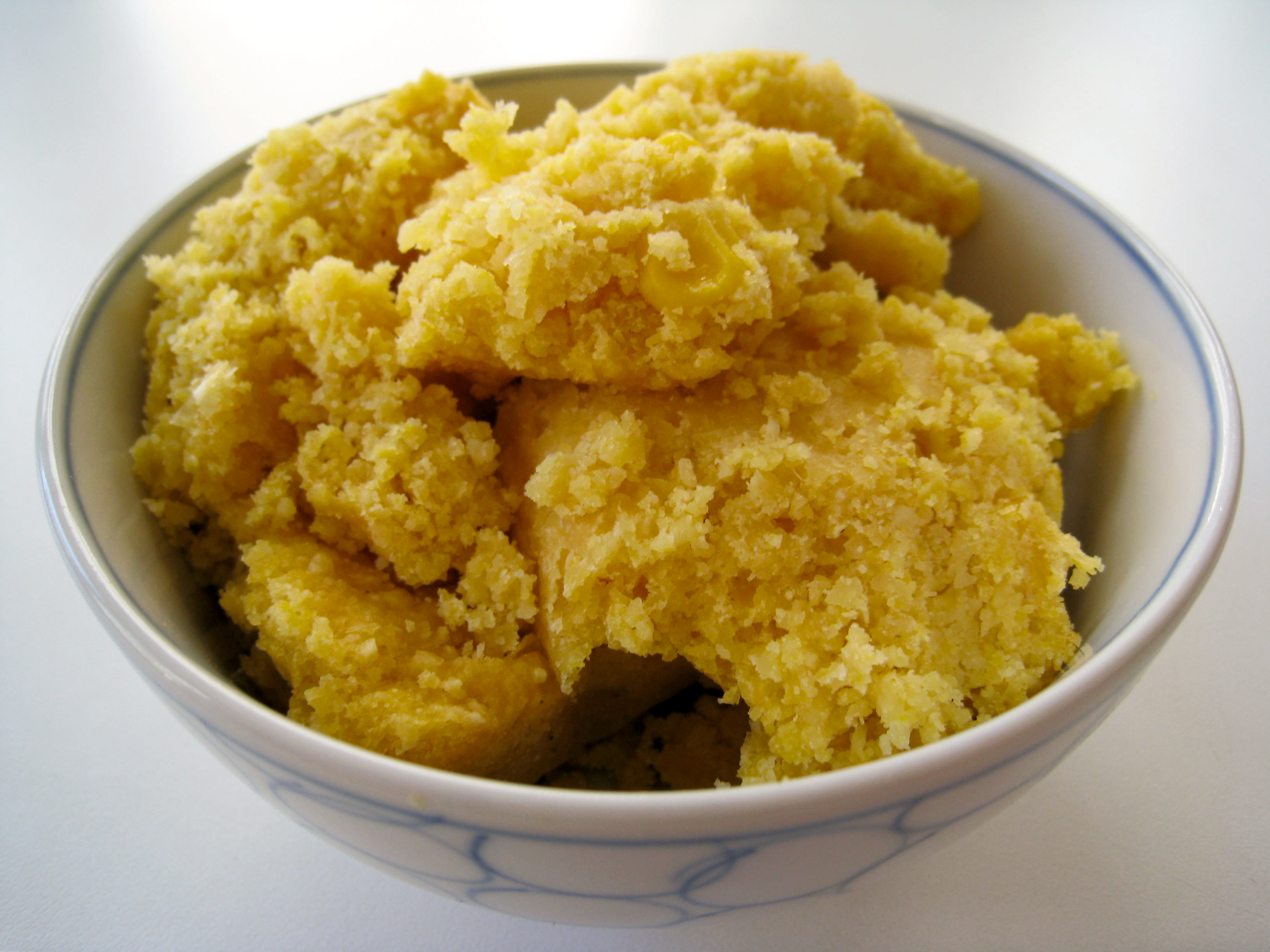
Sweet vegan corn-tomatillo pudding

== Similar dishes ==
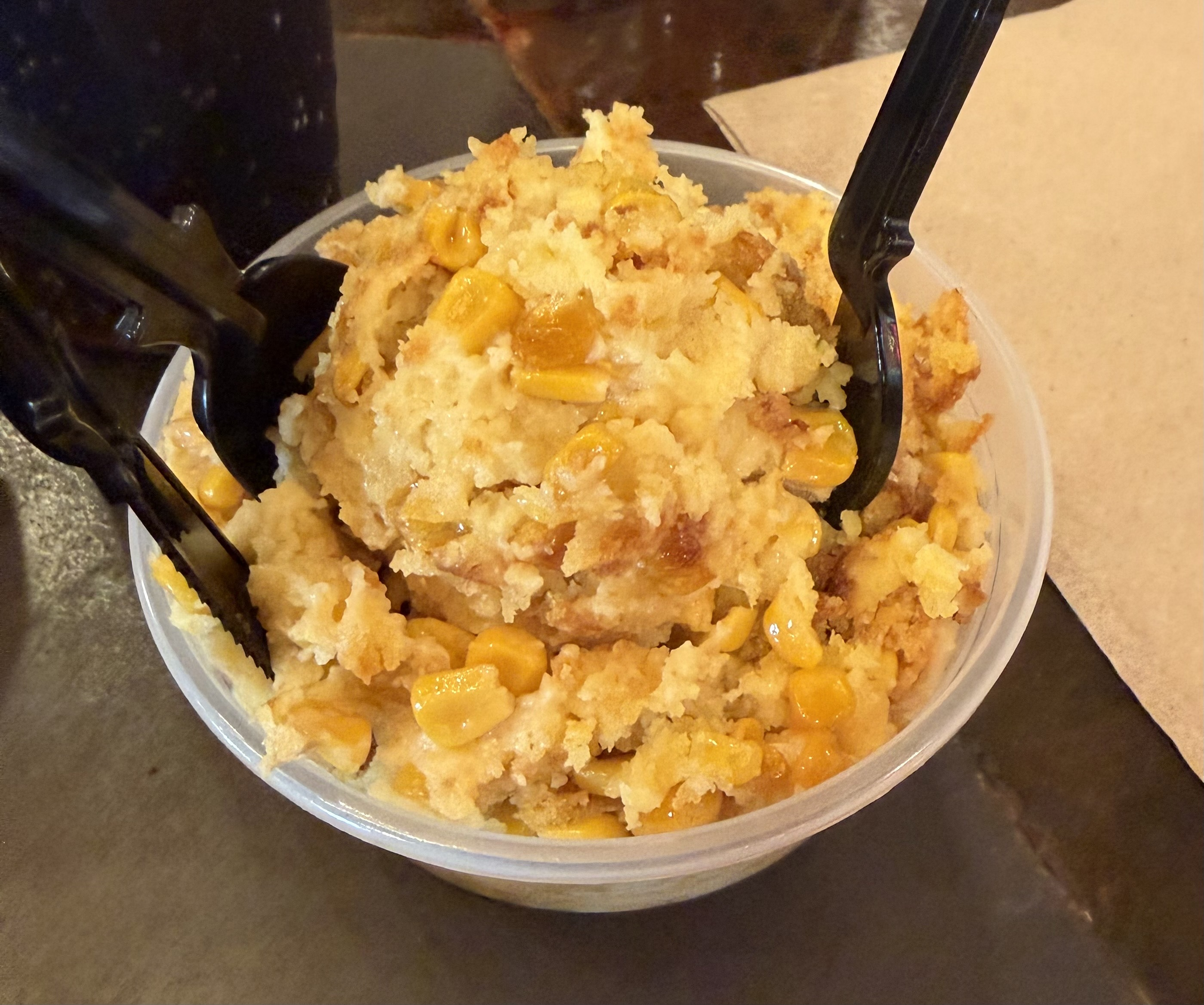
Corn pudding from Truth BBQ in Houston, TX

Corn pudding is not to be confused with hasty pudding, which is typically made from ground corn, rather than whole-kernel corn.

== See also ==
- Bread pudding
- Creamed corn
- Corn chowder
- Cornbread
- Corn stew
- Grits
- Gruel
- List of maize dishes
- Mazamorra
- Mush (cornmeal)
- Pap (food)
- Spoonbread
