= Corn soup =

Soup made with corn

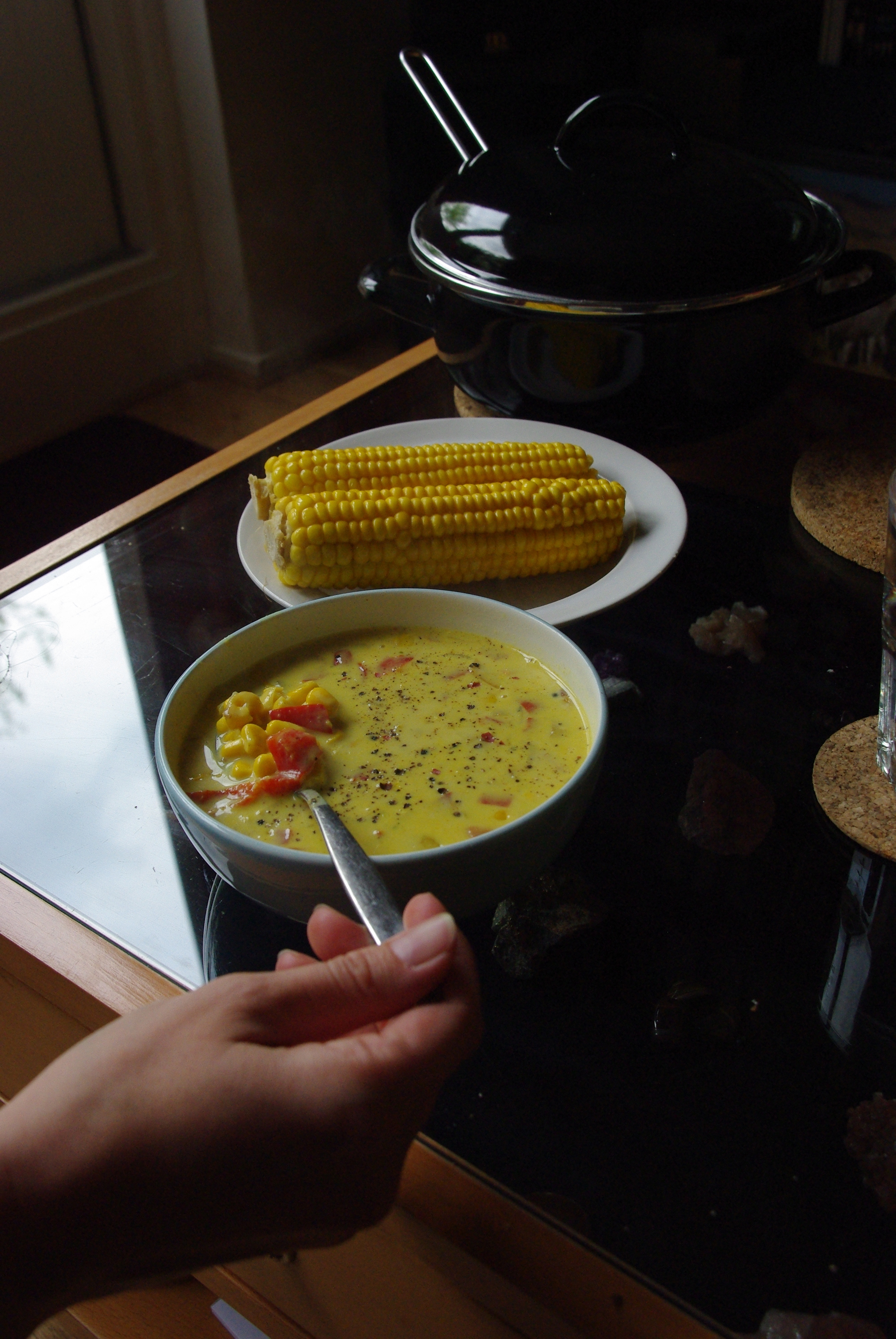
- Corn soup in the Netherlands
- Type: Soup
- Main ingredients: Corn (typically sweet corn), broth or milk/cream

Corn soup is a soup made of corn, typically sweet corn. Initially popular only in corn-producing areas of the world, the dish is now widespread because of greater corn distribution. Typical ingredients are corn cut from the cob, water, butter and flour, with salt and pepper for seasoning. Additional ingredients vary by region, and may include eggs.

== Native Americans ==
Corn, being a staple crop for many Native American tribes has led to corn soup being a primary food among them. M. R. Harrington reported that 1908 hulled-corn soup o^{n}no'kwǎ' was the most popular dish for the Seneca Indians (Native Americans). He also stated, "[s]eldom do the Indians, pagan or Christian, meet for any function [...] without a kettle of o^{n}no'kwǎ', hot and savory, to regale the crowd". The soup was served at religious events, the people getting a ladleful every time they encircled the kettle.

== List of corn soup dishes ==
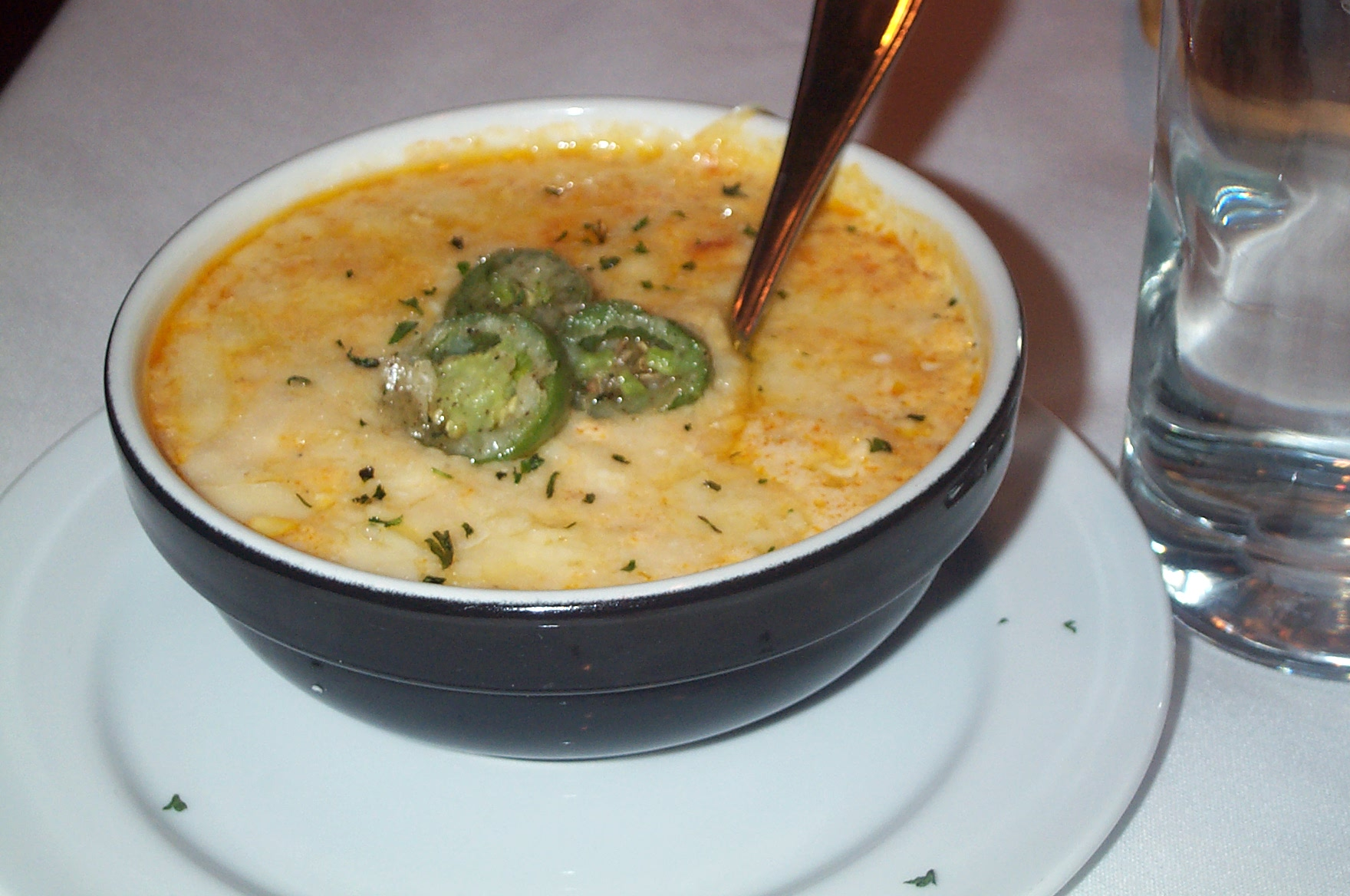
Creamed corn soup in the United States

Several types of soups are prepared using corn as a primary ingredient.

- Cream of corn soup and creamed corn soup
- Sweet corn soup
- Corn crab soup
- Chinese sweet corn soup (yumigeng or sumigeng)
- Dried (Indian) corn soup
- Patasca - Peruvian corn and meat soup
- Pozole - mexican corn soup
- Tibetan style corn soup (Ashom Tang)
- Suam na mais
- Ginataang mais
- Chicken Corn Soup (A Pennsylvania Dutch soup with hard-boiled egg whites instead of noodles)

== See also ==
- Corn chowder
- Corn stew
- List of maize dishes
- List of soups
