= Api (beverage) =

Pre-Columbian corn beverage from Argentina, Bolivia, and Peru

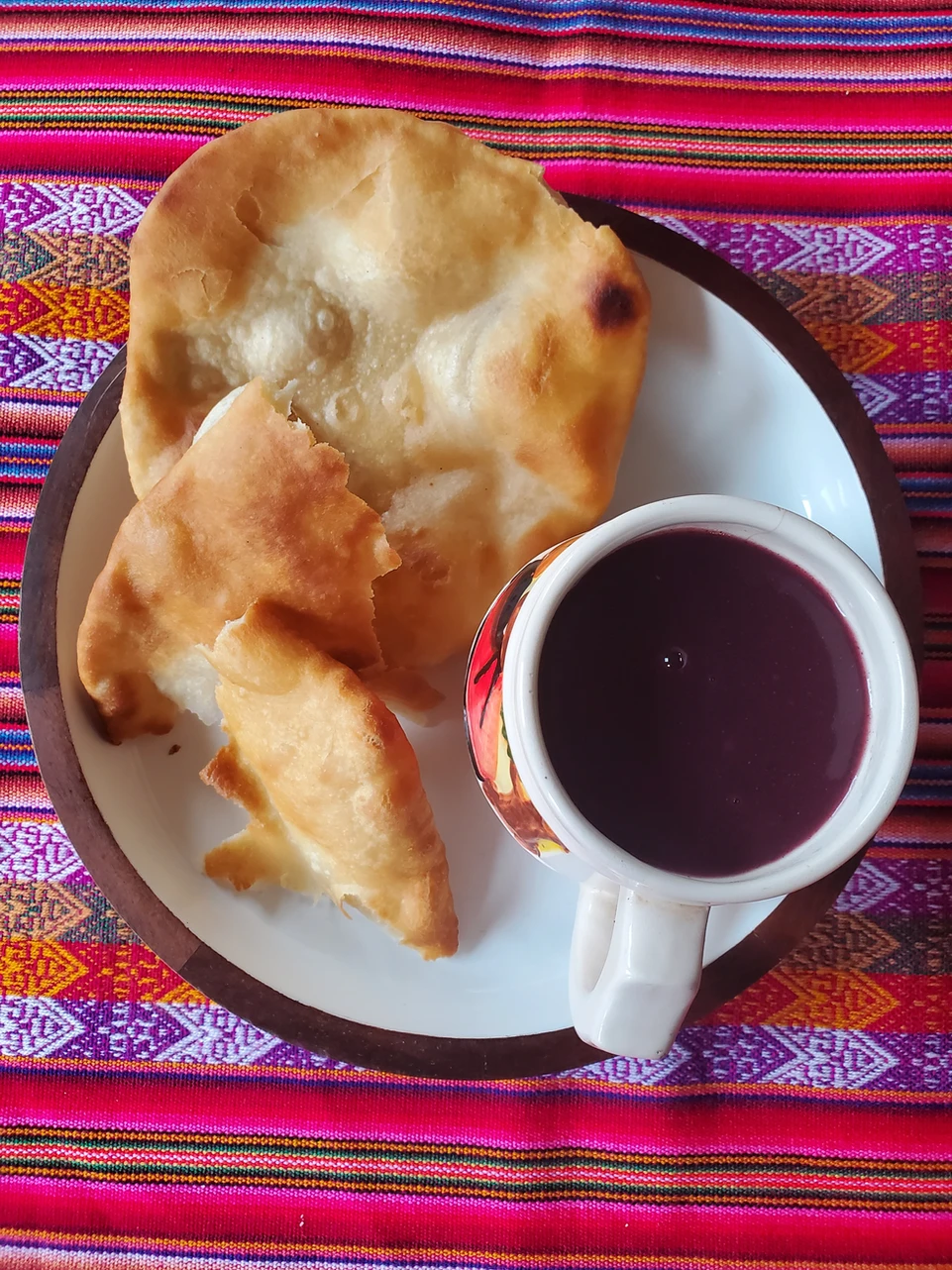
- Api with cachangas, Peru
- Type: Beverage
- Origin: Pre-Columbian; Bolivia; Peru; Argentina
- Color: Purple
- Ingredients: Purple corn, yellow corn, sugar, pineapple, cinnamon, cloves

Api ([ˈapi], from Quechua api, meaning 'mazamorra'), also known as api morado (purple api) is a sweet beverage of pre-Columbian origin that is still consumed in modern Argentina, Bolivia, and Peru. It is made with purple corn, which gives it its characteristic flavor and color. Yellow corn, sugar, cinnamon in branches and cloves are sometimes added as well. It is generally served hot, but there is also a cold version.

Api consumption occurs since pre-Columbian times. One of the oldest mentions of the beverage was by the chronicler Inca Garcilaso de la Vega, who wrote that the native peoples of the Viceroyalty of Peru consumed it in solid form:

También hacían gachas, que llaman api, y las comían con grandísimo regocijo, diciéndoles mil donaires, porque era muy raras veces.

They also made a mush, which they call api, and loved to eat it, praising it a lot, because they rarely had such opportunity.

— Inca Garcilaso de la Vega, Comentarios reales

== Argentina ==
In Argentina, it is consumed in the provinces of Jujuy, Salta, Tucumán and parts of Catamarca. The Tilcara Market in Jujuy is considered one of the best places to try api. Bags of dried api for preparation with hot water can also be found in the country.

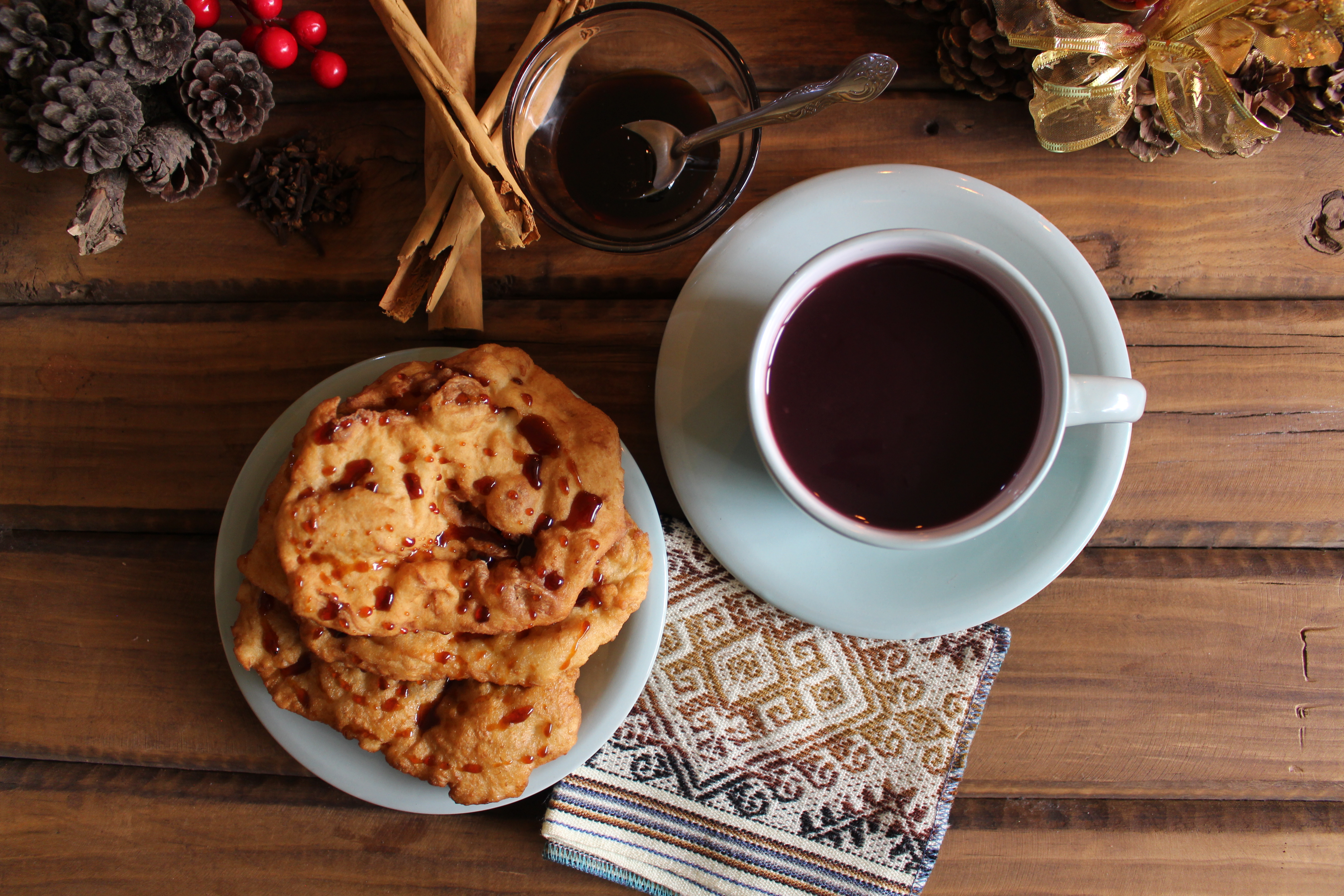
In Bolivia, api is often accompanied by cane syrup buñuelos (beignets)

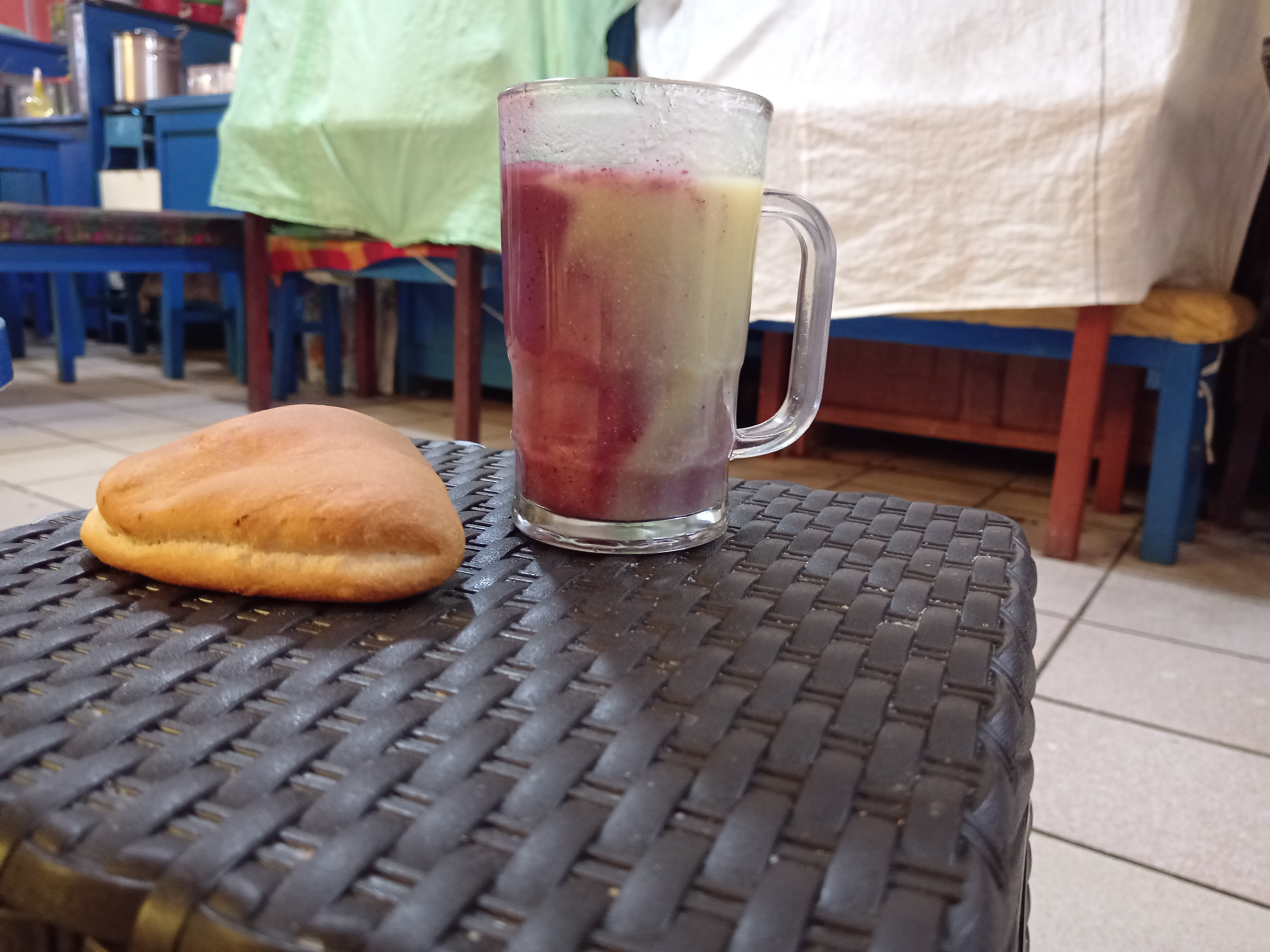
Mixed api of purple and white corn

== Bolivia ==
In Bolivia, it is traditionally consumed in the Andean region, in the departments of Oruro, La Paz, Potosí, and Cochabamba. Since the late 20th century, consumption has been expanding to the country's eastern and southern areas, including Santa Cruz, Tarija, Chuquisaca, Beni, Pando and the Chaco boliviano (Bolivian swamp region). Even though consumption is not as common in those regions, they have different ways of preparing and serving it. It is widely sold in the Feria de la Alasita in La Paz and in the markets of Oruro. Its smell can be felt in bus terminals, in the dawn of the Oruro carnival (together with the té con té), and in the cold afternoons of the Bolivian Altiplano.

== Peru ==
In Peru it is consumed mainly in the southern departments of Arequipa, Cusco, Moquegua, Puno, and Tacna. Its flavor is often improved with sliced fruit such as quince, apples, pineapples, or pineapple bark or lemon juice. It traditionally accompanies a fried bread called cachanga.

== See also ==
- Colada morada
- Mazamorra
