= Corn chowder =

Creamy corn soup from the United States

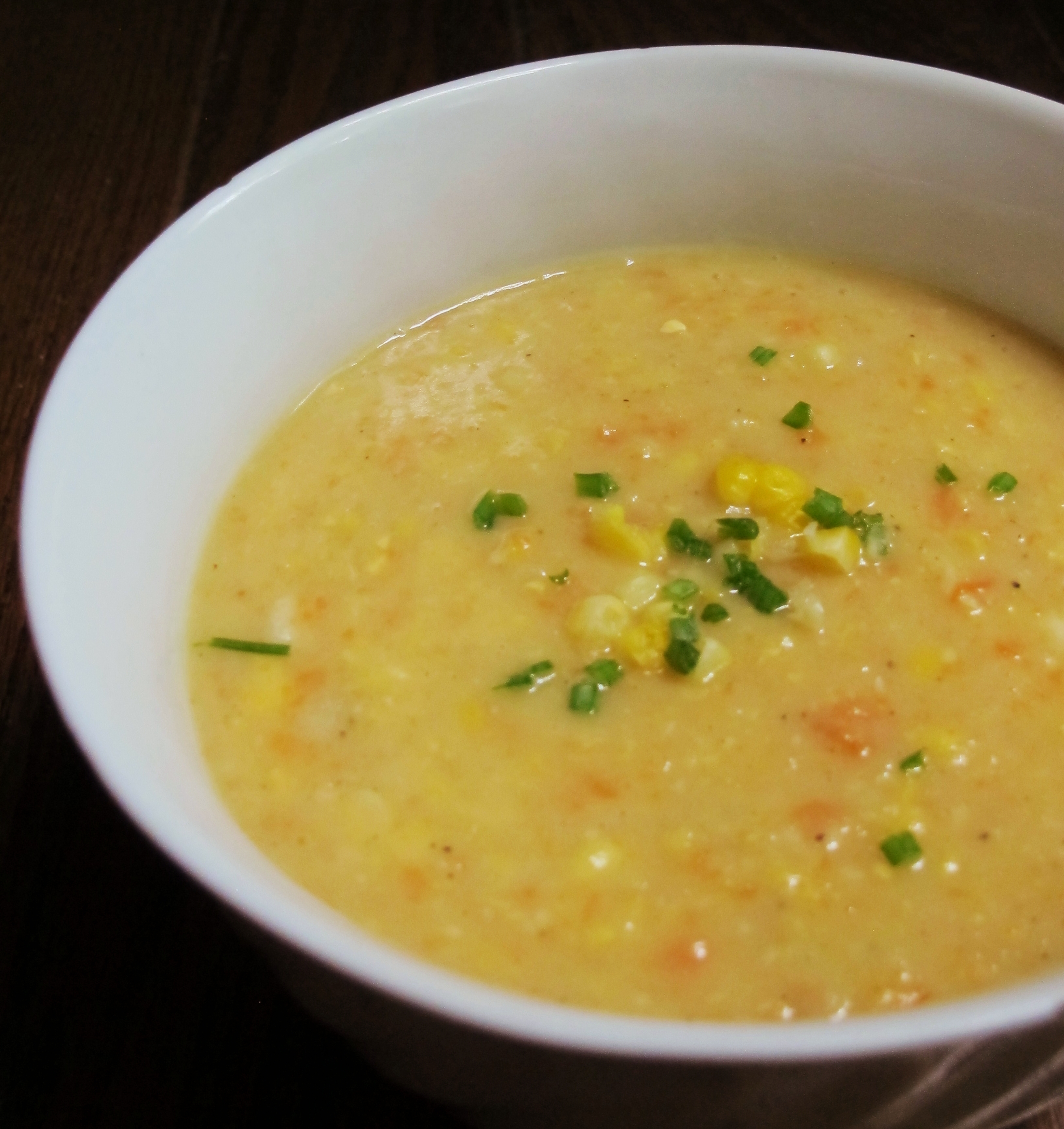
- Corn chowder topped with chives
- Type: Chowder
- Place of origin: United States
- Main ingredients: Corn, milk or cream, onion, celery, sometimes potatoes or squash

Corn chowder is a chowder soup prepared using corn as a primary ingredient. Basic corn chowder is commonly made of corn, onion, celery, milk or cream, and butter. Additional ingredients sometimes used include potatoes or squash, salt pork, fish, seafood and chicken. In the United States, recipes for corn chowder date to at least as early as 1884. Corn chowder is mass-produced as a canned food in the U.S.

== Overview ==
Corn chowder is a thick cream-based soup or chowder. It is similar to New England clam chowder, with corn used in place of clams in the recipe. Basic ingredients in corn chowder include corn, chopped onion and celery, milk or cream, butter, flour, salt and pepper. Fresh shucked corn with the corn kernels sliced off, canned corn and frozen corn can be used to prepare the dish. In addition to corn, it often contains potatoes, and additional vegetables can also be used. The potatoes can aid in thickening the soup. Chicken stock can also be used as an ingredient, as can salt pork, bacon, crackers and corn starch, the latter as a thickener.

Corn cobs can be used as an ingredient when preparing fresh stock for the dish, and cooking them down can also serve to thicken the soup. Various fish and seafoods are sometimes used as ingredients in corn chowder, and chicken is also sometimes used. Some people serve basic corn chowder as a vegetarian alternative to clam chowder.

== History ==
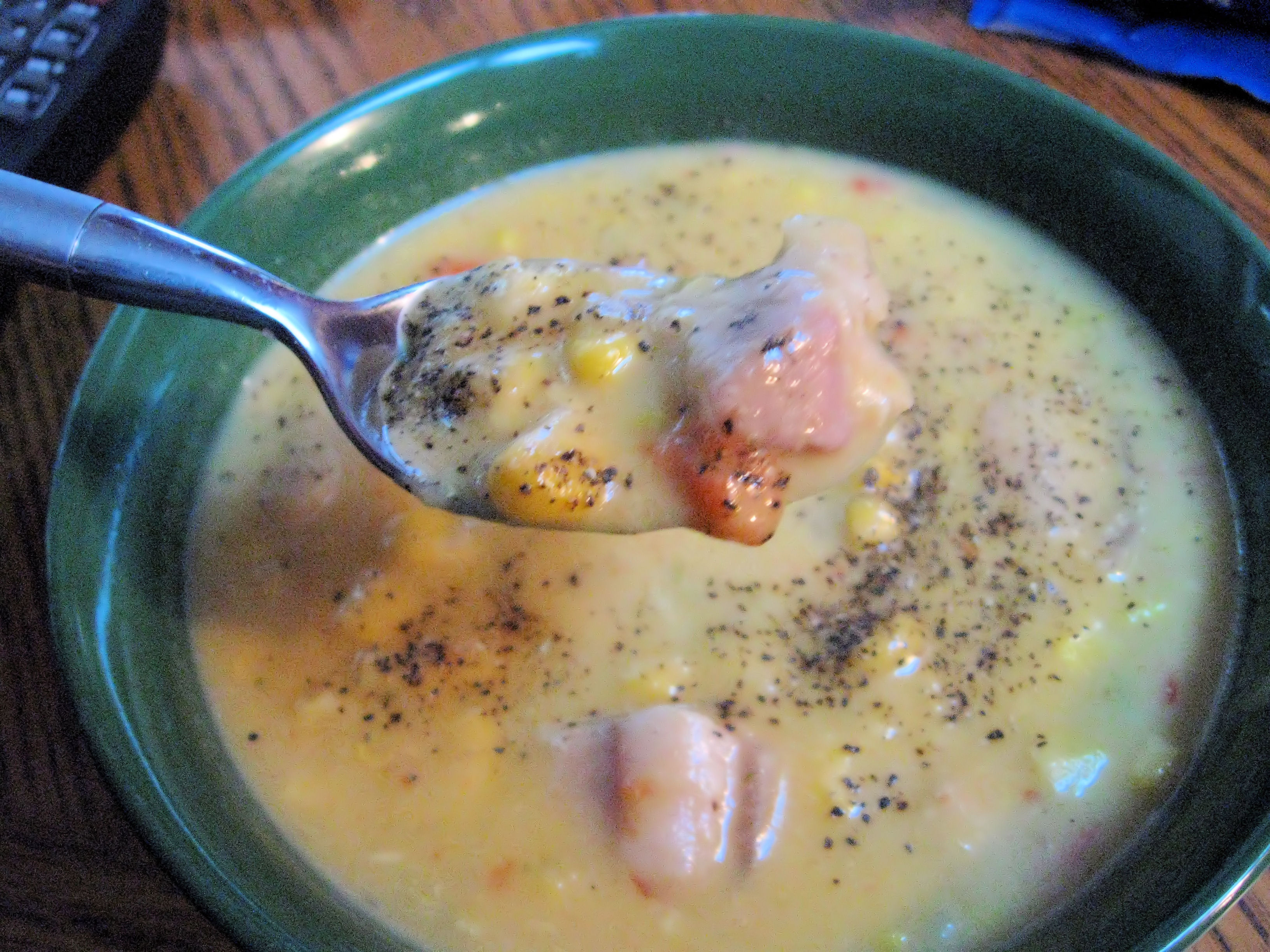
Corn chowder with potatoes, topped with black pepper

In the United States, recipes for corn chowder date back to at least 1884, at which time a corn chowder recipe was published in the Boston Cook Book, authored by Mary Lincoln of the Boston Cooking School. Another corn chowder recipe was published in the Boston Cooking-School Cook Book in 1896, which was authored by Fannie Farmer, Lincoln's successor at the Boston Cooking School. Farmer's recipe utilized canned corn, a product that emerged around the mid-1800s in the U.S. The 1896 recipe also included salt pork, potatoes and crackers as ingredients. After Lincoln's published recipe in 1884, myriad recipes for corn chowder began circulating in various cookbooks in the United States, with many types of recipe variations. For example, some recipes utilized cream, milk or condensed milk, and thickeners included the use of flour or eggs.

Around the early 1900s, the Shakers were well known for their chowder soups and general culinary skills. A simple Shakers recipe from this time period for corn chowder used just three ingredients: cream, butter and fresh corn.

== Mass production ==
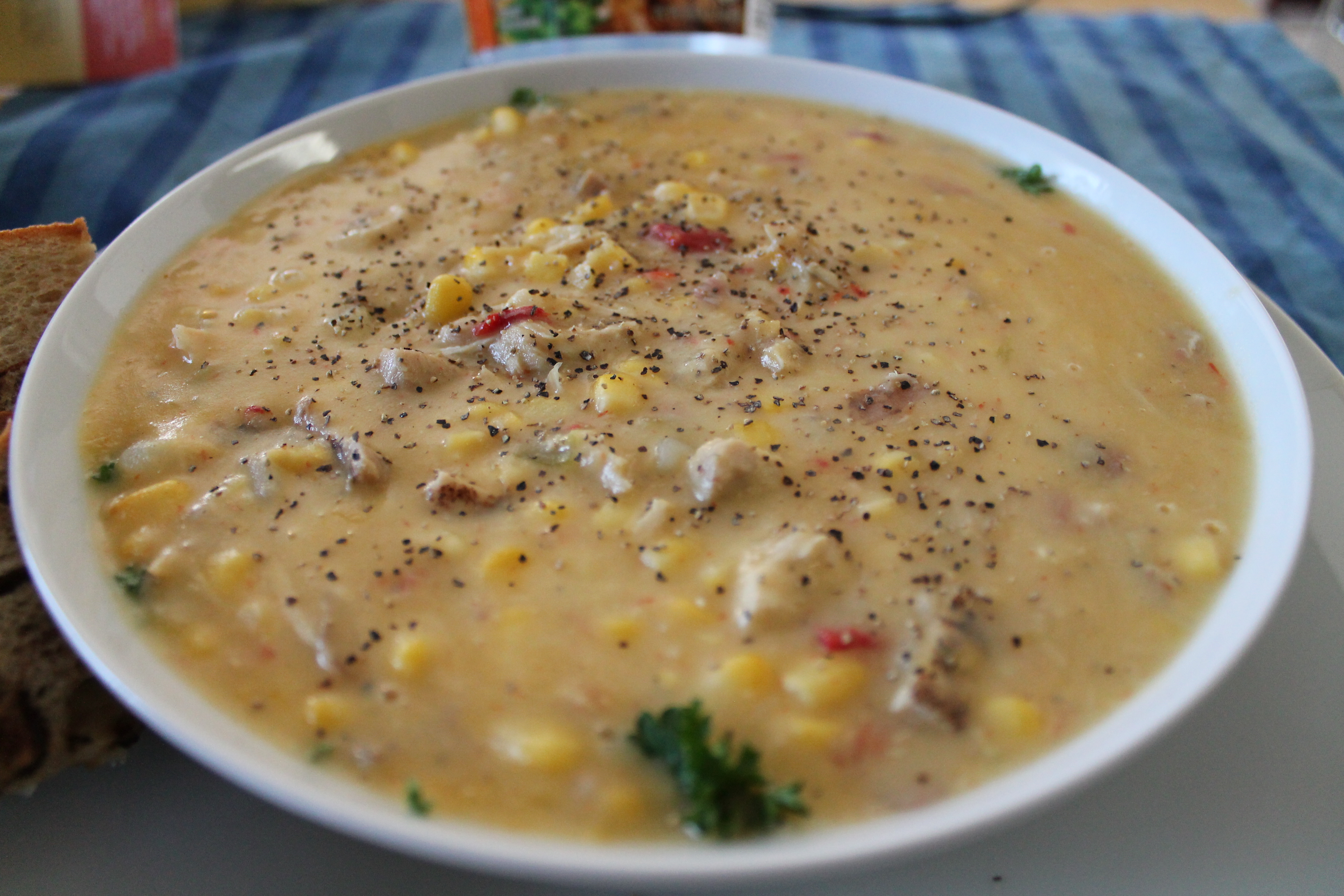
A bowl of heated "Signature Cafe" canned corn chowder, a mass-produced store brand marketed by Safeway Inc. The dish here is topped with additional scallions, pepper and a sprig of parsley.

Corn chowder is a mass-produced canned food product in the United States. The Campbell's manufactures and markets prepared canned soup products named "Sweet Potato Corn Chowder", "Campbell's Healthy Request Chunky Corn Chowder", "Campbell's Chunky Chicken Corn Chowder" and "Clam and Corn Chowder with Bacon."

Progresso, a General Mills brand, manufactures and markets corn chowders, such as "Rich & Hearty Chicken Corn Chowder" and "Light Chicken Corn Chowder."

Costco markets a corn chowder under its Kirkland Signature brand name, named "Kirkland Roasted Corn Chowder."

Safeway Inc. markets a corn chowder under their "Signature Cafe" store brand.

== Gallery ==
Corn chowders

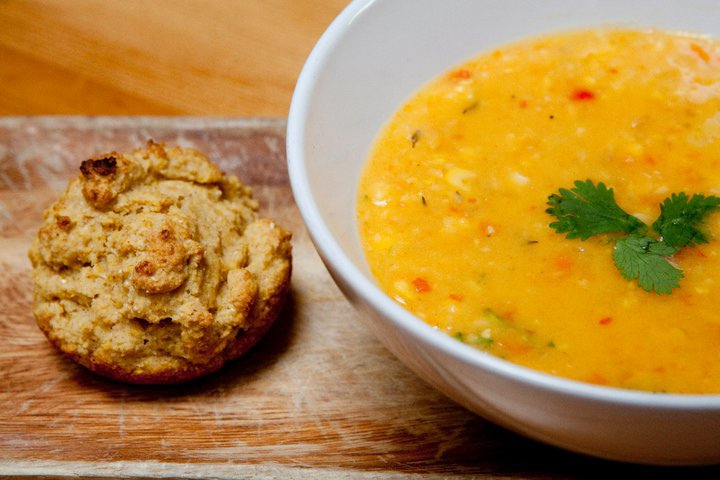
Vegan corn chowder with cornbread

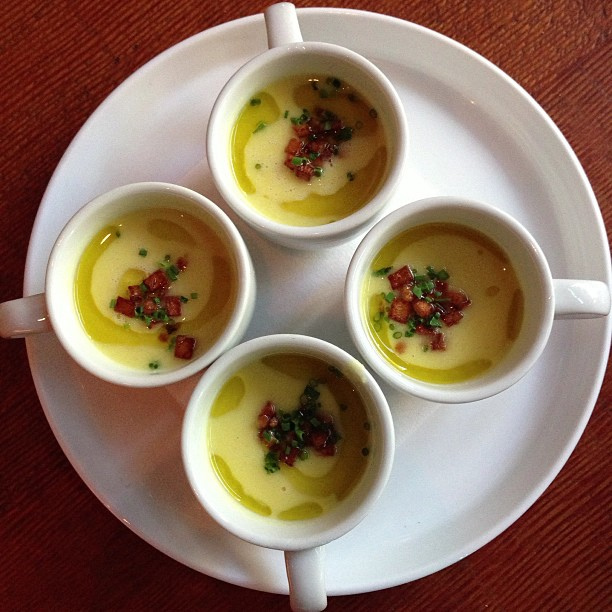
Cups of corn chowder with bacon, potato, olive oil and chives

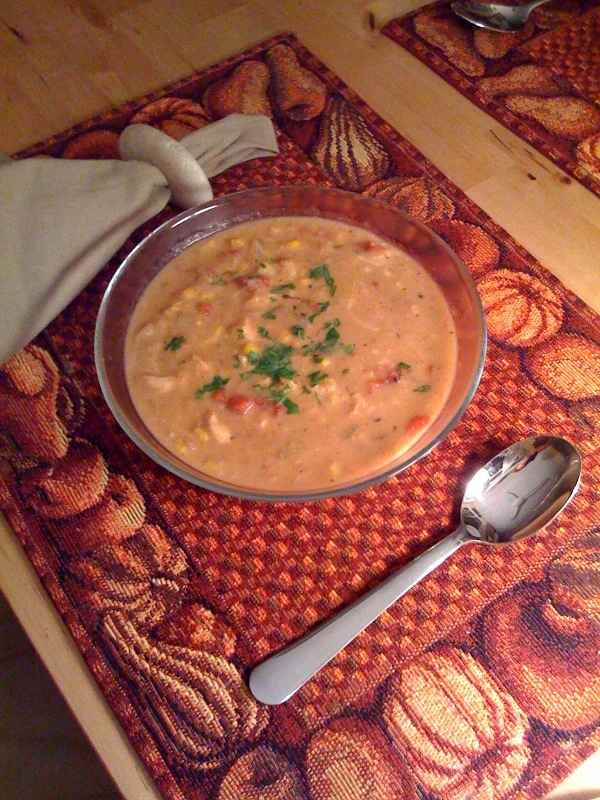
Mexican chicken corn chowder

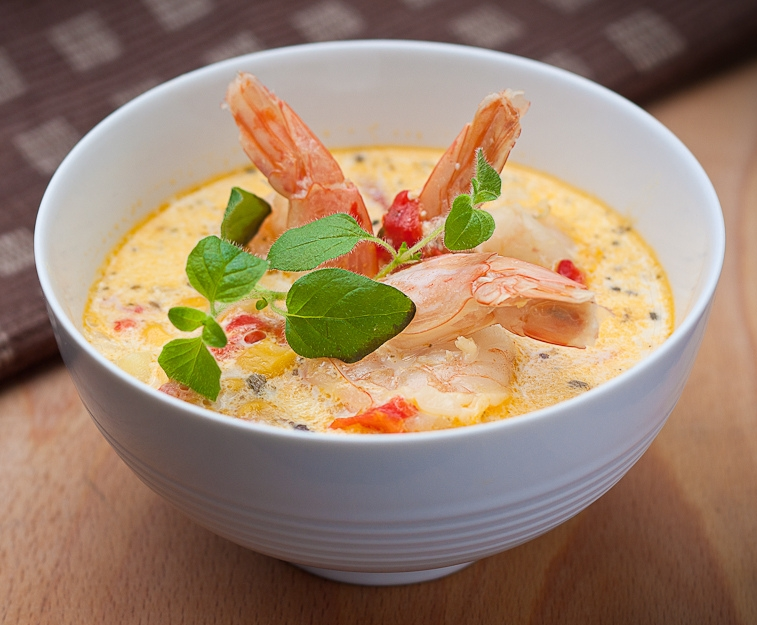
Corn chowder with shrimp

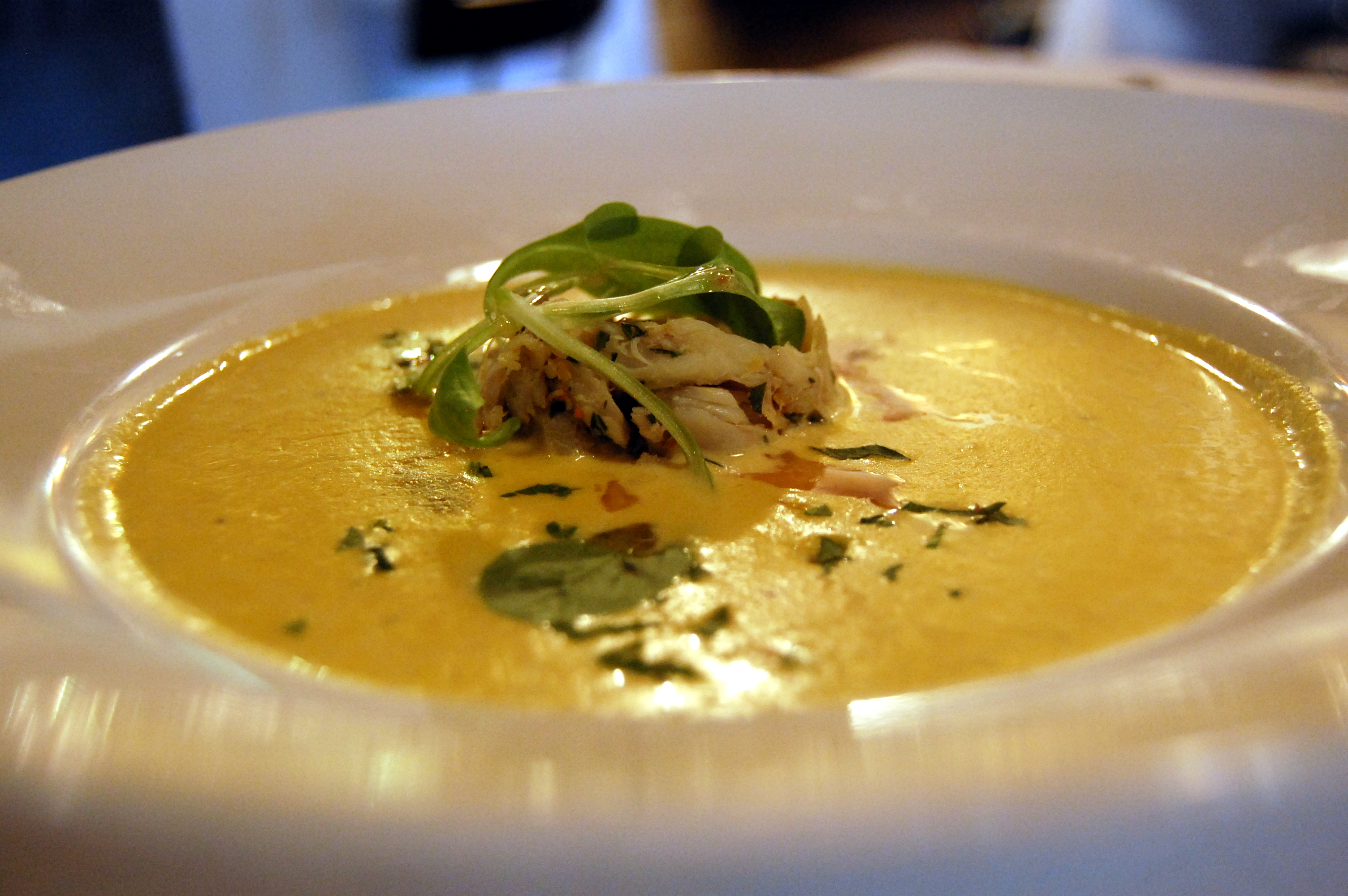
Corn chowder with crab meat

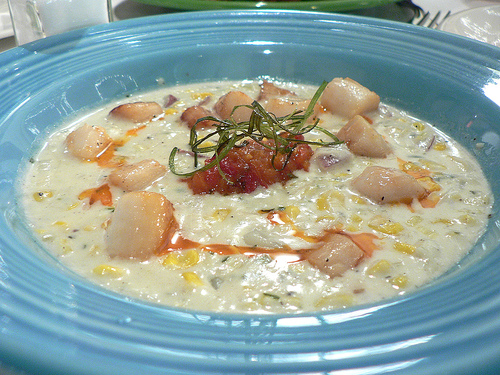
Corn chowder with scallops

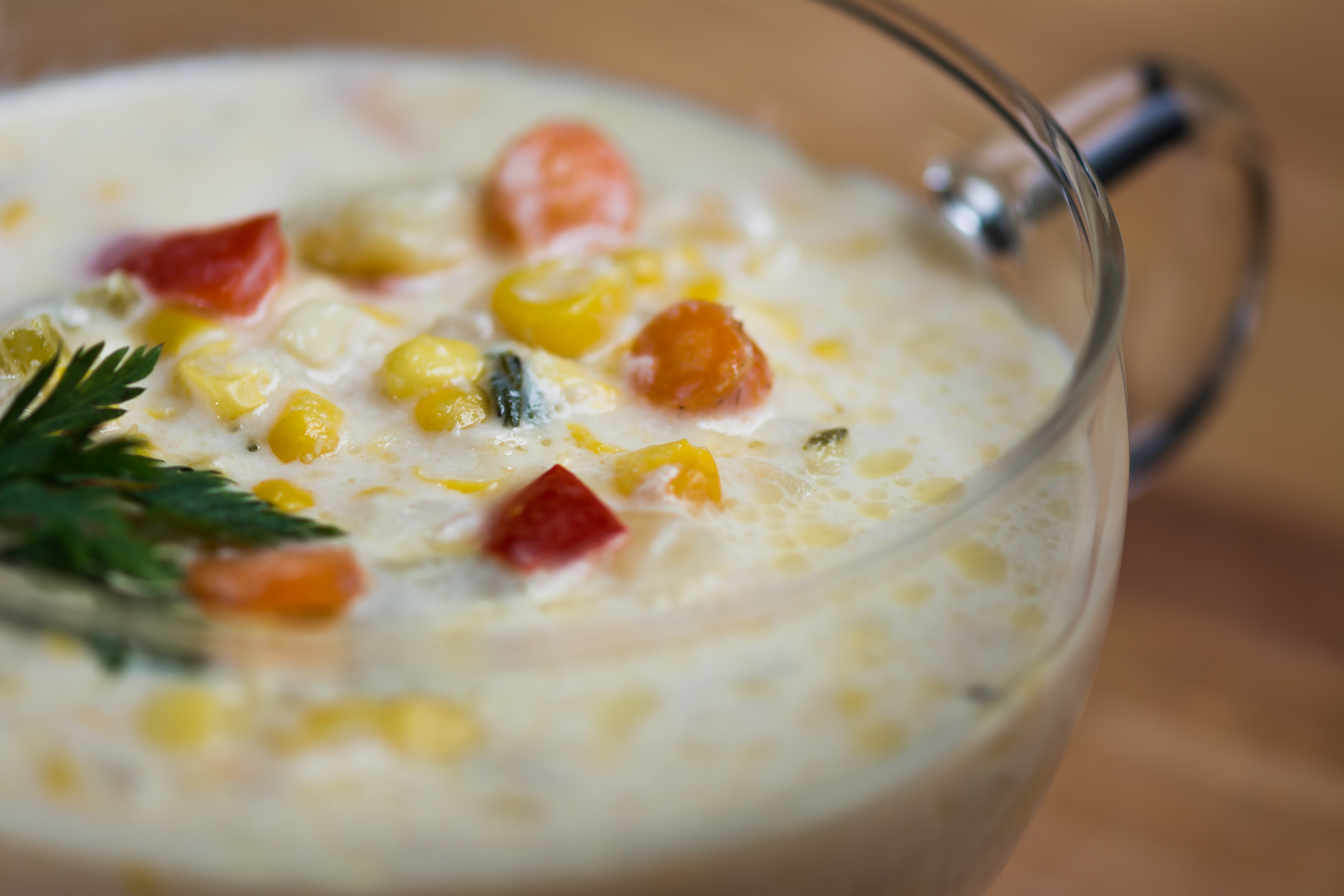
Corn chowder with diced carrot, bell pepper, and parsley

== See also ==
- Corn soup
- Corn crab soup
- Corn stew
- Creamed corn
- List of cream soups
- List of maize dishes
- List of soups
- List of stews
