= Corn stew =

Thick stew made with maize

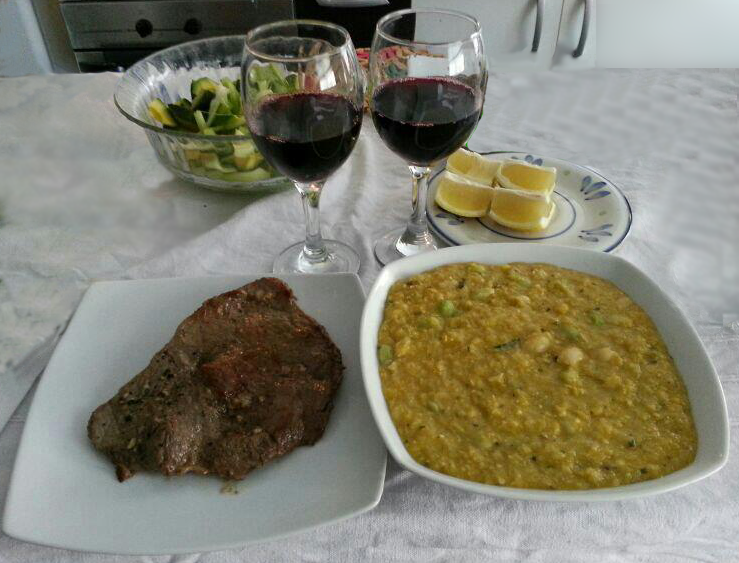
Mazamorra (at right, in Chile) is a type of corn stew. The version in the image is prepared with maize and beans

Corn stew is a stew prepared with corn (maize) as a primary ingredient. Many variations exist in ingredient usage and in methods of preparation. Corn stew is a dish in several cuisines of the world. Mazamorra is a historically old corn stew dish in South America that is prepared using simple ingredients, and is a dish in several other cuisines.

== Overview ==
Corn is a main ingredient in corn stew. Many variations of corn stew exist. A simple corn stew version consists of corn stewed with milk, butter, flour and salt. Additional ingredients used in corn soups include potato, beans, hominy, creamed corn, carrot, celery, tomato, onion, scallions, garlic, various stocks, butter, salt and pepper among others. Meats such as chicken, fish, shrimp, sausage and bacon are sometimes included as an ingredient. Some corn stews are prepared using a roux, which creates a thicker consistency and texture. Canned or frozen corn and other canned foods such as tomato are sometimes used to prepare corn stew. The flavor of corn stew may improve after a day or more, because aging allows the flavors to intermingle and coalesce with one-another. Corn stews generally have a thicker consistency compared to corn soups.

== In cuisines ==
Corn stew is a dish several cuisines, including the cuisine of the Southern United States, Cajun cuisine, Native American cuisine, such as among the Hopi tribe, and South American cuisine, among others.

== Mazamorra ==
The dish mazamorra is a historically old corn stew dish among the indigenous peoples in South America that is simple to prepare, consisting primarily of dried cracked corn and water. The kernels are typically pounded to break them down into smaller pieces. Depending upon the region, white or yellow corn may be used. The term "mazamorra" itself originates from native peoples in South America. Mazamorra and variations of the dish are a part of the cuisine of Argentina, Brazil, Chile, Colombia, Paraguay, Peru, Uruguay and Venezuela, and in Costa Rica and Puerto Rico. In South American cuisine, mazamorra morada is a sweet version of the dish prepared using blue corn and berries.

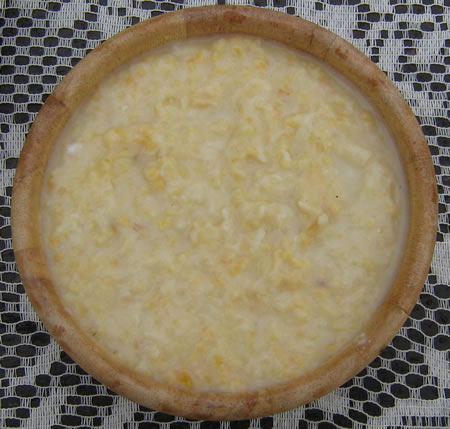
Mazamorra with milk, in Argentina

== See also ==
- Corn chowder
- Corn pudding
- List of maize dishes
- List of stews
- Succotash, a culinary dish consisting primarily of sweet corn with lima beans or other shell beans

== Bibliography ==
- Kijac, M.B. (2003). The South American Table. NYM Series. Harvard Common Press. ISBN 978-1-55832-249-3.
