= Catamarca =

Catamarca may refer to:

- San Fernando del Valle de Catamarca, Argentina
- Catamarca Province, Argentina
- Catamarca-class destroyer, two ships of the Argentine Navy

== See also ==
- Cajamarca (disambiguation)
