= Hogao =

Colombian-style sofrito

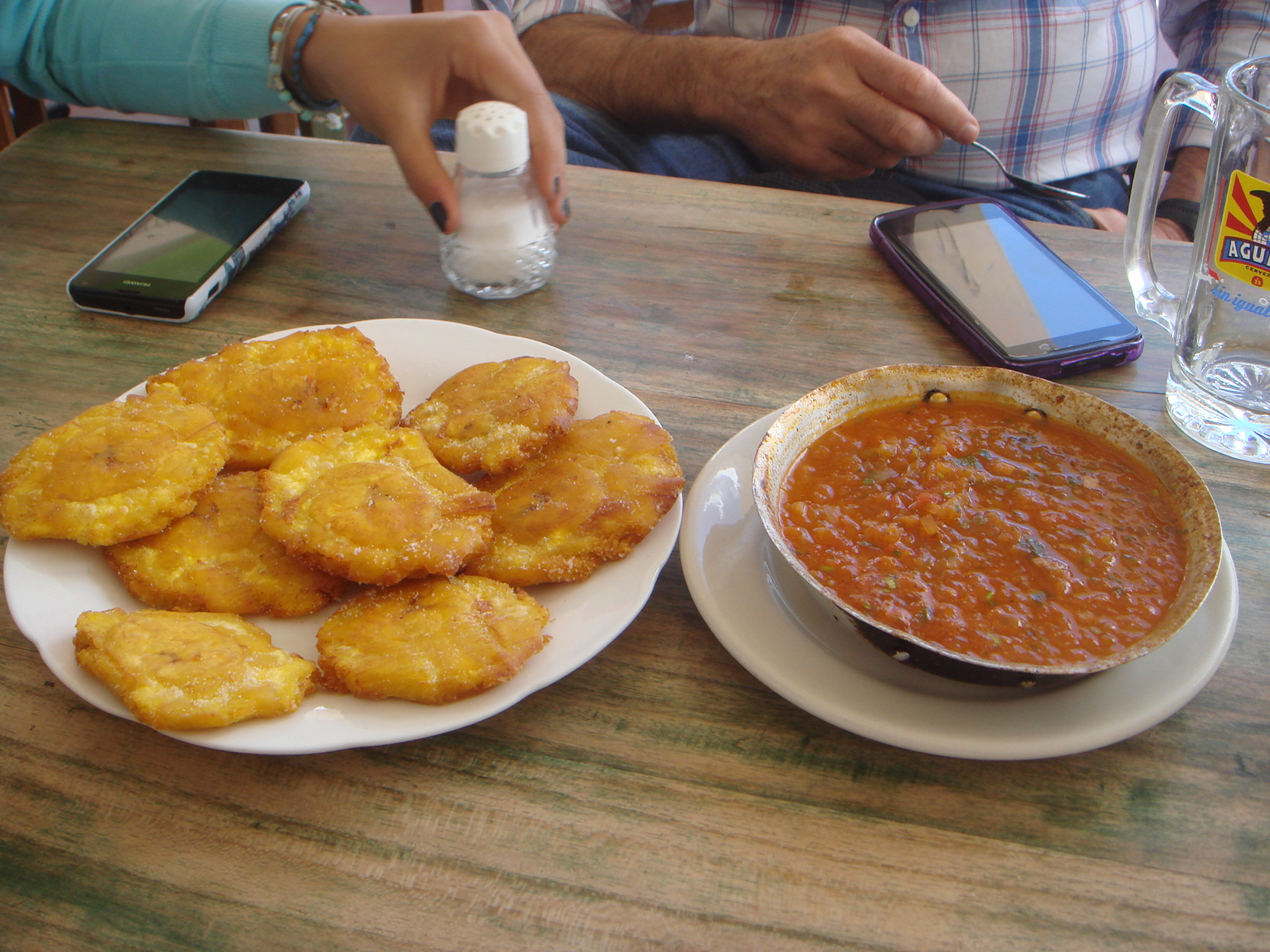
- A table with patacones and hogao
- Place of origin: Colombia
- Region or state: South America
- Associated cuisine: Colombia

Hogao is a variant of Spanish sofrito and is typically used in Colombian cuisine. It is traditionally made with only long green onions and tomatoes, differing from guiso, which can also be made with round onions, garlic, cumin, salt, and pepper that are sauteed over low heat during the cooking process. It is used for meats, arepas, rice, and other dishes, and can complement the famous bandeja paisa. The ingredients and naming tradition varies from region to region, though it is originally from Antioquia and the region whose people are known as paisa. Its name comes from the old use of the verbs ahogar and rehogar that reference a slow cooking technique.

Goya Foods sells bottled hogao commercially in the United States.
