= Bandeja paisa =

Typical meal popular in Colombian cuisine

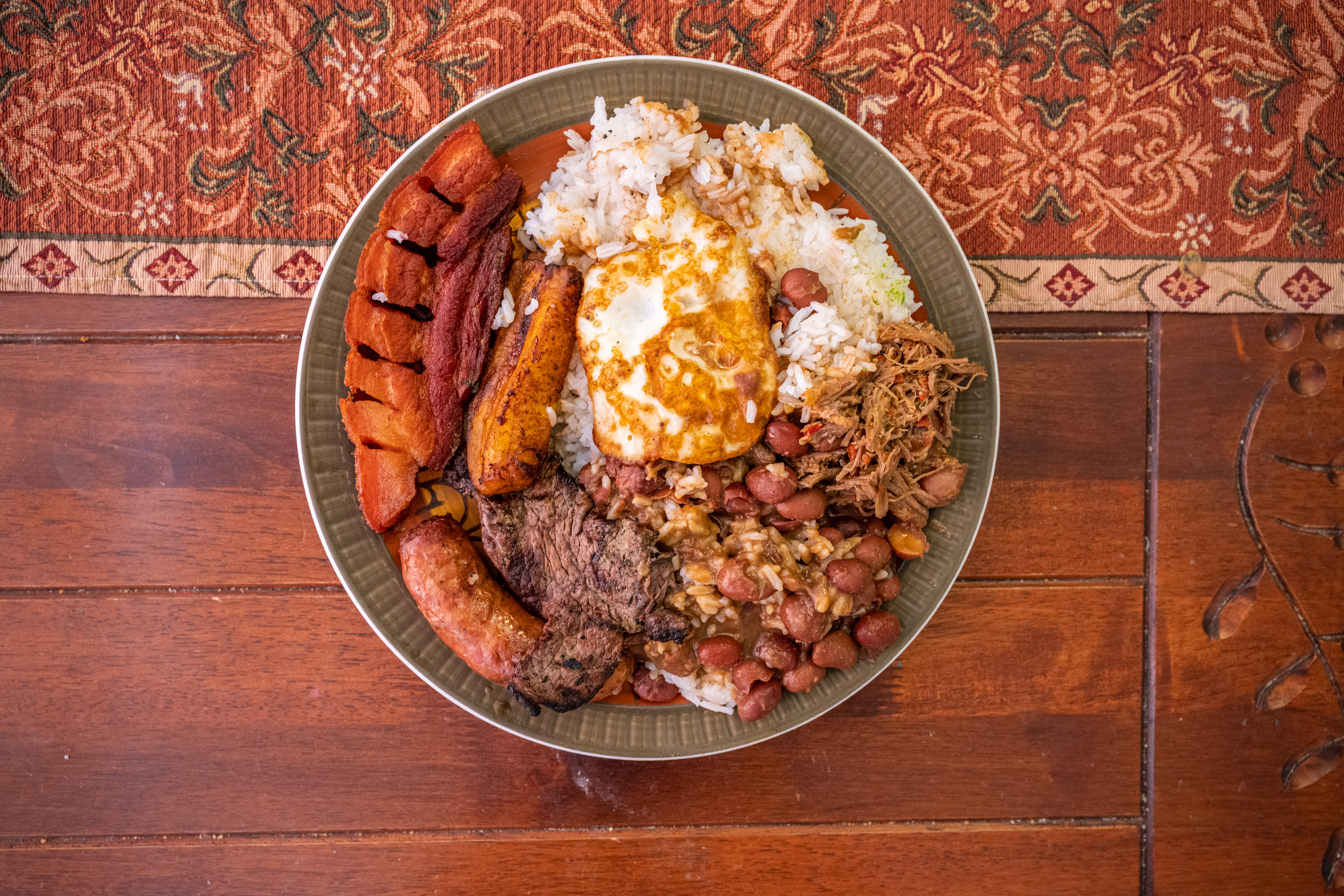
- Bandeja paisa from Restaurante Chócolos in Medellín, Colombia
- Course: Lunch and dinner
- Place of origin: Colombia
- Region or state: Antioquia
- Created by: Countryside people or campesinos
- Serving temperature: Warm, hot
- Main ingredients: Pinto beans, white rice, ground meat, chicharrón, fried egg, plantain (patacones, tajada), chorizo, arepa, black pudding (morcilla), avocado and mazamorra
- Variations: Bandeja de arriero

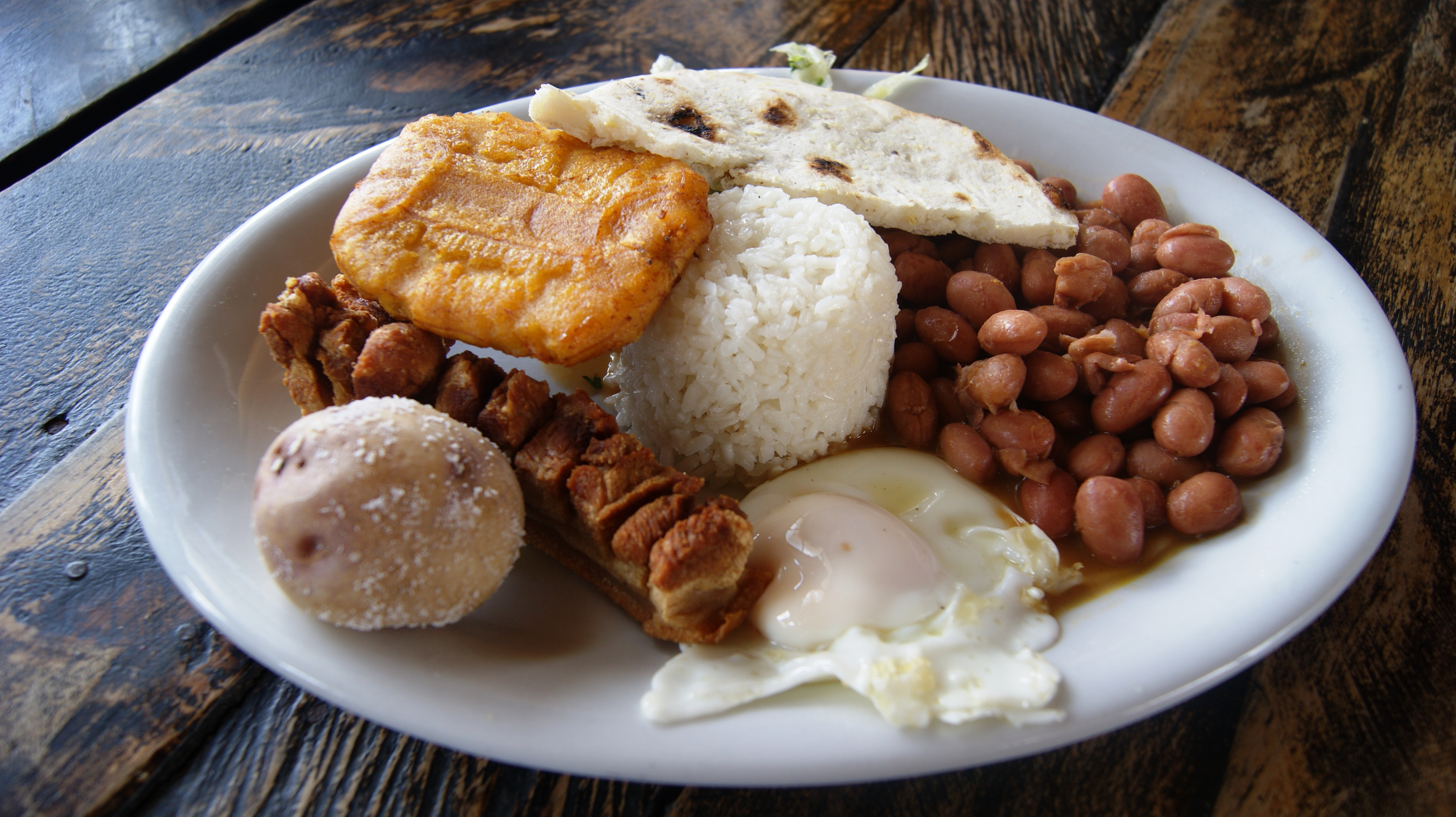
Bandeja paisa from Peñól de Guatapé in Antioquia, Colombia

Bandeja paisa (Spanish pronunciation: [banˌdexa ˈpai̯sa]; lit. 'Paisa platter'), with variations known as bandeja de arriero, bandeja montañera, and bandeja antioqueña, is one of the most representative meals in Colombian cuisine, especially of the Antioquia department and the Paisa region, as well as with the Colombian Coffee-Growers Axis (the departments of Caldas, Quindío and Risaralda, Tolima and Valle del Cauca). Paisa refers to a person from the Paisa region and bandeja is Spanish for platter.

The main characteristic of this dish is the generous amount and variety of food in a traditional bandeja paisa: red beans cooked with pork, white rice, carne molida (ground meat), chicharrón, fried egg, plantain (plátano maduro), chorizo, arepa, hogao sauce, black pudding (morcilla), avocado and lemon. It is served in a platter or a tray.

== Origin ==
The origin of the bandeja paisa was influenced by several different cultures that inhabited Colombia throughout the centuries, including the indigenous peoples of Colombia, as well as colonial Spaniards and Africans. In the 19th century, French and British colonialists also brought their cuisine with them.

The current form and presentation of the Paisa platter is relatively recent. There are no references in the food writing about this dish before 1950. It is probably an interpretation of the local restaurants of simpler peasant dishes. One of its most prominent features is the juxtaposition of native American and European ingredients, which is also observed in other mestizo dishes of Latin American cuisine, such as Venezuelan pabellón criollo or Costa Rican gallo pinto.

== Presentation and variations ==
A Paisa platter is traditionally served in a large, oval-shaped tray due to the large amount of food that is served. Side dishes include mazamorra (a maize-derived beverage similar to atole) with milk and ground panela.

There are several variants of the dish all over the country with deletion or addition of ingredients, which cannot be recognized as bandeja paisa in the strictest sense. Some Antioquian restaurants offer an "extended" bandeja paisa, also known as "seven meats platter", which contains, besides the aforementioned ingredients, grilled steak, grilled pork and liver. A diet-friendly version of the dish is very popular in Bogotá, which replaces pork with grilled chicken breast, skips black pudding and chorizo or replaces it with a wiener.

== Colombian national dish ==
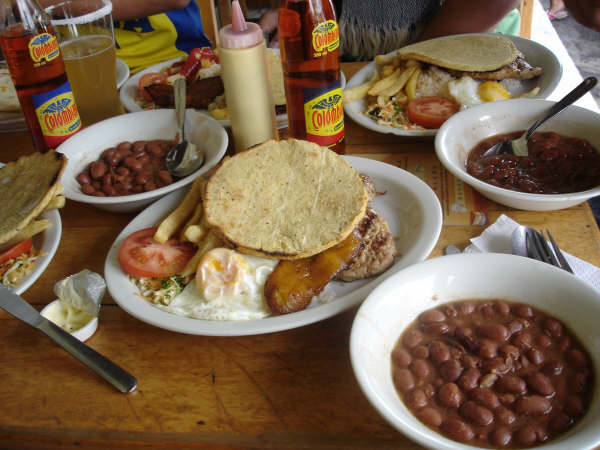
Plate of bandeja paisa with various Colombian dishes.

In 2005, the Colombian government planned to make bandeja paisa the national dish, with the name to be changed to bandeja montañera ("mountain tray") to avoid the exclusion of people from outside the Paisa region. A number of people opposed this designation, arguing that only a small percentage of the Colombian population consumes it on a regular basis and that it originated in only a single region of Colombia (Antioquia). However, the suggested alternative, sancocho, is not a distinctively Colombian dish, as it is known and enjoyed in many other countries, such as Cuba, Venezuela, the Canary Islands, Puerto Rico, the Dominican Republic and Panama. Due to the international ubiquity of sancocho, Colombian ajiaco is often considered the most definitive Colombian dish instead.

Nonetheless, the commercial Colombian tourism industry has pushed ahead without official government sanction by emblazoning ads, menus, and brochure information with imagery of the bandeja paisa as the single most typical Colombian dish.

== See also ==
- Full-course dinner
