= Creaming (cooking) =

Several culinary processes

Creaming refers to several different culinary processes. In baking, it is the blending of ingredients with a softened solid fat. In cooking, it is a dish prepared with a cream sauce.

== Baking ==
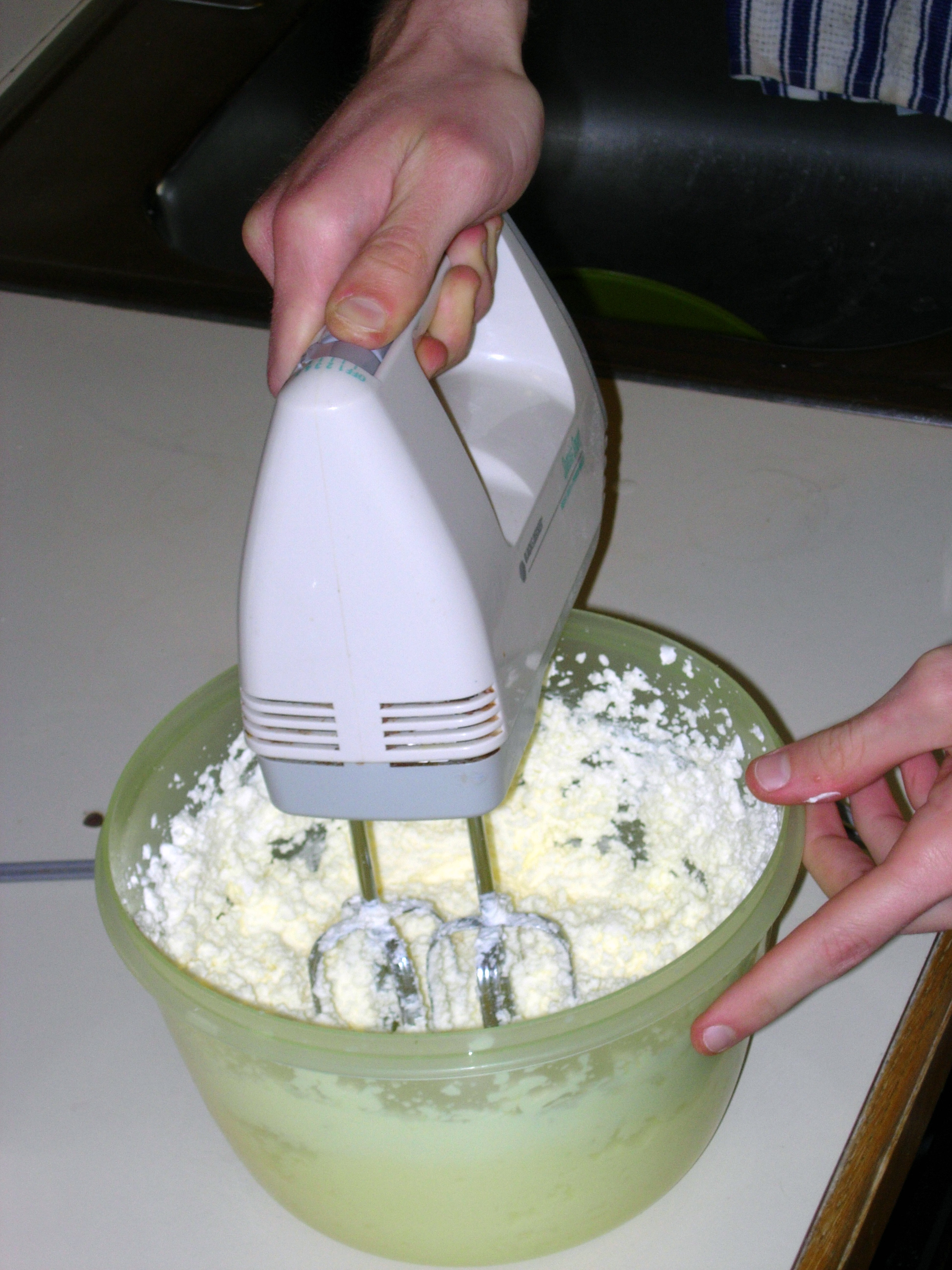
Butter being creamed by electric beaters

In baking, creaming is the technique of softening solid fat, such as shortening or butter, into a smooth mass and then blending it with other ingredients. The technique is most often used in making buttercream, cake batter, or cookie dough. When creaming butter and sugar, beating incorporates air bubbles into the butter, producing a light, fluffy mixture. Locked into the semi-solid fat, these air bubbles remain in the final batter, and expand as the item is baked, serving as a form of leavening agent.

== Cooking ==
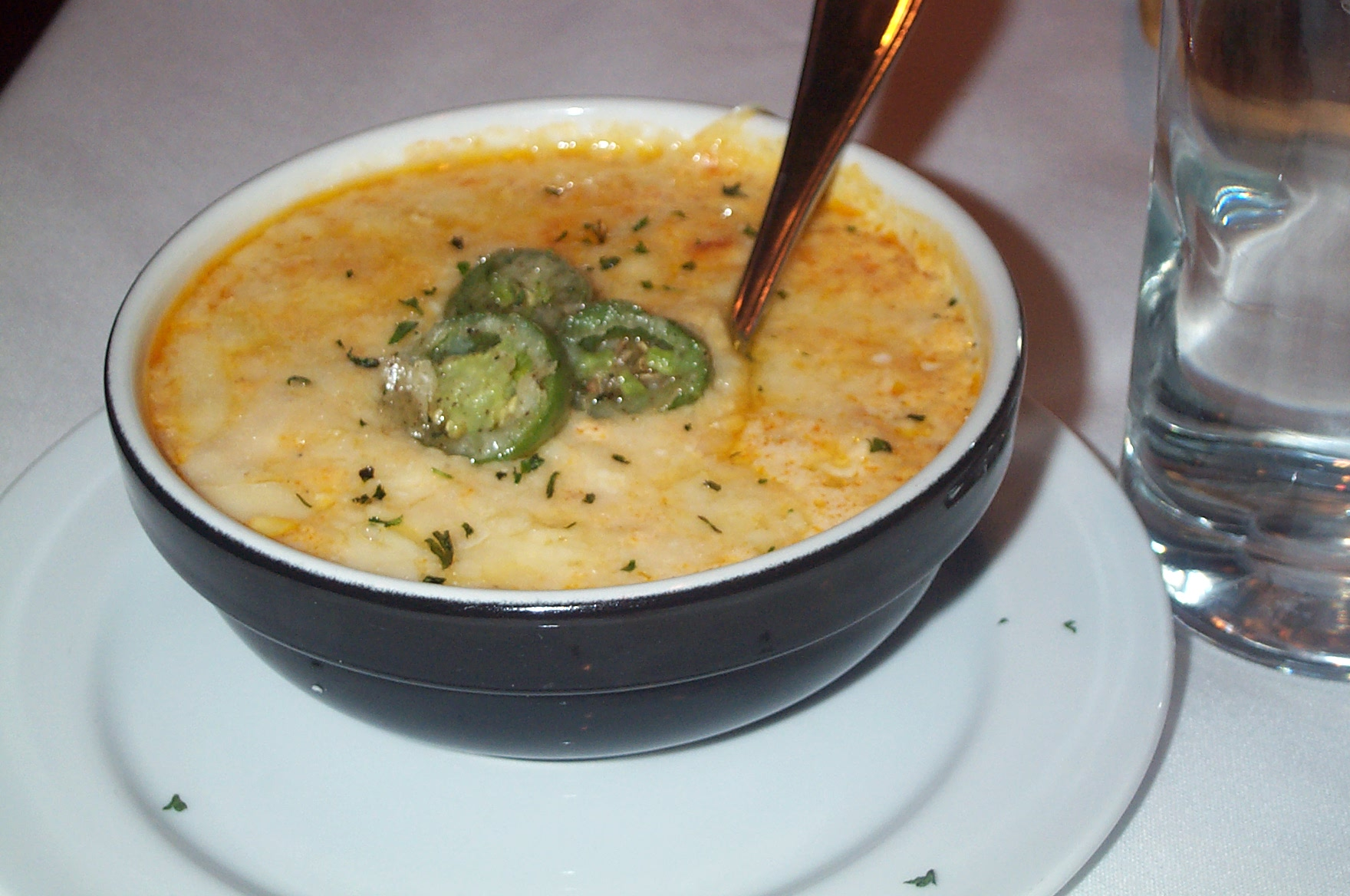
A bowl of creamed corn

In cooking, creaming means preparing a food in creamy sauce. The sauce may be a separately prepared white sauce, it may simply be cream, or may be made by adding cream or milk to a mixture already containing flour or cornstarch.

Creamed corn uses no milk or cream, only the liquid "milk" from mashed corn kernels.

== See also ==
- Emulsion
- Whipped cream
