= Mazamorra =

Dish from Spain and Hispanic America

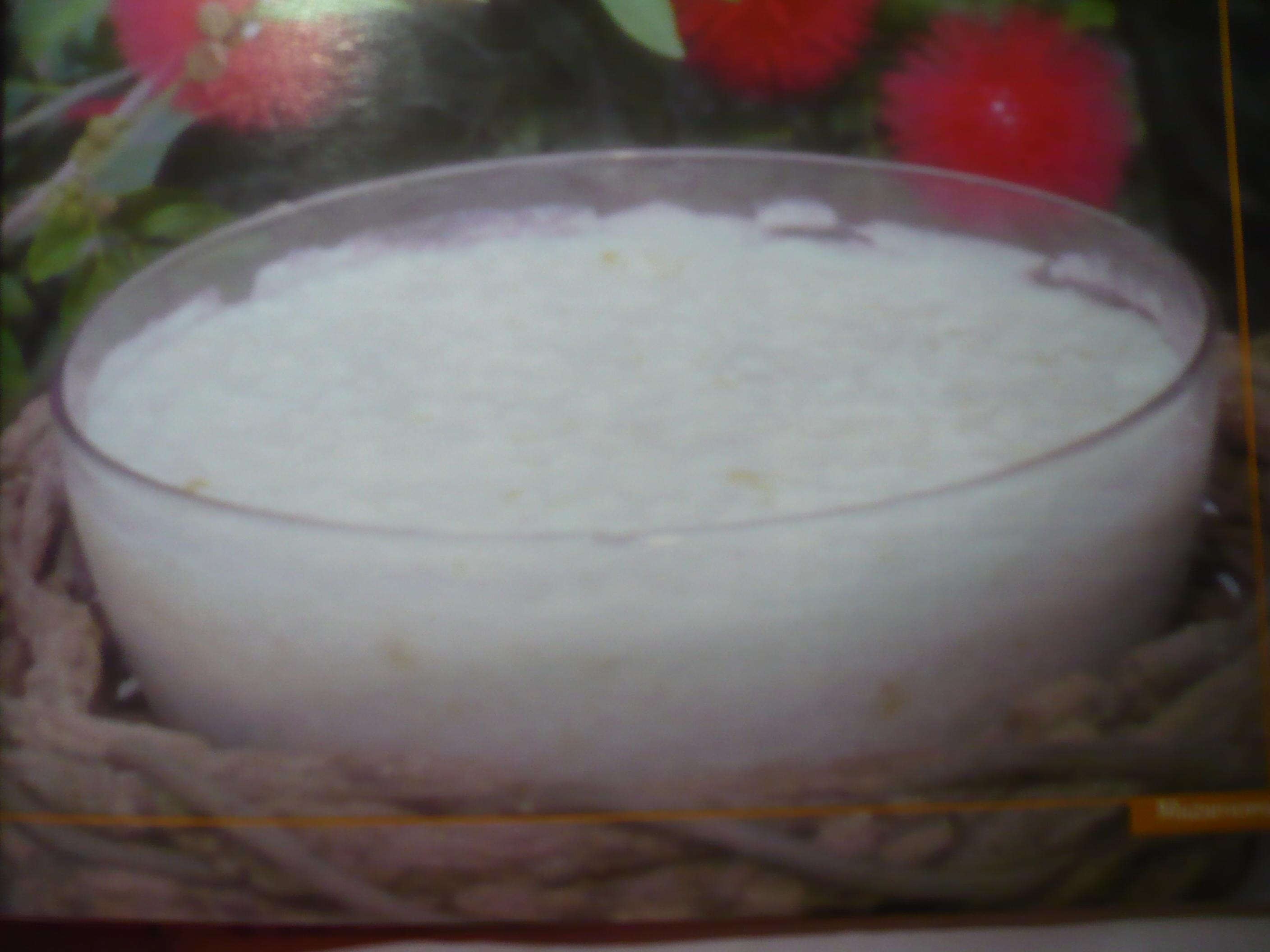
- Alternative names: Peto, kaguyjy
- Type: Non-alcoholic beverage
- Course: Drink, dessert
- Region or state: Spain and Hispanic America

Mazamorra, or masamorra, (from Andalusian Arabic: بسمة, romanized: pičmáṭ, from Ancient Greek: παξαμάδιον, romanized: paxamádion, lit. 'little cookie', influenced by Spanish masa, 'dough') is the name for numerous traditional dishes in the Spanish and Hispanic American regional cuisines.

== Regional variations ==
=== Spain ===
- In Andalusia it is a cold soup similar to ajoblanco. It is made with bread, almonds, garlic, olive oil and vinegar.
- In La Guardia, Toledo, it is a combination of fried vegetables.

=== Argentina ===
In Argentina, mazamorra is a traditional dessert with native roots made with white maize, water, sugar, and vanilla. A variant, the most consumed in the country, is mazamorra with milk. In this recipe, milk is added to the previous ingredients.

Argentinian mazamorra is usually made with the same boiled maize used to make locro.

As with locro, it is common to eat mazamorra on national holidays, like 25 May and Independence Day.

=== Colombia ===
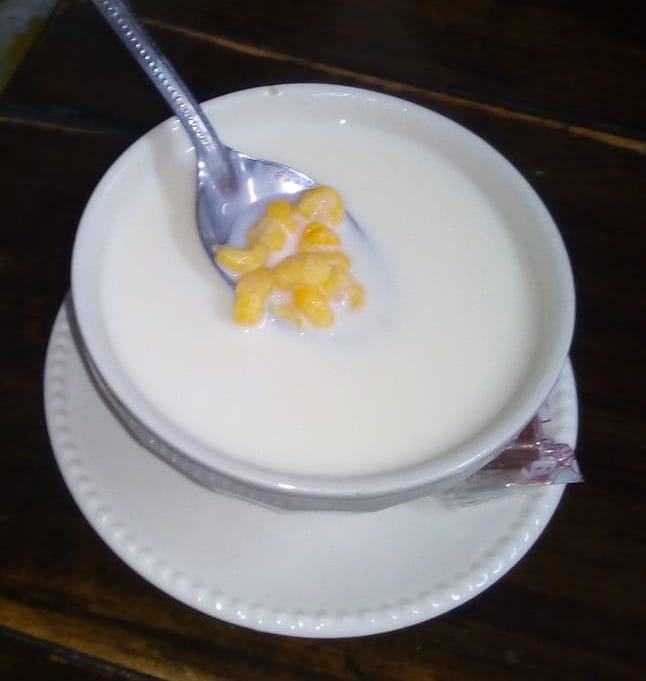
Mazamorra as served in Antioquia

Initially, mazamorra was the stew which fed galeotes (the rowers, almost always forced, in the ships called galeras) and sailors. The dish consisted of any available vegetables, most often peppers, lentils, and chickpeas, cooked together. In central Colombia, there is still a type of vegetable stew with this name.

Today, however, Colombian mazamorra is more commonly a corn-based beverage, with different presentations in various parts of the country. For many Colombian speakers, it is simply very well-cooked peeled corn, also known as peto in the Colombian Caribbean region. Its texture and appearance vary depending on the region, but usually, mazamorra has a white or yellow appearance according to the maize that is used; its texture is generally soft and mushy.

In Antioquia, it often accompanies panela and is a side dish to meals such as bandeja paisa. The drink typically includes maize kernels, crushed with mortar and pestle, then soaked in water with lye (although the traditional reagent used is fern ash, which contains high amounts of potassium carbonate), and finally cooked until soft.

In Colombia, mazamorra is commonly served for lunch and dinner at any time of year, as an accompaniment or as a main dish, whether familiar or casual. It is usually sold as street food. Usually, the consumer adds the milk and the panela to the mazamorra base.

In Cundinamarca and Boyacá, the corn is cooked with onions, coriander, garlic, faba beans, potatoes and mashuas, often with pieces of ribs or beef. This dish is known as mazamorra chiquita (small mazamorra).

=== Dominican Republic and Cuba ===
In the Dominican Republic and Cuba this dish is known as majarete. Corn is cut off the husk, blended with milk, butter, water, sugar, and cornstarch. It is then boiled until thick with cinnamon sticks.

In Cuba, raisins, vanilla, and lemon zest can be added. Once cooled the pudding is garnished with nutmeg and cinnamon. Both countries claim to have originated the dish. Due to migration between the two countries the origin is lost.

In the Dominican Republic, when the corn is left whole, it is known as chaca and cooked rice can be added.

=== Ecuador ===
In Ecuador, also known as colada—most famously colada morada—is a thick, spiced, fruit-based drink prepared for Día de los Difuntos (Nov. 2), made with purple corn flour, fruits like mortiño, pineapple, and naranjilla, and flavored with cinnamon, cloves, and other spices, traditionally served warm with guaguas de pan (bread shaped like babies). Mazamorra, by contrast, is a simpler, pudding-like dish made from corn (white, yellow, or choclo) cooked with milk, sugar or panela, and sometimes fruit, eaten as a dessert or breakfast; while both are corn-based Andean traditions, colada is festive and complex, and mazamorra is everyday, creamy, and porridge-like.

=== Paraguay ===
Also known as kaguyjy in Guaraní, mazamorra in Paraguay is made with the native locro variety of maize. It is one of the most traditional desserts of the country. According with the ingredients added to the cooked corn, the dish is called kaguyjy eírare (honey mazamorra), kaguyjy kambýre (milk mazamorra) or kaguyjy asukáre (sugar mazamorra). Kaguyjy reached great popularity in Paraguay due to the food scarcity during the Paraguayan War (between 1864 and 1870) as a nutritious substitute for a regular meal.

=== Peru ===
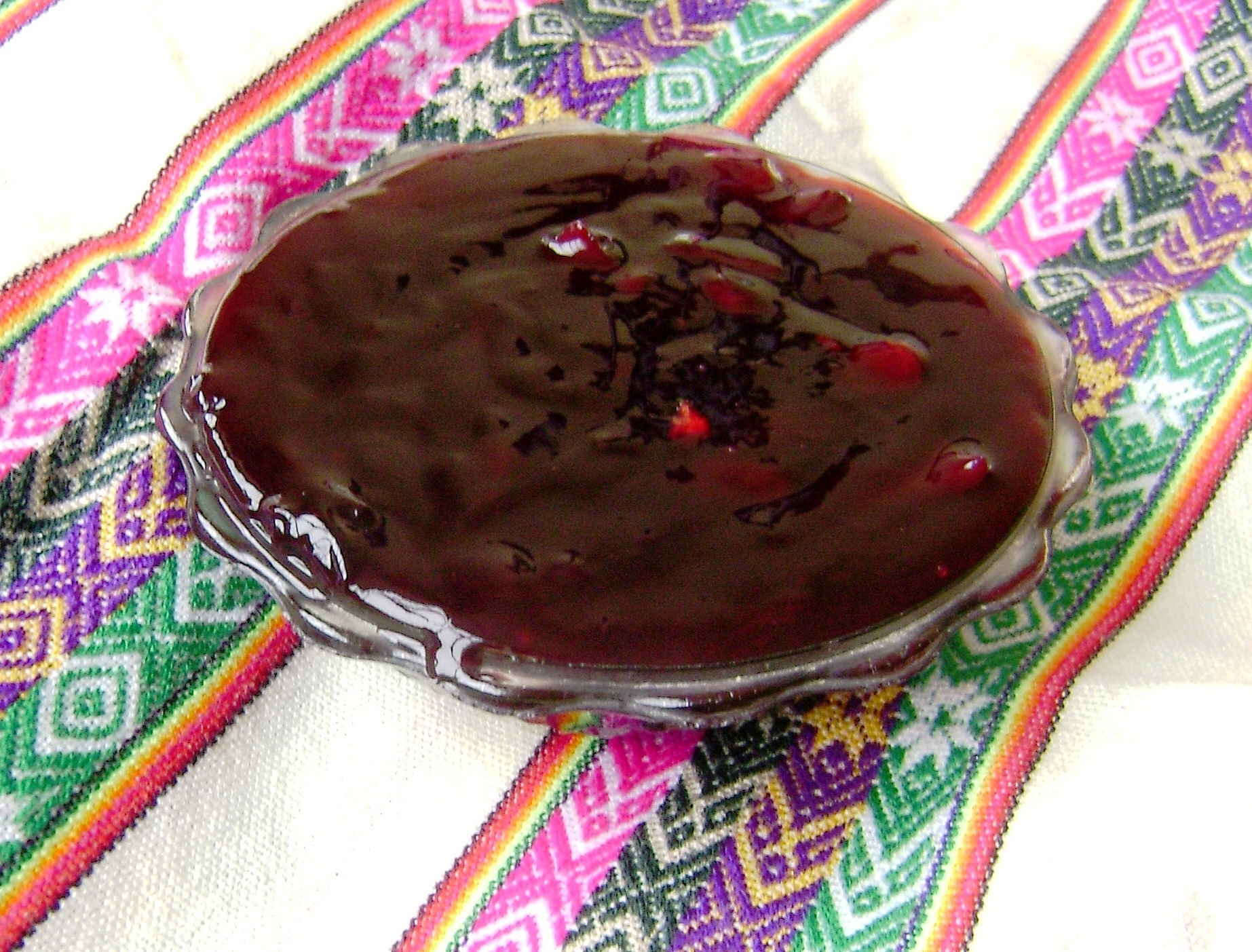
Peruvian purple mazamorra

Purple mazamorra in Peru is made with a local variety of maize, purple corn, rich in anthocyanin which gives the mazamorra a deep purple color. The maize is cooked with pineapple, cinnamon and sweet potato flour. This dish is made specially in October for the celebrations of the Lord of Miracles day 333. This purple corn is also used to make chicha morada, a sweet beverage. Other types of Peruvian mazamorras include maize starch mazamorra (mazamorra de maicena), and dark brown sugar mazamorra (mazamorra de cochino).

=== Uruguay ===
Mazamorra has been consumed since colonial times, made from crushed maize. Mazamorra con leche is a traditional dessert, made of crumbled maize, sugar and milk, and was commonly sold as street food in ancient Montevideo but nowadays is more like an old-fashioned comfort food.

It is also a type of cazuela, using maize for mazamorra and other ingredients such as butter beans, carrots, pork meat or other kinds of meat in tiny slices; it is typically a winter meal.

=== Costa Rica ===
Costa Rican mazamorra is basically a corn porridge, which is made cooking the maize in milk, clove, vanilla, and adding corn starch.

=== Puerto Rico ===
Puerto Rican mazamorra is fresh corn custard. Corn kernels are cut off the cob and boiled with milk and cob until the corn softens. Once soft, the cob is discarded and the corn is put into a blender with the milk. Once made into a paste, the corn is passed through a chinois back into the pot for a second time. The liquid is then cooked with corn starch, butter, coconut cream, evaporated milk, ginger, spices, zest, and sugar. It is then topped with powdered nutmeg and cinnamon. Banana or ripe breadfruit can be blended and added for texture and flavor.

== Other variations ==
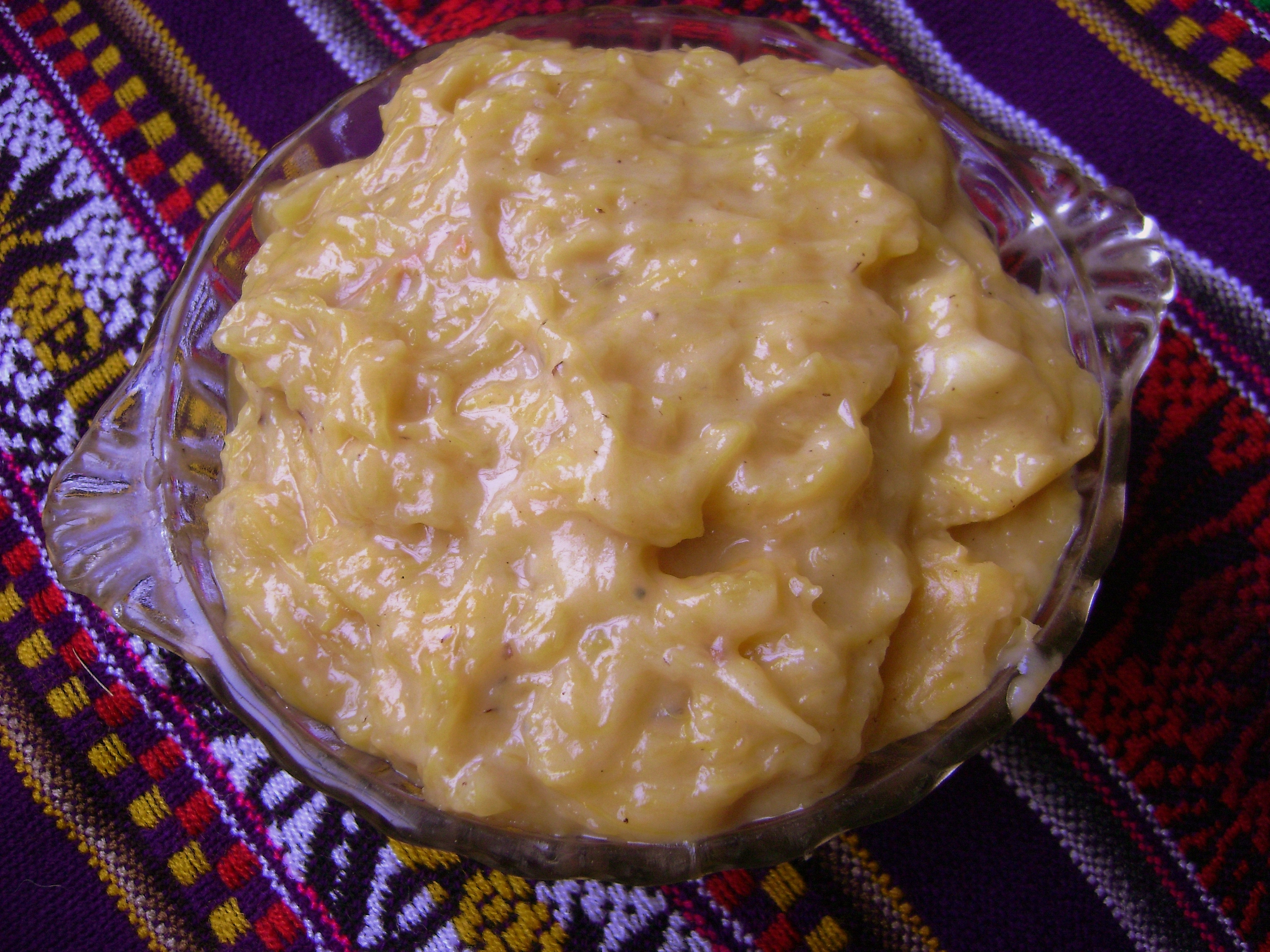
Pumpkin mazamorra

=== Panama ===
A local dessert made with the nance fruit (also known as pesada 'heavy').

=== Peru ===
Mazamorra de calabaza is a popular dessert in the Huánuco region, made with pumpkin.

=== Dominican Republic ===
Mazamorra means 'mashed squash'.

== See also ==
- Mote (food)
- Atole
- Champurrado
- Corn stew
- Api (beverage)
- Colada morrada
- List of maize dishes
- List of porridges
