= Creamed corn =

American corn dish with thick, soupy consistency

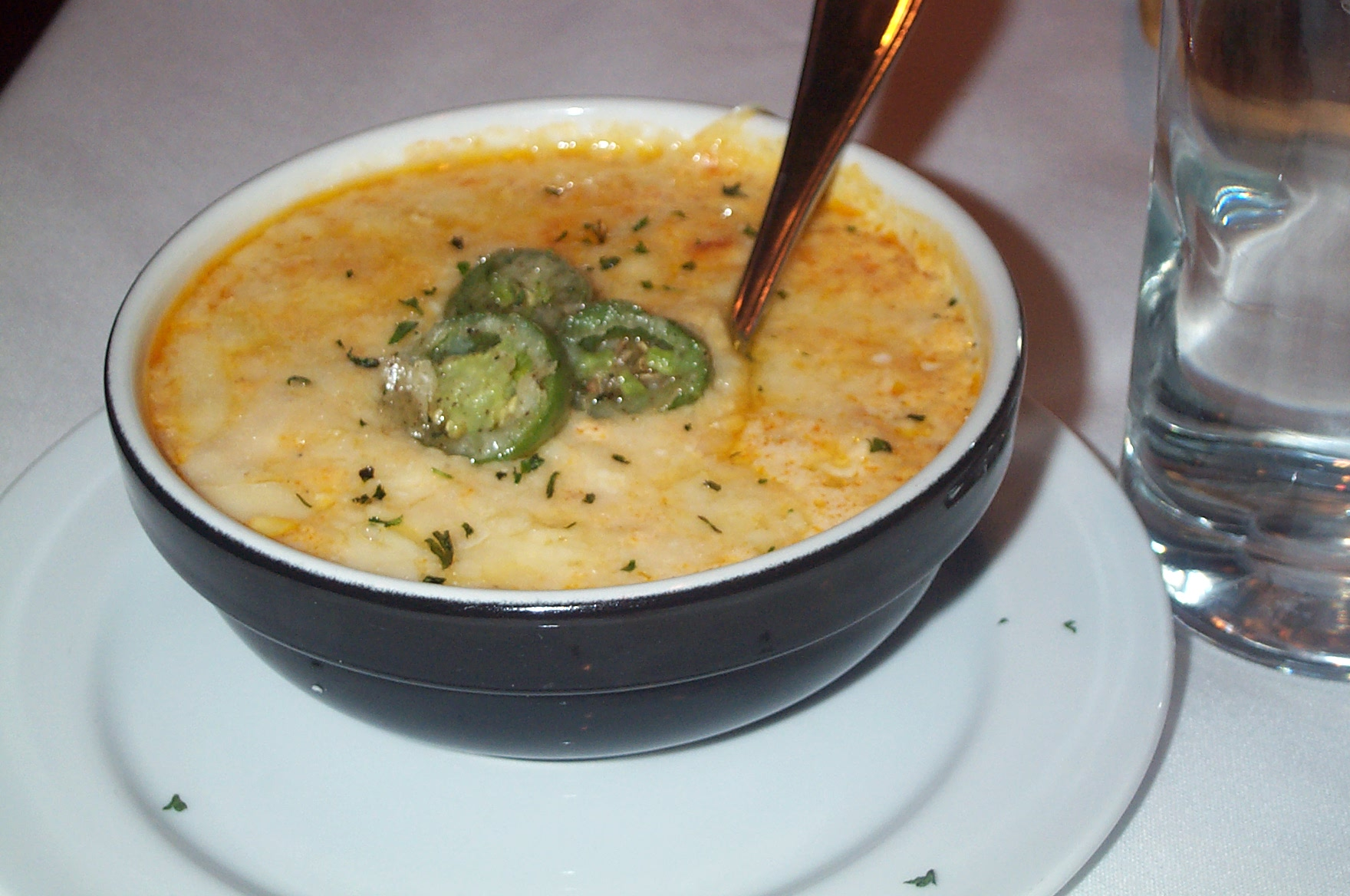
- A bowl of creamed corn
- Alternative names: Soup corn
- Type: Creamed food
- Place of origin: United States
- Main ingredients: Sweetcorn

Creamed corn (which is also known by other names, such as cream-style sweet corn) is a type of creamed vegetable dish made by combining pieces of whole sweetcorn with a soupy liquid of milky residue from immature pulped corn kernels scraped from the cob. Originating in Native American cuisine, it is now most commonly eaten in the Midwestern and Southern United States, as well as being used in the French Canadian dish pâté chinois ('Chinese pie': a dish like shepherd's pie). It is a soupy version of sweetcorn, and unlike other preparations of sweetcorn, creamed corn is partially puréed, releasing the liquid contents of the kernels.

== Additional ingredients ==
Canned creamed corn does not usually contain any cream, but some homemade versions may include milk or cream. Sugar and starch may also be added. Commercial, store-bought canned preparations may contain tapioca starch as a thickener.

== Gallery ==
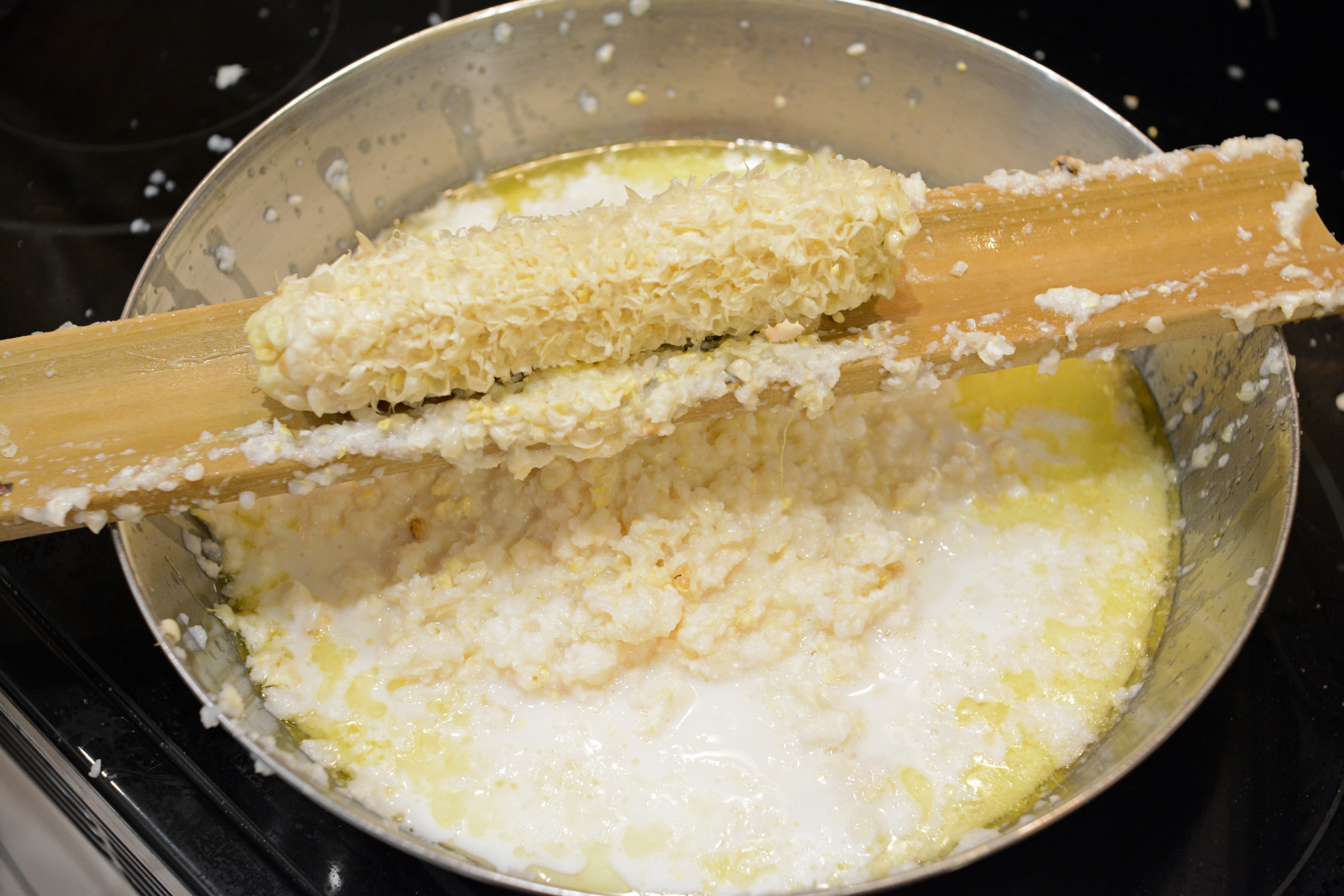
The corn is scraped off the cob into a cooking pan

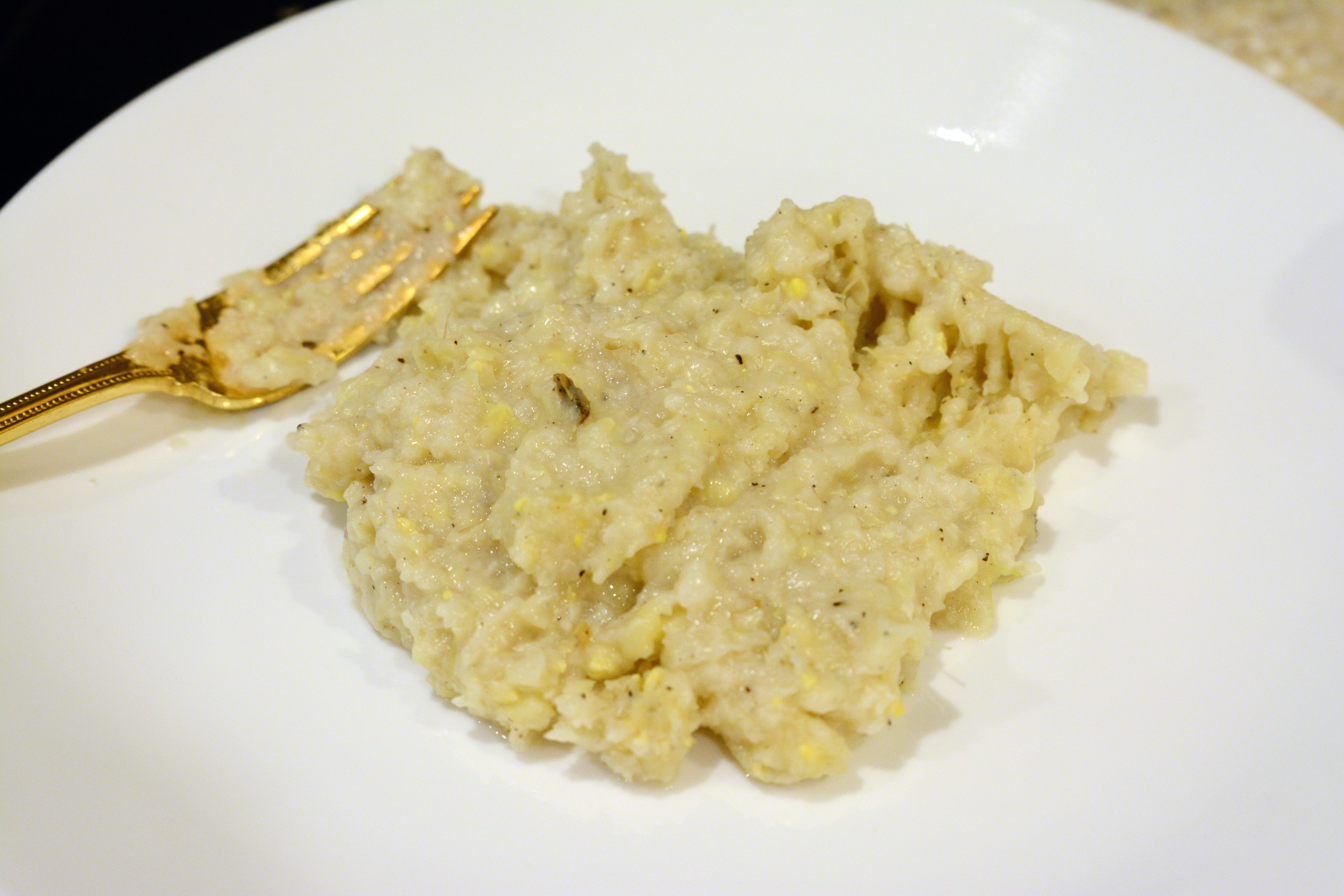
Creamed corn, plated

== See also ==
- Corn soup
- Corn stew
- Corn chowder
- Cream soup
- Grits
- List of maize dishes
- List of soups
- Creamed spinach
