= Cajamarca (disambiguation) =

Cajamarca may refer to:

Colombia

- Cajamarca, Tolima a town and municipality in Tolima Department

Peru

- Cajamarca, city in Peru
- Cajamarca District, district in the Cajamarca province
- Cajamarca Province, province in the Cajamarca region
- Cajamarca Region, region in Peru

It may also refer to

- Cajamarca Quechua, a language of Peru
