= Corn crab soup =

Chinese soup of corn and crab meat

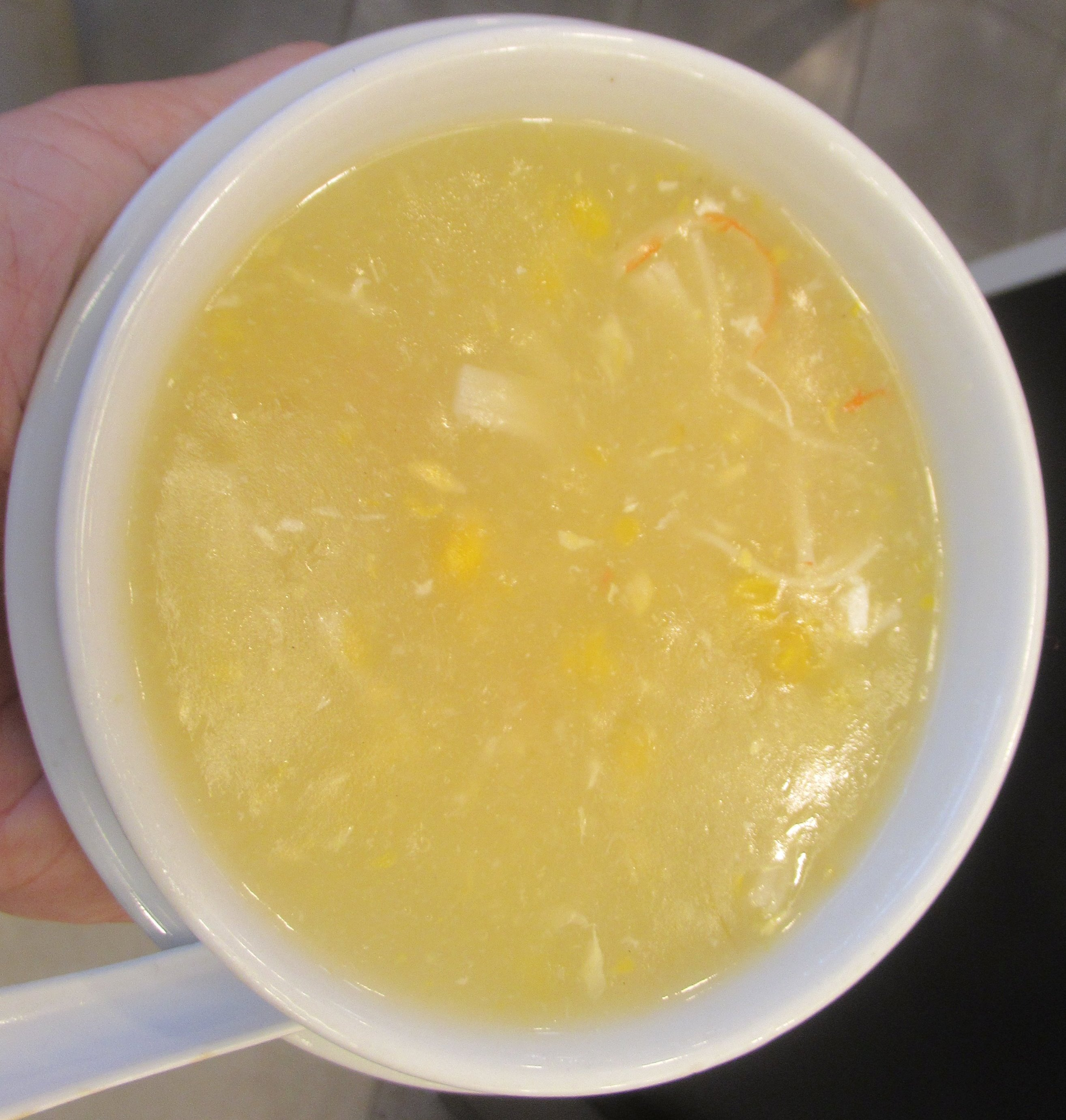
- Type: Soup
- Place of origin: China
- Main ingredients: Corn, egg whites, crab meat or imitation crab meat

Corn crab soup
- Traditional Chinese: 1. 蟹肉玉米湯; 2. 蟹肉粟米羹; 3. 蟹肉玉米羹; 4. 玉米蟹肉湯; 5. 粟米蟹肉羹; 6. 玉米蟹肉羹
- Simplified Chinese: 1. 蟹肉玉米汤; 2. 蟹肉粟米羹; 3. 蟹肉玉米羹; 4. 玉米蟹肉汤; 5. 粟米蟹肉羹; 6. 玉米蟹肉羹
Transcriptions
Standard Mandarin
- Hanyu Pinyin: 1. xièròu yùmǐ tāng 2. xièròu sùmǐ tāng 3. xie4ròu yùmǐ gēng 4. yùmǐ xièròu tāng 5. sùmǐ xièròu gēng 6. yùmǐ xièròu gēng
Yue: Cantonese
- Jyutping: 1. haai5 juk6 juk6 mai5 tong1 2. haai5 juk6 suk1 mai5 tong1 3. haai5 juk6 juk6 mai5 gang1 4. juk6 mai4 haai5 juk6 tong1 5. suk1 mai5 haai5 juk6 gang1 6. juk6 mai5 haai5 juk6 gang1

Corn crab soup is a dish found in Chinese cuisine, American Chinese cuisine, and Canadian Chinese cuisine. The soup is similar to cream of corn soup with egg white and crab meat or imitation crab meat added.

== Regional ==
This soup is found in Chinese restaurants across mainland China, Hong Kong, Taiwan, and some Southeast Asian nations such as Singapore, Malaysia, Indonesia, the Philippines, Thailand, and Vietnam. It is particularly popular in Hakka-speaking regions of southern China and Taiwan. It is also popular in Chinese takeout restaurants in the United States, Canada, Europe, and Japan. In the Philippines it is called sopang mais.

The soup may be derived from tofu-crab soup, a soup also found in restaurants in North America.

== See also ==
- Egg drop soup
- List of Chinese soups
- List of crab dishes
- List of maize dishes
- List of seafood dishes
- List of soups
