= Mămăligă în pături =

Romanian layered dish

Mămăligă în pături (layered mămăligă, literally "mămăligă in blankets") is a traditional dish from the Maramureș region, in the north of Romania. The dish is made up of many layers of mămăligă alternating with layers of sour cream (smântână), butter, cheese and eggs like a mille-feuille.

== See also ==
- Bulz
- Cocoloşi
- List of maize dishes
- Tochitură
