= Tocană =

Romanian stew

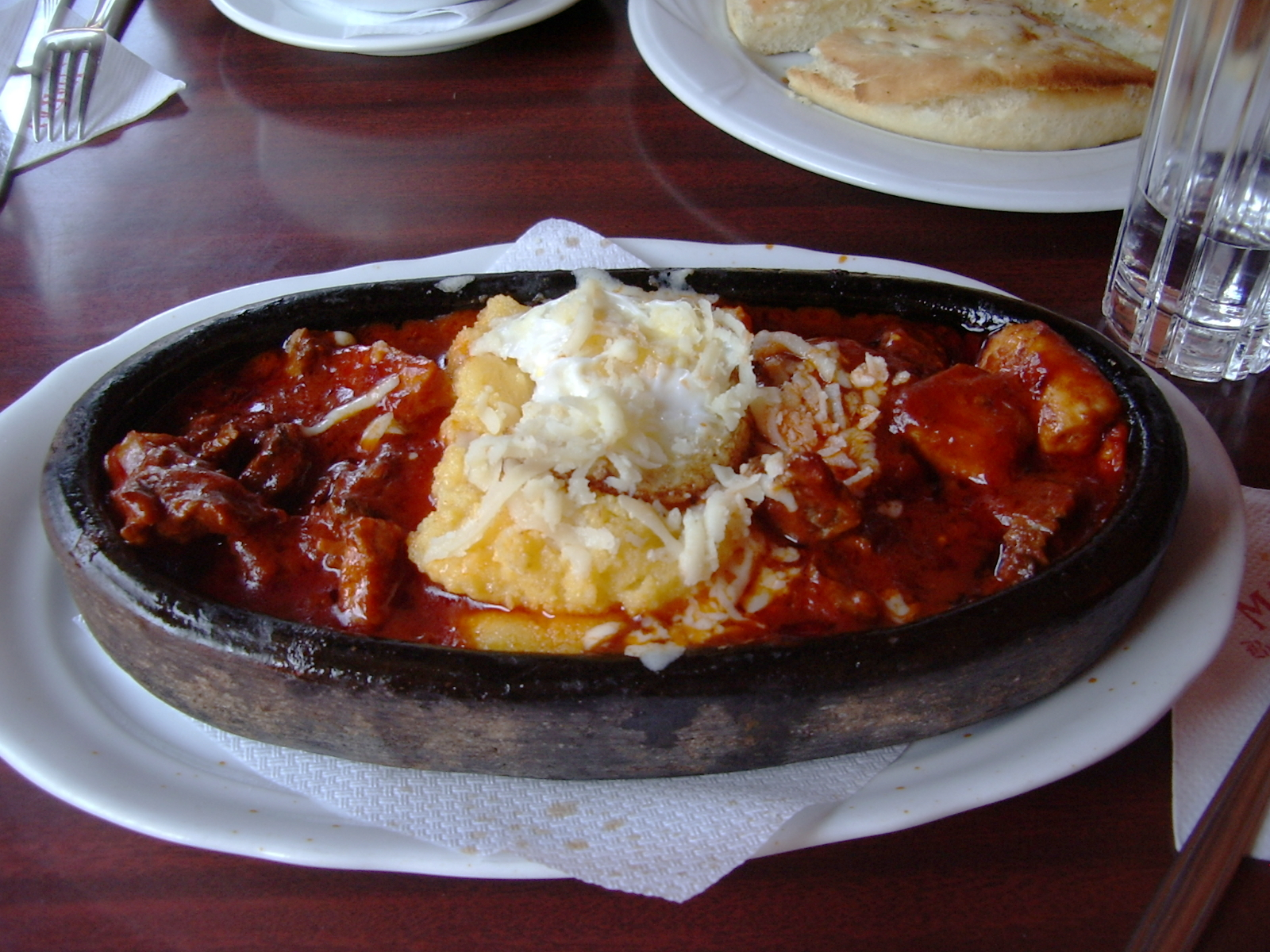
Tocană with mămăligă

Tocană, also known as tocăniță, is a Romanian stew prepared with tomato, garlic and sweet paprika. Traditionally, it is consumed with a cornmeal mush named mămăligă. Derived from the Latin "toccare" into the modern "toca", the term is sometimes rendered as "tokana" in English.

While the Hungarian dish tokány shares a linguistic connection with the Romanian tocană, tokány reflects Turkic/broader Eurasian Steppe culinary tradition. A dish in the style of the Hungarian tokány is believed to have been prepared by shepherds in Transylvania since the arrival of the Hungarian tribes.

== Variations ==
Variations include the inclusion of mushrooms in the stew's preparation. Additional variations include the addition or use of meat, such as lamb, and potatoes.

== See also ==
- List of stews
- Tochitură
- Tokány
