= Bulz (food) =

Romanian dish of roasted polenta and cheese

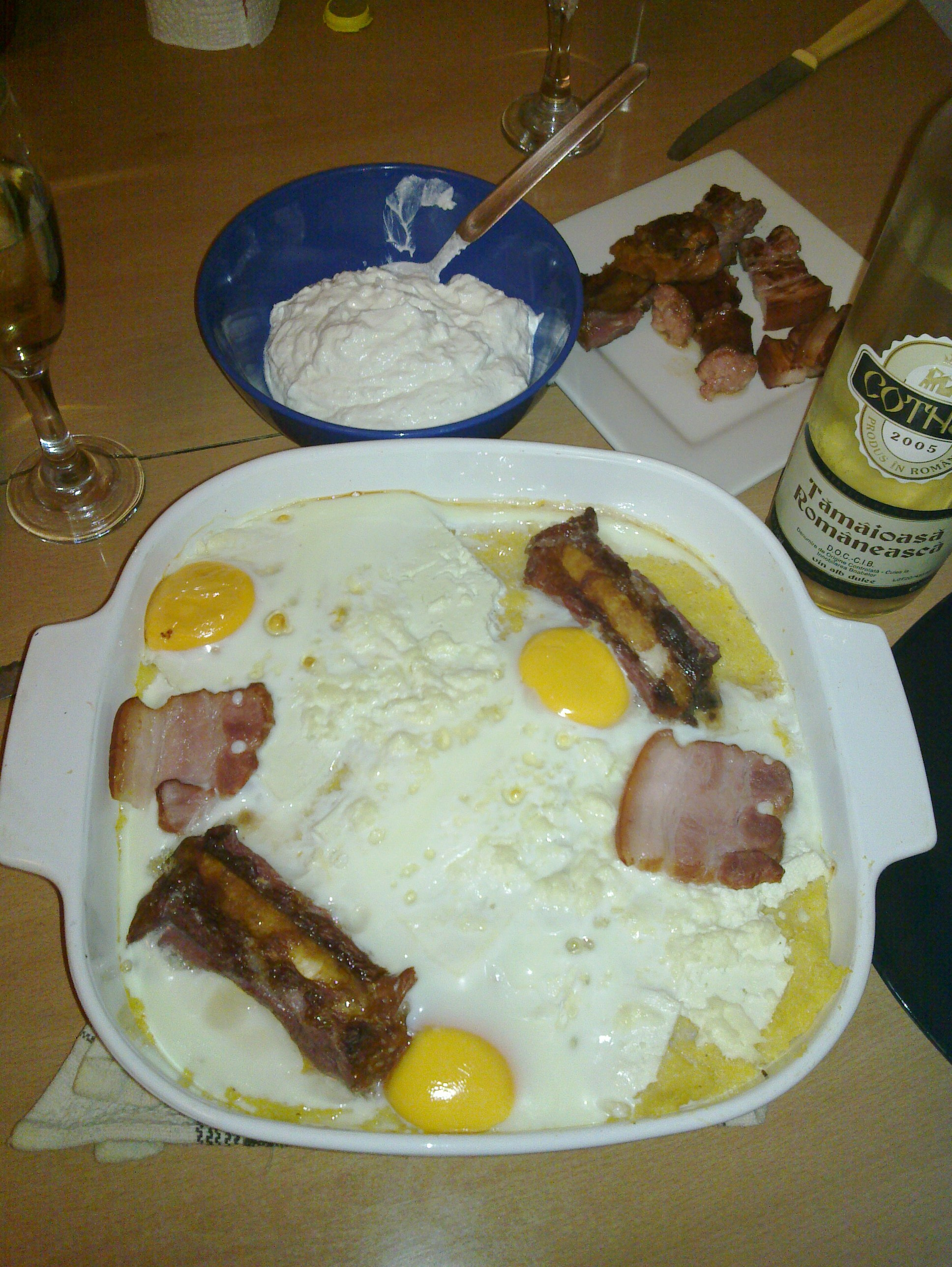
A plate of bulz with eggs and bacon

Bulz, also called urs de mămăligă (lit. "polenta bear"), is a Romanian dish prepared by roasting polenta (mămăligă) and cheese in an oven. Bulz is often eaten with sour cream.

In June 2010, the town of Covasna established the record of the biggest bulz of the world with a length of 50 metres (160 feet). This record was recognized by Guinness World Records.

== Serving examples ==
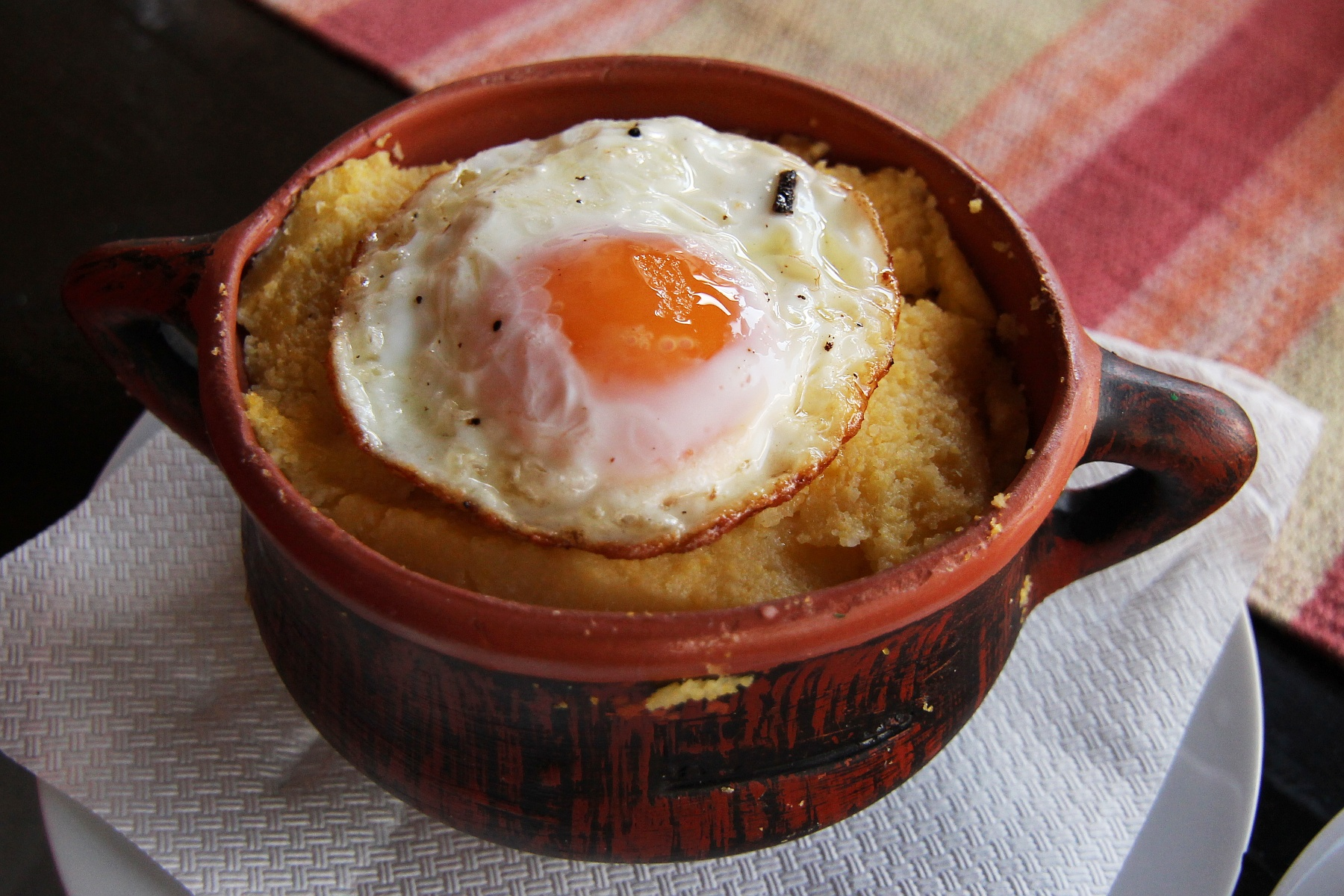
Bulz with egg

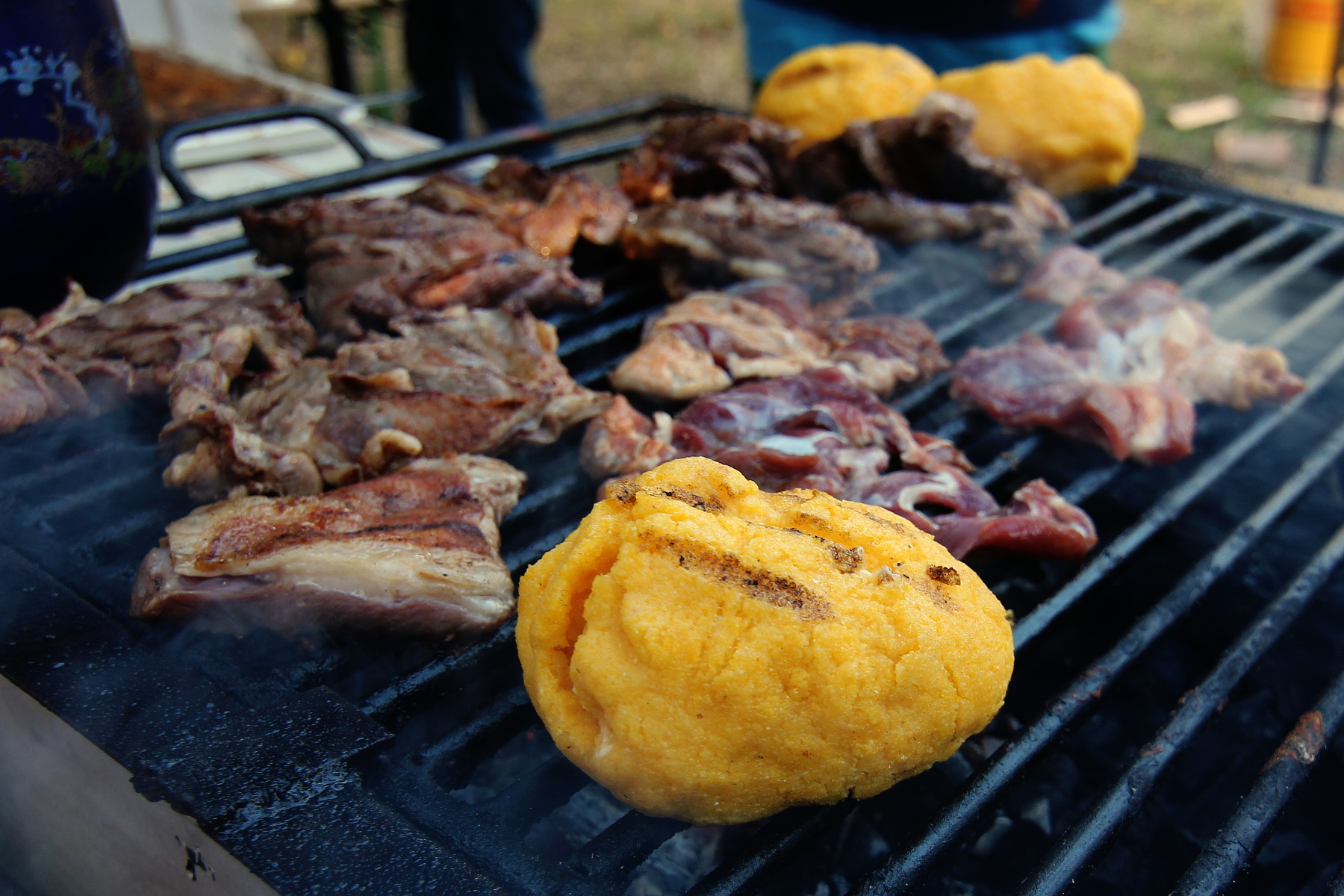
Bulz and pastramă on a grill

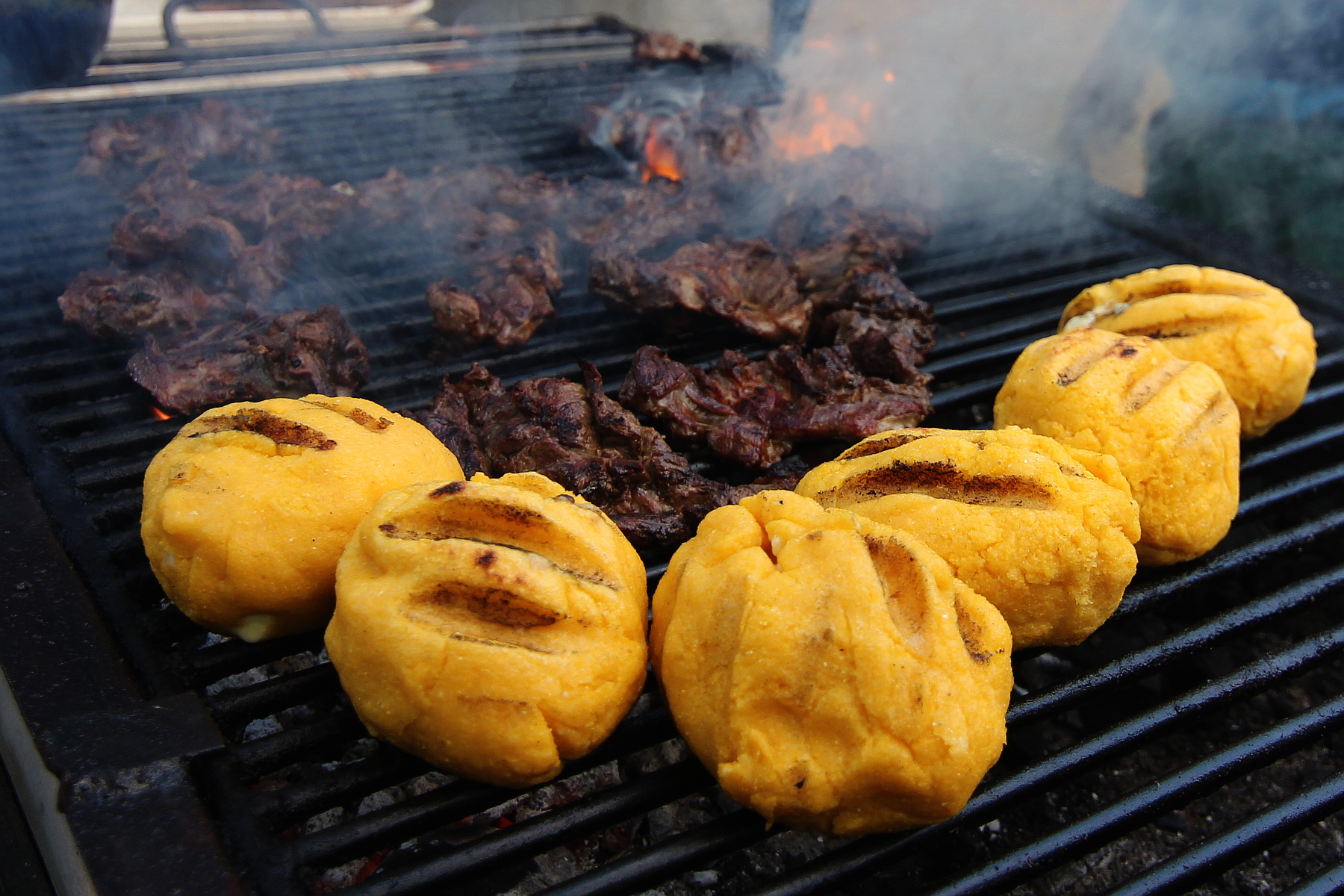
Bulz and pastramă on a grill

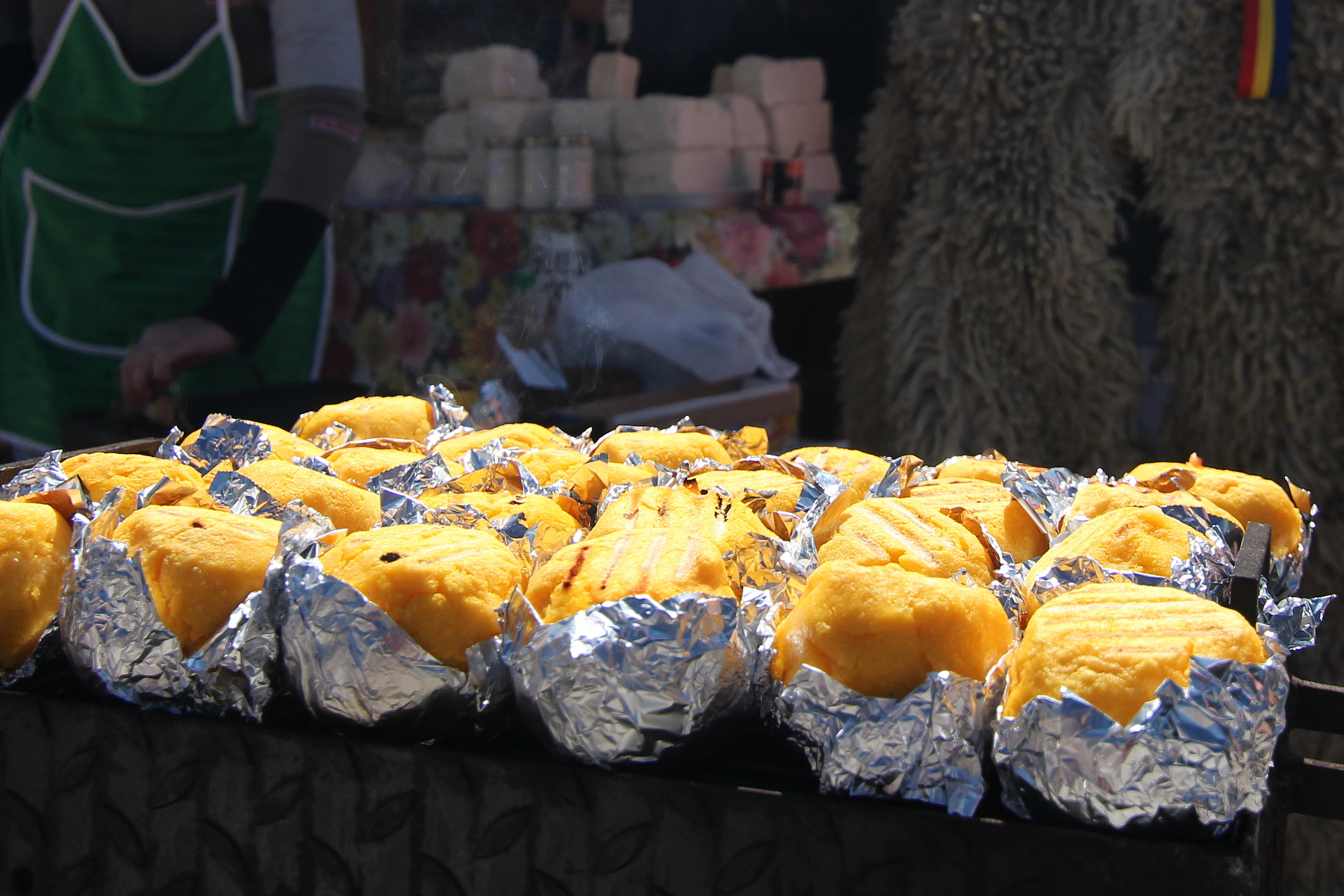
Shepherd's bulz

== See also ==
- Cocoloşi
- Mămăligă în pături
- List of maize dishes
