= Cocoloși =

Romanian dish of grilled corn porridge

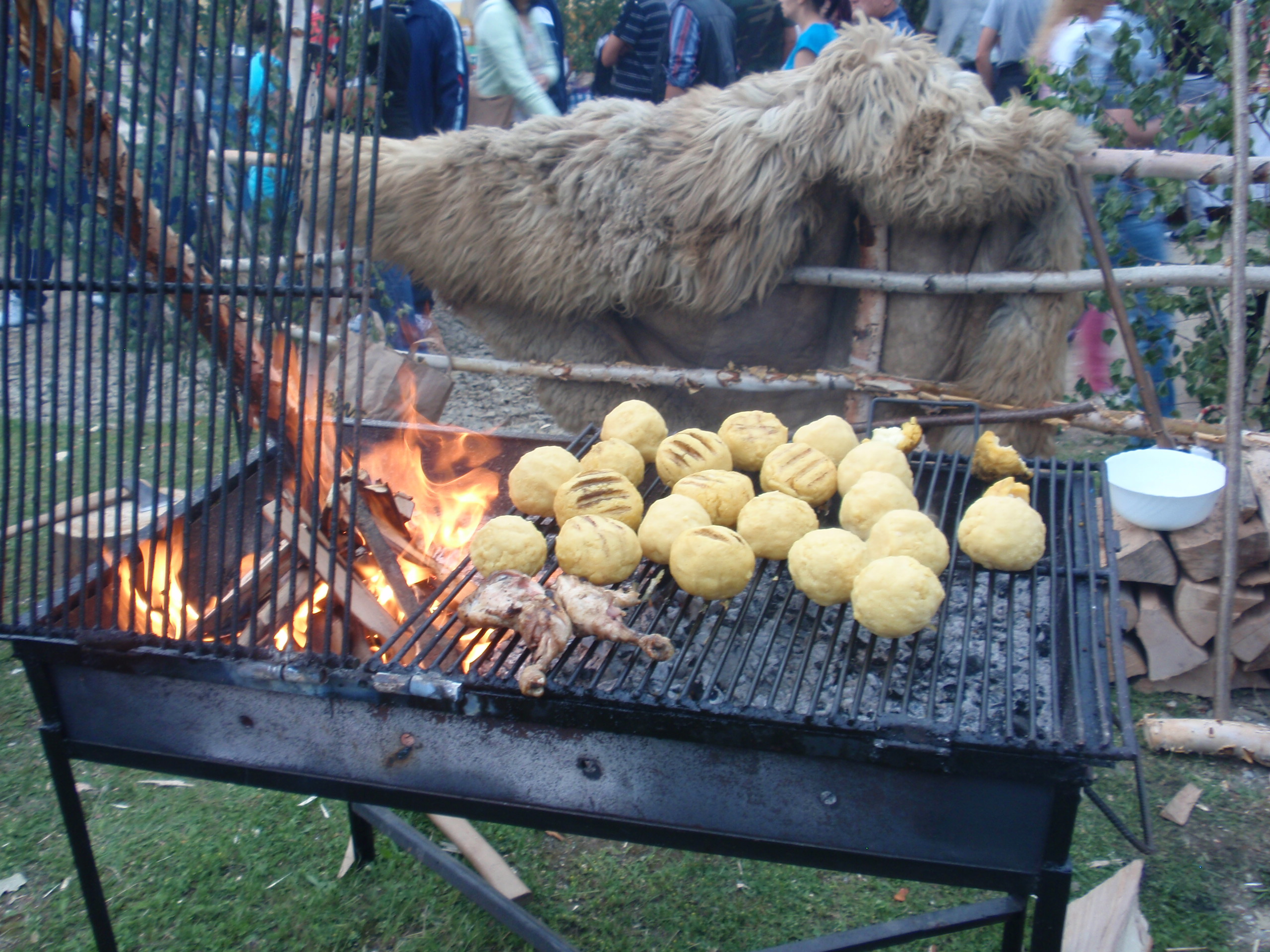
- Cocoloși cooking on a grill
- Place of origin: Romania
- Main ingredients: Cheese, mămăligă

Cocoloși is a traditional Romanian dish, consisting of balls of mămăligă (a porridge made out of yellow maize flour) filled with cheese and grilled on a barbecue.

== See also ==
- Bulz (food)
- Mămăligă în pături
- List of maize dishes
