= Kačamak =

Maize porridge from the Balkans

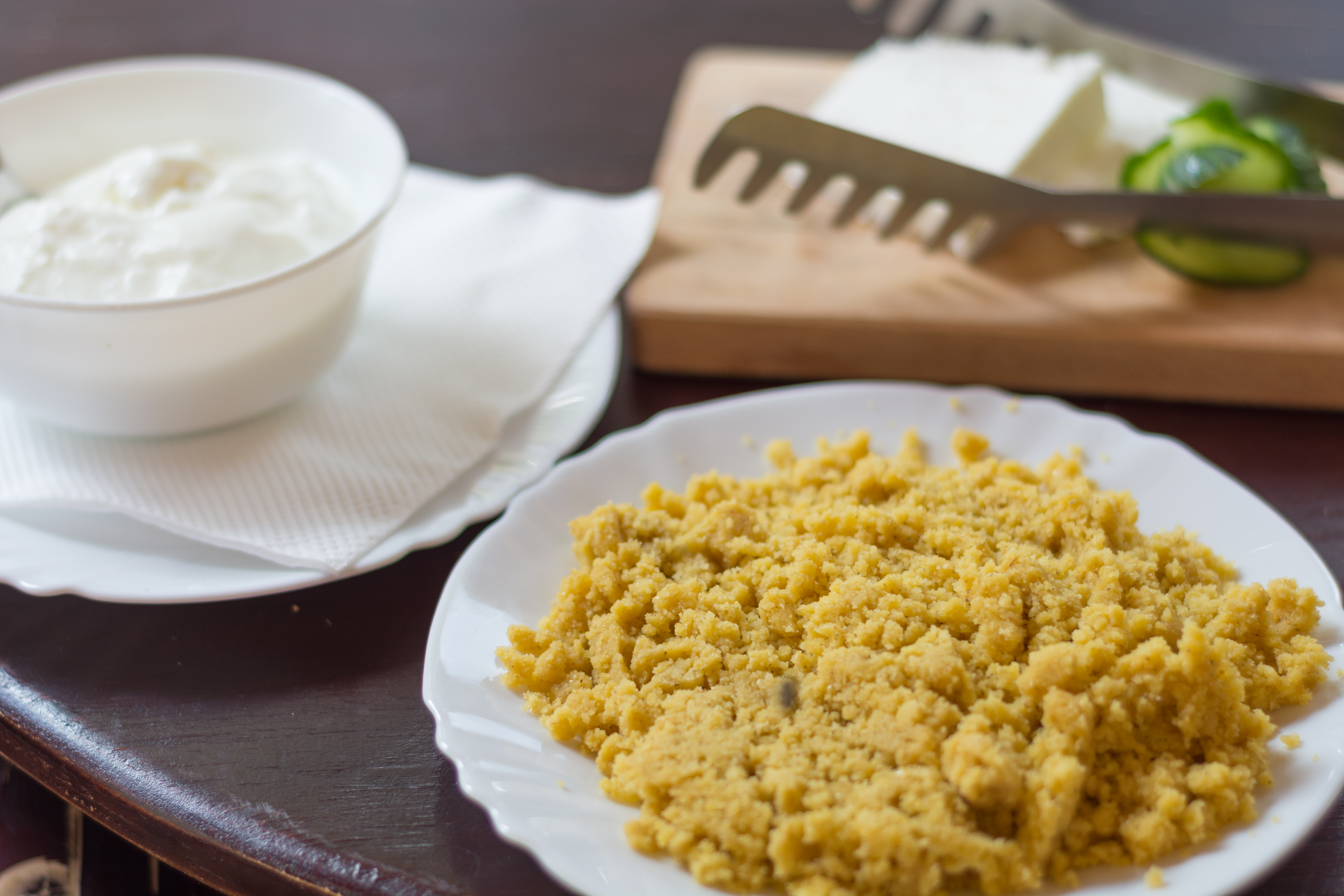
- Alternative names: Kachamak
- Type: Pudding
- Place of origin: Balkans
- Region or state: Balkans
- Main ingredients: Cornmeal

Kačamak is a kind of maize porridge made in parts of Western Asia and Southeastern Europe. Its name is derived from the Turkish word kaçamak, meaning 'escapade'.

== History ==
The dish is made of cornmeal. Potatoes, milk, white cheese, or kaymak are sometimes added. Similar to the Abkhazian abısta, Adyghe mamıs, Italian polenta and Romanian mămăligă, it is prepared by boiling cornmeal and then mashing it while the pot is still on the stove. It was once regarded as a poor man's food, but now is widely eaten, including in restaurants.

== Serving ==
In Bulgaria, kačamak is traditionally served with heated lard or sunflower oil with small amounts of browned paprika or hot pepper. Often cracklings or sirene are added.

In Montenegro, Albania, and Bosnia and Herzegovina, kačamak is also prepared with crushed potatoes and cheese until a thick mass is formed.

In Central Serbia, kačamak is prepared with finer grains of white cornmeal, served with white cheese and kajmak. It is usually served with minced meat roasted in butter, boiled grape juice, milk, plain yogurt, honey, sour cream, or sometimes with bacon.

== Gallery ==
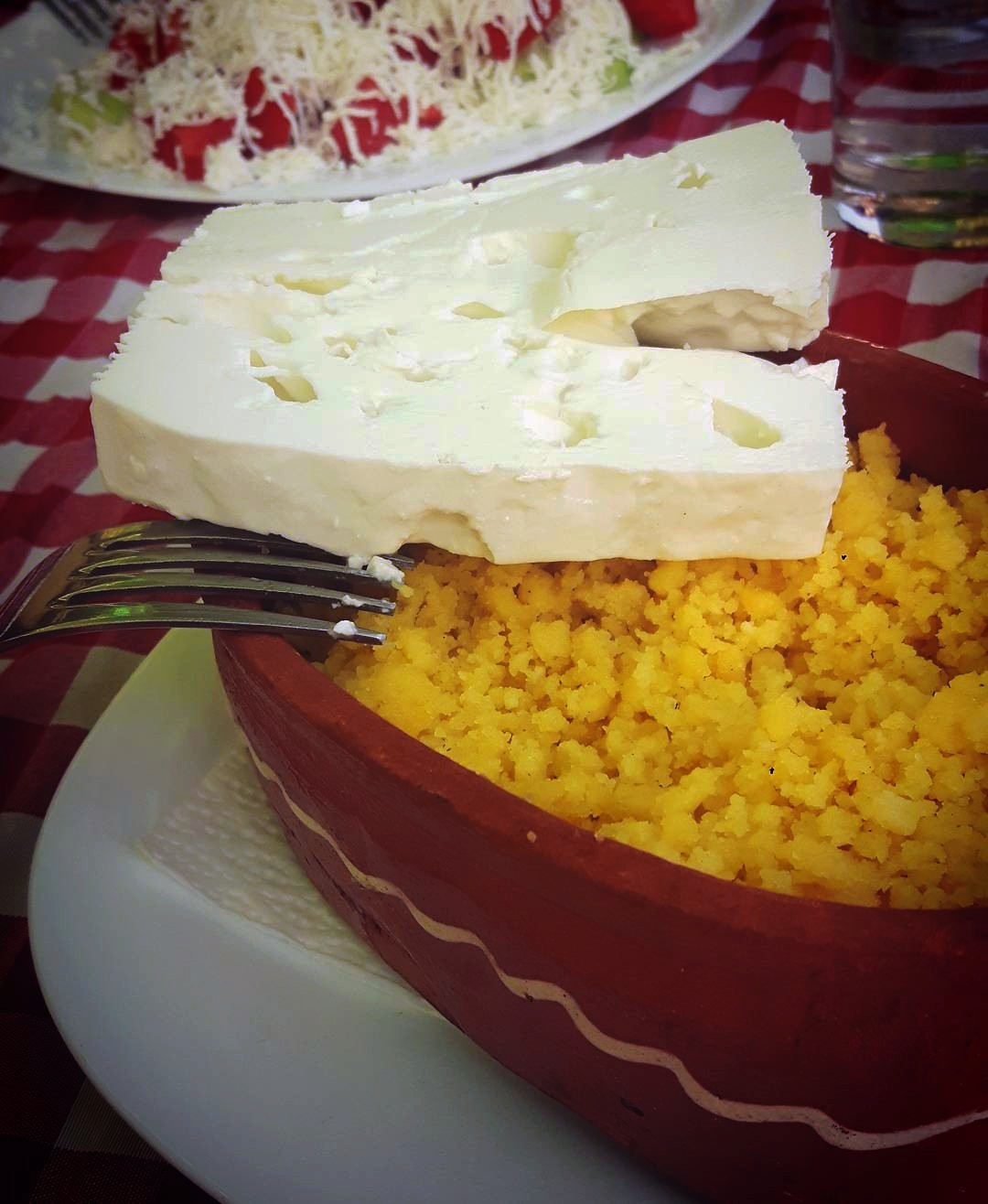
Kačamak with cheese

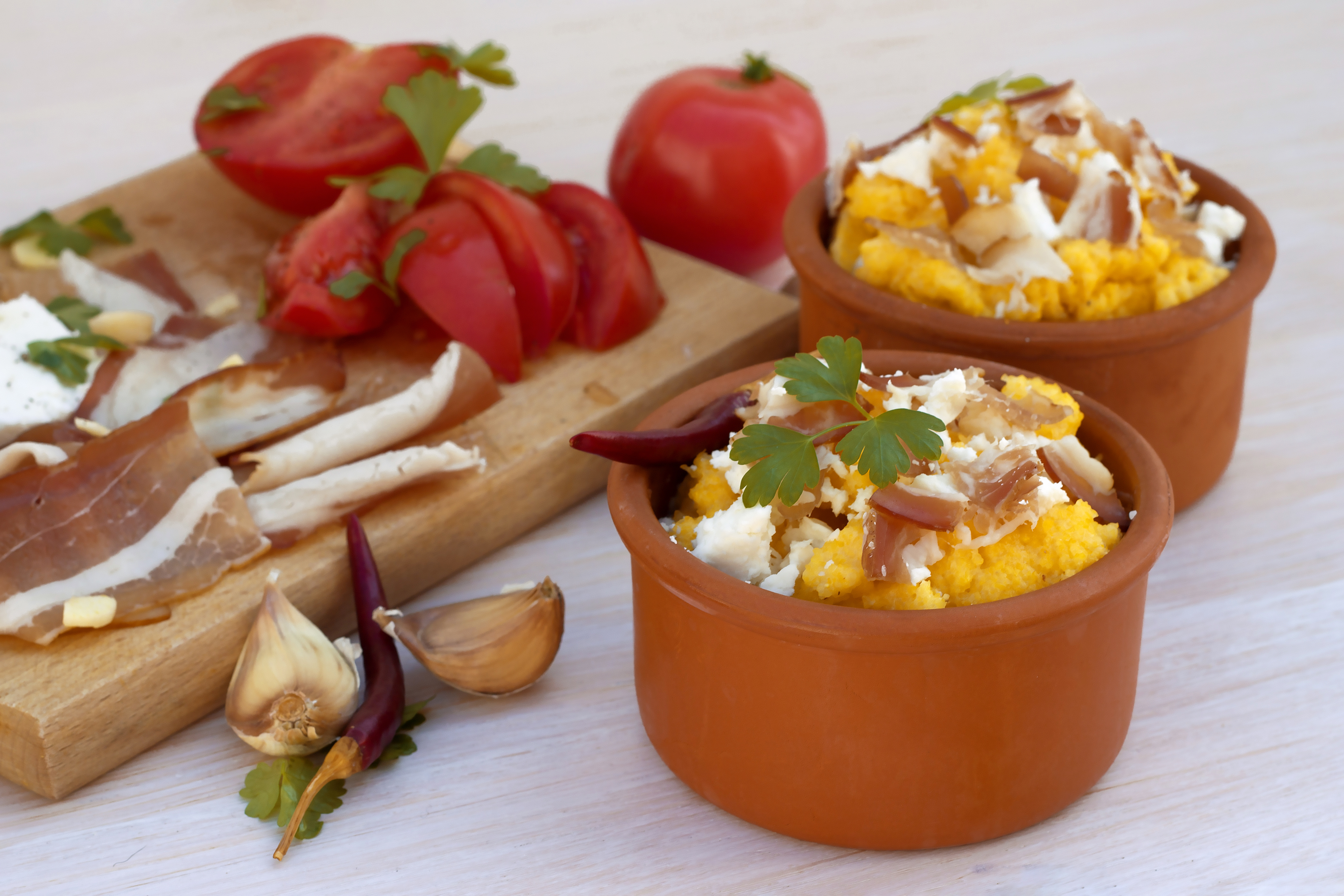
Kačamak served with cheese and bacon
