= Mămăligă =

Traditional dish from yellow maize flour

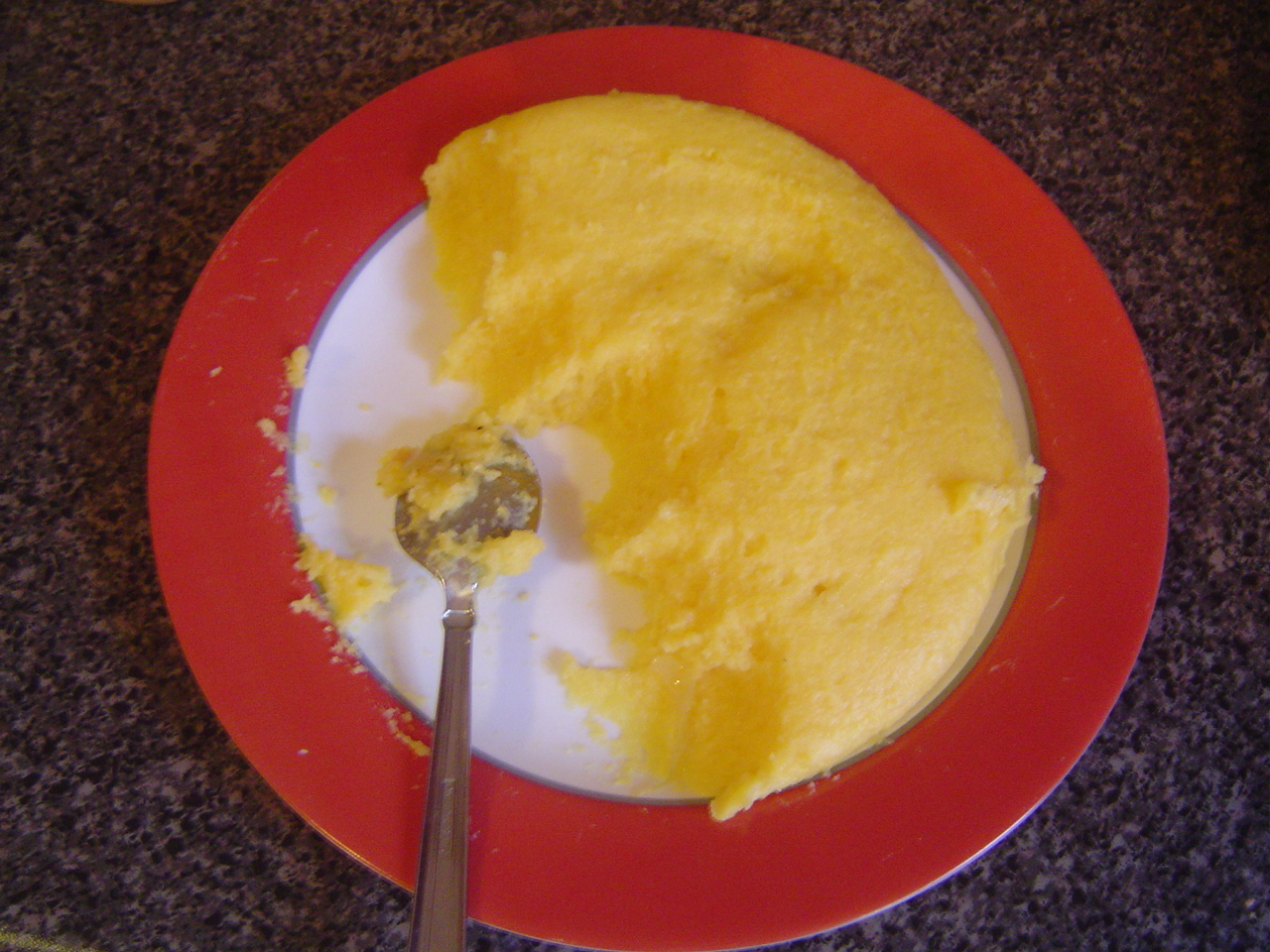
- Course: Main course
- Place of origin: Romania
- Region or state: Romania, Moldova, Hungary, Ukraine
- Main ingredients: boiling water; salt; cornmeal
- Ingredients generally used: grits
- Food energy (per 100 g serving): 70 kcal (290 kJ)
Nutritional value
(per 100 g serving)
- Protein: 2 g
- Fat: 0 g
- Carbohydrate: 15 g
- Similar dishes: polenta; puliszka; žganci; kulesha; kačamak

Mămăligă (Romanian pronunciation: [məməˈliɡə];) is a dish made out of yellow maize flour, traditional in Romania, Moldova, Hungary (puliszka, mamaliga or málé), and Ukraine (kulesha or mamałyga). On the Balkan Peninsula, the dish is known as kačamak.

It is similar to Georgian ghomi (alternatively called mamaliga) and Italian polenta.

== History ==
Maize was consumed by Romani slaves in Wallachia and Moldavia, as well as Muslim slaves, who were prisoners of war.

=== Roman influence ===
Before the introduction of maize in Europe in the 16th century A.D., mămăligă had been made with millet flour, known to the Romans as pulmentum.

=== Corn's introduction in the Romanian lands ===
Maize was introduced into Spain by Hernán Cortés from Mexico in 1530 and spread in Europe in the 16th century. Maize (called corn in the United States) requires a good amount of heat and humidity. The Danube Valley is one of Europe's regions ideal for growing maize.

A Hungarian scholar documented the arrival of corn in Temesvár, Banat region, 1692. In Transylvania, maize is also called 'cucuruz', which could imply a connection between Transylvanian and Serbian merchants, kukuruz being a Slavic word. Some assume it was either Șerban Cantacuzino or Constantin Mavrocordat who introduced corn in Wallachia, Maria Theresa in Transylvania and Constantine Ducas in Moldavia where it is called păpușoi. Mămăligă of millet would have been replaced gradually by mămăligă made of corn. Corn then became an important food, especially in the fight against famine, which prevailed in the 17th and 18th centuries.

Historian Nicolae Iorga noted that farmers of the Romanian Principalities had grown corn since the early-to-mid-17th century.

Etienne Ignace Raicevich, a Ragusan consul of Napoleonic France to Bucharest in the fourth quarter of the 18th century, wrote that corn was introduced only da poco tempo (recently).

Before the arrival of maize in Eastern Europe, mămăligă was made of millet flour. Long lost, millet mămăligă is now again fashionable in western Europe.

== Preparation ==
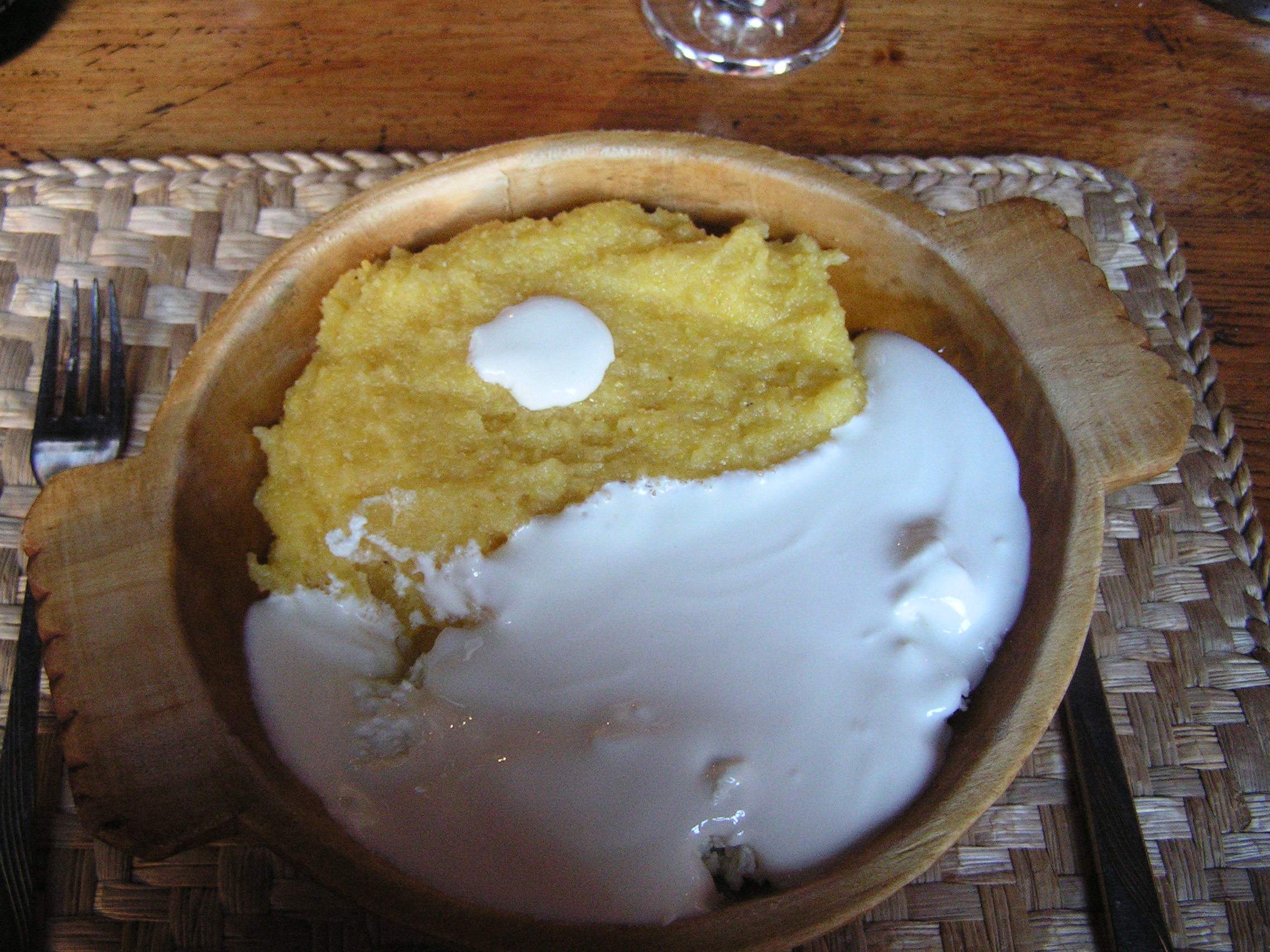
Mămăligă with sour cream and cheese

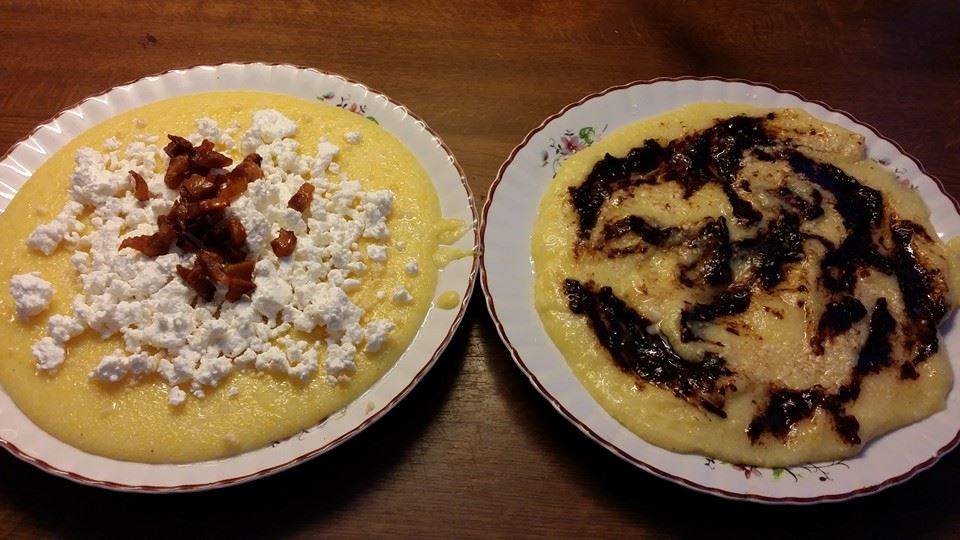
In Hungary puliszka is typically eaten with salo and tvorog (szalonna és túró) or with jam.

Traditionally, mămăligă is cooked by boiling water, salt and cornmeal in a special-shaped cast iron pot called ceaun or tuci. When cooked peasant-style and used as a bread substitute, mămăligă is supposed to be much thicker than the regular Italian polenta to the point that it can be cut in slices, like bread. When cooked for other purposes, mămăligă can be much softer, sometimes almost to the consistency of porridge. Because mămăligă sticks to metal surfaces, a piece of sewing thread is used to cut it into slices instead of a knife; it can then be eaten by holding it with the hand, just like bread.

Mămăligă is a versatile food: various recipes of mămăligă-based dishes may include milk, butter, various types of cheese, eggs, sausages (usually fried, grilled or oven-roasted), bacon, mushrooms, ham, fish etc.Depending on the recipe, Mămăligă can be a fat-free, cholesterol-free, high-fiber food. It can be used as a healthy alternative to more refined carbohydrates such as white bread, pasta, or hulled rice.

=== Serving mămăligă ===
Mămăligă is often served with sour cream and cheese on the side (mămăligă cu brânză și smântână) or crushed in a bowl of hot milk (mămăligă cu lapte). Sometimes slices of mămăligă are pan-fried in oil or in lard, the result being a sort of corn pone.

The traditional Moldavian meal is often served with meat, usually pork or fried fish, and mujdei, a garlic-and-oil sauce. Harder boiled mamaliga is traditionally cut with a string, so it would not stick on a knife.

=== Similar dishes ===
Since mămăligă can be used as an alternative for bread in many Romanian and Moldovan dishes, there are quite a few which are either based on mămăligă, or include it as an ingredient or side dish. Arguably, the most popular of them is sarmale (a type of cabbage roll/grapevine roll) with mămăligă.

Another very popular Romanian dish based on mămăligă is called bulz, and consists of mămăligă with cheese and butter and roasted in the oven.

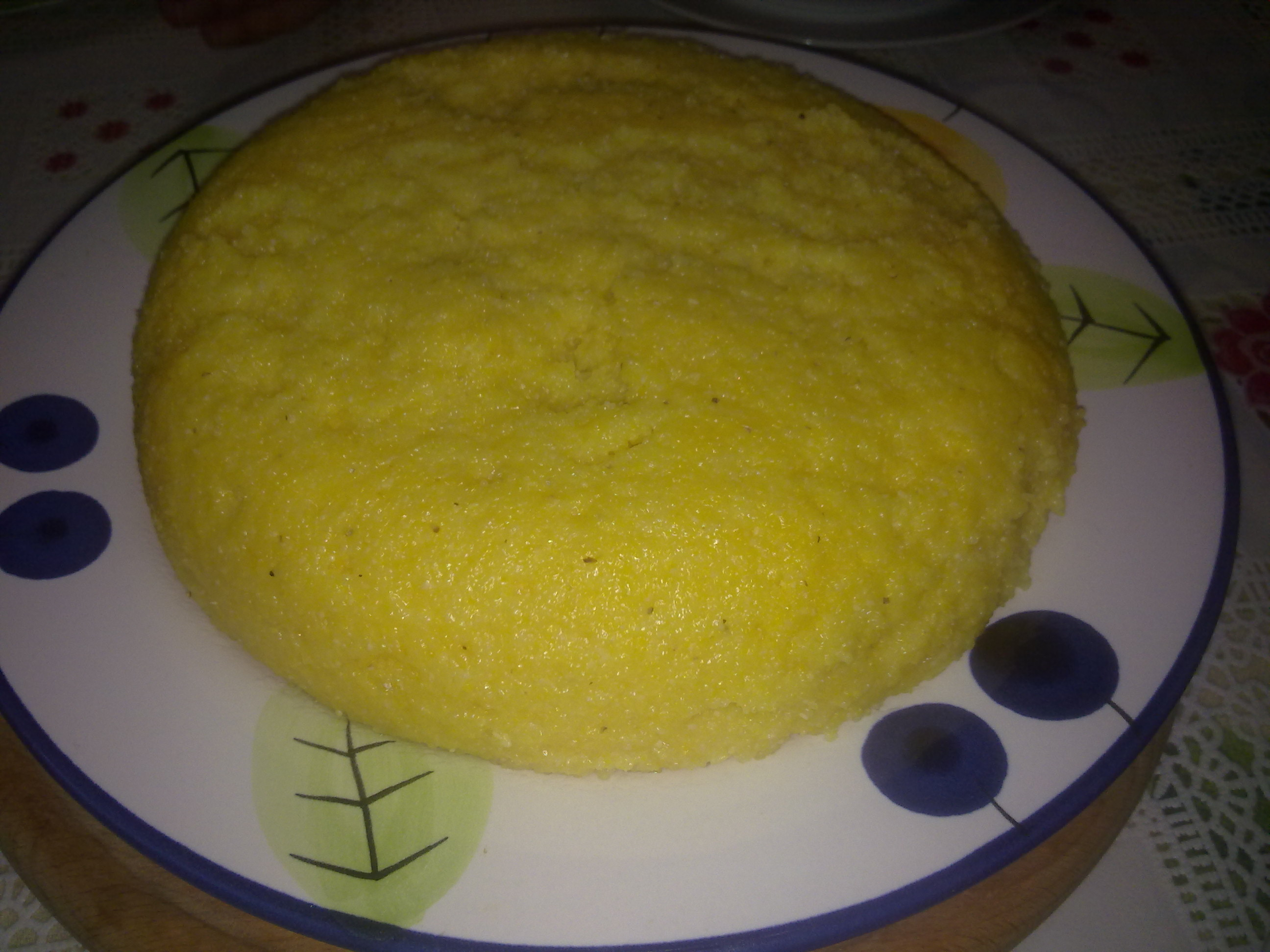
Mămăligă

Balmoș (sometimes spelled balmuș) is another mămăligă-like traditional Romanian dish, but is more elaborate. Unlike mămăligă (where the cornmeal is boiled in water) when making balmoș the cornmeal must be boiled in sheep milk. Other ingredients, such as butter, sour cream, telemea (a type of feta cheese), caș (a type of fresh curdled ewe cheese without whey, which is sometimes called "green cheese" in English), urdă (similar to ricotta), etc., are added to the mixture at certain times during the cooking process. It is a specialty dish of old Romanian shepherds, and nowadays very few people still know how to make a proper balmoș.

== In literature ==
In Chapter One of Dracula by Bram Stoker, the character Jonathan Harker writes, "I had for breakfast more paprika, and a sort of porridge of maize flour which they said was 'mamaliga', and egg-plant stuffed with forcemeat, a very excellent dish, which they call 'impletata'".

As a traditional Szekler food, it also appears in Hungarian folktales multiple times, for example in Szép Palkó.

== Similar dishes ==
Cornmeal mush is its analogue common in some regions of the United States and grits in the southern regions.

Its analogue in Serbia and Bulgaria is called kačamak (Serbian: качамак/kačamak, Bulgarian: качамак) and is served mainly with white brine cheese or pork rind (fried pieces of pork fat with parts of the skin).

In Bosnia and Herzegovina, Croatia (also polenta or palenta), Serbia (also kačamak) and in Montenegro, there is dish called pura. In North Macedonia, there is a similar dish called bakrdan (Macedonian: бакрдан).

The Transylvanian Saxons eat a food called 'palukes' in their traditional cuisine.

In Turkey, it is also called mamaliga, or kaçamak. Another similar dish, called kuymak or muhlama, is among the typical dishes of the Black Sea Region, although now popular in all the greater cities where there are many regional restaurants.

Similar dishes exist under different names in various local languages (Abkhaz: абысҭа, romanized: abysta, Adyghe: мамрыс, romanized: mamrys, Georgian: ღომი, Ingush: журан-худар, romanized: zhuran-khudar, Chechen: ah'ar-hudar, zhuran-hudar, Nogai: мамырза, romanized: mamırza, Iron Ossetic: сир, сорсерæ, romanized: sir, sorsera), as well as in Caucasian cuisines.

There is also a distinct similarity to cou-cou (as it is known in the Barbados), or fungi (as it is known in Antigua and Barbuda and other Leeward Islands in the Caribbean Sea).

A similar dish is eaten widely across Africa, often with white maize flour instead of yellow, where it has different local names:

- Akamu – Igbo, Nigeria
- Arega – Kenya, Luo
- Bando – Soga, Uganda
- Bidia – DR Congo
- Bogobe/Phaletšhe – Botswana, South Africa
- Bugali – Burundi, DR Congo, Sudan, South Sudan Rwanda
- Buhobe – Lozi
- Buru – Kenya, Luo
- Busima-Bagisu, Uganda
- Chenge – Kenya, Luo
- Chima – Mozambique
- Couscous de Cameroon – Cameroon
- Dona
- Fitah - Sudan, South Sudan, Congo
- Fufu - Sierra Leone
- Isitshwala – Botswana, Ndebele
- Kawunga - Ganda, Uganda
- Kimnyet – Kalenjin, Kenya
- Kuon – Kenya, Luo
- Kwen wunga - Alur, Uganda
- Lipalishi – Eswatini
- Mielie pap – Lesotho, South Africa
- Mogo – Kenya, Luo
- Moteke – DR Congo
- Mutuku – South Africa
- Nfundi – Congo
- Ngima – Kamba, Kenya, Kikuyu
- Nkima – Kenya, Meru
- Nshima- DR Congo Kasai region
- Nsima – Malawi, Zambia
- Obusuma – Kenya, Nyole
- Ogi – Nigeria, Yoruba
- Oshifima – Namibia
- Pap – Namibia, South Africa
- Papa – Lesotho, South Africa
- Phaletšhe – Botswana
- Phuthu – South Africa
- Posho – Uganda
- Poshto – Uganda
- Saab – Ghana, Kusasi
- Sadza – Shona and Kalanga, Zimbabwe and Botswana
- Sakora – Nigeria
- Sakoro – Ghana
- Sembe - Tanzania, slang
- Sembe – Kenya, slang
- Shadza – Kalanga, Botswana
- Shima
- Shishima - Zambia
- Sima – Chewa, Tumbuka, and Ngoni
- Soor – Somalia, Zambia
- Tuozafi (or T.Z.) – Ghana
- Ubugali – Rwanda
- Ubwali – Bemba
- Ugali – Kenya, Malawi, Mozambique, Tanzania, Uganda, Yao, Swahili
- Um'ratha – Ndebele
- Upswa – Mozambique
- Vbogobe – Sotho, Tswana
- Vhuswa – Venda
- Xima – Mozambique

== Gallery ==
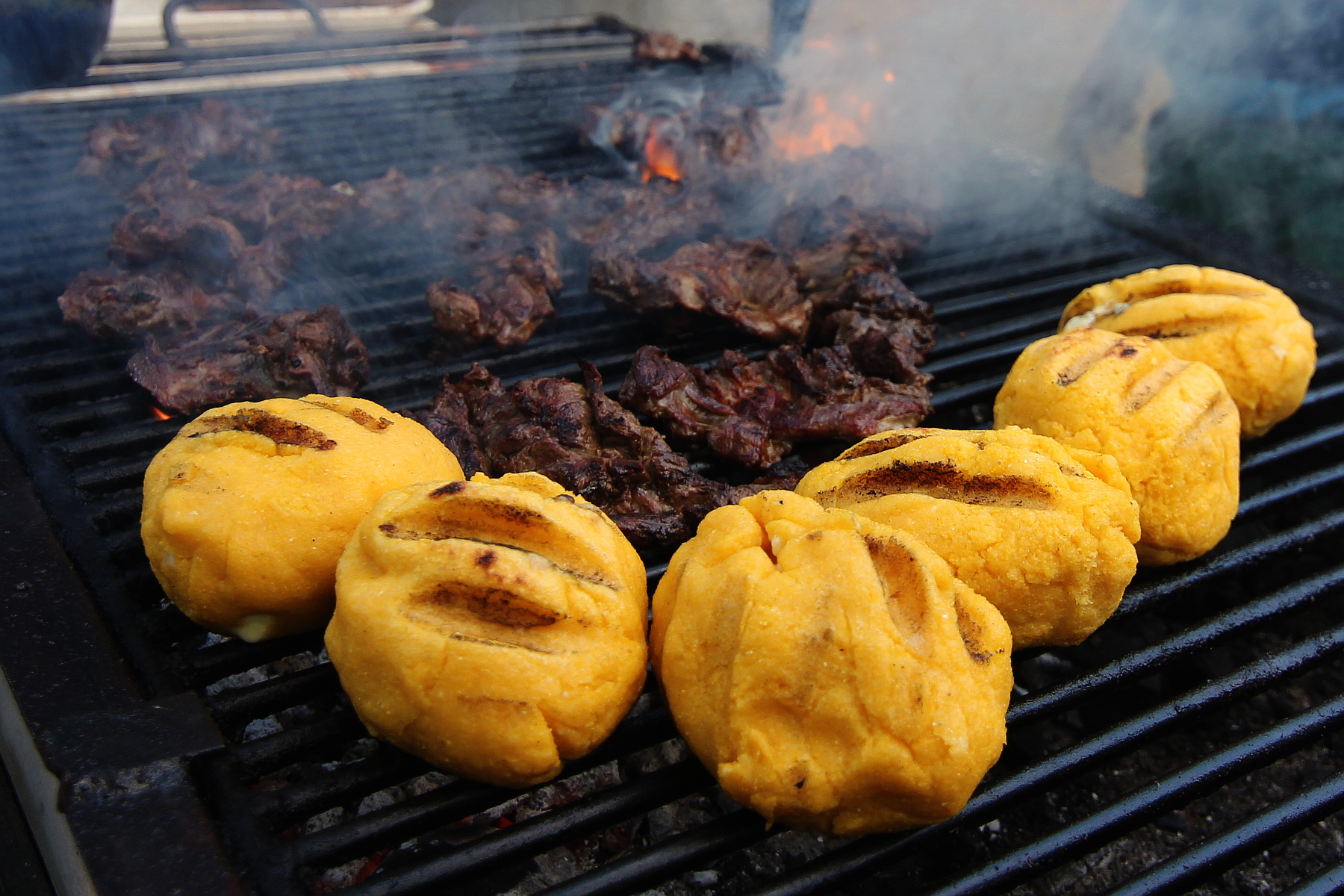
Grilled bulz and pastrami

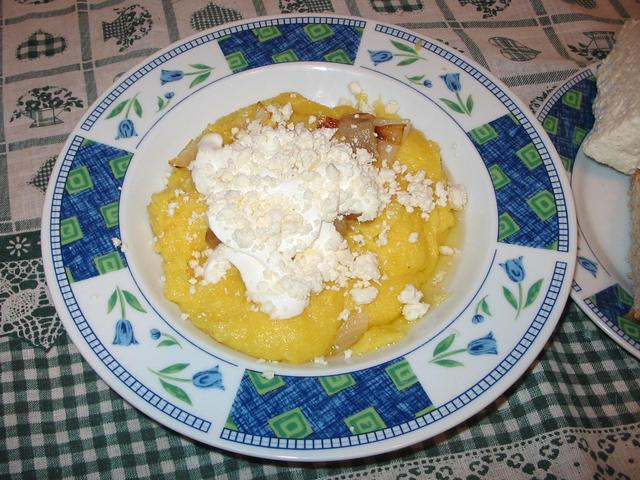
Mămăligă with pork rind, bryndza and sour cream

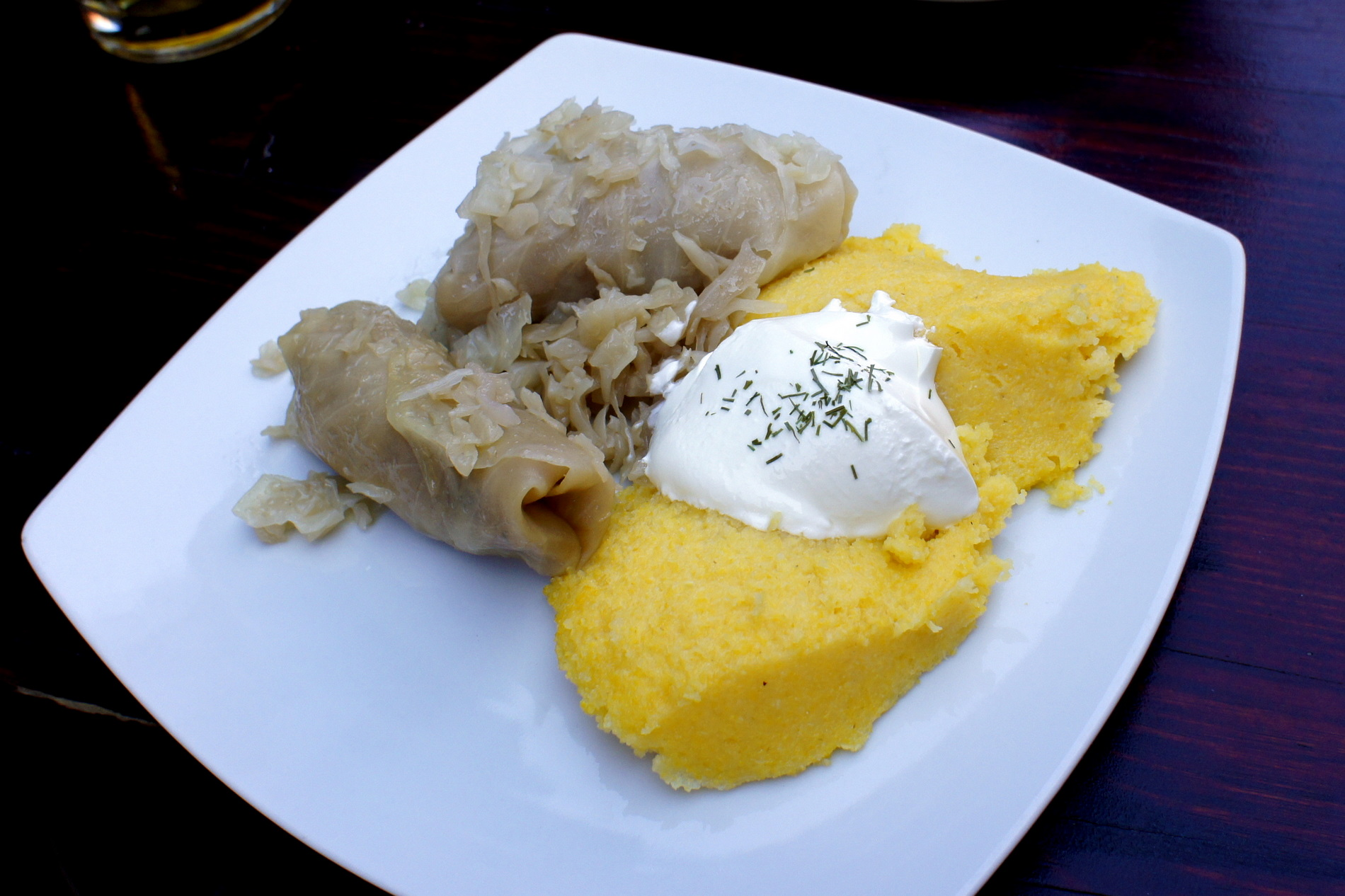
Mămăligă with a spoonful of sour cream and sarmale

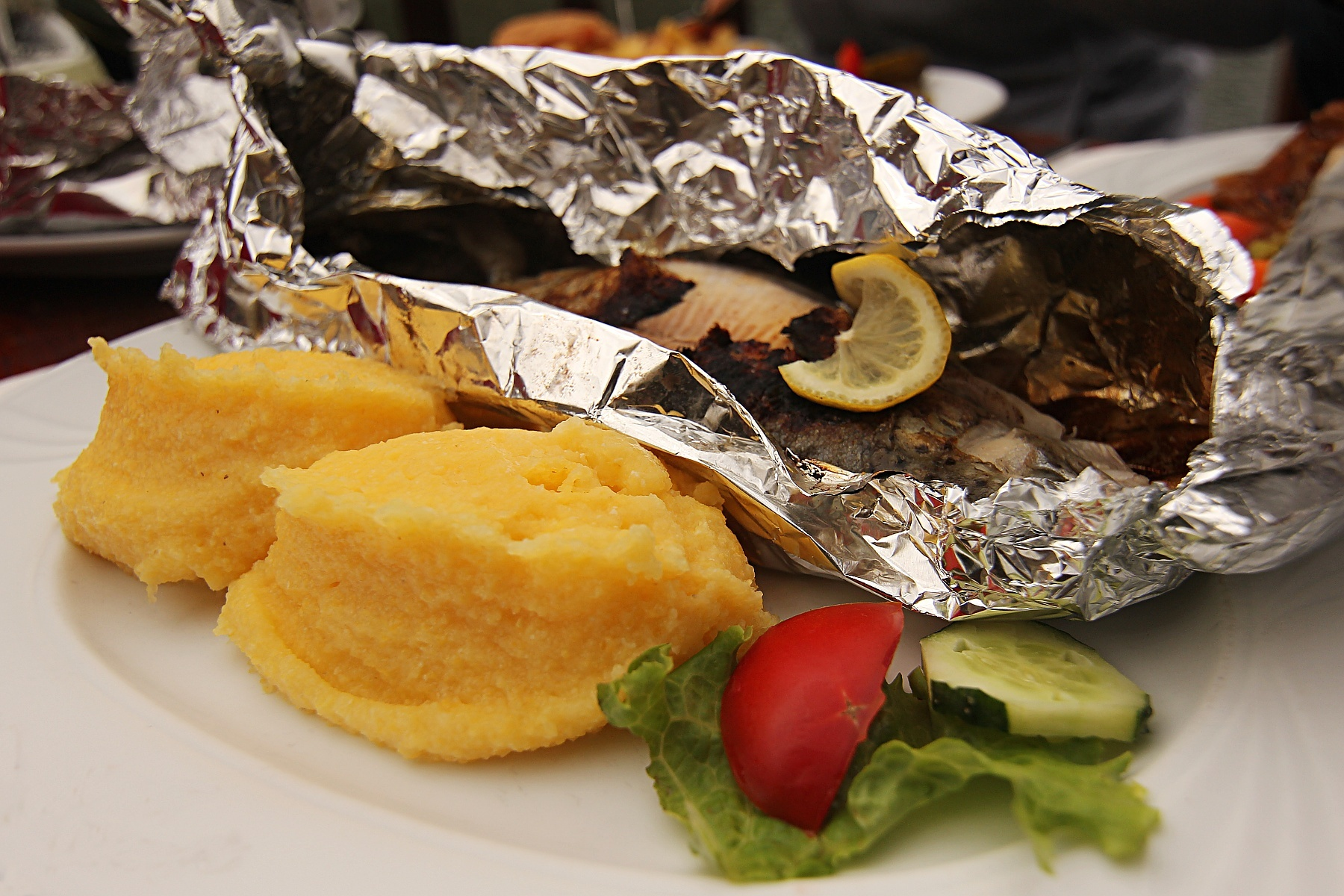
Mămăligă and trout wrapped in tinfoil

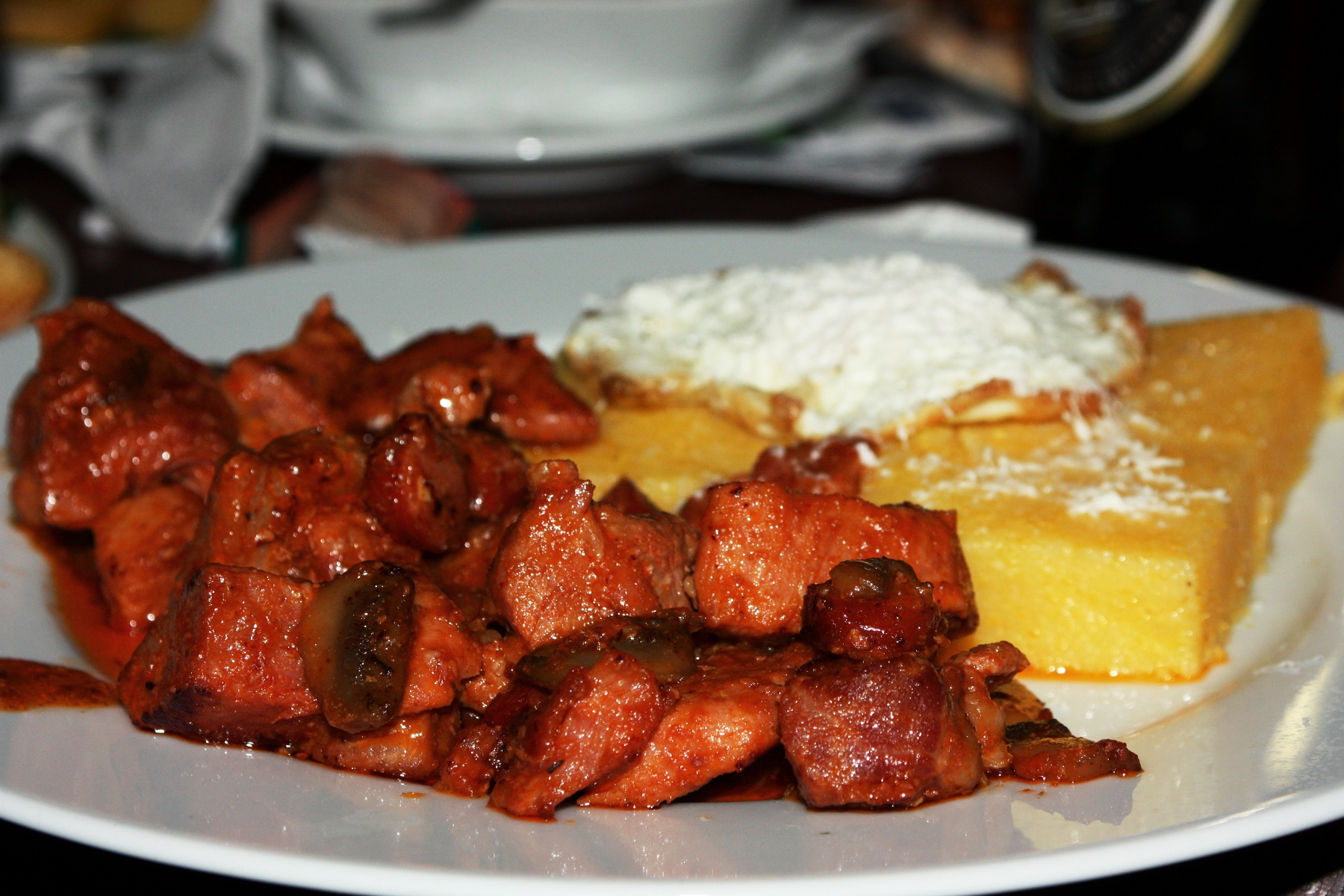
Moldavian tochitură with mămăligă, cheese and egg

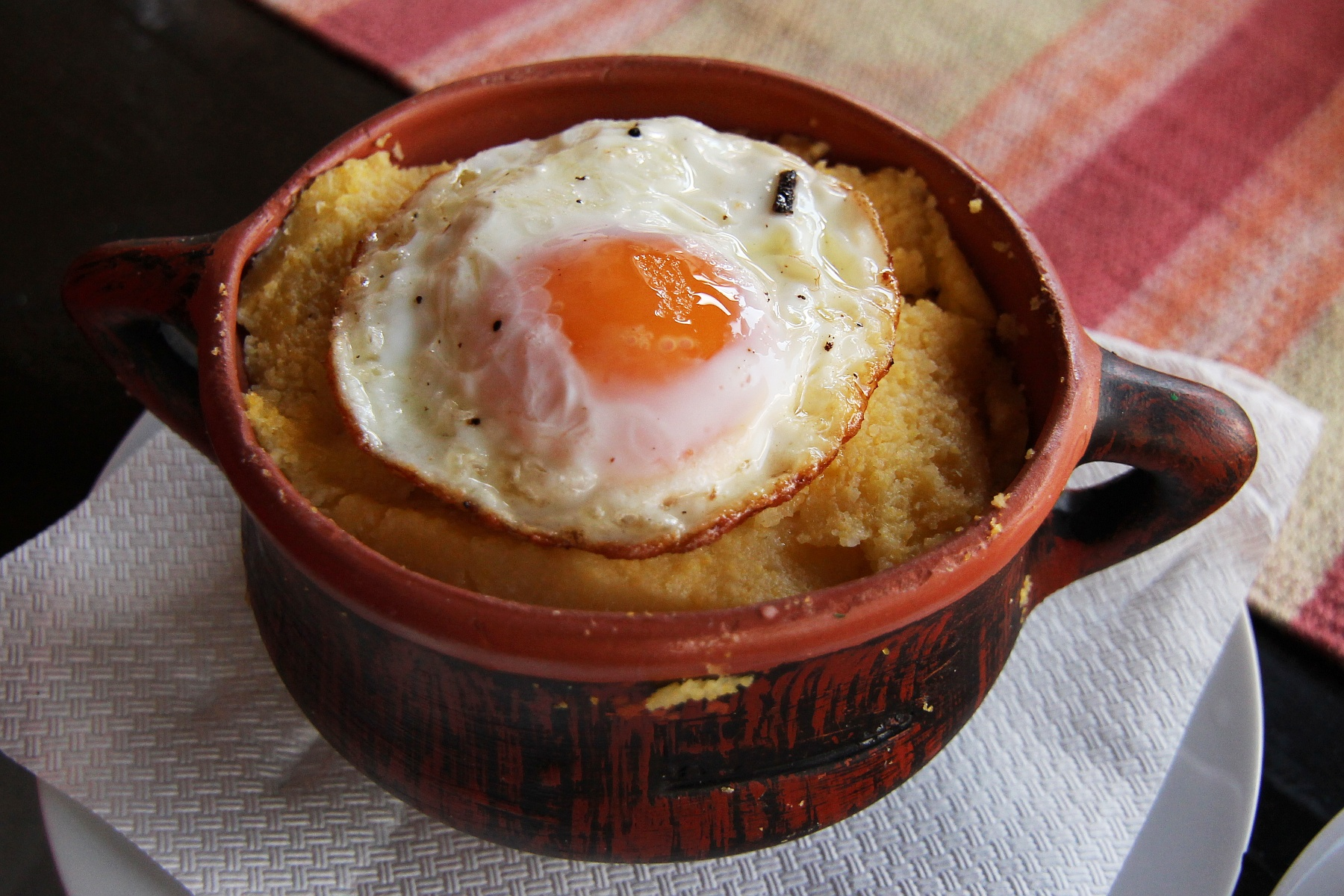
Bulz with egg

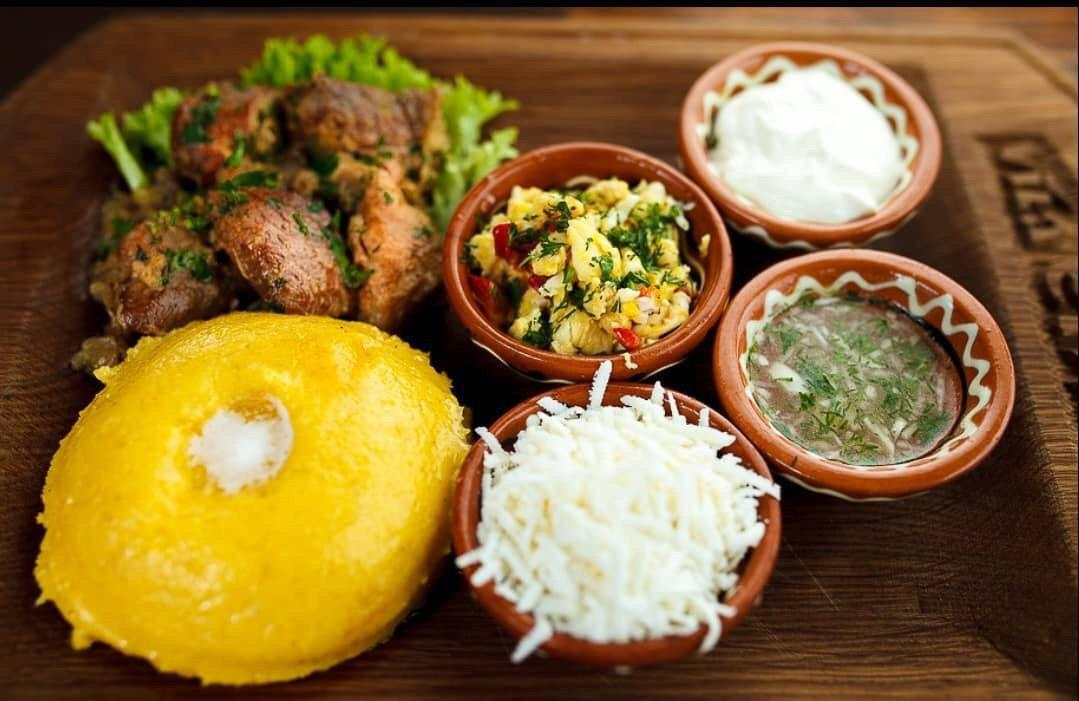
Mămăligă served with salad, cheese, and meat in Moldova

== See also ==
- Bulz
- Banosh
- Cocoloși
- Cornbread
- List of maize dishes
- List of porridges
- Tocană - a Romanian stew traditionally served with mămăligă
