= Tochitură =

Romanian stew

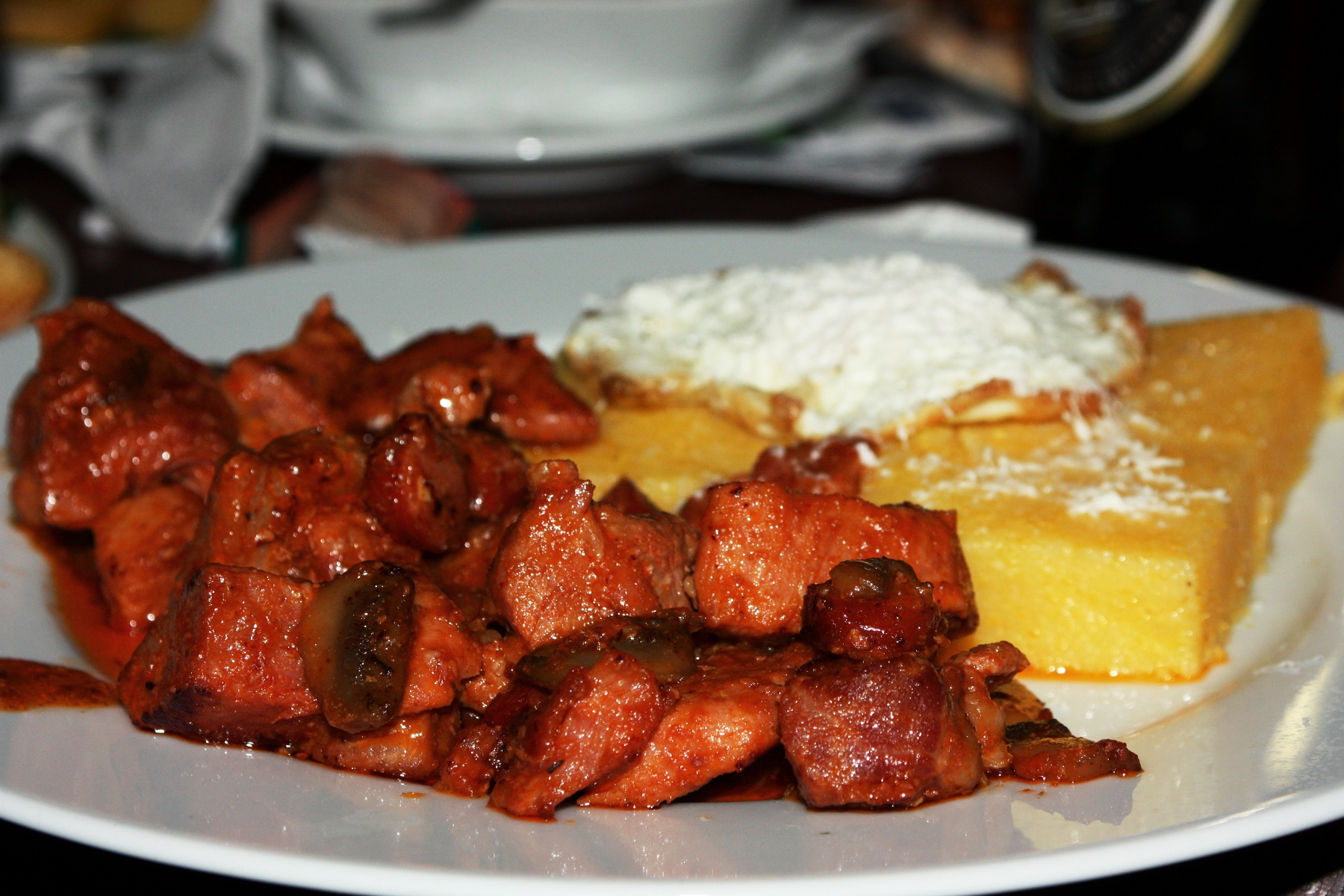
- Type: Stew
- Place of origin: Romania, Moldova
- Main ingredients: Beef, pork, tomato sauce

Tochitură (Romanian pronunciation: [toki'turə]) is a traditional Romanian and Moldovan dish made from pork cut into small cubes, (tochitură comes from the verb "a topi" which means "to melt") cooked over low fire in their own fat and juices, usually in a cast-iron pot. It is traditionally served with over-easy eggs and mămăligă. The tochitură moldovenească is the Moldavian version and the tochitură ardelenească is the Transylvanian version.

Tochitură is made in two main varieties: with or without tomato sauce and can be made from beef, lamb or chicken (depends on the area - Moldova, Transilvania, Oltenia, Muntenia, Dobrogea). In order to not be confused with a stew, the amount of tomato sauce should be minimal (and usually added at the end) so the meat will cook in its own juices. The version with tomato sauce is the most common and is prepared in most restaurants, but is less "traditional." The one without it has a sauce of pork fat and juices from the parts of the meat. The traditional Romanian dish contains not only meat, but parts of internal organs of the animal, like liver, kidneys, heart, slănină or bacon and smoked sausages fried together. It is served with mămăligă and a salty sheep cheese, either telemea or brânză de burduf.

== See also ==
- List of stews
- Tocană
